= Bona Malwal =

South Sudanese journalist and politician

- Born: 1928; Twic Mayardit County, Bahr El Ghazal, Anglo-Egyptian Sudan
- Died: 2 November 2025 (aged 97)
- Burial place: Twic County, Warrap
- Education: Indiana University Bloomington (1963); Columbia University (BA & MA, 1969)
- Occupations: Journalist; Politician
- Organizations: St Antony's College, Oxford; Columbia University
- Political party: Jieng Council of Elders; Southern Sudan Democratic Forum; Southern Front
- Movement: South Sudanese self-determination
- Opponents: John Garang; Hassan al-Turabi; Sadiq al-Mahdi
- Board member of: Sudan Daily (1961); The Vigilant (1965–1969); Al Sahafa (1974); Sudanow Magazine (1976–1978); The Sudan Times (1986–1989); Sudan Democratic Gazette (1989–2001)
- Spouse: Salwa Gabriel Berberi
- Father: Madut Ring

Minister of Culture and Information
- In office May 1973 – July 1978
- President: Gaafar Nimeiry
- Prime Minister: Rashid Bakr (1976–1977)
- Preceded by: Omar al-Haj Musa
- Succeeded by: Ali Muhammad Shamo

Regional Minister of the Southern Sudan Autonomous Region
- In office May 1980 – October 1981
- President: Gaafar Nimeiry (Sudan); Abel Alier (Southern Sudan)

Advisor to the President of Sudan
- In office September 2005 – June 2011
- President: Omar al-Bashir
- Writing career
- Language: English; Juba Arabic; Dinka

Bona Malwal Madut Ring (1928 (Note: 1938, 1937, and 1935 have also been mentioned as Malwal's year of birth.) – 2 November 2025) was a South Sudanese journalist, politician and government official known for his advocacy for self-determination and secession for southern Sudan (today's South Sudan). A member of the Dinka ethnic group, he pursued his education in journalism and economics in the United States, earning degrees from Indiana University Bloomington and Columbia University. His career transitioned from an early stint as an Information Officer to journalism, including Editor-in-Chief positions at various Sudanese newspapers including the Southern Front's mouthpiece, The Vigilant.

Malwal co-founded the Southern Front, served in the national assembly, and held ministerial positions, advocating for cultural, informational policies, and economic development before and during Gaafar Nimeiry's era. He also notably resigned in protest against the imposition of Sharia law and Arabic as Sudan's official language after the 1977 National Reconciliation, before later joining the Southern Sudan Autonomous Region's government. In the 1990s, he advocated against human right abuses in Sudan while in self-exile.

He played a role in peace negotiations and South Sudan's independence, occasionally aligning with controversial figures like Omar al-Bashir, who is wanted by the International Criminal Court for orchestrating the Darfur genocide. Malwal's advocacy for South Sudanese self-determination alongside his critical stance against both northern and southern leaders stirred controversies, including accusations of exacerbating ethnic tensions and his involvement in conflicts and divisive statements, including his views on other ethnic groups. Malwal's family remains influential in South Sudanese politics and diplomacy.

== Early life and education ==
Bona Malwal Madut Ring was born in 1928 in Twic Mayardit County, Bahr El Ghazal, Anglo-Egyptian Sudan (today in South Sudan). He is from the Dinka ethnic group and is the son of a Gogrial Dinka chief. Malwal completed a diploma in journalism from Indiana University Bloomington in 1963 on a scholarship, followed by a bachelor's degree in economics (Note: Other sources mention that Malwal did his bachelor's at St. John's University (New York City)) and a Master of Arts in journalism and communications, both from Columbia University in 1969.

== Journalistic career ==
In his early years, he became an Information Officer in Wau between 1951 and 1961, but then Malwal pursued a career in journalism, joining the government newspaper Sudan Daily's editorial board in 1961.

Malwal became the editor-in-chief of the Southern Front's mouthpiece, The Vigilant, an English-language newspaper in Sudan. The journal was founded on 23 March 1965. Publication of The Vigilant was interrupted between July 1965 and January 1966, following the publishing of articles about the massacres in Juba and Wau. The Vigilant was closed in May 1969 following Gaafar Nimeiry's 1969 coup d'état. In March 1974, he became an editorial board member of Al Sahafa newspaper. He later founded and became the editor-in-chief for Sudanow Magazine (1976–1978), The Sudan Times (1986–1989), and Sudan Democratic Gazette (1989–2001).

Malwal also worked as a senior research fellow at Columbia University (1978–1979), and senior research fellow and visiting academic at St. Antony's College, University of Oxford, as part of the Sudanese Programme. The Sudanese Programme was co-founded in 2002 by Malwal and Ahmed al-Shahi within the Middle East Centre and the African Studies Centre at St Antony's College.

Among many books, Malwal authored Sudan and South Sudan: From One to Two, published in 2015, which is regarded as his political memoir and provides insights into the history and challenges of the two nations. The book reflects his strong advocacy for self-determination and secession for South Sudan.

== Political career ==
Malwal co-founded and served as the secretary-general of the Southern Front (SF), a political organisation, in 1965. He was elected to the National Assembly in April 1968, but was later dismissed after a coup by General Nimeiry in 1969.

=== Nimeiry era ===
Following the 1972 peace agreement that ended the First Sudanese Civil War (1955–1972) in southern Sudan, Malwal served as the undersecretary of the Minister of Culture and Information starting in July 1972. He became the minister in May 1973 and served until July 1978. He was also involved in the government's foreign affairs, being appointed at the Political Bureau of the ruling and the only legal political party, the Sudanese Socialist Union. He was a member of the National Assembly between 1974 and 1978.

In March 1976, Malwal arranged for the release of Ibrahim El-Salahi, who was due to be executed. El-Salahi was Malwal's undersecretary at the Ministry of Culture and Information until his arrest in September 1975 following an anti-government coup.

In July 1976, a force of one thousand insurgents under Sadiq al-Mahdi, armed and trained by Libya, crossed the border from Ma'tan as-Sarra. After passing through Darfur and Kordofan, the insurgents engaged in three days of house-to-house fighting in Khartoum and Omdurman that killed some 3000 people. Malwal and Abel Alier continued to broadcast the news from Juba instead of Omdurman. During that time, President Gaafar Nimeiry was able to rally the nation via Radio Juba, and his government was saved after a column of army tanks entered the city to end the coup attempt. Some 3,000 were killed during the coup. 98 people were officially implicated in the plot, including Muhammad Nour Saad, and they were executed.

In 1977, a National Reconciliation took place in Port Sudan between Sadiq al Mahdi and Nimeiry, which saw the return of Hassan Al-Turabi, an Islamist leader who had been imprisoned and then exiled after the May Revolution, as the Justice Minister and Attorney General in 1978. Relations between Khartoum and the South Sudan leadership worsened after the National Reconciliation. Malwal publicly opposed the National Reconciliation. In 1978, he resigned in protest against the shift to Sharia law, and Arabic becoming the country's official language. Afterwards he left for the US.

In 1980, Malwal returned to Sudan and became the Regional Minister of Industry and Mining in Abel Alier's government for the Southern Sudan Autonomous Region. Later, in August 1981, he was moved to the Regional Ministry of Finance and Economic Planning after a disagreement with the (national) Minister of Industry and Mining, Sherif El-Tohamy, for his decision to place an oil refinery in Kosti instead of Bentiu. During his tenure, the World Bank funded a rice project in Aweil, which initially faced opposition from the local Dinka community but was eventually accepted and implemented. The project, covering a million acres, aimed to make Sudan self-sufficient in rice. But once the Sudanese Civil War (1983–2005) started, it reduced the project productivity and disrupted transportation, affecting marketability. Malwal also leveraged his contacts for a US$9 million for the southern region's development.

Malwal was later dismissed from Alier's regional government due to his vocal opposition to Nimeiry's Islamist stance. He was detained in Kobar Prison in October 1981 until 1984. After he was released, he fled to the United Kingdom and later the US. He returned after the April 1985 revolution as a journalist, establishing The Sudan Times (1986–1989) with Mahjoub Mohamed Salih, and opposing Sadiq al Mahdi's new government that came after the 1985 coup d'état. During that time, he documented how the north's policies, during the Second Sudanese Civil War, led to the 1988 famine in Bahr El Ghazal, which killed approximately 250,000 to 500,000 people. Malwal also later testified in front of the US Congress in 1987 about Slavery in Sudan.

Malwal left for the UK again following the 1989 Sudanese coup d'état led by Brigadier Omar al-Bashir and supported by Hassan al-Turabi, the leader of the National Islamic Front.

=== Al-Bashir era ===
Malwal and his family was granted leave to remain in the UK in 1989. While in self-exile in the UK up to April 2001, Malwal was a visiting academic at St. Antony's College, University of Oxford, established the Sudan Democratic Gazette (1989–2001), published Crisis in the Sudan: Re-Thinking the Future in 1994 with Peter Nyot Kok, and co-founding the Sudanese Programme in 2002. With other exiled southern Sudanese politicians, Malwal launched the South Sudan Democratic Forum (SSDF). In 1989 and 1991, Malwal shared his opinion about the "Democratic Revolution in Africa" and his personal experience in "Surviving Dictatorship" in seminars sponsored by the National Endowment for Democracy, US. In 1993, he appeared on the Charlie Rose talk show with Paul Simon, Judith Ann Mayotte, and Suzan Mazur to discuss the ongoing civil war in Sudan. In the UK, in 1998, he testified to the Parliament of the United Kingdom about the famine in Sudan in 1998, which mostly affected Bahr el Ghazal region in southwestern Sudan and killed more than 70,000.

In 2004, Malwal returned to Sudan to supported the ongoing negotiations for a peace agreement between the Sudan People's Liberation Movement and the Government of Sudan. In September 2005, after the Comprehensive Peace Agreement that ended the Second Sudanese Civil War and set up a timeline for a Southern Sudanese independence referendum, Malwal became an adviser to President Omar al-Bashir. In March 2008, Malwal called for the creation of a reconciliation body in South Sudan stating that

It is necessary for the Government of Southern Sudan, therefore, led by the SPLM/SPLA that was largely responsible for the war atrocities within Southern Sudan, to now establish a truth and reconciliation commission, to lay to rest the ghosts of war and to enable the society to reconcile and to move on

— Bona Malwa, during the 15th anniversary commemoration of the death of Joseph Oduho

In October 2008, Malwal voiced concerns about the potential arrest warrant for al-Bashir by the International Criminal Court (ICC). He dismissed the ICC's move as a politically motivated and defended al-Bashir, claiming that indicting him would target Sudan as a sovereign nation and could negatively impact existing peace agreements. He emphasised that al-Bashir, as a leader, could not be able to order the extermination of any group. On 4 March 2009, al-Bashir became the first sitting head of state to be indicted by the ICC, for directing a campaign of mass killing, rape, and pillage against civilians in Darfur.

Malwal was the co-director for the al-Bashir campaign for April 2010 Sudanese general election which al-Bashir won. Malwal accompanied al-Bashir during his South Sudan campaign visit to Juba, Yambio, Rumbek, Tonj, and Kuacjok. Malwal also stood for election for National Legislature in Warrap but later withdrew his candidacy citing "detention and harassment" by the Sudan People's Liberation Army (SPLA), which the SPLA denied. Malwal facilitated the reconciliation between 23 southern political parties and armed factions, and the SPLA.

In June 2011, after South Sudan was declared and recognised following the 2011 South Sudanese independence referendum, Malwal announced that he was retiring from politics. In his retirement statement, Malwal warned against "tribal politics", and, reflecting on his time working with al-Bashir, he praised al-Bashir saying that "I commend his [al-Bashir] wisdom, fortitude, perseverance and statesmanship and applaud him and thank him for this."

== Political views ==
Malwal was known for his strong political stances, which sparked controversies as evidenced by his disagreement with Hassan al-Turabi and Sadiq al-Mahdi for their role in imposing Islam and Arabic language on the south. Following the National Reconciliation in 1977 which brought al-Mahdi and al-Turabi back to politics, Malwal criticised the Arab countries, saying that they talk about Arab-Muslim Sudan as if the south were without people. He also stated that "the Arabs are biased towards the north, and call for the unity of Sudanese soil without regard for the southerners," noting that "the timing of the Arab contribution to development in the south raises doubts about their intentions." Regarding the situation of southerners in Sudan, he said, "During the colonial era, we were second-class citizens, but now we are fourth-class citizens."

Since the inception of the Sudan People's Liberation Movement (SPLM) was founded in 1983, Malwal has had long held sharp opinions against the group and its leader John Garang. Malwal accused the northern government and John Garang's movement of not being serious about achieving peace in South Sudan. In letters shared by the two that later became public, Malwal also urged Garang's deputy, Salva Kiir, to oppose Garang. In 2001, Malwal filled a defamation lawsuit and an injunction to restrain against Garang and Michael George Garang Deng. Leaked diplomatic cables described him as a sworn enemy of Garang. Following Garang death in 2005, in an official press release from the Chairman of Dinka Caucus of Mainstream Democratic Forum in the US, they alleged that Malwal attended Garang's funeral "to laugh at his dead body". However, Malwal later reconciled with Garang's widow in 2019.

Malwal advocated for self-determination and secession of South Sudan. Malwal faced criticism from political analysts and individuals who questioned his intentions and allegedly divisive politics. The criticisms claimed that his political rhetoric and actions were fuelling conflicts. For example, he was accused of spreading hate messages against certain ethnic groups, such as the Nuer people. In an article published in the Sudan Tribune in 2007, the Dinka members of the South Sudan Democratic Forum (SSDF) voiced their strong disapproval of Malwal, a prominent figure in the SSDF. They attributed the split within the party to Malwal's actions. The Dinka members accuse him of potentially jeopardising the party's electoral chances due to his association with a controversial government and making statements that could alienate Southerners. They further condemn Malwal for his past "racist" and "tribalistic" views towards other ethnic groups, particularly the Nuer and Equatorians.

Malwal was also a member of the Jieng Council of Elders, which is accused of widening the division between the Dinka and Nuer, and undermining the United Nations Mission in South Sudan.

Furthermore, a report suggested that Malwal and Francis Deng fuelled the Abyei conflict, between the Twic Mayardit Dinka of Warrap state and the Ngok Dinka, through their publications. In December 2017, Malwal stated in a press conference in Khartoum that Abyei, a region claimed by both Sudan and South Sudan, is part of Sudan. The statement angered South Sudanese politicians.

== Personal life and death ==
Malwal was Catholic. He was married to Salwa Gabriel Berberi, an international law expert and diplomat in the South Sudanese government. His son, Akuei, is a South Sudanese diplomat and served as the Permanent Representative of South Sudan to the United Nations from 2016 to 2023. His other son, Makol, is a trustee of the Sudanese Programme. His daughter, Sandra, is the Secretary General of the Sudan People's Liberation Movement-Democratic Change Party (Lam Akol faction). His other daughter, Natalina, is an Executive Board Member and President of the Southern Sudanese Community in Montgomery County, Maryland, US.

According to Malwal, his sister, who was a nurse, was captured into slavery.

In the memory of the British anthropologist Godfrey Lienhardt (1921–1993), who extensively studied and wrote about the Dinka in southern Sudan, Malwal translated three Dinka songs about Lienhardt into English.

Malwal died on 2 November 2025, and buried in his home town in Twic County, Warrap state.

== Books ==
- Malwal, Bona (1975). The Sudan: A Link Between Arab and Non-Arab Africa. Culture & Inf. Ministry, Translation & Publication Department.
- Malwal, Bona (1981). People & Power in Sudan: The Struggle for National Stability. Ithaca. ISBN 978-0-903729-78-9.
- Malwal, Bona (1985). The Sudan, a Second Challenge to Nationhood. Thornton Books. ISBN 978-0-936508-13-9.
- Malwal, Bona; Kok, Peter N. (1995). Crisis in the Sudan: Re-Thinking the Future. Lilian Barber Press. ISBN 978-0-936508-34-4.
- Malwal, Bona (2005). Sudan's Latest Peace Agreement: An Accord that Is Neither Fair nor Comprehensive. Abdel-Karim Mirghani cultural center.
- Malwal, B. (2015). Sudan and South Sudan: From One to Two. Palgrave Macmillan UK. ISBN 978-1-349-49376-0.
- Bol, Fabian Agamlong Guem; Malwal, Bona (2016). Memoirs of a Village-Born General. Bourchier. ISBN 978-0-9934692-0-6.
- Malwal, Bona (2017). Abyei of the Ngok Dinka: Not Yet South Sudan. Bourchier. ISBN 978-0-9934692-6-8.
- Malwal, Bona (2022). No Future Without the Past. Bourchier. ISBN 978-1-9161197-2-7.

== See also ==
- Luigi Adwok – Sudanese politician (1929–2010)
- Mansour Khalid – Sudanese lawyer, diplomat, and scholar (1931–2020)
- Philemon Majok – Sudanese politician (1905–1982)
- Santino Deng Teng – Sudanese politician (born 1922)
