= Ministry of Health (South Sudan) =

Government ministry of South Sudan

South Sudan Ministry of Health
Department overview
- Formed: 2011
- Jurisdiction: South Sudan
- Headquarters: Juba
- Minister responsible: Vacant, Minister of Health

The South Sudan Ministry of Health is a national ministry in the current Revitalised Transitional Government of National Unity (RTGoNU) in the Republic of South Sudan.

This national ministry in the current Government of South Sudan was formed immediately after the country gained her Independence in 2011. The minister between 2022 and 2025 was Yolanda Wel Deng

== List of ministers of health ==
	Minister	In office		Party
	Southern Sudan Autonomous Region (1972–2005)	1972	2005	
1	Abel Alier	1972	1985	
2	Joseph Lagu	1985	1980	
3	Lubari Ramba	1980	1985	
4	Hilary Logali	1985	1990	
5	Clement Mboro	1990	1995	
6	Isaiah Kulang	1995	2000	
7	Angelo Beda	2000	2000	
1	Peter Gatkuoth	2000	2005	
2	Michael Milly Hussein	2011	2011	
3	Ali Osman Taha	2011	2011	
4	Hon Elizabeth Achuei	2011	2012	
5	Angelina Teny	2012	2013	
6	Dr Riek Gai Kok	2013	2013	Sudan People's Liberation Movement
7	Kuol Manyang Juuk	2013	2013	
8	Gismalla Abdalla Rassas	2013	2013	
9	Gabriel Tang	2013	2013	
10	Taban Deng Gai	2013	2015	
11	Anthony Lino Makana	2016	2016	
12	Obuch Ojwok Akuo	2016	2017	
13	John Uliny	2017	2017	
14	Yoanis Okiech	2017	2018	
15	Otowang Achwang	2018	2018	
16	Paul Malong Awan	2018	2019	
17	James Hoth Mai	2019	2019	
18	James Ajongo Mawut	2019	2020	
19	Gabriel Jok Riak	2020	2020	
20	Madut Biar Yel	2020	2020	
21	Elizabeth Acuei Yor	2020	2022	
22	Yolanda Wel Deng	2022	2025	
