= List of heads of state of South Sudan =

President of the Republic of South Sudan
- Presidential Seal

- Presidential Flag

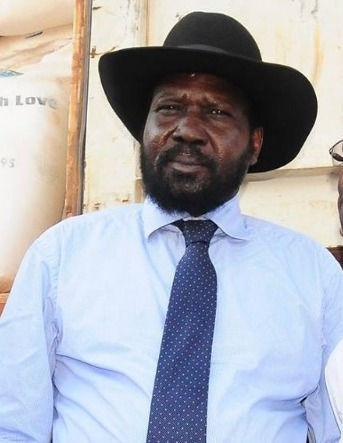
- Incumbent; Salva Kiir since 9 July 2011
- Style: His Excellency
- Type: Head of state Head of government
- Member of: Cabinet
- Residence: State House, Juba
- Seat: Juba
- Appointer: Direct popular vote
- Term length: Four years
- Constituting instrument: Transitional Constitution of South Sudan
- Precursor: President of the Government of Southern Sudan
- Formation: 9 July 2011; 15 years ago
- First holder: Salva Kiir
- Deputy: Vice President of South Sudan
- Salary: SSP 45,922,800 / US$60,000 annually
- Website: www.presidency.gov.ss

This article lists the heads of state of South Sudan since the establishment of the Southern Sudan Autonomous Region within Sudan in 1972.

The president of the Republic of South Sudan is the head of state and head of government of South Sudan. The president leads the executive branch of the Government of South Sudan and is the commander-in-chief of the South Sudan People's Defence Forces. The official residence of the president is State House, J1.

== History of the office ==
The region of Southern Sudan (currently the independent republic of South Sudan) became autonomous for the first time, within Sudan, in 1972, through the Addis Ababa Agreement meant to end the First Sudanese Civil War, and its local government had five presidents until 1983, when the Sudanese central government revoked the autonomy. Autonomy was gained again in 2005, through the Comprehensive Peace Agreement meant to end the Second Sudanese Civil War, and the position of president of Southern Sudan was restored. Then, on 9 July 2011, South Sudan became independent and a new constitution was adopted.

== Term limits ==
Salva Kiir's term as elected president ended in 2015, but constitutional amendments of 2018 and the Revitalised Transitional Government of National Unity (RTGoNU) formed in 2020 extended his mandate until 2023 and later 2024.

== Titles of heads of state ==
- 1972–1983: President of the High Executive Council
- 2005–2011: President of the Government
- 2011–present: President

== Heads of state of South Sudan (1972–present) ==
(Dates in italics indicate de facto continuation of office)

No.	Portrait	Name (Birth–Death)	Term of office			Political party	Elected
No.	Portrait	Name (Birth–Death)	Took office	Left office	Time in office	Political party	Elected
=== Southern Sudan Autonomous Region (1972–1983) ===
1	Abel Alier	Abel Alier (born 1933)	6 April 1972	February 1978	5 years, 9 months	SF	–
2	Joseph Lagu	Joseph Lagu (1931–2026)	February 1978	12 July 1979	1 year, 5 months	SANU	–
3	Peter Gatkuoth	Peter Gatkuoth (1938–2010)	12 July 1979	30 May 1980	323 days	Independent	–
(1)	Abel Alier	Abel Alier (born 1933)	30 May 1980	5 October 1981	1 year, 128 days	SF	–
4	Gismalla Abdalla Rassas	Gismalla Abdalla Rassas (1932–2013)	5 October 1981	23 June 1982	261 days	Independent	–
5	Joseph James Tombura	Joseph James Tombura (1929–1992)	23 June 1982	5 June 1983	347 days	SANU	–
Autonomy abolished (5 June 1983 – 9 July 2005)
=== Southern Sudan Autonomous Region (2005–2011) ===
1	John Garang	John Garang (1945–2005) (Note: Died in a crash of the Ugandan Mil Mi-17 presidential helicopter.)	9 July 2005	30 July 2005 †	21 days	SPLM	–
–	Salva Kiir	Salva Kiir (born 1951); Acting	30 July 2005	11 August 2005	12 days	SPLM	–
2	Salva Kiir	Salva Kiir (born 1951)	11 August 2005	9 July 2011	5 years, 332 days	SPLM	2010
=== Republic of South Sudan (2011–present) ===
1	Salva Kiir	Salva Kiir (born 1951)	9 July 2011	Incumbent	15 years, 128 days	SPLM	–

Note: The President of South Sudan was also First Vice President of the Sudanese national government until 9 July 2011.

== See also ==
- Southern Sudan Autonomous Region (1972–1983)
- Southern Sudan Autonomous Region (2005–2011)
  - Politics of South Sudan
  - History of South Sudan
  - List of governors of pre-independence Sudan
  - Vice President of South Sudan
