= National Legislature (South Sudan) =

Legislature of South Sudan

National Legislature of South Sudan

Type
- Type: Bicameral
- Houses: Council of States (upper house) National Legislative Assembly (lower house)

History
- Founded: 2011
- Preceded by: Southern Sudan Legislative Assembly

Leadership
- Speaker of the Transitional Council of States: Deng Deng Akon, SPLM-IO since 2 August 2021
- Speaker of the National Legislative Assembly: Jemma Nunu Kumba, SPLM since 2 August 2021

Structure
- Seats: 650: Council of States: 100; National Legislative Assembly: 550
- Council of States political groups: SPLM (46); SPLM-IO (27); SSOA (10); Independents (9); Vacant (8)
- National Legislative Assembly political groups: SPLM (332); SPLM-IO (128); SSOA (50); Independents (30); Former detainees (10)

Elections
- Council of States voting system: Indirect election
- National Legislative Assembly voting system: Mixed: 158 seats are elected by First-past-the-post; 110 seats reserved for women are elected by Closed list proportional representation using divisor method; 47 seats unreserved are elected by Closed list proportional representation using divisor method; 17 seats are appointed by the President
- Last National Legislative Assembly election: 11–15 April 2010 (elections to the preceding Southern Sudan Legislative Assembly)
- Next National Legislative Assembly election: 22 December 2026

Meeting place
- Ministries Complex, Juba, South Sudan

Website
- http://nla.gov.ss/

The National Legislature of South Sudan is the legislative branch of the government of South Sudan. It consists of two chambers:

- Council of States.
- National Legislative Assembly.

The National Legislature has its seat in Juba, South Sudan.

== Role ==
The legislative competencies of the National Government of South Sudan are vested in the National Legislature in respect of all matters assigned to it in Schedules A, C and D of the Transitional Constitution (read together with Schedule E of the Transitional Constitution). The National Legislative Assembly exercises the following functions:

- Overseeing the performance of the National Government institutions;
- Approving plans, programmes and policies of the National Government;
- Approving budgets;
- Ratifying international treaties, conventions and agreements;
- Adopting resolutions on matters of public concerns;
- Summoning Ministers to answer questions of members of the Assembly on matters related to their ministries;
- Interrogating Ministers about their performance or the performance of their ministries;
- Approving appointments as required by the Transitional Constitution or the law;
- Casting a vote of no confidence against the Vice President and any Minister;
- Enacting legislation to regulate the conditions and terms of service of the Judiciary and its oversight mechanisms; and
- Performing any other function as determined by the Transitional Constitution or the law.

== Eligibility ==
A candidate for membership of the National Legislature must:

- be a South Sudanese citizen;
- be at least twenty-one years of age;
- be of sound mind;
- be literate; and
- not have been convicted during the last seven years of an offence involving honesty or moral turpitude.

Members of the National Legislature and the Council of Ministers are eligible for membership of state legislatures or state councils of ministers. A member of the National Legislative Assembly cannot also be a member of the Council of States (and vice versa). The term of the National Legislature shall be four years from July 9, 2011. The Constitution is a transitional Constitution and the terms relating to future general elections are not contained in it. However, there are provisions included for by-elections should vacancies arise during the first four-year period.

== History ==
The establishment of the National Legislature is one of the new institutions created upon the independence of South Sudan in 2011. In substance, it is also a successor to the Southern Sudan Legislative Assembly, itself established in 2005 by the Constitution of Southern Sudan.

General elections are scheduled to be held in 2026.

== See also ==
- Bicameralism
- Legislative branch
- List of legislatures by country
- Politics of South Sudan
