= Philemon Majok =

Sudanese politician (1905–1982)

- فليمون ماجوك
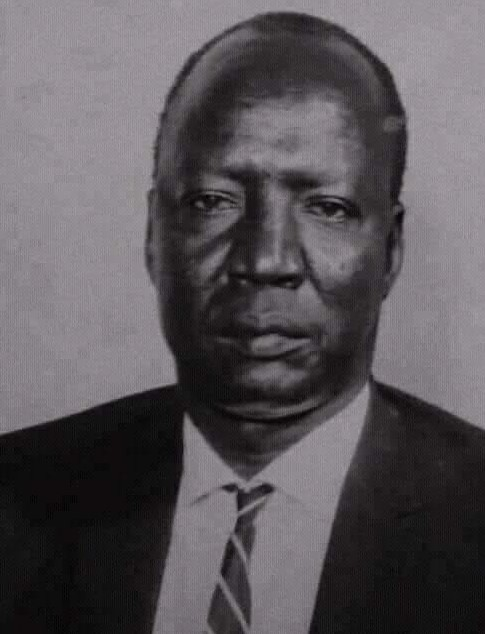

Member of the Sovereignty Council
- In office 5 July 1965 – 27 May 1968
- President: Ismail al-Azhari
- Prime Minister: Muhammad Ahmad Mahgoub (10 June 1965–25 July 1966); Sadiq al-Mahdi (27 July 1966–18 May 1967); Muhammad Ahmad Mahgou
- Preceded by: Sovereignty Council (1964–1965)
- Succeeded by: Gaafar Nimeiry

Personal details
- Born: 1905 Ador, Yirol, Anglo-Egyptian Sudan
- Died: 1982 (aged 76–77)
- Party: Democratic Unionist Party; Sudanese Nile Party; Sudan Unity Party

Philemon Majok Kuong (1905–1982) was a South Sudanese politician who advocated for Sudan unity. Majok was born in Ador, Yirol, with a Nuer father and a Dinka Ciec mother. He achieved the rank of Staff Sergeant in the British Police Force during Anglo-Egyptian rule. During World War II, he fought for the British in Ethiopia. Majok's post-war contributions included urban planning and tree planting in Lakes State.

In 1947, Majok represented the Lakes District at a conference, initially opposing a united legislative assembly for Sudan but later supporting it. Majok established a successful farm in Magreng, aiding during the 1954 famine. He served in various political roles, including Minister of Mechanical Transport and founding the Sudan Unity Party in 1964. He was a member of the Sovereignty Council and founded the Sudanese Nile Party. He was elected to the House of Representatives until the 1969 coup, he was later detained by Jaafar Nimeiry.

Majok retired from politics in 1971, managing the Yirol Oil Factory and serving as the President of Yirol Bench Court.

== Early life ==
Philemon Majok Kuong was born in 1905 in Ador, a town located approximately 24 miles northeast of Yirol. His father was Nuer from Nyuong, and his mother was Dinka Ciec from Ador. His father had sought refuge in Yirol to escape British persecution.

As a young boy, Majok completed his education at Malek Elementary School (1912–1916) in Bor and later attended Loka Intermediate School.

== Police and army career ==
In 1933, he joined the British Police Force and rose to the rank of Staff Sergeant, the highest rank attainable by a Sudanese nationals under the colonial rule.

During World War II, he fought on behalf of the British against the Italians in Ethiopia. After the war, he was assigned to administrative duties in the Lakes State, where he organised urban planning and tree planting in Rumbek and Yirol.

== Political career ==
In June 1947, he was chosen as the sole delegate from the Lakes District by the Governor of Baher el-Gazal to participate in a conference. Initially opposing the idea of a united legislative assembly for the entire Sudan, he later joined other Southern delegates in supporting the concept on the second day of the conference.

In 1948, Majok resigned from government service and established his home and farm in Magreng. He introduced large-scale mechanical farming to the area, and his farm achieved remarkable success, yielding over £1000 Sterling Pounds during the 1951–1952 season. His farm also served as a food source during the 1954 famine, helping many Dinka and Nuer families.

Majok was elected to represent Yirol in the Legislative Assembly in Khartoum in 1948. He played a role in the formation of the Southern Party (later known as the Liberal Party) in 1953 and was elected to the House of Representatives in Khartoum in the same year. He later joined the National Unity Party (NUP) and was appointed as the Minister of Mechanical Transport in 1956.

In 1957, he established the Yirol Agricultural Scheme for cultivating sesame and oversaw the construction of the Yirol Oil Factory. As Minister of Mechanical Transport, he advocated for the construction of the Shambe-Wau road. Majok also served as a member of the Central Council (1963–1964) and was appointed as the deputy chairman for the Commission for Southern Affairs in August 1964. He proposed a commission to address the issues of Southern Sudan, although it was not taken seriously by the government.

Following the collapse of the Ibrahim Abboud regime in 1964, Santino Deng and Majok founded the Sudan Unity Party and led it to the Juba Round Table Conference in March 1965, aligning the party's position with that of the Southern Front Party to promote Sudan unity, and a peaceful resolution to the Southern Sudan question.

=== Sovereignty Council ===
Majok was a member of the Sudanese Sovereignty Council from 5 Jul 1965 until 27 May 1968. The council came after the general parliamentary elections in 1965, the third in the history of Sudan, as it replaced another Sovereignty Council, which was managing the country's affairs for a transitional period after the overthrow of the rule of Lieutenant General Ibrahim Abboud. This Sovereignty Council consisted of five members, and its members were amended twice. The Chairman of the Sovereignty Council was Ismail al-Azhari. During Abdallah tenure, he joined the first line-up which came to power from 10 June 1965, and it was composed of Ismail al-Azhari (Council Chair), Majok, Khader Hamad (Democratic Unionist Party), Abdul Rahman Abdoun, and Abdallah al-Fadil al-Mahdi, who after his death was succeeded by Daoud Al-Khalifa Abdullah. Majok joined to replace Luigi Adwok Bong Gicomeho (Southern Front) who resigned on 14 June 1965. Majok was later resigned to stand for general elections, and was succeeded by Jervase Vak.

Sudan People's Liberation Army (SPLA) General Elijah Malok Aleng asserted that individuals from the Southern region who were selected for the Sovereignty Council ended up aligning with Northern political perspectives, and secured their positions despite not having substantial backing from the South Sudanese population. In addition, Majok expressed that Southerners behaved in a manner resembling children in their interactions with the more mature Northern Sudanese. He compared this situation to children needing to consume milk before they could transition to eating bread (kisra). Similarly, he believed that Southerners should be given a chance to learn the principles of self-governance before actively participating in governance.

=== Sudanese Nile Party ===
Majok founded the Sudanese Nile Party in 1967 and was based in Bahr al-Ghazal. It contested five seats in the 1968 Constituent Assembly election, and won one. In total the party obtained 2,704 votes (0.15% of the national vote).

He was elected to the House of Representatives in 1968–1969 until it was dissolved due to the 1969 coup d'état.

=== Nimeiry era ===
After the 1969 coup, he was detained in Kobar Prison by Jaafar Nimeiry for ten months and released in December 1970. In 1971, he retired from politics and was banished to Rumbek by the regime. President Jaafar Nimeiry appointed him Manager of Yirol Oil Factory (1972–1977) and later as the President of Yirol Bench Court.

== Personal life and death ==
Majok was married to twenty-seven wives. He is the father of Late Bridger General Joseph Garweech Philemon, SPLA Commander Makuei Philemon, Ambassador Majak Philemon, Chief Machiek Majok, among many.

Majok died in 1982.
