= Sudan Unity Party =

The Sudan Unity Party (abbreviated SUP, Arabic: حزب الوحدة السودانى) was a political party in Sudan. The party was formed in the aftermath of the October 1964 Revolution. Santino Deng Teng became the founding president of SUP. Santino Deng, who was based in Khartoum, had been the Minister of Animal Resources during the military government of General Ibrahim Abboud. Per Willis (2015) "Santino Deng, the most egregious of turncoat politicians, had formed a Sudan Unity Party with financial support and political protection from [the National Unionist Party (NUP)]". Another key leader of the party was Philemon Majok, who was appointed to the Sovereignty Council.

The founding manifesto of SUP, issued from Khartoum in January 1965, criticized the Southern Front and the Sudan African National Union, and argued that the government "good will policy" towards the South implied a dangerous relaxation of security measures. SUP advocated a unitary system of government for Sudan, within which local governance in the South would be based on tribal divisions. Being seen as pro-Northern outfit, SUP was opposed by other Southern politicians. Per Dunstan M. Wai (1981) the party "shared basically the same philosophy as the right-wing groups in the North except possibly on the issue of religion." SUP was represented at the March 1965 Round Table Conference by Santino Deng and Philemon Majok.

SUP won two seats in the 1967 Sudanese parliamentary by-election. The party had fielded 20 candidates in the 1967 by-election. SUP contested the April-May 1968 parliamentary election, but failed to win any seats. By the time of the 1968 election campaign Philemon Majok had left SUP and resigned from the Sovereignty Council.
