= 1967 Sudanese parliamentary by-election =

By-elections to the Constituent Assembly of Sudan where held in March-April 1967 in the three southern provinces - Bahr el Ghazal, Equatoria and Upper Nile - to fill 36 vacant seats.

These were the first elections held in Southern Sudan since ten years. Insecurity and boycotts by major political parties had led to the cancellation of elections in southern constituencies in the 1965 general election. After 1965 the ability of the elected to fully function was hampered without Southern representation. Prime Minister Sadiq al-Mahdi insisted on moving forward with by-elections in early 1967 in the southern provinces, as means to gain legitimacy for the Constituent Assembly process. Sadiq reportedly hoped to strengthen parliamentary strength of his Umma Party and amend North-South linkages. In the run-up to the election Sadiq built alliances with Southern tribal leaders.

Judge Mohammed Yousif Muidawi served as the chairman of the Election Commission during the polls. 388,185 voters were registered. The voters registration process was criticized for heavily relying on indirect registrations, with the voters roll being construed from old tax records, lists submitted by local chiefs and lists of government employees. In some locations authorities used local dance events to register voters.

On January 4, 1967 it was announced that the Sovereignty Council, in agreement with the Prime Minister, had decided to cancel the elections in Constituency 4 (Maridi North Jur and Amadi), Constituency 10 (Yei Kaya Area) and Constituency 11 (Yei Kajo Kaji). These were the areas on the Ugandan border, were Anyanya rebels manage to disrupt the preparations for the elections. The official rationale given for the cancellation was that only 607 voters had been registered in these three constituencies.

The Southern Front boycotted the election, arguing that a solution to the southern issue before holding polls. Per Southern Front president Clement Mboro the elections were not free, arguing that their real purpose was 'to water down the case of the South'. In contrast to the Southern Front, William Deng's faction of Sudan African National Union (SANU) opted to contest the polls.

The People's Democratic Party (PDP) decided to boycott the election. The PDP sent a delegation to the South ahead of the elections. Upon their return to Khartoum, the party held a press conference chaired by PDP president Abd al-Rahman, at which he alleged there elections were not free, that cities and towns were still under tight military rule, that the security situation remained precarious and that there were irregularities in voters registration. The report presented by PDP listed recent clashes between rebels and security forces, including incidents near Juba and Wau.

On February 19, 1967 a list of constituencies and candidates were published in Khartoum. Two candidates were declared elected unopposed - Buth Diu (Liberal Party) in Zeraf and Bashir Abu Sinaina (Umma Party) in the Western Nuer constituency. Election were held in 21 constituencies in Bahr el Ghazal, 9 in Upper Nile and 4 in Equatoria. There were 36 Umma Party candidates (more than one Umma Party candidate in some constituencies) in the fray, 20 Sudan Unity Party candidates, 19 SANU candidates, 10 National Unionist Party (NUP) candidates, 6 Peace Party candidates, 4 Liberal Party candidates, 2 Southern Democratic Party (SDP) candidates, 1 Democratic Peace Party candidate, 1 Southern Front candidate and 13 independent candidates.

Voting began on March 8, 1967, and would last for three weeks - in order to allow election officials to reach remote areas. Voters would cast their votes by dropping orange ballots in iron boxes, bearing images of the different parties - a lion, smiling cow, a right leg, etc.. Animal symbols were used seeking to allow illiterate voters to distinguish between the parties, albeit there was still widespread confusion over the identities of the candidacies.

Votes were to be counted between April 10-12, 1967. On April 12, 1967 it was announced that the Umma Party had won 15 of the seats, the SANU 10 seats (all from Bahr el Ghazal), the National Unity Party 5 seats, the Sudan Unity Party 2 seats, the Liberal Party 1 seat and independents 3 seats (one of whom was Luigi Adwok). The by-election boosted the Umma Party parliamentary faction, strengthening Sadiq visa-vi his NUP coalition partner.
