= Abdallah al-Fadil al-Mahdi =

Sudanese politician (1892–1966)

- عبد الله الفاضل المهدي
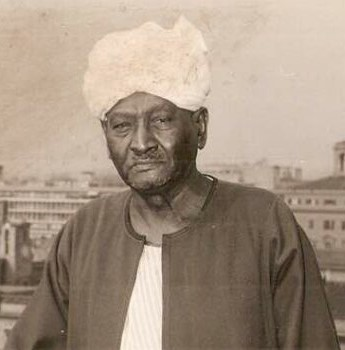

Member of the Sovereignty Council
- In office 10 June 1965 – 18 May 1966
- President: Ismail al-Azhari (Chairman of the Sovereignty Council)
- Prime Minister: Muhammad Ahmad Mahgoub
- Preceded by: Sovereignty Council (1964–1965)
- Succeeded by: Gaafar Nimeiry

Personal details
- Born: 1892 Omdurman, Mahdist State
- Died: 18 May 1966 (aged 73–74)
- Party: National Umma Party
- Spouses: Umm Al-Kiram Sharif (m. 1914) Munira Al-Qabbani (m. 1936)
- Children: 14, including Mubarak al Fadil al Mahdi
- Education: Gordon Memorial College (no degree)

Abdallah al-Fadil al-Mahdi (Arabic: عبد الله الفاضل المهدي; 1892 – 18 May 1966) was a Sudanese statesman. Born in Omdurman, in the Mahdist State; Abdallah (Note: Abdallah al-Fadil al-Mahdi is from a culture that does not use last name.) hails from a lineage tied to the Funj sultanas. Following his father death, he was raised under the care of his maternal uncle. Educated in local schools and Gordon Memorial College, he was redirected to agriculture due to academic performance, completing his education in Tokar. Abdallah embraced agriculture, working with international advisors to modernise Sudanese farming through imported equipment.

Politically, he played an important role in Sudanese independence, negotiating the 1952 "Gentlemen's Agreement" with Egypt, which paved the way for self-government and fair elections while advancing Sudanisation of public institutions. After independence, Abdallah became a senior assistant to Imam Abd al-Rahman al-Mahdi and joined the executive committee of the National Umma Party. Resisting Ibrahim Abboud's regime, he helped resolve the Ansar-government conflict. In 1965, Abdallah joined Sudan's Sovereignty Council, overseeing national governance during the transitional period. He also established a mosque in the Republican Palace.

Abdallah married twice, fathering 14 children, several of whom became prominent officials.

== Early life and education ==
Abdallah al-Fadil al-Mahdi was born in 1892 in Omdurman, Mahdist State. His mother was Zainab Muhammad Ibrahim Fung, a descendant of the Funj sultanas. Her grandfather, Ibrahim Fung, was one of the Funj princes who lived in Al-Qatina. Her mother was Fatima bint Abdul Rahman, the granddaughter of Mek Ajeeb al-Manglik. Abdallah's mother immigrated with Caliph Abdallahi ibn Muhammad, after the Battle of Shakaba, which resulted in her husband, Al-Fadil, and Caliph Muhammad Sharif's death. She migrated to the Al-Duwaym with her three children, and then her son Muhammad and her daughter died due to an illness that afflicted them. She and her remaining son, Abdallah, then settled in Al-Qatina, where she eventually remarried.

Abdallah completed the khalwa and primary school under the care of his maternal uncle, Sirr Al-Khatim, after which Imam Abd al-Rahman al-Mahdi (his uncle) came and took him to Omdurman. As part of the Anglo-Egyptian government's efforts to encourage enrolment of Mahdist boys in schools in Omdurman and Wad Medani, as well as the Gordon Memorial College, they typically received admission free of charge and were provided with school uniforms. However, in 1914, while Abdallah was still in the third grade at the primary school within the Gordon College, the Director of Education recommended his transfer. His recommendation stated, "I think it is in the boy's interest that he should turn his attention to agriculture and cultivation of his lands in the Gezira Aba. His character is very good, but he is not clever. I propose, therefore, to send him to Tokar to undergo a course of agricultural instruction." Abdallah completed his secondary education in Tokar.

Abdallah grew interested in agriculture and had Egyptian and foreign advisors, primarily from Italy, to develop agriculture in Sudan. He worked to develop agricultural work by importing agricultural equipment from abroad.

== Political career ==
=== Sudanese independence ===
On 19 October 1952, an agreement was reached between the Egyptian government and Abdallah al-Fadil al-Mahdi of the Sudanese Independence Front. This agreement authorised the process for Sudan to achieve self-government by the end of 1952, followed by the exercise of the right to self-determination within the subsequent three years. The agreement came to be known as the "Gentlemen's Agreement", which was later formalised in the Sudan Self-Government Statute between Britain and Egypt. His good relationship with Egypt played an important role in Sudan's attainment of its full rights, especially since there was mutual trust between him and Major General Muhammad Naguib.

The agreement called for establishing a committee consisting of a representative from Egypt, one from Britain, two Sudanese members, and a fifth member from a neutral nation, possibly India or Pakistan. This committee's primary purpose was to provide guidance and advice to the Governor-General in discharging his duties. It also expanded the reach of direct elections by including 35 additional constituencies, fostering a more representative political process. In addition, the agreement envisioned the establishment of an international commission tasked with overseeing the electoral processes within Sudan, ensuring fairness and impartiality. Lastly, it laid the groundwork for a "Sudanization Committee" to expedite the replacement of foreign personnel with Sudanese individuals across various sectors, including administration, the police force, and other public appointments. The agreement also included provisions related to the management and allocation of Nile water between Sudan and Egypt.

=== After independence ===
Abdallah was one of Imam Abd al-Rahman al-Mahdi's senior assistants, and a member of the National Umma Party (NUP) executive committee. He worked to foster cooperation and dialogue among political factions, Sufi orders, and religious scholars. Following the death of Abd al-Rahman al-Mahdi, Abdallah refused to assume the Imamate of the Ansar despite his entitlement to it and passed it to Siddiq al-Mahdi. In 1962, he founded the first Sudanese company to help with Hajj.

Abdallah and the National Umma Party opposed Ibrahim Abboud's military rule due to its authoritarian nature and restrictions on civil liberties. This tension led to the Mawlid massacre on 21 August 1961, where the army killed the Ansar. He later helped in stopping the bloodshed between the Ansar and the government, which led to the release of Imam Siddiq al-Mahdi.

==== Sovereignty Council ====
Abdallah was a member of the Sudanese Sovereignty Council from 10 June 1965. The council came after the general parliamentary elections in 1965, the third in the history of Sudan, as it replaced another Sovereignty Council, which was managing the country's affairs for a transitional period after the overthrow of the rule of Lieutenant General Ibrahim Abboud. This Sovereignty Council consisted of five members, and its membership was amended twice. The Chairman of the Sovereignty Council was Ismail al-Azhari. During Abdallah tenure, he joined the first line-up which came to power from 10 June 1965, and it was composed of Ismail al-Azhari (Democratic Unionist Party), and Khader Hamad (DUP), Abdel Halim Mohamed (NUP), and Luigi Adwok Bong Gicomeho (Southern Front) who resigned on 14 June 1965 and was replaced by Philemon Majok.

Following his death on 18 May 1966, Abdallah was succeeded by Daoud Al-Khalifa Abdullah. Abdallah is credited with establishing a mosque in the Republican Palace during his membership in the Sovereignty Council.

== Personal life and death ==
Abdallah married Umm Al-Kiram Sharif in 1914, and together they had 8 children, including Kamal, who was the Justice and Public Works minister in 1968. In 1936, he married Munira Al-Qabbani, and together they had 6 children including Mubarak, who was the Minister of Industry in 1987. Abdallah was keen on educating his children in schools and universities inside and outside Sudan.

Abdallah died on 18 May 1966. A commemorative stamp was issued in his memory in 1968.
