= Shilluk disarmament campaign =

Date	May 2010 – July 2010
Location	The West bank of the Upper Nile State

Belligerents
(South Sudan) Southern Sudan: (South Sudan) SPLA	Shilluk militias

Commanders and leaders
Makuol Ajang	Robert Gwan

Casualties and losses
- +10,000 displaced

The Shilluk disarmament campaign was perpetrated by the Sudanese People's Liberation Army (SPLA) troops in the summer of 2010 in Upper Nile, South Sudan. The civilian disarmament process was aimed towards Shilluk communities and the disarmament was committed by Nuer and Dinka troops of the SPLA. The disarmament process lead to widespread allegations of human rights abuses and served as the motivation of multiple Shilluk rebellions stemming from the region.

== Background ==
The Comprehensive Peace Agreement (CPA) signed in 2005, brought the end to the Second Sudanese Civil War. The CPA also called for the disarmament, demobilization and reintegration of armed groups. The SPLA started the disarmament process in Jonglei State in order to reduce ethnic violence and to ensure the security of its territory. The disarmament of Lou Nuer in 2005, lasted around two months, and led to the deaths of around 400 SPLA soldiers and 1,200 Nuer White Army casualties. In the West bank of Upper Nile State, which is considered the homeland of the Shilluk, clashes erupted between the Shilluk and the Padang clan of the Dinka tribe. The clashes stemmed from a dispute between the two groups over whom should lead a parade in Malakal.

During the 2010 Southern Sudanese general elections Ethnically Shilluk Lam Akol and his opposition party SPLM-DC had a major political victory by gaining four seats in the South Sudan Legislative Assembly, which was more than any other opposition party in the country. After the elections violence in Upper Nile increased with armed elements attacking barges near Fashoda. These attacks lead to the SPLA blaming Akols party the SPLA-DC of inciting violence.

== The disarmament ==
Due to the ongoing clashes and the victory of the SPLM-DC, the SPLA decided to start a disarmament campaign in Upper Nile especially targeting Shilluk communities. In May 2010, the SPLA deployed the 7th Infantry Division in Fashoda. The disarmament was reportedly led by Dinka troops which were considered as not trustworthy by the Shilluk due to their long time rivalry over the land of Upper Nile. During the disarmament the Dinka and Nuer SPLA troops were accused of large-scale abuses against the civilians, such as rape, torture and destroying the homes of the Shilluk. The disarmament process lasted around three months ending in July. At the end of the campaign over 10,000 Shilluk were displaced and around 21,444 residents of Fashoda County were in need of relief assistance. The clashes between the SPLA and the troops of Robert Gwang, a local Shilluk rebel, had killed 30 people in only July.

== Aftermath ==
After the disarmament campaign an amnesty agreement was signed in August 2010. The agreement stipulated the integration of multiple opposition movements in to the national army. However fighting broke out between the ethnically Shilluk Agwelek forces led by Johnson Olonyi awaiting integration and the SPLA forces. The fighting between Olonyi and SPLA continued until June 2013 when Olonyi signed an amnesty deal with the government.
