= Southern Sudan autonomous region =

Southern Sudan autonomous region may refer to:

- Southern Sudan autonomous region (1972–1983), during the period of autonomy at the end of the First Sudanese Civil War
- Southern Sudan autonomous region (2005–2011), established at the end of the Second Sudanese Civil War
