= Democratic Change =

Democratic Change may refer to:

- Democratic Change (El Salvador)
- Democratic Change (Panama)
- Democratic Change (South Sudan)
- Alliance for Democratic Change
- Movement for Democratic Change (pre-2005), a Zimbabwean political party that split in 2005
  - Movement for Democratic Change – Tsvangirai, the larger current formation of the party
  - Movement for Democratic Change – Mutambara, the smaller current formation of the party
