= Joseph Bol Chan =

South Sudanese politician

Speaker of the Council of States
- In office 5 August 2011 – May 2021
- Preceded by: Position established
- Succeeded by: Deng Deng Akon

Personal details
- Born: 1949 Lol village, Fashoda country, Upper Nile state
- Died: October 2021 (aged 71–72) Khartoum
- Party: SPLM

Joseph Bol Chan was a politician from South Sudan and Member of Council of States of South Sudan who served as Speaker of Council of States of South Sudan.

== Personal life ==
Bol was born in 1949 in Lol village in Fashoda country, Upper Nile state. He had a university degree from Hungary. He worked as a journalist.

Bol held several government positions in Sudan, including deputy governor of the Upper Nile state.

Bol became a member of the Southern Sudan Legislative Assembly following the Comprehensive Peace Agreement of 2005. In August 2011 he was elected as the Speaker of the Council of States and served until May 2021 when the Council of States was reformed due to the civil war peace plan.

Bol died in the end of October 2021. He was 72 years old and died of a heart attack in Khartoum.
