= Battle of Khartoum =

Battle of Khartoum may refer to:

- Siege of Khartoum (1884 – 1885)
- 1976 Sudanese coup attempt
- 2008 Omdurman attack
- Battle of Khartoum (2023–2025)
