= 1976 Sudanese coup attempt =

Attempted military coup d'état in Sudan

- Part of the Coups d'état in Sudan
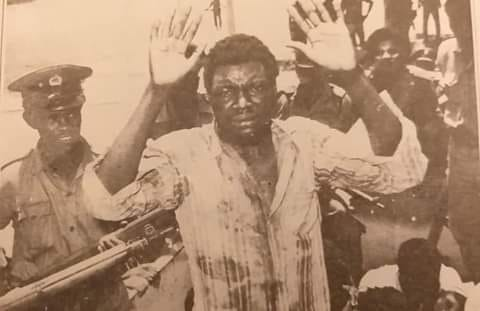
- Corporal al-Freni, one of the conspirators, captured after the week-long fight
Date	2–5 July 1976
Location	Khartoum, Sudan 15°36′N 32°30′E
Result	Coup attempt fails: Nimeiry government restored; Execution of rebelling officers; 1977 National Reconciliation

Belligerents
Democratic Republic of the Sudan; National Revolutionary Command Council; Loyalist military units	National Front; Umma Party; (Sudan) Democratic Unionist Party; Rebel military units; Libya

Commanders and leaders
(Sudan) Gaafar Nimeiry (Sudan) Abel Alier; Mohamed al-Baghir Ahmed	Sadiq al-Mahdi (Sudan) Muhammad Nour Saad (executed) (Libya) Muammar Gaddafi

Strength
	2,000
- Location within Sudan

In early 1972, Gaafar Nimeiry visited Saudi Arabia and engaged in dialogue with Sharif Hussein al-Hindi, the opposition leader, at the request of King Faisal of Saudi Arabia. The dialogue revolved around addressing past grievances and the political landscape. Nimeiry attributed past massacres to communists while Sharif criticised Nimeiry's regime. Offers and suggestions were exchanged, including Nimeiry proposing the Vice Presidency to Sharif, but no agreement was reached. Disappointed with the outcome, Sharif planned an attack on Khartoum with Libyan support.

Sadiq al-Mahdi joined the opposition and orchestrated a coup attempt in 1976, storming Khartoum with dissident forces led by Muhammad Nour Saad on 2 July. Their attempt to arrest Nimeiry was met with resistance, and the ensuing battle caused significant civilian casualties. Despite taking control initially, the rebel forces faced supply shortages and eventually succumbed to loyalist troops, ending the coup after a week. The aftermath involved searches, arrests, and executions of suspected plotters.

The coup's failure led to a National Reconciliation in 1977, a brief period of pluralism and cooperation between opposition leaders and Nimeiry's government. However, tensions persisted, particularly with the South Sudan leadership, due to shifts in policy and language. The National Reconciliation eventually faltered due to disagreements, marking the end of the attempted reconciliation.

== Background ==
In early 1972, Gaafar Nimeiry visited Saudi Arabia. During that visit, King Faisal arranged a meeting between Nimeiry and Sharif Hussein al-Hindi (leader of the opposition) at the Al-Hamra Palace in Jeddah. The King expressed to the two parties his desire for them to end their hostilities towards each other. The dialogue began, and Sharif talked about the Aba Island massacre on 27 March 1970 and Wad Nubawi massacre on 29 March 1970 against the Ansar. Nimeiry claimed that the massacres were the work of the communists. Al-Sharif criticized Nimeiry's government, regarding confiscations, nationalisation and democracy. Sharif asked Nimeiry to correct the mistakes, after which he could join him.

Numeiri asked Al-Sharif to accept an appointment as Vice President of Sudan, after which a democratic system would be implemented. Sharif was uninterested in the position and made it clear to him that he was not seeking personal gain. Sharif told Nimeiry to say what he told him in a public declaration. Nimeiry agreed, and the six-hour meeting adjourned.

Sharif contacted his supporters at home and a committee led by Muhammad Hamza moved to arrange a meeting with Nimeiry, expecting the regime to change its course. The meeting was set at the Khartoum Racing Club, in April 1972. The Democratic Unionist Party and other parties waited to hear a speech from President Nimeiry of national reconciliation. Nimeiry ended up not making the announcement.

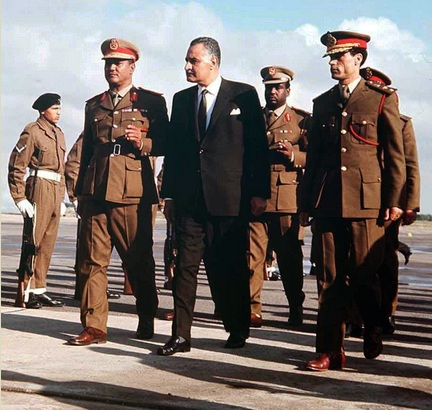
Nimeiry, Nasser and Gaddafi in Tripoli shortly after both Nimeiry and Gaddafi’s 1969 coup d'état

Despite Sharif Hussein al-Hindi's adherence to the principles of democracy, he was convinced that the use of armed forces to overthrow the Nimeiry's government was necessary. Sharif Hussein, who was head of the National Front, decided to move the resistance camps from the Ethiopian border to Libya with the help of Colonel Muammar Gaddafi who felt that Gaafar Nimeiry had betrayed the Arabs due to the signing of the 1972 Addis Ababa Agreement with predominantly Christian southern Sudan, ending the First Sudanese Civil War. Nimeiry also promised to join the Federation of Arab Republics (FAR) in 1971 but did not join until Libya abandoned the FAR in 1976. Gaddafi began establishing camps and started stockpiling weapons in their base. The new camps were established in Ma'tan as-Sarra, Kufra District.

Sharif laid out his plan to capture Khartoum, as when it is occupied, the regime would fall. Sharif Hussein supervised the establishment of training camps in Libya and sought the help of the Muslim Brotherhood.

Sadiq al-Mahdi was released from the detention centre in late 1972, and immediately fled Sudan and started watching the progress of the training operations. Sharif relinquished the presidency of the National Front to Sadiq al-Mahdi, who began a new phase after the failure of the Shaaban uprising in 1973 and the failure of Hassan Hussein Othman's coup in 1975.

Sudan's General Intelligence Service knew about the plan and kept quiet about it, and began monitoring and following up the affairs of the camps in Libya. As for the military intelligence, it adhered to the traditional pattern of military coups, despite being enlightened that there was a possibility of an attack by an invading force on the morning of 2 July 1976.

== The coup ==
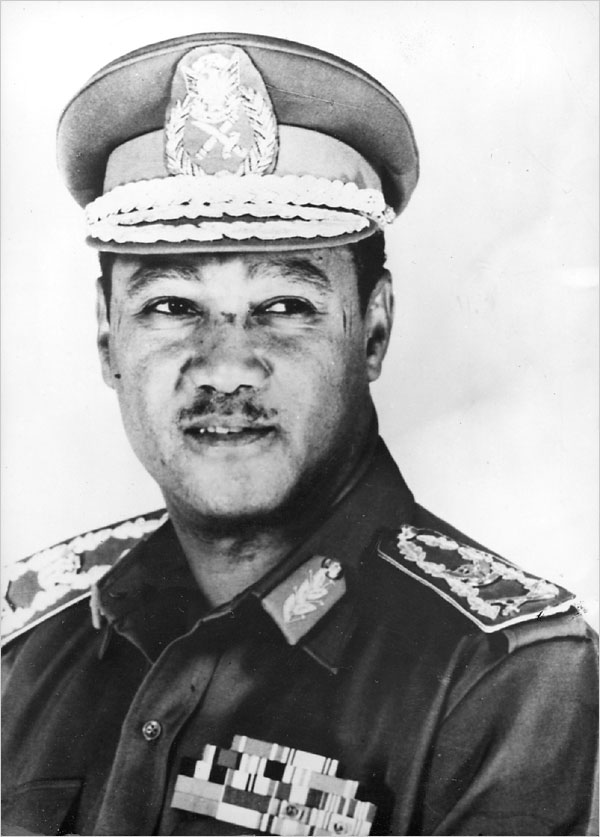
Field Marshal Gaafar Nimeiry ruled after the 1969 coup d'état

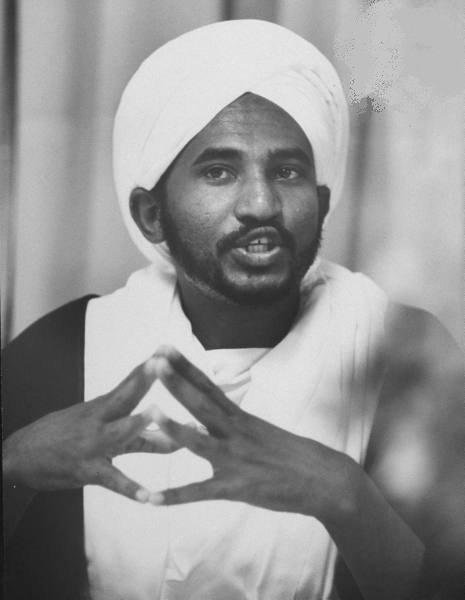
Al-Sadiq al-Mahdi, the opposition leader in exile and the mastermind behind the coup attempt

Two thousand followers of Sudanese opposition leader Sadiq al-Mahdi stormed Khartoum after leaving the oasis and crossing northern Darfur and Kordofan. The troops were commanded by Lieutenant Colonel Muhammad Nour Saad who was fired from the Sudanese Armed Forces in 1974 after being accused of plotting a coup. To avoid drawing attention, they arrived in Khartoum inconspicuously, disguising themselves in traditional Sudanese white robes and staying at local hotels. Each member carried two suitcases; one filled with money and one with a disassembled machine gun and ammunition. The group comprised various political dissidents who sought refuge in Libya under Muammar Gaddafi's protection. They believed that the Sudanese people would embrace them as liberators, thanks to Gaddafi's support and weaponry.

The rebel officers reportedly initiated the coup the moment Nimeiry arrived at Khartoum airport at dawn on that day coming from official visits to Washington, D.C. and Paris. Their plan was to arrest the President Nimeiry, but their attempt was met with resistance from loyalist forces.

On Friday, 2 July 1976 at three o'clock in the afternoon, the residents of some areas in Khartoum heard the sound of gunshots and the sound of bombs in separate areas of the capital. The attackers uniforms were different from the military uniform, consisting of long white pants, and a long white "Araqi" shirt over it. The attackers asked passers-by about the location of the General Command Headquarter which was later surrounded. The residents of Khartoum were terrified by this foreign group and did not welcome them as liberators. Many suffered and died as a result, holding the sentiment that though President Nimeiry might be a dictator, he was still their own.

With the intensity of fighting increasing in intensity in several places in the centre of Khartoum, families rushed to stay in their homes, but what increased people's anxiety, that the radio transmission had completely stopped broadcasting, and the phones were broken due to the Telecommunications Authority falling into the hands of the militant. Despite their lack of knowledge of the geography of Khartoum and Omdurman, they were able to occupy the most important centres and main streets in Khartoum and imposed their full control over them.

The insurgents engaged in three days of house-to-house fighting in Khartoum and Omdurman which killed some 30,00 people. Officers and soldiers in the armed forces, who were at the time in their homes, could not reach the general command, as all the main and secondary roads leading to the command were located under the grip of the militants, who, with their sub-machine guns outmatched the Sudanese army, forcing them to retreat to the desert on the opposite side of the Nile. The Khartoum International Airport had been under their for three full days, during which they prevented the landing or take-off of planes and greatly damaged airport buildings. Bona Malwal, Minister of Culture and Information at the time, and Abel Alier, Second Vice President of Sudan, continued to broadcast the news from Juba instead of Omdurman and painted the coup as an invasion by "mercenaries". During that time, Nimeiry was able to rally the nation via Radio Juba.

Nimeiry confirmed through a speech over the radio to the people, that the country had been subjected to an invasion by mercenaries who came from Libya with the aim of changing the status quo in the country, and that many of these mercenaries were still in the capital. Nimeiry issued his strict directives to each officers and soldiers to "eliminate mercenaries without mercy or pity".

The insurgent army held Khartoum for a while, but their supplies eventually ran out. The usual food shipments from rural areas were halted by Nimeiry's forces, and the city's inhabitants were unwilling to part with their small stashes of food. After a week of starvation, the insurgent army, despite their weapons advantage, could not continue fighting without sustenance. Taking advantage of this weakness, Nimeiry's forces re-entered Khartoum.

On 5 July at eleven o'clock in the morning, the armed forces began to recover the important sites in Khartoum, and after unequal battles between the two parties in terms of equipment and military equipment. El-Sa'ka Forces landed on the roof of the Telecommunications Authority building. A fierce battle took place that increased the destruction of the building and equipment, the battle ended with 124 dead from both sides. After which the armed forces occupied the building and surrounded it with armoured vehicles The armed forces also easily recovered the radio and television building. Captured militants were immediately executed. The loyalist forces retook al-Shagara Tanks Military Camp. A column of army tanks entered the city and roamed the streets of Khartoum with no resistance from the surviving armed militia.

== Aftermath ==
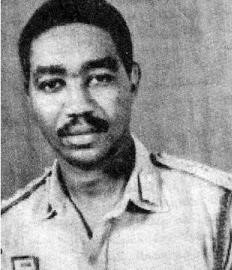
The field commander of the coup, ex-military Lieutenant Colonel Muhammad Nour Saad, was captured and executed

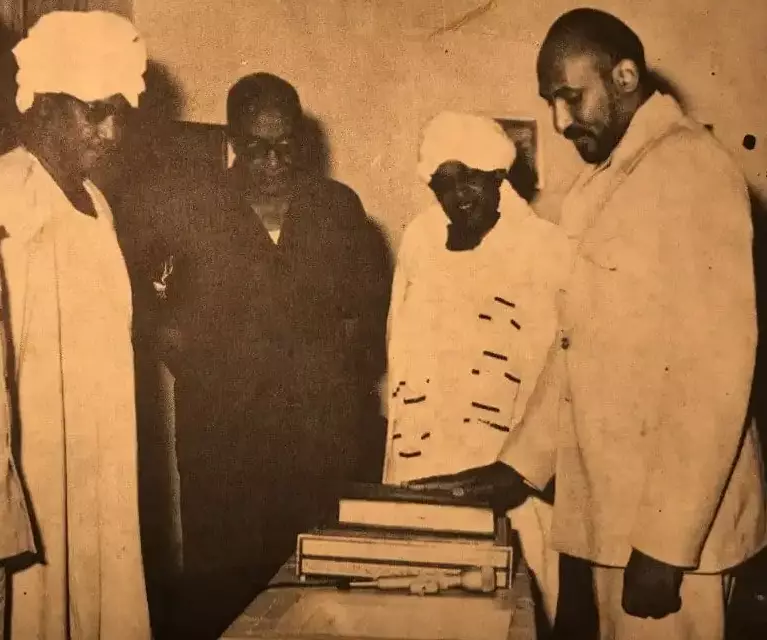
to the contrary, Sadiq al-Mahdi was sworn into the Nimeriy government after the 1977 National Reconciliation

Once the coup's failure was announced by the Sudanese Government, a "mopping-up" operations started with searching for the militants. Many foreigners and expatriates from neighbouring countries, who originally had no interest in the events in Khartoum, were arrested. They were dragged to the Green Belt area, south of Khartoum, where they were executed without trials, including many Ethiopians and Eritreans. One officer said "We used to order the detainees to dig graves, and after they finished digging and deepening them, we would order them to lie down inside. Then the soldiers would shoot, and another batch of detainees will fill the graves and dig new ones."

Some 3,000 were killed during the coup, and 98 people were implicated and executed for plotting the coup, including Muhammad Nour Saad.

The coup attempt sparked national resentment against Libyan leader Muammar Gaddafi. In 1977, a national reconciliation took place between Sadiq al Mahdi, the leader of the opposition who was based abroad, and Nimeiry. A limited measure of pluralism was allowed and Sadiq al Mahdi and members of the Democratic Unionist Party joined the legislature under the umbrella of the Sudanese Socialist Union. Hassan al-Turabi, an Islamist leader who had been imprisoned and then exiled after the May Revolution, was invited back and became Justice Minister and Attorney General in 1979. Relations between Khartoum and Southern Sudan leadership worsened after the National Reconciliation due to the shift to Sharia law, and adopting Arabic as the country official language. The National Reconciliation itself came to a premature end in light of disagreements between the opposition and Nimeiry.
