= Yol =

Yol, YoL, or YOL may refer to:

== People ==
- Yol (Korean name), a Korean given name (includes a list of people with the name)
- Yol Pranvarin, a Thai-Nepali actress
- Yol Aularong, a Cambodian musician
- Elizabeth Acuei Yol, a South Sudanese politician

== Other uses ==
- Yol (film), a 1982 Turkish drama
- Year of Luigi, a 2013–2014 event by Nintendo to celebrate the fictional character Luigi
- Yola Airport, an airport in Jimeta, Nigeria
- Yol, Himachal Pradesh, a neighborhood of Dharmshala, Himachal Pradesh, India
- Yola dialect, an Anglic dialect spoken in County Wexford, Ireland, UK

== See also ==
- Y'all, an English word
