= National Reconciliation (Sudan) =

Reconciliation in Sudan in 1977

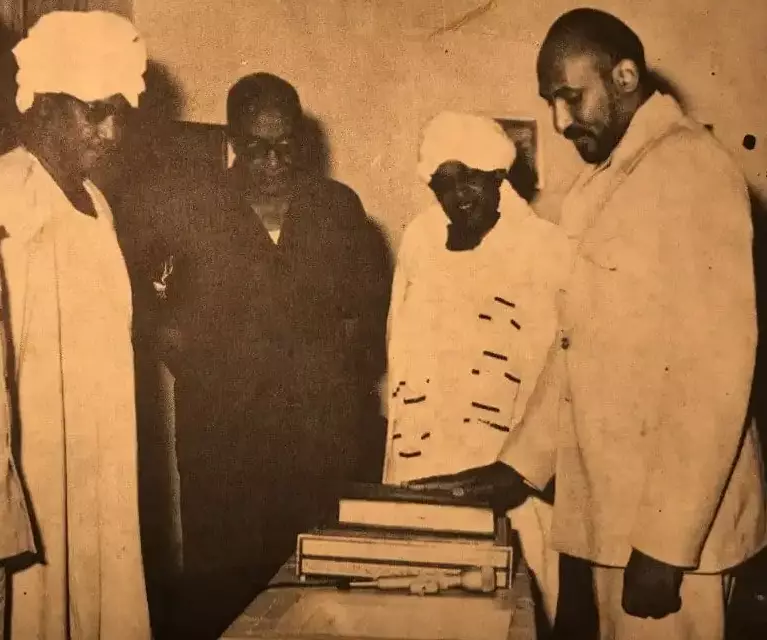
Sadiq al-Mahdi (far right) being sworn into Nimeiri's (far left) government after the 1977 National Reconciliation.

Following the 1976 coup attempt, a national reconciliation (Arabic: المصالحة الوطنية) was reached in Sudan on 7 July 1977, where Nimeiri and al-Mahdi signed an agreement that readmitted the opposition in exchange for the dissolution of the National Front. Civil liberties were restored, and political prisoners were released. The reconciliation also involved shifts in Sudanese politics, with the adoption of Islamic law, known as September Laws, in 1983. Nimeiri faced opposition from various groups, including secularised Muslims and non-Muslim southerners. This move contributed to the resumption of the civil war in the south, leading to conflicts and political shifts.

The years that followed saw further political discontent against Nimeiri, primarily due to the imposition of sharia and economic austerity. This discontent culminated in the 1985 revolution, where mass protests and a general strike led to a bloodless military coup, ousting Nimeiri from power.

== Background ==
In early 1972, Gaafar Nimeiri visited Saudi Arabia and engaged in dialogue with Sharif Hussein al-Hindi, the opposition leader, at the request of King Faisal of Saudi Arabia. The dialogue revolved around addressing past grievances and the political landscape. Nimeiri attributed past massacres to communists while Sharif criticized Nimeiri's regime. Offers and suggestions were exchanged, including Nimeiri proposing the Vice Presidency to Sharif, but no agreement was reached. Disappointed with the outcome, Sharif planned an attack on Khartoum with Libyan support.

Sadiq al-Mahdi joined the opposition and orchestrated a coup attempt in 1976, storming Khartoum with dissident forces led by Muhammad Nour Saad on 2 July. Their attempt to arrest Nimeiri was met with resistance, and the ensuing battle caused significant civilian casualties. Despite taking control initially, the rebel forces faced supply shortages and eventually succumbed to loyalist troops, ending the coup after a week. The aftermath involved searches, arrests, and executions of suspected plotters.

== The reconciliation ==
Following the 1976 coup attempt, Gaafar Nimeiri and his opponents adopted more conciliatory policies. In early 1977, government officials met with the National Front in London, and arranged for a conference between Nimeiri and Sadiq al Mahdi in Port Sudan. In what became known as the "national reconciliation," the two leaders signed, on 7 July 1977, an eight-point agreement that readmitted the opposition to national life in return for the dissolution of the National Front. The agreement also restored civil liberties, freed political prisoners, reaffirmed Sudan's nonaligned foreign policy, and promised to reform local government.

== Aftermath ==
As a result of the reconciliation, the government released about 1,000 detainees and granted an amnesty to Sadiq al Mahdi, who was sentenced to death in absentia. The Sudanese Socialist Union (SSU) also admitted former supporters of the National Front to its ranks. Sadiq renounced multiparty politics and urged his followers to work within the regime's one-party system. Hassan al-Turabi, the leader of the Muslim Brotherhood party an dean of law at the University of Khartoum who had been imprisoned and then exiled after the May Revolution, was also released and became Justice Minister and Attorney General in 1979. Sharif Hussein al-Hindi, a previous Finance Minister who led the National Unionist Party, stood against the President's peace proposal. However, he ultimately endorsed a reconciliation accord in London. While the leaders have made their way back, the 5,000 insurgence located in Libya and Ethiopia remain absent. The Government intends to dispatch delegates to visit the camps with the aim of convincing them to return. Additionally, efforts have been initiated to improve the previously tense relations with Addis Ababa and Tripoli.

However, relations between Khartoum and the South Sudan leadership worsened after the National Reconciliation due to the shift to Sharia law, and adopting Arabic as the country official language.

=== Sharia laws ===
Nimeiri's attempt at implementing an "Islamic path" in Sudan from 1977 to 1985, including aligning with religious factions, ultimately failed. His transition from nationalist leftist ideologies to strict Islam was detailed in his books "Al-Nahj al-Islami limadha?" and "Al-Nahj al-Islami kayfa?" The connection between Islamic revival and reconciling with opponents of the 1969 revolution coincided with the rise of militant Islam in other parts of the world. Nimeiri's association with the Abu Qurun Sufi order influenced his shift towards Islam, leading him to appoint followers of the order into significant roles. The process of legislating the "Islamic path" began in 1983, culminating in the enactment of various orders and acts to implement sharia law and other Islamic principles.

In September 1983, President Jaafar Nimeiri introduced sharia law in Sudan, known as September laws, symbolically disposing of alcohol and implementing hudud punishments like public amputations. Al-Turabi supported this move, differing from Al-Sadiq al-Mahdi's dissenting view. Al-Turabi and his allies within the regime also opposed self-rule in the south, a secular constitution, and non-Islamic cultural acceptance. The Islamic economy followed in early 1984, eliminating interest and instituting zakat. Nimeiri declared himself the imam of the Sudanese Umma in 1984. Opposition to Nimeiri's Islamization came from various quarters. Southerners, northern secular and religious voices, and even the judiciary voiced concerns about the undemocratic implementation and lack of consultation. Sadiq al-Mahdi, leader of the Umma Party, initially jailed for his opposition.

=== Transition to democracy ===
The first test of national reconciliation occurred during the February 1978 People's Assembly elections. Nimeiri authorised returning exiles who had been associated with the old Umma Party, the National Unionist Party, and the Muslim Brotherhood to stand for election as independent candidates. These independents won 140 of 304 seats, leading many observers to applaud Nimeiri's efforts to democratise Sudan's political system. However, the People's Assembly elections marked the beginning of further political decline. The SSU's failure to sponsor official candidates weakened party discipline and prompted many assembly deputies who also were SSU members to claim that the party had betrayed them. As a result, an increasing number of assembly deputies used their offices to advance personal rather than national interests.

The end of the SSU's political monopoly, coupled with rampant corruption at all levels of government, cast increasing doubt on Nimeiri's ability to govern Sudan. To preserve his regime, Nimeiri adopted a more dictatorial leadership style. He ordered the State Security Organisation to imprison without trial thousands of opponents and dissidents. Nimeiri also dismissed or transferred any minister or senior military officer who appeared to be developing their own power base. Nimeiri selected replacements based on their loyalty to him rather than on their abilities. This strategy caused the president to lose touch with popular feeling and the country's deteriorated political situation.

=== The Libyan-Sudanese crisis ===
In 1980 and 1981, Sudan faced significant challenges due to Libya's involvement in Chad and its complex relationship with Libya's Muammar Gaddafi. Tensions were further exacerbated by a history of mistrust and the fallout from a failed coup attempt in Khartoum in July 1976, in which Libyan elements played a role. This event strained Sudan-Libya relations, but over time, some of the coup plotters, including Sadiq al-Mahdi and Husayn al-Hindi, returned to Sudan, leading to a temporary improvement in relations.

The situation in Chad, a country divided along religious lines, added further complexity. Sudan's involvement in brokering a ceasefire in February 1978 was short-lived, and Libya's claim to the resource-rich Aozou Strip only deepened regional tensions. In December 1980, Libyan forces occupied Chad's capital, N'Djamena, leading to concerns about the possibility of a Chado-Libyan union, which raised alarm bells in Khartoum and Cairo. Sudan found itself supporting Chadian rebels, mainly from its Darfur region, which increased tensions. Libyan airstrikes on Darfur border villages prompted the U.S. to offer more support to Sudan. Although a full-scale Libyan invasion was unlikely, Sudan remained cautious due to past Libyan-backed coup attempts and took measures like detentions and military deployments to protect its stability.

The eventual withdrawal of Libyan troops from Chad and the events that followed were not fully disclosed. Chadian President Goukouni Oueddei appeared to request their withdrawal, which Gaddafi complied with, and they were replaced by an Organization of African Unity (OAU) peacekeeping force partially funded by France. There were unconfirmed reports of a last-minute coup attempt by Libyan elements in Chad, but this seemed exaggerated.

The tensions between Sudan and Chad, primarily fuelled by the Libyan presence in Chad, eased after the Libyan withdrawal. Sudan and Chad restored normal diplomatic ties, and President Nimeiri and President Oueddei established a working relationship, including an agreement to establish a "ministerial committee" to prevent Chadian rebels from using Sudan as a base. However, Gaddafi's hostility toward the Nimeiri regime in Sudan persisted. There were concerns that Libya might continue its efforts to undermine the Khartoum government. Gaddafi maintained connections with anti-Nimeiri Sudanese groups in Libya and Ethiopia, and the tripartite pact between Libya, Southern Yemen, and Ethiopia remained a potential challenge to Nimeiri. This situation continued to pose a threat to Darfur and remained a challenge for U.S. policy in the region.
