= 1965 Juba and Wau massacres =

Massacres during the first Sudanese civil war

- Location: 4°51′14″N 31°34′57″E and 7°42′00″N 28°00′00″E; Juba and Wau, South Sudan
- Date: July 1965
- Target: Non-arabs
- Attack type: Mass murder; Collective punishment
- Weapon: Guns
- Deaths: +3,000
- Perpetrator: Sudanese Armed Forces

The 1965 Juba and Wau massacres were killings of civilians by the Sudanese army in Juba and Wau, in what is now South Sudan, during the First Sudanese Civil War. The massacres occurred in July 1965, during the premiership of Muhammad Ahmad Mahgoub, whose government pursued military operations against southern towns. Reported casualty figures vary, but historian Deng D. Akol Ruay estimated that between 1,000 and 3,000 people were killed in Juba, while 76 civilians were killed in Wau. The attacks drew condemnation from the Southern Front, whose newspaper, The Vigilant, was suspended after publishing articles about the killings.

== Background ==
The First Sudanese Civil War began on 18 August 1955, when members of the Equatorial Corps mutinied in Torit against their northern commanders. The mutiny developed into a secessionist movement known as the Anyanya, which included former Torit mutineers and southern students. The movement gained ground from 1963 to 1969.

Several reported atrocities during the war occurred under the government of Prime Minister Muhammad Ahmad Mahgoub, a civilian elected leader who took office on 10 June 1965. Historian Deng D. Akol Ruay wrote that Mahgoub's war policies included attacks on southern towns that caused thousands of civilian deaths.

== The massacres ==
=== Massacre in Juba ===
On 8 July 1965, soldiers in Juba opened fire on civilians, with the attacks beginning at about 8 a.m. and continuing into the following day. The official explanation, given by the Minister of the Interior, was that the killings followed an unsuccessful attack on Sudanese military headquarters in Juba. This account was disputed by one witness, who said the violence began after a quarrel between northern soldiers and southern civilians over a prostitute. According to the witness, the dispute led to the stabbing of a soldier, after which other soldiers began killing civilians.

Witnesses described the Juba massacre as marked by extreme violence and said soldiers targeted non-Arabs. The number of casualties is uncertain. Historian Deng D. Akol Ruay estimated that between 1,000 and 3,000 people were killed. Other sources have alleged that around 1,400 civilians died in the massacre.

=== The massacre in Wau ===
Two days after the start of the Juba massacre, on 10 July, a second massacre occurred in Wau. The massacre happened during a wedding, when Sudanese soldiers surrounded the house and began firing in to it. The massacre killed 76 civilians most them being part of the educated southern elites. The government had claimed that the people attending the wedding were Anyanya rebels who fired first at soldiers, but South Sudanese politician Clement Mboro adamantly denied this, stating that they had all been intellectuals.

=== Other massacres ===
Other massacres were also carried in July by Sudanese troops. On July 4, 150 people were massacred in Torit. Kapoeta was attacked on 11 of July killing 87 civilians and on 15 June, 450 people were killed in Yei.

== Aftermath ==
The newly formed Southern Front described the attack as an "attempt at killing all the educated South Sudanese in the area". The group issued a memorandum urging the government to establish an investigation into the killings. The memorandum also disputed the government's claim that about 400 people were killed in the massacre.

The Southern Front's newspaper, The Vigilant, published articles about the massacre, describing the killings as "barbaric and brutal" and accusing the government of attempting to "depopulate the south". The articles led to the newspaper's suspension from July 1965 to January 1966.

== Bibliography ==
- Poggo, Scopas (2009). The First Sudanese Civil War Africans, Arabs, And Israelis In The Southern Sudan, 1955-1972. Palgrave Macmillan. ISBN 9780230607965.
