= Clement Mboro =

South Sudanese politician (1920–2006)

Clement Gudiya Mboro

Minister of State for Southern Affairs
- In office 1964–1969
- President: Sirr Al-Khatim Al-Khalifa

Personal details
- Born: 1920
- Died: 17 June 2006 (aged 86) Nairobi, Kenya
- Cause of death: Old age
- Party: Southern Front
- Education: Bussure Catholic school
- Alma mater: University of Khartoum

Clement Gudiya Mboro (1920–2006) was a prominent Southern Sudanese politician, who became the first South Sudanese to be appointed as the Interior Minister of Sudan. Mboro also served as a District commissioner in Southern Sudan and the Speaker of the Southern Sudan Regional Assembly.

== Biography ==
=== Early life 1920-1962 ===
Clement Gudiya Mboro was born in Mboro, Western Bahr El Ghazal in 1920. He belonged to the Ndogo tribe which a part of the larger tribal coalition of Fertit. Mboro participated in the Juba Conference of 1947, where the British colonial officials and Sudanese separatist delegates were negotiating the future of the Anglo-Egyptian Sudan. After the Torit Mutiny, Mboro then the Assistant District Commissioner of Yirol was imprisoned twice. First in 1955 for "conspiring to kill the Arabs in Yirol". He was released in 1956 and appointed as the District Commissioner of Juba in 1957. Mboro was jailed again for two years in 1960.

=== Minister of Interior and Industry 1962-1969 ===
After being released from prison Mboro served as the Assistant governor of Port Sudan and the Deputy Governor of Darfur. In October 1964 when General Ibrahim Abboud stepped down and was replaced by a government led by Sirr Al-Khatim Al-Khalifa, Mboro became the first Southern to be appointed as the Interior Minister of Sudan. After the fall of Abbouds government Mboro co-established the Southern Front (SF) political movement, which supported Anyanya activities through fund-raising. Mboro remained a supporter of the SF, while holding the position of the Interior Minister describing himself as “Minister [of Interior] by day and Anya-Nya at night.” After gaining the seat of the Interior Minister, Mboro started an tour of the Southern Sudan visiting sites of previous massacres and major cities. On December 7, 1964, Khartoum witnessed deadly race riots after the return of Mboro from Southern Sudan was unexpectedly delayed. The delaying of the flight lead to the Southern Sudanese living in Khartoum to believe that Mboro was assassinated and to start rioting. The riots reportedly killed around 10 people and injured 400. In 1965 Mboro was appointed as the Minister of Industry in the Government of Ismail al-Azhari, which lasted until overthrown by Sudanese Military Officer Gaafar Nimeiry on 25 May 1969.

=== Addis Ababa Agreement and Southern Autonomous Region 1969-1983 ===
After the coup Mboro was arrested for being the member of the deposed government and later imprisoned on charges of corruption. Mboro was released two years later when the Addis Ababa Agreement was signed. Mboro criticized the Agreement, which brought the end to the First Sudanese Civil War, stating that Nimeirys primary aim was "to collect arms from the Anya-Nya". After the agreement Mboro was appointed as the Chairman of the Relief and Rehabilitation Commission, which was responsible for the resettlement of the South Sudanese refugees returning from abroad. Mboro was also the Speaker of the People's Regional Assembly in the Southern Sudan Autonomous Region from 1978 to 1979.

=== In Exile 1983-2006 ===
After the collapse of the Addis Ababa Agreement and the implementation of the September Laws in 1983 Mboro fled to Kenya where he died in poverty on 17 July 2006. Mboro is buried at the Clement Mboro's mausoleum in Wau Freedom Square.

== Personal life ==
Mboro had reportedly three wives and nine children.

== Bibliography ==
- Poggo, Scopas (2009). The First Sudanese Civil War Africans, Arabs, And Israelis In The Southern Sudan, 1955-1972. Palgrave Macmillan. ISBN 9780230607965.
- Malwal, Bona (2015). Sudan and South Sudan From One to Two (PDF). Palgrave Macmillan. ISBN 1137437138.
- Nyibong Ding, Daniel Thabo (20 November 2025). "The Impact of Change Agents on Southern Sudan History 1898 – 1973" (PDF). UKR Journal of Arts, Humanities and Social Sciences. doi:10.5281/zenodo.17657586.
