= The Vigilant =

- Editor: Bona Malual Madut Ring
- Founded: March 23, 1965
- Ceased publication: May 1969
- Political alignment: Southern Front
- Language: English language
- Headquarters: Khartoum
- OCLC number: 27375336

The Vigilant was an English-language newspaper published from Khartoum, Sudan. The first issue was published on March 23, 1965. It was an organ of the Southern Front. It functioned as a relatively well-written informative newsletter, and became the mouthpiece of the Southern movement in general and the Southern Front in particular. Effectively it was the sole press outlet for Southern opinions.

Bona Malual Madut Ring (the general secretary of the Southern Front) was the editor of The Vigilant. Darurs Beshar was the registered proprietor of the publication.

Publication of The Vigilant was interrupted between July 1965 and January 1966. The suspension was issued on July 15, 1965, following the publishing of articles about the recent massacres in Juba and Wau. The Vigilant had held the government responsible for what it called 'barbaric and brutal killing'. The newspaper claimed that there had been 1,400 casualties and 76 killed (out of whom 49 victims would have been Southern Sudanese government employees, killed in Wau on Mau 8–9). Furthermore, the publication argued that the incidents was "not accident but part and parcel of a plan to depopulate the south". Copies of the newspaper commenting on the massacres were seized. Darurs Beshar and Bona Malual were arrested and tried in court. They were eventually acquitted of any criminal acts.

The publishing frequency of The Vigilant varied. For some periods it was issued daily. Between November 1967 and April 1968 it appeared on a weekly basis.

The Vigilant was closed down in May 1969.
