= Southern Sudan Legislative Assembly =

Interim legislature of South Sudan (2005–2011)

Type
- Type: Unicameral

History
- Established: 2005
- Disbanded: 2011
- Preceded by: People's Regional Assembly
- Succeeded by: Transitional National Legislature of South Sudan

Leadership
- Speaker: James Wani Igga (last)

Structure
- Seats: 170
- Political groups: Government (161): Sudan People's Liberation Movement (161); Opposition (9): Sudan People's Liberation Movement–Democratic Change (1); National Congress Party (1); Independents (7)

Elections
- Voting system: Mixed member majoritarian: 102 seats are elected by First-past-the-post; 43 seats reserved for women are elected by Closed list proportional representation with 4% electoral threshold; 25 seats unreserved are elected by Closed list proportional representation with 4% electoral threshold
- Last election: 11–15 April 2010

Meeting place
- Ministries Complex; Juba; Southern Sudan

Website
- Government of Southern Sudan (permanent dead link)

The Southern Sudan Legislative Assembly was established in 2005 by the interim constitution of the Southern Sudan Autonomous Region. Pending elections in 2010, all 170 members were appointed according to the following formula as per the Comprehensive Peace Agreement (CPA):

- 70% of seats to SPLM.
- 15% of seats to NCP.
- 15% of seats to other parties.

The Legislative Assembly met in Juba, the capital of Southern Sudan and Central Equatoria State.

The last and arguably most historic sitting of the Assembly took place on 9 July 2011 at approximately 1.30 pm (Juba time) when the Declaration of Independence of South Sudan was read by James Wani Igga, Speaker of the Southern Sudan Legislative Assembly. It was read at an open parliamentary session (sitting number 27-2011) of the Assembly in front of a large assembled audience at the John Garang Mausoleum in Juba, South Sudan.

Following the independence of the Republic of South Sudan, a new legislature was established in terms of the country's constitution. It together with the Council of States of South Sudan is the new National Legislature of South Sudan.

== Latest elections ==
=== President ===
Candidate	Party	Votes	%
Salva Kiir Mayardit	Sudan People's Liberation Movement	2,616,613	92.99
Lam Akol	Sudan People's Liberation Movement–Democratic Change	197,217	7.01
Total		2,813,830	100.00
Total votes		2,813,830	–
Registered voters/turnout		4,539,835	61.98
Source: National Electoral Commission

=== Legislative Assembly ===
Party	Votes	%	Seats
Sudan People's Liberation Movement			161
Sudan People's Liberation Movement–Democratic Change			1
National Congress Party			1
Independents			7
Total			170
Registered voters/turnout	4,539,835	–	
Source: National Electoral Commission

== Members of the Legislative Assembly by party ==
Party	Acronym	Leader	MPs
Sudan People's Liberation Movement	SPLM	Dr. Ann Itto (for Southern sector)	112
National Congress Party	NCP	Riek Gai Kok (for Southern sector)	25
Union of Sudan African Parties 1	USAP 1	Joseph Ukel	7
Union of Sudan African Parties 2	USAP 2	James Elioba Sururu	4
United Democratic Sudan Forum	UDSF	N/A	4
South Sudan Democratic Forum	SSDF	Dr. Martin Elia Lomuro	4
United Democratic Front	UDF	Peter Abdrhaman Sule	4
Sudan African National Union	SANU	Dr. Toby Maduot	4
Sudan People's Liberation Movement–Democratic Change	SPLM-DC	Lam Akol	4
South Sudan Defense Force	SSDF	Paulino Matip Nhial	3
Appointed Members	N/A	N/A	3

== Speakers ==
Name	Took office	Left office	Notes
James Wani Igga	2005	2011	Speaker of the Southern Sudan Legislative Assembly

== See also ==
- National Legislative Assembly of South Sudan
- National Legislature of South Sudan
