= Southern Democratic Party (Sudan) =

The Southern Democratic Party was a political party in Sudan. The party was founded in 1966 by Joseph Garang, who served as the general secretary of the party. The party was generally seen as the Southern wing of the Sudanese Communist Party.

The SDP advocated regional autonomy and democratization. Garang called for a Southern anti-imperialist movement aligned with democratic movements across the country, and rejected separatist groups as reactionary. The party faced opposition from other Southern groups. The Southern Democratic Party fielded two candidates in the March 1967 parliamentary by-elections.

In April 1968 the SDP joined the Union of Socialist Forces, a joint electoral front including the Communist Party, Socialist Republic Party, the Federation of Sudanese Workers Union, the Peasants Union and progressive independents. SDP fielded three candidates in the 1968 parliamentary election, out of whom two finished in second place.
