= Sudanese Nile Party =

The Sudanese Nile Party (Arabic: حزب النيل السوداني) was a political party in Sudan, led by Philemon Majok. The party was founded in 1967 and was based in Bahr al-Ghazal. It contested five seats in the 1968 Constituent Assembly election, and won one. In total the party obtained 2,704 votes (0.15% of the national vote).
