= Workers' Forces =

The Workers' Forces was a political party in Sudan. It was founded in 1967 and led by radical trade union leaders, particularly amongst the railway workers. The Workers Forces contested the Atbara seat in the 1968 Constituent Assembly election. Its candidate, Al-Hajj Abdurrahman, won the seat with 5,204 votes (0.29% of the national vote). Al-Hajj was one of two leaders of the Sudanese Communist Party elected in 1968.
