= Yolanda Wel Deng =

South Sudanese politician

Yolanda Awel Deng is a South Sudanese politician who was the minister of health, in the South Sudan Transitional Government of National Unity cabinet from 2022 to 2025.

She hails from Warrap State of Barhr El Ghazel region.

== Education ==
Yolanda Awel graduated with a Bachelor's degree in Psychology from the University Saskatchewan and later a Master's degree in Conflict Analysis and Management from Royal Road University in Canada.

== Appointment ==
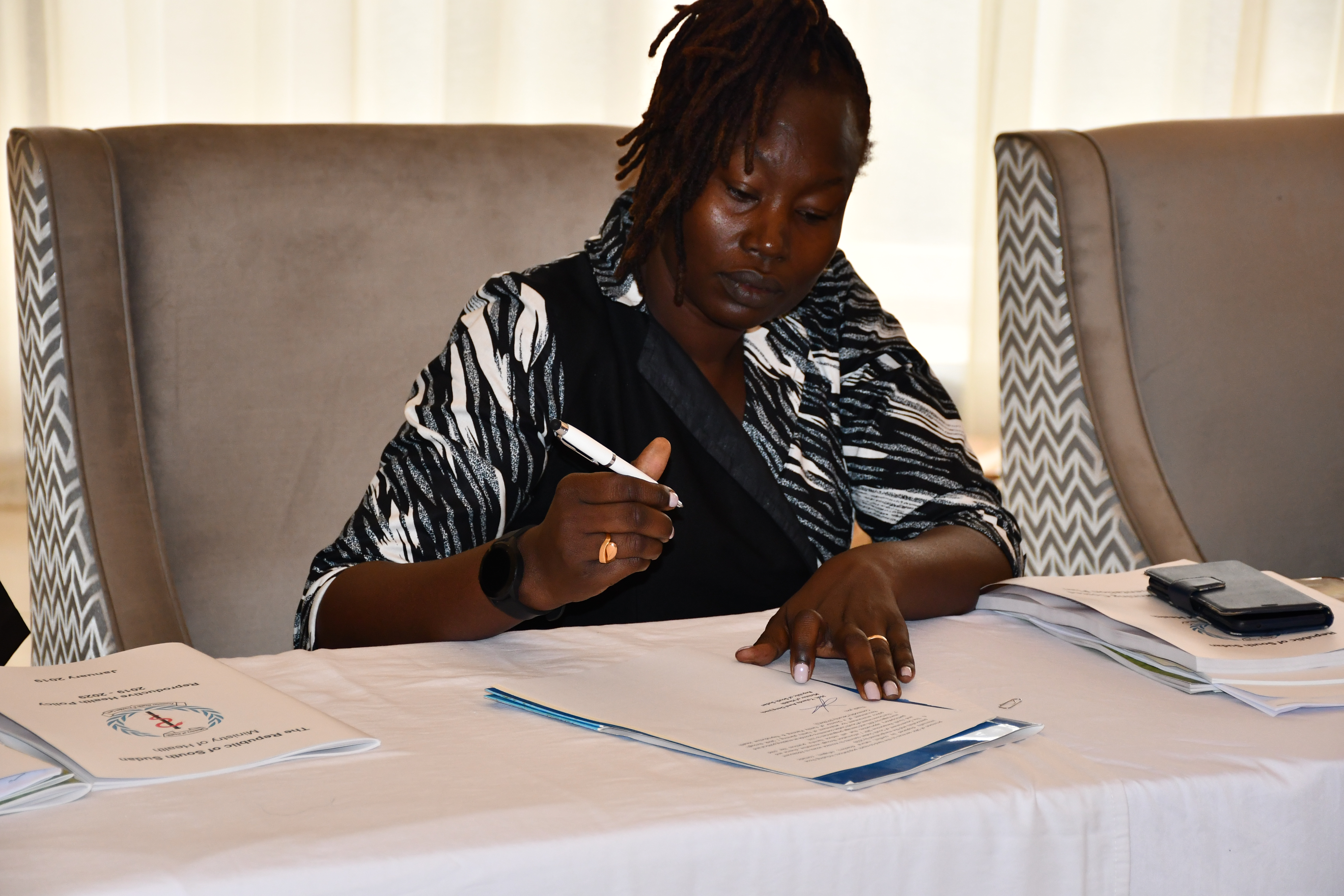
Minister of Health Yolanda Awel Deng

She was appointed by President Salva Kiir as the South Sudan National Minister of Health in March 2022 through the ticket of South Sudan People's Liberation Movement-In Opposition (SPLM-IO), replacing Elizabeth Achuei.

Yolanda Awel Deng married Agel Ring Machar, a former Press Secretary in the office of the then First Vice President, Taban Deng Gai, in 2011. She is a mother of four children: two boys and two girls.

She was sacked on February 11 2025.
