= Joseph James Tombura =

South Sudanese politician (1929–1992)

President of the High Executive Council of the Southern Sudan Autonomous Region
- In office 23 June 1982 – 5 June 1983
- Preceded by: Gismalla Abdalla Rassas
- Succeeded by: Position abolished

Personal details
- Born: September 12, 1929 Wau, Anglo-Egyptian Sudan (present-day South Sudan)
- Died: September 17, 1992 (aged 63) Khartoum, Sudan
- Party: SANU
- Ethnicity: Zande

Joseph James Tombura (12 September 1929 – 17 September 1992) was a South Sudanese politician and member of the Sudan African National Union. He was the president of the High Executive Council of the Southern Sudan Autonomous Region, serving from 23 June 1982 to 5 June 1983, until the Sudanese central government revoked the autonomy of that region. Autonomy was restored in 2005, and six years later, South Sudan became an independent nation.

== Early life and education ==
Tombura was born on 12 September 1929 in Wau. He completed his primary and secondary education at Bussere Elementary School in Wau and Kampala Senior Technical. Afterward, he studied mechanical engineering at Khartoum Technical Institute in 1954. Later, he enrolled at the University of Wisconsin–Milwaukee and received an advanced diploma award in engineering in 1957.

== Career ==
After receiving the advanced diploma, Tombura returned to Sudan and worked as a teacher in various schools in the northern region for 21 years. In 1970, Tombura became the general manager of the Fruit and Vegetable Canning Factory in Wau.

=== Political career ===
Tombura began his political career as the commissioner of Bahr el Ghazal. In 1976, he was appointed the director general of the regional Ministry of Cooperatives and Rural Water for two years. He resigned from civil service to contest the election and was elected as an MP representing the cooperative of Western Equatoria in 1978. Likewise, Joseph Lagu appointed Tombura as the Regional Minister of Public Works from 1978 to 1980. In 1982, he replaced Gismalla Abdalla Rassas as the President of the High Executive Council of the Southern Sudan Autonomous Region. He resigned from the presidency in 1983. Subsequently, he served as the governor of Equatoria from 1983 to 1985.

== Later life ==
Tombura became the chairman of the University of Gezira council. He later felt ill in the late 1980s and went to Bonn in December 1991 for an aortic valve operation. The operation was successful, and he soon returned to Khartoum. However, he got sick and died on 17 September 1992 in Khartoum due to cardiac arrest.
