= Deng Deng Akon =

South Sudanese politician (born 1964)

The Honorable Deng Deng Akon

Speaker of the Council of States
- Incumbent
- Assumed office 2 August 2021
- Preceded by: Joseph Bol Chan

Personal details
- Born: 15 December 1964 (age 61) MarialBai, Aweil West County
- Party: SPLM-IO

Deng Deng Akon (born 15 December 1964) is a South Sudanese politician and a member of the Sudan People's Liberation Movement-in-Opposition. He was elected as Speaker of the House for the Council of States on 2 August 2021.

== Early life ==
Deng was born on 15 December 1964, in MarialBai, Aweil West County of NBG.

== Political career ==
In February 2013, Akon was included on the list of officers from the Sudan People's Liberation Army to be placed on reserve status. He held the rank of Brigadier-General at the time.

In December 2013, Akon was detained along with ten other members of the ruling party, the SPLM, after a failed coup. He was released on 27 December 2013 alongside the ex-minister for higher education, Peter Adwok Nyaba. Akon had formerly served as director in the previous Vice President's office.

In 2020, he was a member of the Cabinet of South Sudan. He was dismissed from the cabinet in July 2021, along with all serving members at the time. On 2 August 2021, he was sworn in as the Speaker for the Council of States alongside the entirety of the Parliament. He urged the separation of powers and adherence to the constitution in an address to the governors and chief administrators of each state at the governor's forum on 22 November 2021.

In August 2022, the Mayom County Commissioner was summarily executed. The Council of States then passed a vote of no confidence in Unity State Governor Dr. Joseph Monytuil. Akon, as the Speaker, received a letter dated 25 August 2022 that the Council was not permitted to pass that vote and would only be able to censure Monytuil with a three-quarter majority of the combined parliament.
