= Muhammad Nour Saad =

Sudanese military officer (died 1976)

Lieutenant Colonel Muhammad Nour Saad
- محمد نور سعد
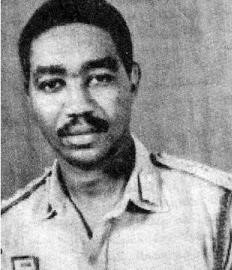

Personal details
- Died: 1976 (executed) Khartoum, Sudan
- Known for: 1976 Sudanese coup attempt

Military service
- Allegiance: Sudanese Armed Forces (until 1974); Umma Party
- Branch/service: Sudanese Army
- Years of service: 1955–1974
- Rank: Lieutenant Colonel
- Battles/wars: First Sudanese Civil War

Muhammad Nour Saad (Arabic: محمد نور سعد, died 1976) was a Sudanese military officer who lead the ground operation for the 1976 coup attempt against the government of then-President Gaafar Nimeiry. The coup was orchestrated by opposition leader Sadiq al-Mahdi and aimed to overthrow the Nimeiri regime, which had ruled Sudan since a 1969 coup.

== Biography ==
Saad graduated from the Sudanese Military Academy in 1955, then he studied mechanical engineering in Germany. He was fired from the Sudanese Armed Forces in 1974 after being accused of plotting a coup. After that he left to Germany.

=== 1976 coup attempt ===
Saad led the armed forces during the coup attempt, which took place on 2 July 1976. The coup was a well-coordinated effort involving rebel forces, including dissident soldiers and civilians, many of whom were trained and armed by Libya under the direction of Muammar Gaddafi. The dissident forces stormed Khartoum, the capital of Sudan, in a bid to seize control of key government installations, including the Presidential Palace, radio stations, and military barracks.

Loyalist forces supporting President Nimeiri fought back, leading to several days of intense fighting in Khartoum. The battle caused significant civilian casualties and damage to the capital. The government forces, backed by tanks, managed to regain control of the city, and the coup was suppressed within a week.

Following the failure of the coup, Saad and other key figures, including 98 soldiers and civilians, were arrested, tried, and executed. The regime also used the failed coup as an opportunity to consolidate power and crack down on opposition forces. Nimeiri's government blamed the coup on foreign interference, particularly Libya, and heightened security measures in the aftermath to prevent future attempts.

In 1977, a national reconciliation took place between Sadiq al Mahdi, the leader of the opposition who was based abroad, and Nimeiry.
