= Council of States (South Sudan) =

Upper house of the National Legislature of South Sudan

Type
- Type: Upper house of the National Legislature of South Sudan

History
- Founded: 2011

Leadership
- Speaker: Deng Deng Akon, SPLM-IO since 2 August 2021
- First Deputy Speaker: Mary Ayen Majok, SPLM since 2 August 2021

Structure
- Seats: 100
- Political groups: SPLM (46); SPLM-IO (27); SSOA (10); Independents (9); Vacant (8)

Elections
- Voting system: Coming soon: Indirect election

Meeting place
- Ministries Complex, Juba, South Sudan

The Council of States is the upper house of the National Legislature of South Sudan. It was established in 2011 by the interim constitution of South Sudan.

== Role ==
The Council of States exercises the following functions:

- initiating legislation on the decentralized system of government and other issues of interest to the states and passing such legislation with two-thirds majority of all representatives;
- issuing resolutions and directives to guide all levels of government;
- overseeing national reconstruction, development and equitable service delivery in the states;
- monitoring the repatriation, relief, resettlement, rehabilitation, reintegration of returnees and internally displaced persons, and reconstruction of disaster and conflict affected areas;
- requesting statements from Governors and national Ministers concerned regarding effective implementation of the decentralized system and devolution of powers and any other issues related to the states;
- legislating for the promotion of a culture of peace, reconciliation and communal harmony among all the people of the states;
- approving changes in state names, capitals and boundaries; and
- performing any other function as determined by the Interim Constitution or the law.

== Composition ==
Before 2021, the Council of States comprised all South Sudanese who were members of the Council of States of Sudan; and twenty representatives appointed by the President of South Sudan. The Council of States was dissolved in May 2021, and a transitional council was reconstituted comprising 100 members appointed by Salva Kiir.

== Speakers of the Council of States ==
| Name | Took office | Left office | Notes |
|---|---|---|---|
| Joseph Bol Chan | 5 August 2011 | May 2021 | |
| Deng Deng Akon | 2 August 2021 | Incumbent | |
