= Gismalla Abdalla Rassas =

Sudanese politician

President of the High Executive Council of the Southern Sudan Autonomous Region
- In office 5 October 1981 – 23 June 1982
- Preceded by: Abel Alier
- Succeeded by: Joseph James Tombura

Personal details
- Born: 1932
- Died: 2013 (aged 80–81)

Gismalla Abdalla Rassas (1932–2013) was a South Sudanese politician and member of the Southern Sudan Liberation Movement. He was the penultimate president of the High Executive Council of the Southern Sudan Autonomous Region, serving from 5 October 1981 to 23 June 1982. He was succeeded by Joseph James Tombura. He was a Muslim.
