= Peter Gatkuoth =

South Sudanese politician (1938–2010)

President of the High Executive Council of the Southern Sudan Autonomous Region
- In office 12 July 1979 – 30 May 1980
- Preceded by: Joseph Lagu
- Succeeded by: Abel Alier

Personal details
- Born: January 1, 1938 South Sudan
- Died: August 26, 2010 (aged 72) Yei, South Sudan
- Cause of death: Assassination by gunshot
- Party: SANU

Peter Gatkuoth (1 January 1938 – 26 August 2010) was a South Sudanese politician. He was the third president of the High Executive Council of the Southern Sudan Autonomous Region, serving from 12 July 1979 to 30 May 1980. He was assassinated in 2010.

== Death ==
On August 26, 2010, Gatkuoth was gunned down by Sergeant Gabriel Majur, a reported drug addict and alcoholic who was one of his soldiers.
