= Isaiah Kulang =

South Sudanese politician (1930–2015)

Isaiah Kulang Mabor Deng Dak Anguany (1930 – 2015) was a South Sudanese politician who was Minister for Communications, Transport and Roads and member of the People's Regional Assembly, in the capital of Juba, serving as Speaker of the House between 1979 and 1980. Kulang was a prominent member of the Southern Front by then and in the late 1980s he participated actively in founding the United Sudan African Party (USAP).

In a 1989 coup by the National Islamic Front, Kulang was arrested and detained for over a month where he was tortured in prison. After his release, the Al Bashir government offered him a state minister position in the Ministry of Social Welfare, which Kulang strongly rejected.

Kulang was the chairman of the Specialized Committee for Social Service and Natural Resources in the Council of States when he died on 1 January 2015 in Khartoum, Sudan.

== Early life and education ==
Kulang was born in Yirol (now in Lakes State) in 1930 to a local chief. His early education began in 1944 at Tonj Elementary School, a British colonial authority school. In 1951, he enrolled in junior secondary school in Rumbek and later was transferred to Khartoum by the government after the 1955 mutiny by Southern Sudanese soldiers. Kulang earned a Diploma in Public Administration from the Institute of Public Administration, Khartoum, in 1965, and an advanced diploma in Wildlife Management at Mweka College, Tanzania (1966-1968). He began his public service career in 1959 as an Assistant Game Reservation Officer at Khartoum Zoo and rose in rank to Inspector of Game Reservation overseeing Dindeer Park in Blue Nile Province and Juba in Equatoria Province when he left civil service for politics in 1960.

== Political career ==
Kulang entered politics in 1960 and secured his first political appointment in 1973 as Commissioner for Bahr el Ghazal Province, in the city of Wau, overseeing the building of Jur River Bridge in Wau. In 1978 Kulang won election to the Second People's Regional Assembly, Juba. He became Speaker of the House on 18 July 1979 until 14 February 1980 when President Nimeiri dissolved the Assembly. He was re-elected to the third regional assembly in 1980 and appointed to the High Executive Council as Minister for Communications, Transport and Roads in 1980. Kulang won re-election to the fourth assembly in 1981.

Kulang was imprisoned in Kober in December 1981 alongside his in Executive Committee colleagues, by President Nimeiri after a warning letter written to him of the consequences of violating the constitution and the Self-Government Act of 1972. He served as a Deputy Governor in Bahr el Ghazal, Wau in 1988. Kulang died in 2015 at a Khartoum hospital.
