= Elizabeth Acuei Yol =

South Sudanese politician

Elizabeth Acuei Yol is a South Sudanese politician, appointed as minister of health by President Salva Kiir in 2020.

== Career ==
In 2020, Acuei met with a Chinese medical expert team in South Sudan and received newly arrived medical donations during a critical moment in the global fight against the COVID-19 virus. In the same year, through the African Regional Certification Commission for Poliomyelitis Eradication (ARCC), she declared South Sudan free of the polio virus.

Olushayo Olu, the World Health Organization representative in South Sudan, paid a courtesy call on Acuei on 27 April 2020.

In March 2022, she was removed from office by Mayardit and replaced as Health Minister with Awel Deng, a lawmaker representing SPLA-IO in the peace parliament.

== Controversies ==
As Health Minister, Acuei suspended Undersecretary Victoria Anib and replaced her with Samson Paul Baba without publicizing the investigation or reason.

After three months, Acuei revoked the suspension after Mayardit and First Vice President Riek Machar requested that she reconcile with Anib.
