= 1965 Sudanese parliamentary election =

- 21 April and 8 May 1965

All 207 seats in Parliament 104 seats needed for a majority
- Registered: 2,257,854
- Turnout: 1,269,584 (56.23%)
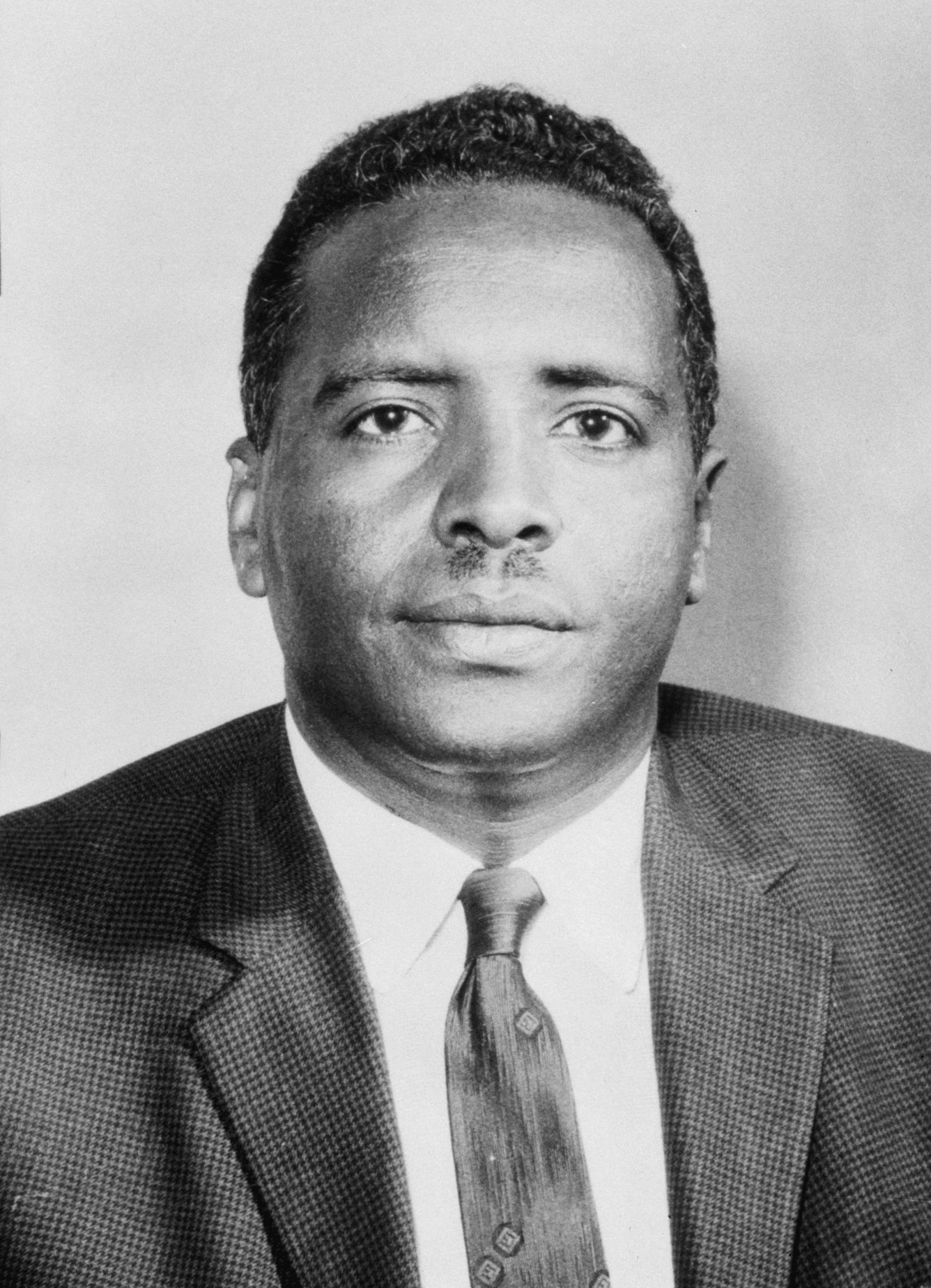

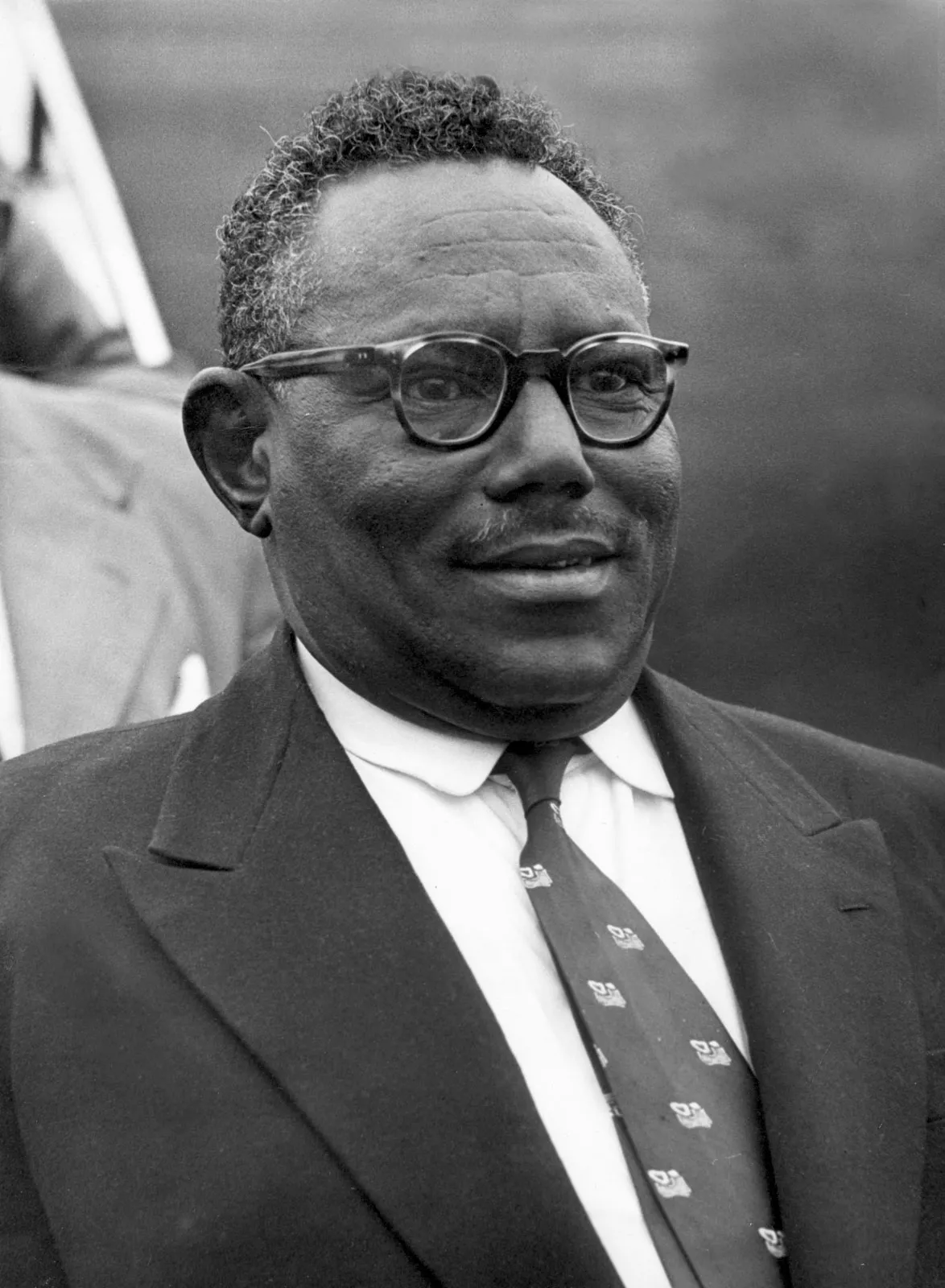
	First party	Second party
Leader	Sirr Al-Khatim Al-Khalifa	Ismail al-Azhari
Party	Umma	National Unionist
Seats won	90	59
Seat change	▲27	▲14
Prime Minister before election
Sirr Al-Khatim Al-Khalifa
NUP
Elected Prime Minister
Muhammad Ahmad Mahgoub
NUP

Parliamentary elections were held in Sudan on 21 April and 8 May 1965. The elections were organized under the Sovereignty Council that had been formed the previous year following the October Revolution. Due to the ongoing First Sudanese Civil War, seats allocated to the Southern Sudan Autonomous Region were left vacant and were not filled until by-elections held in March-April 1967. The elections resulted in a second consecutive victory for the Umma Party, which won 90 of the 173 contested seats. Voter turnout was 56.2%.

== Results ==
Party	Votes	%	Seats	+/–
Umma Party			90	+27
National Unionist Party			59	+14
Beja Congress			10	New
Sudan African National Union			10	New
Sudanese Communist Party			8	New
Islamic Charter Front			5	New
People's Democratic Party			3	−24
Southern Sudan Liberals			1	New
Independents			21	New
Total			207	+34
Total votes	1,269,584	–		
Registered voters/turnout	2,257,854	56.23		
Source: Nohlen et al.

These results include the 1967 by-elections.
