= Joseph Lagu =

South Sudanese politician (1931–2026)

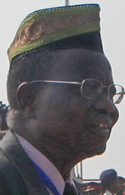
- Lagu in 2011

President of the High Executive Council of the Southern Sudan Autonomous Region
- In office February 1978 – 12 July 1979
- Preceded by: Abel Alier
- Succeeded by: Peter Gatkuoth

Personal details
- Born: 21 November 1931 Momokwe, Moli, Anglo-Egyptian Sudan
- Died: 27 October 2026 (aged 94) Juba, South Sudan
- Children: Josephine Lagu

Joseph Lagu (21 November 1931 – 27 October 2026) (born in 1924 according to his daughter ) was a South Sudanese military officer and politician. He belonged to the Madi ethnic group of Eastern Equatoria, in present-day South Sudan.

Lagu was a prominent leader of the southern Sudanese liberation movement during the First Sudanese Civil War. In 1963, he founded Anyanya, the military wing of the southern resistance movement, and later led the movement in its struggle against the Sudanese government. He played a key role in the peace process that culminated in the 1972 Addis Ababa Agreement, which ended the war and granted Southern Sudan regional autonomy.

He served as the second President of the High Executive Council of the Southern Sudan Autonomous Region from February 1978 to July 1979. In 1982, he was appointed Second Vice President of Sudan, a position he held until the overthrow of President Gaafar Nimeiry's government in 1985. Lagu subsequently served in diplomatic roles, including as Sudan's permanent representative to the United Nations from 1990 to 1992.

== Early life and education ==
Lagu was born on 21 November 1931, in a hamlet called Momokwe, in Moli, northern region of Madiland, about 80 miles south of Juba, Sudan. He belonged to the Madi people.

Lagu initially attended missionary schools; he was later accepted into the University of Khartoum to study law, but he instead enrolled in the Military College in Omdurman in 1958, graduating in May 1960. He was then commissioned as a second lieutenant in the Sudanese Army and was posted to Shendi with the 10th Brigade, Northern Command. Before his defection, Lagu was selected for the British Royal Military Academy Sandhurst, but declined.

== Civil war ==
In 1963, Lagu defected from the army and joined the disunited southern Sudanese resistance movement against the government of Sudan. That year, he became the leader of Anyanya, the military wing of the resistance movement, named after a deadly poison. Anyanya reinvigorated the movement that erupted on 18 August 1955 and continued the fight against the Sudanese government in the First Sudanese Civil War, which after the mutiny of 1955, really actively began in 1963.

In a 2011 interview with Agence France-Presse, Lagu recounted: "We started fighting for independence empty-handed", with "three rifles at the time". Anyanya received its first weapons shipment from the Congo. Later, Lagu sought support from Israel, who had recently defeated Egypt, which was supported by Sudan, during the Six-Day War. He wrote to Israel's prime minister and appealed for support by portraying the war as one between non-Arabs and pan-Arabists, marking the beginning of Israel–South Sudanese relations. His attempts succeeded, and Israel began providing arms and military training in 1969. By 1971, Lagu was able to unify the southern Sudanese resistance movements. Edgar O'Ballance credited this to Lagu's personality; however, Israeli military support also made the other resistance organizations dependent on him for weapons. Lagu renamed his organization the Southern Sudan Liberation Movement (SSLM) in the 1970s, although it was still informally known an Anyanya.

Among Lagu's junior officers in Anyanya was John Garang, who was recruited in 1970 and later became the chief architect of the second civil war.

== Peace process ==
Seeking to begin peace talks, Sudanese president Gaafar Nimeiry made contact with Lagu by October 1971, and by February 1972, a conference was set up between the SSLM and Nimeiry's government in Addis Ababa, Ethiopia. During the talks, the two sides disagreed on the status of Southern Sudan, with SSLM leaders demanding an independent state with its own army. However, Ethiopian emperor Haile Selassie mediated between the two sides, and despite opposition from SSLM leaders, Lagu went ahead with the talks. On 27 March, the Addis Ababa Agreement was signed, ending the war. The agreement granted regional autonomy to southern Sudan and ensured that Anyanya and its political arms would be absorbed into the national army, police force and the newly formed national government.

Following the agreement, Lagu rejoined the Sudanese armed forces with the rank of major general and oversaw the integration of rebel forces into the army. He was later appointed commander of the Southern Division, headquartered in Juba, and rose to the rank of lieutenant general. He retired from the military in 1978.

== Political career ==
After leaving military service, he was elected by popular vote to the Presidency of the High Executive Council of the Southern Sudan Autonomous Region in February 1978, and was succeeded on 12 July 1979 by Peter Gatkuoth, whom Lagu had appointed as his vice president. By 1980, Lagu felt that the Dinka, Southern Sudan's largest ethnic group, had unduly dominated the region's politics. He suggested splitting the south into the colonial-era provinces of Bahr el Ghazal, Upper Nile, and Equatoria in order to "decentralize" the region. His proposal earned Nimeiry's support, effectively ending the 1972 peace deal, as the Dinka believed that the government and the Equatorians were threatening the region's unity. In 1982, Lagu was appointed 2nd Vice President of Sudan by Nimeiry and was relocated to Khartoum.

In 1985 when Nimeiry's government was toppled by his defence minister, General Mohammed Ahmed Suar-El-Dahab, Lagu relocated to the United Kingdom. Under Prime Minister Sadiq al-Mahdi, he was appointed roving ambassador in 1989. After al-Mahdi's government was overthrown by Omar al-Bashir, Lagu's post as roving ambassador resumed. Lagu was appointed as Sudanese Ambassador to the United Nations between 1990 and 1992, and was then reappointed roving ambassador. He was appointed as a presidential advisor to al-Bashir in 1988, but declined the role. He was again offered the post of presidential advisor by al-Bashir after the signing of the Comprehensive Peace Agreement in 2005, but declined.

In the lead-up to the 2011 South Sudanese independence referendum, he was appointed a presidential advisor to President Salva Kiir. After completing this role, he retired from politics.

== Later life and death ==
In 2006 he completed writing his memoirs—Sudan Odyssey Through a State from Ruin to Hope. He had at least 10 children, including Josephine Lagu.

Joseph Lagu died in Juba on 27 October 2026, aged 94. South Sudanese President Salva Kiir declared a period of national mourning in his honour. On 5 November, Kiir posthumously promoted Lagu to full general. Lagu's state funeral, the first in South Sudan since its independence, took place on 13 November. A Requiem Mass was first held at the All Saints Episcopalian Cathedral of South Sudan in Mobil on 13 November, followed by Lagu's burial at Freedom Square in Juba, the site of Joseph Garang's grave. The date was declared a public holiday by the South Sudanese government.

Political offices
Preceded by Abel Alier	President of the High Executive Council of Southern Sudan; 1978–1979	Succeeded by Peter Gatkuoth
Preceded by Abel Alier	Second Vice President of Sudan; 1982–1985	Succeeded by George Kongor Arop
