= 2010 Southern Sudanese general election =

Regional election in Sudan

- 11–15 April 2010
- Registered: 4,539,835
- Presidential election
- Turnout: 61.98%
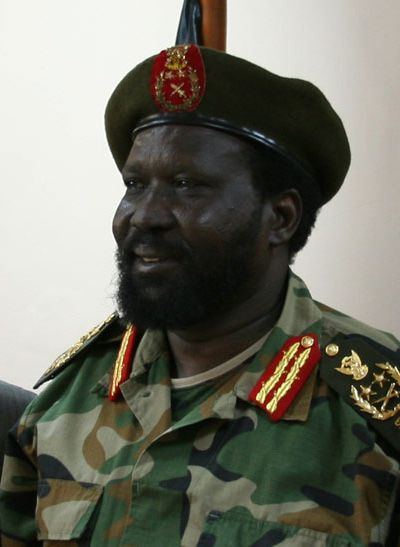

Candidate	Salva Kiir	Lam Akol
Party	SPLM	SPLM–DC
Popular vote	2,616,613	197,217
Percentage	92.99%	7.01%
- Results by region or municipality Kiir: 70-80% 80-90% 90%+
Elected President
Salva Kiir
SPLM
- Parliamentary election
- All 170 seats in the Legislative Assembly; 86 seats needed for a majority
Party	Seats
SPLM	161
SPLM–Democratic Change	1
National Congress	1
Independents	7
This lists parties that won seats. See the complete results below.

Regional elections were held in Southern Sudan between 11 and 15 April 2010 as part of the Sudanese general election. The result was a victory for Salva Kiir of the Sudan People's Liberation Movement, who received almost 93% of the vote. The winners of these elections would later continue in office upon South Sudan's independence after a referendum in 2011.

As of 2025, these are the last South Sudanese elections.

== Electoral system ==
The President was elected using the two-round system; if no candidate gained a majority of the vote in the first round, a run-off would have been held.

The 170 seats of the Legislative Assembly were elected by three methods:

- 102 seats (60%) were elected by First-past-the-post.
- 43 seats (25%) reserved for women were elected by closed list proportional representation with 4% electoral threshold.
- 25 seats (15%) unreserved were elected by the same system.

== Results ==
=== President ===
Candidate	Party	Votes	%
Salva Kiir	Sudan People's Liberation Movement	2,616,613	92.99
Lam Akol	Sudan People's Liberation Movement–Democratic Change	197,217	7.01
Total		2,813,830	100.00
Total votes		2,813,830	–
Registered voters/turnout		4,539,835	61.98
Source: National Electoral Commission

==== By state ====
Results by state.

	Salva Kiir SPLM		Lam Akol SPLM-DC		Margin		Total Votes
State	#	%	#	%	#	%	#
W. Bahr el Ghazal	137,070	90.51%	14,369	9.49%			151,439
Lakes	247,586	97.73%	5,740	2.27%			253,326
N. Bahr el Ghazal	256,208	97.10%	7,656	2.90%			263,864
Warrap	522,126	99.61%	2,046	0.39%			524,172
Unity	149,128	81.46%	33,932	18.54%			183,060
Jonglei	234,897	93.82%	15,486	6.18%			250,383
Upper Nile	199,296	74.75%	67,309	25.25%			266,605
C. Equatoria	227,151	89.29%	27,258	10.71%			254,409
E. Equatoria	487,090	98.02%	9,831	1.98%			496,921
W. Equatoria	156,061	91.99%	13,590	8.01%			169,651
Sources: National Electoral Commission

=== Legislative Assembly ===
Party	Votes	%	Seats
Sudan People's Liberation Movement			161
Sudan People's Liberation Movement–Democratic Change			1
National Congress Party			1
Independents			7
Total			170
Registered voters/turnout	4,539,835	–	
Source: National Electoral Commission

== See also ==
- 2010 Sudanese general election in Jonglei
- 2010 Sudanese gubernatorial elections
- 2010 Darfurian amalgamation referendum
- 2011 Southern Sudanese independence referendum
