= Santino Deng Teng =

Sudanese politician (born 1922)

Santino Deng Teng (born 1922) was a Sudanese politician. He was elected to the House of Representatives in 1953, and held ministerial posts between 1954 and 1964.

== Early life ==
Santino Deng Teng was born in 1922 at Makwan Kiir, belonging to the Dinka Paliet group in Aweil District. He was schooled at the Verona Father's Mission at Kwakjok Elementary School and St. Anthony's College in Bussere. He worked as an agriculturist and government officer in Lakes District, where he contributed to the formation of the Yirol Co-operative Society and was a member of the Yirol Council. He resigned from his government post in Lakes District to enter politics.

== Entry into politics ==
He was elected to the House of Representatives in the 1953 Sudanese parliamentary election, standing as an independent candidate in the Aweil East constituency. Soon after the election he joined the National Unionist Party. He was named Minister of State without Portfolio in the Ismail al-Azhari government in January 1954, promoted by Al-Azhari to Minister of Stores and Equipment in January 1955 following the cabinet crisis of December 1954. Per historian Robert O. Collins, he functioned as "a token southern minister and reliable sycophant in every government from 1954 to 1964".

== Military rule ==
Santino Deng Teng was re-elected to parliament in the 1958 Sudanese parliamentary election, after which he was named Minister of Animal Resources. He retained his post as Minister of Animal Resources in the cabinet of the Ibrahim Abboud military junta in November 1958. Santino Deng Teng was the sole Southerner to serve as Minister in the Abboud government. He remained in his ministerial post until the October 1964 revolution that ended Abboud rule.

== North-South conflict ==
At the time of the 1965 Round Table Conference between Northern and Southern leaders, Santino belonged to a minority group among the Southerners, the Other Shades of Opinion grouping (sponsored by Northern leaders) which favoured a decentralized Sudanese state rather than federalism. Soon thereafter became the founding president of the Sudan Unity Party. He set up a militia as self-defense against the Anyanya.

Santino lost his parliamentary seat in the 1968 Sudanese parliamentary election, and largely withdrew from politics and public life after 1972.
