= 1968 Sudanese parliamentary election =

- 12 April – 2 May 1968

All 218 seats in Parliament 110 seats needed for a majority
- Registered: 3,051,118
- Turnout: 1,862,901 (61.06%)
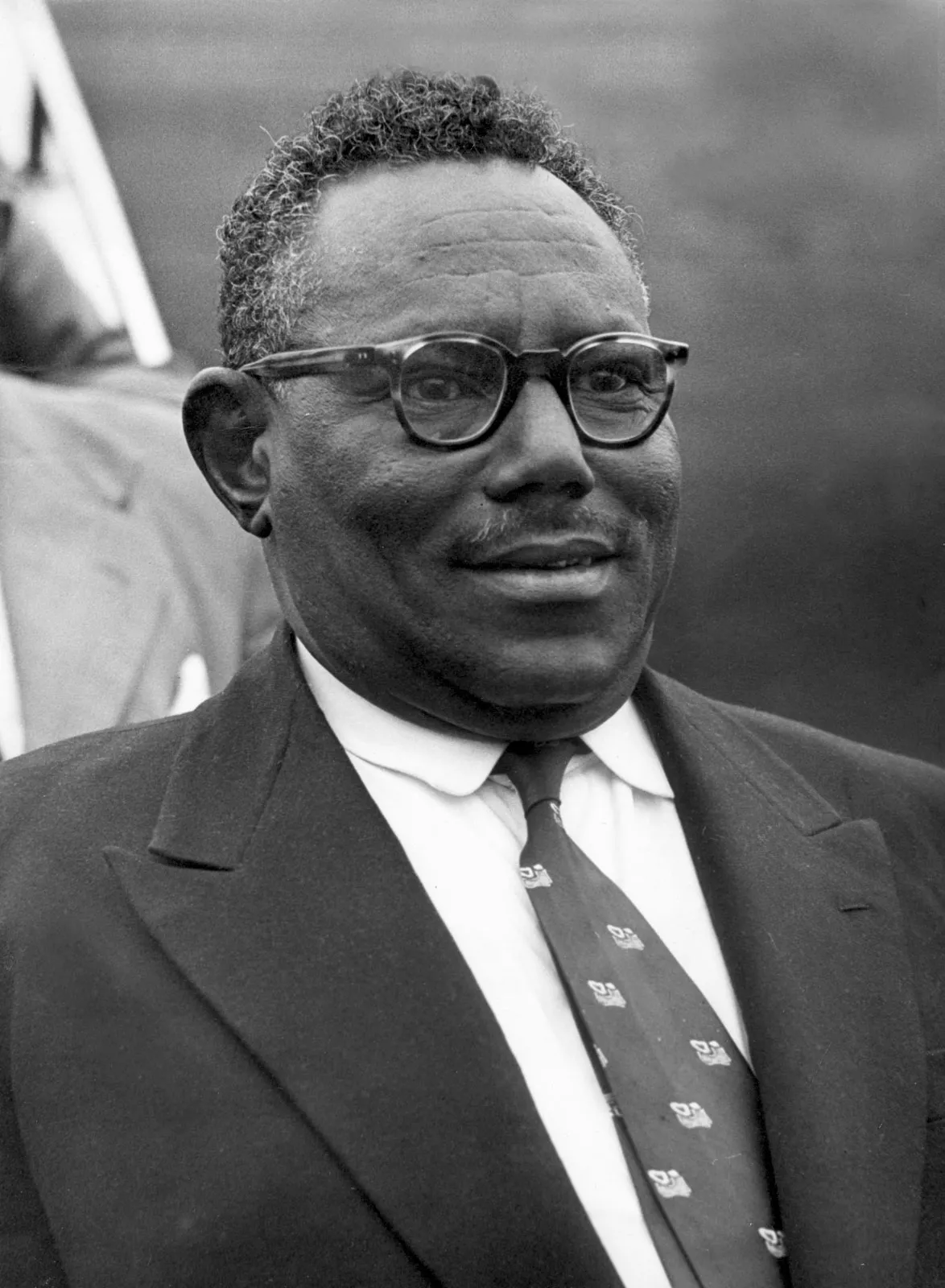

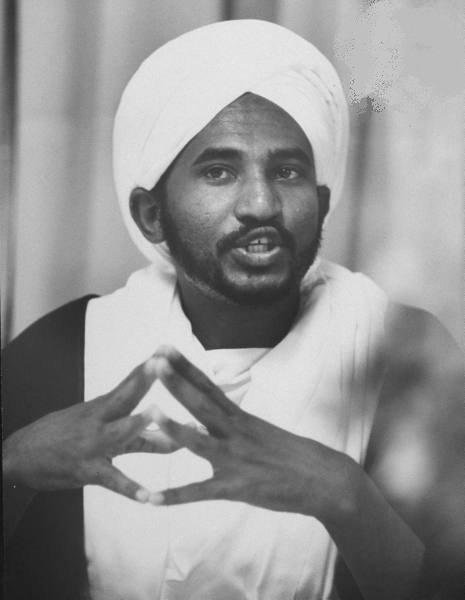

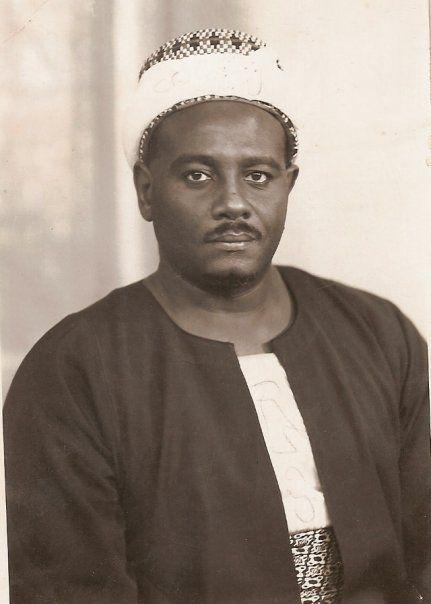
	First party	Second party	Third party
Leader	Ismail al-Azhari	Sadiq al-Mahdi	Imam al-Hadi al-Mahdi
Party	DUP	Umma–Sadiq	Umma–Imam
Last election	62	–	–
Seats won	101	36	30
Seat change	▲39	New	New
Popular vote	742,226	384,986	329,952
Percentage	40.79%	21.16%	18.13%
Prime Minister before election
Muhammad Ahmad Mahgoub
NUP
Elected Prime Minister
Muhammad Ahmad Mahgoub
NUP

Parliamentary elections were held in Sudan between 12 April and 2 May 1968. The election followed the resignation of a third of the members of the Assembly elected in 1965. The result was a victory for the new Democratic Unionist Party, formed by a merger of the National Unionist Party and the People's Democratic Party in December 1967 and led by President Ismail al-Azhari, which won 101 of the 218 seats. Voter turnout was 61.0%.

In contrast, since the last election the Umma Party had fractured, with competing wings being led by Sadiq al-Mahdi and Imam al-Hadi al-Mahdi. Whilst Sadiq's Umma party emerged as the stronger of the two wings, Sadiq actually lost his own seat in the election to a rival from the Imam wing. In total the various Umma party affiliates won some 827,289 votes, or 45.46% of the vote, compared to the 40.8% won by the DUP. The Umma affiliates won only 72 seats, in contrast to the 90 seats won at the previous election.

== Results ==
Party	Votes	%	Seats	+/–
Democratic Unionist Party	742,226	40.79	101	+39
Umma Party–Sadiq	384,986	21.16	36	New
Umma Party–Imam	329,952	18.13	30	New
Sudan African National Union	60,493	3.32	15	+5
Islamic Charter Front	44,552	2.45	3	–2
Umma Party	43,288	2.38	6	–86
Southern Front	39,822	2.19	10	New
Socialist Front	21,814	1.20	0	New
Socialists	19,690	1.08	0	New
Beja Congress	15,382	0.85	3	–7
National Unionist Party	10,159	0.56	0	New
Tenants' Union	6,661	0.37	0	New
Workers' Forces	5,204	0.29	1	New
Nuba Mountains Union	3,171	0.17	2	New
Sudanese Nile Party	2,704	0.15	1	New
Liberal	1,844	0.10	0	New
Islamic	1,772	0.10	0	New
Western Sudan Union	1,695	0.09	0	New
Sudanese Communist Party (Note: Although the Sudanese Communist Party had been banned in 1966, and could not formally participate in the election, two candidates were listed in the official election results as 'Communists'. The party's general secretary Abdel Khaliq Mahjub was elected from Omdurman South but listed by the Election Commission as having 'no political affiliation'.)	1,652	0.09	0	New
Democratic South	1,535	0.08	0	New
Unity	1,478	0.08	0	New
Workers' Federation	668	0.04	0	New
Peace	387	0.02	0	New
Socialist Democrats	220	0.01	0	New
National Unionist Party–Sadiq	63	0.00	0	New
Congress of New Forces	33	0.00	0	New
No political affiliation	8,264	0.45	1	New
Independents	70,047	3.85	9	–12
Total	1,819,762	100.00	218	+11
Valid votes	1,819,762	97.68		
Invalid/blank votes	43,139	2.32		
Total votes	1,862,901	100.00		
Registered voters/turnout	3,051,118	61.06		
Source: Nohlen et al.
