= Democratic Change (South Sudan) =

Political party in South Sudan

Democratic Change التغيير الديمقراطي
- Chairman: Lam Akol
- Secretary-general: Deng Bior
- Founded: June 2009
- Split from: Sudan People's Liberation Movement
- National Legislative Assembly: 4 / 550 (0.7%)

Website
- Official Democratic Change(DC) Website

Democratic Change (Arabic: التغيير الديمقراطي), also known as DC, formerly Sudan People's Liberation Movement–Democratic Change, is a political party in the Republic of South Sudan. It currently has 4 representatives in the National Legislative Assembly, South Sudan's Legislature, making it the second largest party in South Sudan after the SPLM.

The party was founded in June 2009 by Lam Akol to compete in the Sudanese general election, 2010 and act as an alternative to the ruling SPLM.

On 6 January 2016, the party's National Council (NC) resolved to change the name of the Party to become the “Democratic Change” (DC), and recommended the new name to the National Delegates Congress for adoption.

== See also ==
- Sudan People's Liberation Movement
- Sudan People's Liberation Movement-North
- SPLA-Nasir
