= Southern Sudan Autonomous Region (1972–1983) =

Former autonomous region of Sudan

- Autonomous region of Sudan
- 1972–1983
- Map showing Southern Sudan (red) within Sudan (darker brown).
- Capital: Juba
- Area
  - 1983: 619,745 km^{2} (239,285 sq mi)
- Population
  - 1983: 5,466,700
- Government
  - Type: Autonomous region
- President of the High Executive Council
  - 1972–1978 (first): Abel Alier
  - 1982–1983 (last): Joseph James Tombura
- Legislature: People's Regional Assembly
- History
  - Addis Ababa Agreement: 28 February 1972
  - Autonomy abolished: 5 June 1983
Preceded by	Succeeded by
Democratic Republic of Sudan	Democratic Republic of Sudan
- Today part of: South Sudan

The Southern Sudan Autonomous Region was an autonomous region that existed in southern Sudan between 1972 and 1983. It was established on 28 February 1972 by the Addis Ababa Agreement which ended the First Sudanese Civil War. The region was abolished on 5 June 1983 by the administration of Sudanese President Gaafar Nimeiry. Revocation of southern autonomy was one of the causes of the Second Sudanese Civil War which would continue until January 2005, when southern autonomy was restored; the region became the independent Republic of South Sudan in 2011.

== Government and politics ==
The autonomous region consisted of the three provinces of Equatoria, Bahr al-Ghazal, and Greater Upper Nile. Juba was the regional capital.

=== Executive ===
Southern Sudan was governed by the High Executive Council which was led by a President of the High Executive Council. Abel Alier was the first President, holding that post between 1972 and 1978.

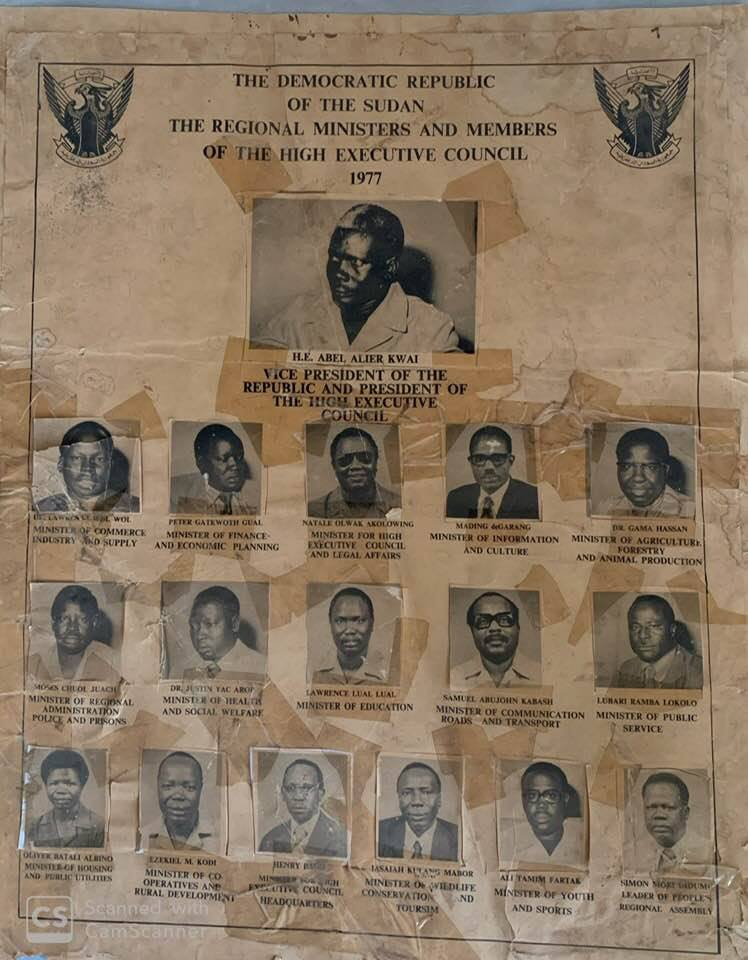
Regional ministers & members of the High Executive Council (1977)

President of the High Executive Council
No.	Portrait	Name (Birth–Death)	Term of office			Political party	Elected
No.	Portrait	Name (Birth–Death)	Took office	Left office	Time in office	Political party	Elected
1	Abel Alier	Abel Alier (born 1933)	6 April 1972	February 1978	5 years, 301 days	SF	–
2	Joseph Lagu	Joseph Lagu (1931–2026)	February 1978	12 July 1979	1 year, 161 days	SANU	–
3	Peter Gatkuoth	Peter Gatkuoth (1938–2010)	12 July 1979	30 May 1980	323 days	Independent	–
(1)	Abel Alier	Abel Alier (born 1933)	30 May 1980	5 October 1981	1 year, 128 days	SF	–
4	Gismalla Abdalla Rassas	Gismalla Abdalla Rassas (1932–2013)	5 October 1981	23 June 1982	261 days	Independent	–
5	Joseph James Tombura	Joseph James Tombura (1929–1992)	23 June 1982	5 June 1983	347 days	SANU	–

=== Legislature ===
Legislative authority was vested in the People's Regional Assembly.

Speakers

Name	Took office	Left office	Notes
Lubari Ramba	15 December 1973	15 December 1975	Speaker People's Regional Assembly
Hilary Logali	December 1975	December 1977	Speaker People's Regional Assembly
Uncle Clement Mboro	July 1978	18 July 1979	Speaker People's Regional Assembly
Isaiah Kulang	18 July 1979	4 February 1980	Speaker People's Regional Assembly
Angelo Beda	30 May 1980	5 June 1981	Speaker People's Regional Assembly
Mathew Obur	23 June 1982	1983	Speaker People's Regional Assembly

== Post-abolition ==
The Southern Sudan Autonomous Region was abolished in 1983. Between 1987 and 1989 the Council for the South existed in Southern Sudan. Following the signing of the Khartoum Peace Agreement of 1997, the Southern Sudan Coordination Council was established initially led by Riek Machar who was also appointed Assistant to the President of the Republic. This body was abolished in 2005 when the Autonomous Government of Southern Sudan was established.

== See also ==
- South Sudan
- Comprehensive Peace Agreement
- Southern Sudan Autonomous Region (2005–2011), the autonomous region that existed between 2005 and independence in 2011
- 2011 South Sudanese independence referendum
