= Abel Alier =

South Sudanese politician and judge (born 1933)

Abel Alier Kwai
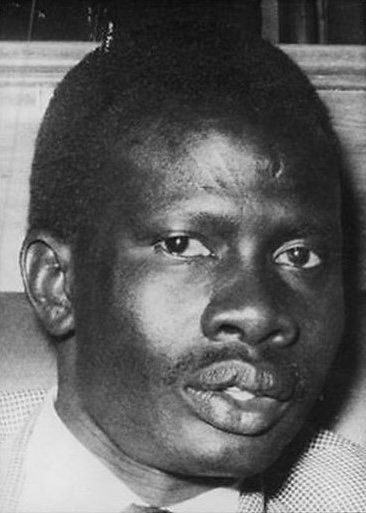

First Vice President of Sudan
- In office 1971–1972
- President: Gaafar Nimeiry
- Preceded by: Babiker Awadalla
- Succeeded by: Mohamed Al-Baghir Ahmed

Second Vice President of Sudan
- In office 1972–1982
- Preceded by: Khalid Hassan Abbas
- Succeeded by: Joseph Lagu

President of the High Executive Council of the Southern Sudan Autonomous Region
- In office 6 April 1972 – February 1978
- Preceded by: Position established
- Succeeded by: Joseph Lagu

Personal details
- Born: June 23, 1933 (age 93) Bor District, Upper Nile, Anglo-Egyptian Sudan (now South Sudan)
- Education: University of Khartoum
- Occupation: Lawyer
- Profession: Judge
- Ethnicity: Dinka

Abel Alier Kwai (born 23 June 1933) is a South Sudanese politician and former judge who served as First Vice President of Sudan between 1971 and 1982 and as President of the High Executive Council of the Southern Sudan Autonomous Region between 1972 and 1978. Abel Alier was a politician who managed to complete his college education among many Southern Sudanese. He is an internationally respected judge, human-rights lawyer and activist on behalf of Christians in the Sudan. Former Vice President of Sudan (1971–1982), he served as the first president of the High Executive Council of Southern Sudan. He sits on the Permanent Court of International Arbitration in The Hague and is recognized as Sudan's most prominent Christian lawyer. His latest book is Southern Sudan: Too Many Agreements Dishonoured.

== Early years ==
Alier was born in June 1933 in the Bor District of the Upper Nile State in Anglo-Egyptian Sudan (now within South Sudan). He attended the renowned Rumbek Secondary School, which educated many South Sudanese leaders. He also attended the Wad Saina School in northern Sudan. He graduated from Law School of University of Khartoum and had his own law firm prior to his appointment as magistrate, becoming the first Sudanese judge of southern origin. He was active in the Southern Front since its foundation in 1964 and was in of its representatives at the Round Table Conference in 1965. He was elected to the National Parliament from 1968 to 1969 for Bor South constituency. He subsequently held several ministerial positions in the Sudanese government.

== Addis Ababa Agreement of 1972 ==
Abel Alier was instrumental in the creation of the 1972 Addis Ababa Agreement which permitted southern Sudan to have its own autonomous government based out of Juba. Alier became a Vice President of Sudan under Gaafar Nimeiry.

In 2005 he headed the committee that was appointed to investigate the death of John Garang who had died in a helicopter crash after leaving Uganda for Sudan. Alier and his team did their part to investigate the possible mechanical failure that led to the crash which had been blamed on bad weather and lack of visibility although the Ugandan President Yoweri Museveni hinted that the possibility of foul play was something that shouldn't be dismissed or disregarded.

== Sudan peace deals ==
In the early 1990s, Abel Alier wrote a book under the title Southern Sudan: Too Many Agreements Dishonored. The agreement signed in Imperial Ethiopia in 1972 was dishonoured by Nimeiry in 1983 when he announced the introduction of Islamic Law.

In early 1997, Dr. Riek Machar, signed an agreement with Khartoum, referred to as "The Khartoum Agreement". It was never implemented. Alier's book was about such agreements and the failure to implement them. The recent peace deal between the south and north of Sudan is known as "The Comprehensive Peace Agreement" (CPA). This is the agreement that was signed by John Garang before his death on July 30 2005. The international community including the United States, the United Kingdom, the EU and the United Nations along with the African IGAD have supported this agreement.

Political offices
Preceded by Babiker Awadalla	First Vice President of Sudan; 1971–1972	Succeeded by Mohamed al-Baghir Ahmed
Preceded by Khalid Hassan Abbas	Second Vice President of Sudan; 1972–1982	Succeeded by Joseph Lagu
