= Southern Front (Sudan) =

Sudanese political party

The Southern Front was a Sudanese political party, from the ranks of which came the first President of the High Executive Council of the Southern Sudan Autonomous Region, Abel Alier, the first head of the autonomous government of that then Sudanese region, in 1972.

Between 1965 and 1969, the Southern Front published The Vigilant, an English language newsletter as the mouthpiece of the Southern movement.
