= Abdel Halim Mohamed =

Sudanese physician and politician (1910-2009)

Dr Abdel Halim Mohamed FRCP
- عبد الحليم محمد
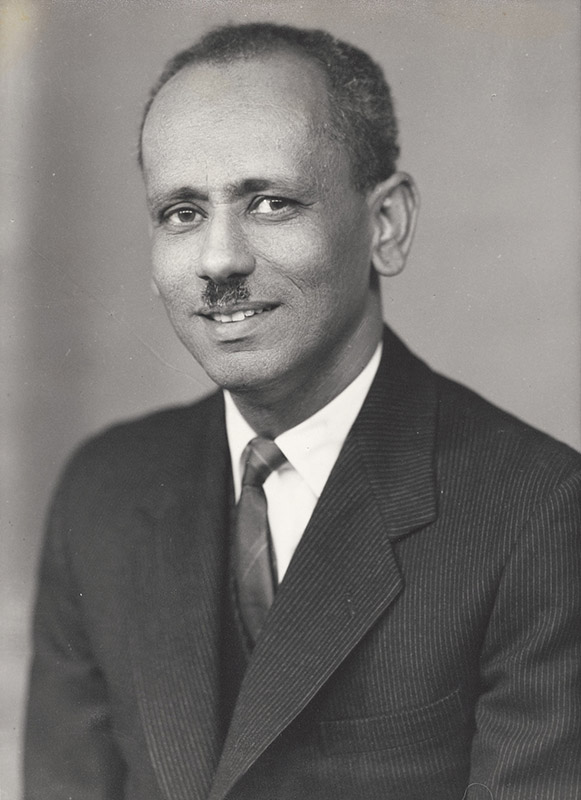
- Mohamed in 1962

President of CAF Acting
- In office 18 August 1987 – 10 March 1988
- Preceded by: Yidnekatchew Tessema
- Succeeded by: Issa Hayatou

3rd President of CAF
- In office 1968–1972
- Preceded by: Abdel Aziz Moustafa
- Succeeded by: Yidnekatchew Tessema

Member of the Third Sovereignty Council
- In office 10 June 1965 – 8 July 1965
- Prime Minister: Muhammad Ahmad Mahgoub
- Preceded by: Ismail al-Azhari
- Succeeded by: Jaafar Nimeiry

Member of the Second Sovereignty Council
- In office 3 December 1964 – 10 June 1965
- Prime Minister: Sirr Al-Khatim Al-Khalifa
- Preceded by: Ibrahim Abboud
- Succeeded by: Ismail al-Azhari

Mayor of Khartoum
- In office 1956–1960

Personal details
- Born: Abdel-Halim Mohamed Abdel-Halim Musaad Hashim; 10 April 1910 Omdurman, Anglo-Egyptian Sudan
- Died: 16 April 2009 (aged 99) Khartoum, Sudan
- Party: National Umma Party; Graduates' General Congress
- Spouse: Khalda Ahmed Khalil
- Education: Omdurman Primary School; Gordon Memorial College; Kitchener School of Medicine (DKSM); University of Khartoum (MD)
- Occupation: Physician; Civil Servant; Writer; Political activist
- Awards: Order of the Righteous Son of Sudan; Olympic Order (Silver); Honorary life president of CAF; Honorary life member of the IOC; FIFA Order of Merit
- Employer(s): University of Khartoum ‘Al Fajr’ magazine Sudan Football Association; Confederation of African Football; FIFA

Abdel Halim Mohamed Abdel Halim (Arabic: عبد الحليم محمد عبد الحليم; 10 April 1910 – 16 April 2009) was a Sudanese physician, writer, political activist, civil servant, and sports administrator who received national and international accolades for his work. He was born into a family of scholars, writers and politicians: his grandfather was a Mahdist prince and military leader. Abdel Halim became a doctor, graduating from Kitchener School of Medicine and training in Khartoum and London. Due to his contributions, he is remembered as the "Father of medicine in Sudan". He was among the first Sudanese to become a senior physician and a Fellow of the Royal College of Physicians.

Abdel Halim was one of the founders of the Graduates' General Congress demanding independence from the Anglo-Egyptian occupation. After independence, he was the mayor of Khartoum until 1960 and later a member of the Sudanese Sovereignty Council (1964–1965). He was nicknamed the 'wise Sheikh' due to his political impartiality.

He was one of the founders of the Confederation of African Football and the president of the Sudan Football Association, Sudan Equestrian Association, Sudan Olympic Committee and Sudanese Basketball Association. He served as the third president of the Confederation of African Football from 1968 to 1972 and from 1987 to 1988. He objected to South Africa and Rhodesia sport-segregation policies and refused to allow their teams to play unless it was mixed.

== Early life ==
Abdel Halim Mohamed Abdel Halim Musaad Hashim was born in Omdurman, Anglo-Egyptian Sudan, on 10 April 1910 into the ‘Hashmab’ family, a family of scholars, writers and politicians with a pedigree equal to many of the gentry. Abdel Halim was named after his grandfather, a Mahdist prince and military leader. His grandfather had played a decisive role in the defeat of an Egyptian army led by William Hicks at the battle of Shaykan in 1883 and the siege of Khartoum in 1885, before his death at the Battle of Toski on 3 August 1889.

Abdel Halim grew up with Chronic obstructive pulmonary disease, which led to the failure of one of his lungs in his youth.

== Education ==
Abdel Halim began his education at a Quranic school (Khalwa) before entering Omdurman Primary School. He then attended Gordon Memorial College (known today as the University of Khartoum) in 1924, studying accountancy, before attending Kitchener School of Medicine (today the Faculty of Medicine at the University of Khartoum) (1929–1933) and graduated at the top of his class with a Diploma of Kitchener School of Medicine (DKSM).

Abdel Halim started his medical training as a house physician at Khartoum Teaching Hospital (1933–1934) and then as a medical registrar (1935–1938). He then continued his training in medicine and cardiology at Hammersmith Hospital, London, in 1939. Due to the Second World War, he had to return to the Khartoum Teaching Hospital to work as an assistant to the senior physician. Still, after the war, he returned to the United Kingdom to finish his medicine and cardiology training.

== Medical career ==
Abdel Halim became the first Sudanese director of Omdurman Teaching Hospital (1950) and Khartoum Teaching Hospital (1954–1964). He was appointed senior physician to the Ministry of Health in 1953. He expanded these hospitals to include respiratory, cardio, neurology, neurosurgery and dermatology services and organised the building of the Al Shaab Teaching Hospital. After Sudan's independence, he also taught at the Kitchener School of Medicine and Faculty of Medicine, University of Khartoum.

Abdel Halim was a council member of the Gordon Memorial College from 1952 before becoming the first Sudanese chairman of the University Khartoum council after Sudan became independent in 1956. He held the position until he retired from medical duties in 1965.

Abdel Halim was the founding president of the Sudanese Medical Association (1949–1965). He was one of the first Sudanese physicians to become a member of the Royal College of Physicians in 1948, and to be elected a Fellow (FRCP) in 1962. In 1965, Abdel Halim received an honorary Doctor of Medicine (MD) from the University of Khartoum.

=== Medical legacy ===
In the past, when investigative techniques were crude, Abdel Halim was described as "a superb medical diagnostician and an inspiring instructor. His medical ward rounds provided a platform for rigorous medical instruction, poetry, high-flying prose, Sudanese proverbs, and Qur'anic verses, in flawless classical Arabic and perfect English; everything was communicated with style and humour." Abdel Halim is remembered as the ‘Father of medicine in Sudan’.

== Literary and political activism ==
=== Al Fajr ===
With his cousin, Muhammad Ahmad Mahgoub, Abdel Halim founded the ‘Hashmab society’, which advocated for education and enlightenment in Sudan. At the end of the 1920s, the society evolved to become ‘Al Fajr’ (the Dawn, Arabic: الفجر ) society which established its magazine in 1934 that was committed to Sudanese folklore, culture and nationalist movements. Abdel Halim regularly contributed to Al Fajr magazine under a pen name. A book written by Muhammad Ahmad Mahgoub and Abdel Halim, titled "Death of a world" (Arabic: موت دنيا ), advocated personal sacrifice for the national cause. They wrote in its introduction:

تجمّع رأينا على إصدار مجلة نصف شهرية تخدم الآداب والفنون، واخترنا لها اسم 'الفجر'، ذلك لأننا مؤمنون بأنه فجر صادق سرعان ما يتلوه الصبح... ومضينا لا يفلّ النقد عزمنا ولا يغرينا الثناء.
وأخذت كبريات الصحف المصرية تنقل عن مجلّتنا المقالات الأدبية والقصص... لقد كانت حرباً عاتية بين الرجعية الفكرية والفكر الحر... وما صدر عدد من أعداد 'الفجر' إلّا وأعقبته ضجّة في دُور الحكومة وفي المجتمع، فالحكومة غير راضية عن اتّجاهاتنا، ضائقة ذرعاً بما نوجّهه من نقد سياساتها، والمجتمع شاك في أمرنا لأنه لم يتعوّد مثل تلك الصراحة في النقد ومجابهة الحاكمين

Our opinion gathered on issuing a fortnightly magazine that serves literature and the arts, and we chose for it the name 'Al-Fajr' because we believe that it is an honest dawn that will soon be followed by the morning...and we keep walking, neither criticism faltered our resolve, nor tempted us with praise.

Major Egyptian newspapers began to quote literary articles and stories from our magazine... It was a fierce war between intellectual reaction and free thought... and when an issue of 'Dawn' was published, it was followed by an uproar in the government and society. The government is not satisfied with our directions, fed up with our criticism of its policies, and society is suspicious of us because it is not accustomed to such frankness in criticism and confrontation with the rulers

— Muhammad Ahmad Mahgoub and Abdel Halim, Death of a world (Arabic: موت دنيا)

=== Before and after Sudan's independence ===
Abdel Halim was among the founders of the Graduates' General Congress in 1938 that later drafted the first memorandum in 1942, demanding independence from the Anglo-Egyptian occupation. Abdel Halim was the political adviser and confidant to Abd al-Rahman al-Mahdi, one of the leading religious and political figures during the colonial era in Anglo-Egyptian Sudan.

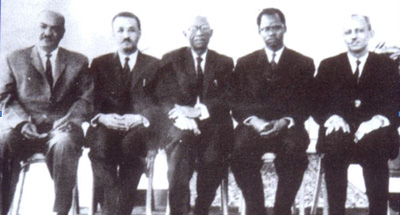
The second Sudanese Sovereignty Council (3 December 1964–10 June 1965). From left to right: Tigani El Mahi, Mubarak Shadad, Ibrahim Yusuf Sulayman, Luigi Adwok Bong Gicomeho and Abdel Halim Mohamed.

In 1956 and after Sudan's independence, Abdel Halim became the Khartoum District Council's president and mayor of Khartoum until 1960. After the overthrow of General Ibrahim Abboud's in 1964, Abdel Halim served as a member of the second and third Sudanese Sovereignty Council, from 3 December 1964 to 8 July 1965, which presided over the interim coalition Government that paved the way for general elections. He was the head of state from 1 April 1965 to 30 April 1965.

=== Political legacy ===
Fadwa Abdel Rahman Ali Taha, the Sudanese historian and scholar, emphasised that, after Sudan's independence, Abdel Halim felt that much could have been achieved if the Graduates' General Congress movement had stayed on course and not been overwhelmed by the intense division between political parties. The Sudanese historian and scholar Mansour Khalid nicknamed Abdel Halim the 'wise Sheikh'. Abdel Halim received the Order of the Righteous Son of Sudan.

== Sports administration ==
Abdel Halim was the president of the Sudan Football Association (1953), the Sudan Basketball Association (1960), the Sudan Equestrian Association, and the Sudan Olympic Committee (1956–1958 and 1964–1970). He was a member of the International Olympic Committee from 1968 until 1982.

=== CAF and FIFA ===
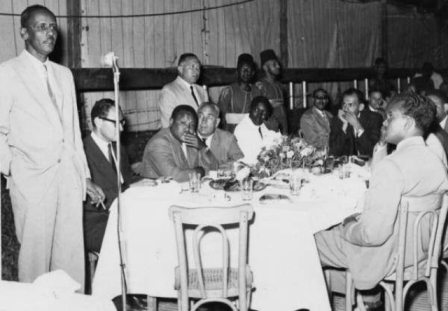
Abdel Halim speaking during the CAF meeting in 1959 held in the United Arab Republic (Egypt) before the 1959 African Cup of Nations

Abdel Halim was behind the idea of forming an African football association. He was one of the founders of the Confederation of African Football (CAF), which was established on 8 February 1957 at the Grand Hotel in Khartoum, Sudan by the national football associations of Egypt, Ethiopia, South Africa and Sudan. This meeting followed the formal discussions between the aforementioned associations at the FIFA Congress, held on 7 June 1956 at Avenida Hotel in Lisbon, Portugal.

Abdel Halim served as the third president of the CAF from 1968 to 1972. Upon Yidnekatchew Tessema's sudden illness and death on 19 August 1987, Abdel Halim served as the (fifth) president of the CAF until 10 March 1988, when the general assembly was held in Casablanca, and Issa Hayatou was elected president of CAF.

Abdel Halim was the first African to be elected as a member of the executive council of the International Association of Football Federation (FIFA) (1958–1962). He later became the head of the medical department of FIFA in 1966.

=== Sports activism ===
In 1970, during Abdel Halim tenure as CAF president, CAF voted to suspend Rhodesia's (modern-day Zimbabwe) FIFA membership due to their sports segregation policies. This came years after the CAF expelled the Rhodesia Football Association, only four days after the country's unilateral declaration of independence on 11 November 1965. The CAF was again the first International sports institution to expel Apartheid South Africa in 1957, before the first African Cup of Nations, in Sudan, promoting further tension with FIFA, which accused the CAF of "mixing sport with politics." Also during his tenure, African nations were included in the 1970 FIFA World Cup, after 36 years of absence since Egypt's participation in the 1934 FIFA World Cup.

Abdel Halim was part of African boycott of the 1976 Summer Olympics, which was in Montreal because the International Olympic Committee (IOC) refused to ban New Zealand after the New Zealand national rugby union team had toured apartheid South Africa earlier in 1976 in defiance of the United Nations' calls for a sporting embargo. He also supported the boycott of the 1980 Summer Olympics, in Moscow, as a protest against the Soviet Union's invasion of Afghanistan.

=== Sporting legacy ===
Abdel Halim objected to South African and Rhodesian sports segregation policies and refused to allow their teams to play unless it was mixed. According to Sudanese sports historian El-Keer el-Moutasim, Abdel Halim took out a loan on his own house to fund the 1970 African Cup of Nations in Sudan when official funding was delayed.

Abdel Halim received the Olympic Order (Silver) in 1983, and was made an honorary life member of the International Olympic Committee in 1989, and honorary life president of CAF. In 1994, he received the FIFA Order of Merit. However, according to the Sudanese football journalist Muzammil Abu Al-Qasim, due to personal disputes with Kamal Shaddad, President of the Sudan Football Association (SFA) (1988-2010, 2017-2021), Abdel Halim was not honoured during his life or posthumously by SFA.

However, upon his death on 16 April 2009, the SFA lowered its flag for three days to symbolise mourning and a minute of silence was observed before football matches during these three days. Sepp Blatter, president of FIFA, paid tribute to Abdel Halim, stating that:

In the name of the international football community, we would like to pass on our sincerest condolences to the people of Africa, particularly the family and close friends of Dr Abdel Halim Mohamed. He will be sorely missed for his great intellect, determination and dedication by those whose lives he touched, whether on a personal level or as a result of the prodigious contribution he made within CAF during its emergence after 1956.

== Personal life and death ==
Abdel Halim married Khalda Ahmed Khalil in 1942, who died in 1987. They had two daughters and five sons. Abdel Halim died in Khartoum on 16 April 2009. Following the Death of Former Acting Prime Minister of Cambodia on 22 January 2009 until his own death he was the world's oldest living former State leaders, and Following the Death of Former President of Somalia Aden Adde until his own death he was Africa's oldest living former state leader.
