= List of heads of state of Sudan =

President of the Transitional Sovereignty Council of the Republic of the Sudan
- رئيس مجلس السيادة الانتقالي لجمهورية السودان (Arabic)
- Emblem of Sudan

- Presidential Standard

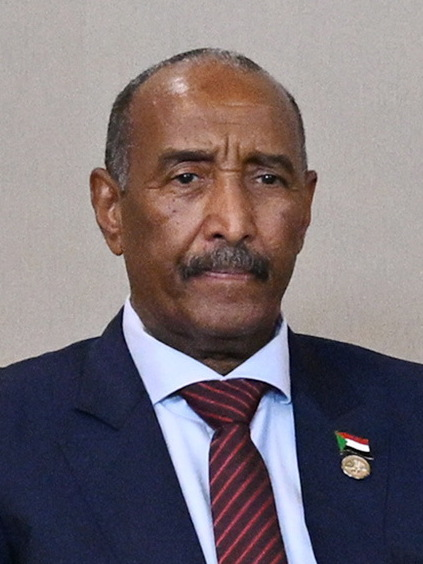
- Incumbent; Abdel Fattah al-Burhan; President of the Transitional Sovereignty Council since 11 November 2021
- Executive branch of the Sudanese Government; Head of state of the Republic of the Sudan
- Type: Head of state Commander-in-chief
- Residence: Republican Palace, Khartoum
- Seat: Khartoum
- Formation: 26 December 1955; 70 years ago
- First holder: Five-member Sovereignty Council (collective presidency)
- Salary: US$29,320 annually
- Website: www.presidency.gov.sd/eng/

This article lists the heads of state of Sudan since the establishment of the First Sovereignty Council in 1955, prior to the country's independence.

== History of the office ==
Since independence was proclaimed on 1 January 1956, six individuals (and three multi-member sovereignty councils) have served as head of state of Sudan, currently under the title President of the Republic of Sudan. Prior to independence, Sudan was governed as a condominium by Egypt and the United Kingdom, under the name Anglo-Egyptian Sudan. As such, executive power was vested in a dyarchy consisting of both countries' heads of state – at the time of independence, the Queen of the United Kingdom (Elizabeth II) and the Egyptian Revolutionary Command Council (headed by Gamal Abdel Nasser). Immediately following independence, the role of head of state was filled by a five-member Sovereignty Council, with rival nationalist factions unable to agree on a single candidate. In November 1958, General Ibrahim Abboud led a military coup d'état, assuming the role of head of state as Chairman of the Supreme Council. Assuming the title of president in 1964, he resigned later that year due to general discontent around the rule of the military regime. Abboud was succeeded by a senior civil servant, Sirr Al-Khatim Al-Khalifa, who served as acting president for 18 days before transferring executive authority to a Committee of Sovereignty.

Ismail al-Azhari, the leader of the National Unionist Party, was made president in July 1965; he ruled with limited power until he was deposed in a 1969 military coup. The military officers responsible for the coup established the National Revolutionary Command Council, chaired by Jaafar Nimeiry. Nimeiry, the leader of the newly formed Sudanese Socialist Union, assumed the position of president in 1971, and subsequently established a one-party state, which existed until 1985, when a group of military officers overthrew his government and established the 1985 Transitional Military Council, led by Field Marshal Abdel Rahman Swar al-Dahab. Ahmed al-Mirghani succeeded to the relatively powerless position of Chairman of the Supreme Council in 1986, after multi-party election held that year. He was deposed in a 1989 military coup led by Lieutenant-General Omar al-Bashir. Al-Bashir served as head of state, under the title of Chairman of the Revolutionary Command Council for National Salvation from 1989 to 1993 and as president from 1993 to 2019 (and from 1996 as the leader of the National Congress Party).

Al-Bashir was removed from power by the Sudanese Armed Forces on 11 April 2019, amid the Sudanese revolution after holding the office for nearly 30 years. Lieutenant-General Ahmed Awad Ibn Auf took control of Sudan without becoming head of state, established the 2019 Transitional Military Council, but resigned the following day in favor of Lieutenant-General Abdel Fattah al-Burhan. The Transitional Military Council was replaced with the Transitional Sovereignty Council on 21 August 2019, under the chairmanship of al-Burhan. The Sovereignty Council, an 11-member civilian-military collective head of state, is designed to lead the country for 39 months in the transition to democracy, which is supposed to end with the next general election. The Transitional Sovereignty Council was dissolved by al-Burhan on 25 October 2021, following a coup d'état. Al-Burhan reinstated it on 11 November 2021, with some members replaced.

== Term limits ==
As of 2021, there is a two-term limit for the president in the Constitution of Sudan. The term limit has not been met by any president yet.

== Titles of heads of state ==
- 1955–1958: Sovereignty Council
- 1958–1964: Chairman of the Supreme Council
- 1964: President
- 1964–1965: Sovereignty Council
- 1965–1969: Chairman of the Sovereignty Council
- 1969–1971: Chairman of the National Revolutionary Command Council
- 1971: President of the Revolutionary Council
- 1971: Chairman of the National Revolutionary Command Council
- 1971–1985: President
- 1985: Commander-in-Chief
- 1985–1986: Chairman of the Transitional Military Council
- 1986–1989: Chairman of the Supreme Council
- 1989–1993: Chairman of the Revolutionary Command Council for National Salvation
- 1993–2019: President
- 2019: President/Chairman of the Transitional Military Council
- 2019–2021: Transitional Sovereignty Council
  - 2019–2021: President/Chairman of the Transitional Sovereignty Council
- 2021: Commander-in-Chief of the Armed Forces
- 2021–present: Transitional Sovereignty Council
  - 2021–present: President/Chairman of the Transitional Sovereignty Council

== Heads of state of Sudan ==
(Dates in italics indicate de facto continuation of office)

No.	Portrait	Name (Birth–Death)	Elected	Term of office			Political party
No.	Portrait	Name (Birth–Death)	Elected	Took office	Left office	Time in office	Political party
=== Republic of the Sudan (1956–1969) ===
1		First Sovereignty Council (Note: Members: Abdel Fattah al-Maghrabi, Ahmed Mohammed Yassin, Ahmad Muhammad Salih, Dardiri Mohammed Osman and Siricio Iro Wani.)	—	26 December 1955	17 November 1958 (Deposed)	2 years, 326 days	Independent
2		Ibrahim Abboud (1900–1983)	—	17 November 1958	16 November 1964 (Resigned)	5 years, 365 days	Military
—		Sirr Al-Khatim Al-Khalifa (1919–2006); Acting President	—	16 November 1964	3 December 1964	17 days	National Umma Party
3		Second Sovereignty Council (Note: Members: Abdel Halim Mohamed, El-Tigani el-Mahi, Mubarak Shaddad, Ibrahim Yusuf Sulayman and Luigi Adwok.)	—	3 December 1964	10 June 1965	189 days	Independent
4		Third Sovereignty Council (Note: Members: Ismail al-Azhari, Abdallah al-Fadil al-Mahdi, Luigi Adwok, Abdel Halim Mohamed and Khader Hamad.)	—	10 June 1965	25 May 1969 (Deposed)	3 years, 349 days	Independent
5		Ismail al-Azhari (1900–1969) (Note: Co-leading with the Third Sovereignty Council.)	—	10 June 1965	25 May 1969 (Deposed)	3 years, 349 days	Democratic Unionist Party
=== Democratic Republic of the Sudan (1969–1985) ===
6		Gaafar Nimeiry (1930–2009)	–	25 May 1969	19 July 1971 (Deposed)	2 years, 55 days	Military / Sudanese Socialist Union
7		Babiker al-Nur Osman (1935–1971)	—	19 July 1971	22 July 1971	3 days	Military / Sudanese Communist Party
(6)		Gaafar Nimeiry (1930–2009)	1971 (Note: Presidency referendum.); 1977; 1983	22 July 1971 (Restored)	6 April 1985 (Deposed)	13 years, 258 days	Military / Sudanese Socialist Union
=== Republic of the Sudan (1985–2019) ===
8		Abdel Rahman Swar al-Dahab (1934–2018)	—	6 April 1985	6 May 1986 (Note: Handed over power to the civilian government after the 1986 parliamentary election.)	1 year, 30 days	Military
9		Ahmed al-Mirghani (1941–2008)	—	6 May 1986	30 June 1989 (Deposed)	3 years, 55 days	Democratic Unionist Party
10		Omar al-Bashir (born 1944)	1996; 2000; 2010; 2015	30 June 1989	11 April 2019 (Deposed)	29 years, 285 days	Military / Independent / National Congress Party
=== Transitional period (2019–present) ===
11		Ahmed Awad Ibn Auf (born c. 1956)	—	11 April 2019	12 April 2019 (Resigned)	1 day	Military / National Congress Party
12		Abdel Fattah al-Burhan (born 1960)	—	12 April 2019	21 August 2019	7 years, 170 days	Military
12		Abdel Fattah al-Burhan (born 1960)	TSC Chairman (Note: Serving with Mohamed Hamdan Dagalo, Yasser al-Atta, Shams al-Din Kabbashi, Ibrahim Jaber, Aisha Musa el-Said, Siddiq Tawer, Mohamed al-Faki, Hassan Sheikh Idris, Mohammed Hassan al-Ta'ishi and Raja Nicola.)	21 August 2019	25 October 2021	7 years, 170 days	Military / FFC / TMC
12		Abdel Fattah al-Burhan (born 1960)	—	25 October 2021	11 November 2021	7 years, 170 days	Military
12		Abdel Fattah al-Burhan (born 1960)	TSC Chairman (Note: Serving with Deputy Chairman Mohamed Hamdan Dagalo (until 2023), Malik Agar (Deputy Chairman from 2023), Shams al-Din Kabbashi, Yasser al-Atta, Ibrahim Jaber, El Hadi Idris Yahya, El Tahrir Abubakr Hajar, Raja Nicola, Abdulgasim Bortom, Yousef Jad Karim, Abdelbagi al-Zubeir and Salma Abdeljabbar.)	11 November 2021	Incumbent	7 years, 170 days	Military

== See also ==
- Politics of Sudan
- History of Sudan
- List of governors of pre-independence Sudan
- Vice President of Sudan
- List of heads of government of Sudan
