= El-Tigani el-Mahi =

Sudanese scholar and academic (1911–1970)

- التجاني الماحي
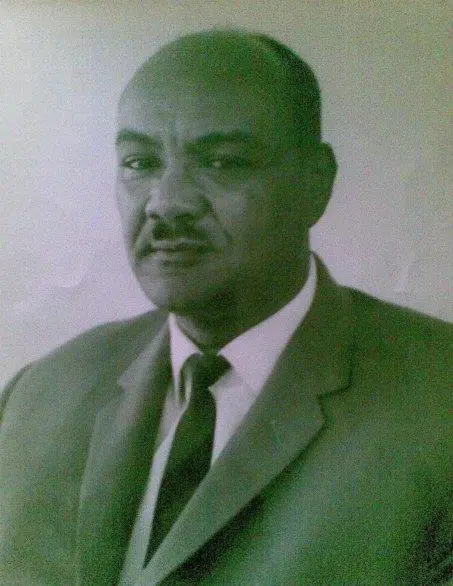
- El-Tigani el-Mahi in 1965

Member of the Sovereignty Council
- In office 3 December 1964 – 10 June 1965
- Prime Minister: Sirr Al-Khatim Al-Khalifa
- Preceded by: Sirr Al-Khatim Al-Khalifa (Acting)
- Succeeded by: Ismail al-Azhari

Personal details
- Born: April 1911 Omdurman, Anglo-Egyptian Sudan
- Died: 8 January 1970 (aged 58) Khartoum, Sudan
- Education: Kitchener School of Medicine (DKSM); University of London (diploma)
- Occupation: Psychiatrist; writer; politician; Egyptologist; antiquarian
- Other name: Father of African Psychiatry
- Employers: Union of Sudanese Doctors; Ministry of Health (Sudan); WHO-EMRO; Academy of the Arabic Language in Cairo; Graduates' General Congress

El-Tigani el-Mahi (Arabic: التجاني الماحي; April 1911 – 8 January 1970) was a Sudanese scholar, academic, and a pioneer of African psychiatry. He played a major role in the country's struggle for independence from British colonial rule, and was the transitional president of Sudan after the Sudanese October 1964 Revolution.

He was an avid collector of historical artefacts, and knowledgeable about Egyptology, and Sudan's history and literature.

== Early life ==
El-Tigani el-Mahi was born in Kawa village, White Nile Province in Anglo-Egyptian Sudan in April 1911. El-Mahi completed his primary education in Kawa, and middle school in Rufaa, Sudan. He relocated to Khartoum for his high school (secondary) education.

He earned a Diploma from the Kitchener School of Medicine (currently Faculty of Medicine, University of Khartoum) in 1935. The college was established by British colonial authorities to provide a Western-style education to Sudanese students, and many of its graduates went on to become prominent figures in Sudanese politics and society. While at the college, el-Mahi became involved in student politics and was a vocal advocate for Sudanese independence. He was also an avid reader and writer, and contributed articles and essays to the college newspaper and other publications. After his Diploma, he worked at the Sudan Medical Service, where he worked in Omdurman, Kosti, Khartoum, and Wadi Halfa.

== Psychiatric career ==
In 1947, el-Mahi went to London with a scholarship to study psychiatry. In July 1949, he obtained the Diploma in Psychological Medicine from the University of London, and was the first African psychiatrist.

Upon his return to Sudan, he established the Clinic for Nervous Disorders in Khartoum North. He worked in various locations across Sudan, including Omdurman, Kosti, Khartoum, and Wadi Halfa. He was appointed Director of Mental Health for the Ministry of Health in Sudan in 1957, a position he held until his death. el-Mahi later became the president of the Union of Sudanese Doctors in 1966. By 1969, he had become the first professor of psychiatry in Sudan and Chair of Psychiatry, Faculty of Medicine.

He was a mental health adviser for the Eastern Mediterranean Regional Office (EMRO) of the World Health Organization (WHO) from 1959 until 1964. He was the founding editor of the Sudanese Journal of Pediatrics, and one of the founders of the African Psychiatric Association. In 1961, he was given the title "Father of African Psychiatry" at the inaugural Pan-African Psychiatric Conference. During that meeting el-Mahi stated:

In African psychiatry, one can follow the early start, transformation, maturity and spread of psychiatric knowledge around the world today. (...) in light of this great continent, will lead us to new perspectives of understanding, where historical, social, economic and cultural factors merge, interact and emerge as an integral part of the concept of mental health. Here in Africa, the illustration that health is the community will be brought home to us more (...)

— El Tigani El Mahi, the first African Psychiatric Conference

el-Mahi is credited with establishing modern psychiatry in Sudan and played a key role in developing the mental health services in the country. He was a pioneer in the study of traditional medicine and ethnopsychiatry in Sudan, pioneering studies on magic, zaar, etc. and their relationship to mental health, while collaborating with traditional healers in Sudan. He asserted that patients were more cared for under religious-traditional healers than in hospitals. His writings on the subject covered a wide range of topics, including the use of traditional medicine in treating mental illness, the cultural aspects of mental health, and the challenges of providing mental health care in a resource-constrained environment. His first book, "Introduction to the History of Arab Medicine," was highly commended by academics and medical professionals throughout the Arab World. He published the book Psychiatry in Sudan in 1957.

el-Mahi was granted a Doctor of Science from Columbia University and the University of Khartoum. After his sudden death in 1970, a mental health hospital in Omdurman was named after him In 1971, the first of its kind for mental and neurological health in Sudan. In 1972, during the third Pan-African Psychiatric Conference, a memorial lecture was held in his honour.

== Writing career ==
el-Mahi's earliest writings date back to the 1940s as a medical student. He contributed to a number of medical journals, including the Sudan Medical Journal and the British Medical Journal. He also wrote about social issues, particularly those affecting the Sudanese community. In 1946, he published an article titled "The Sudan and World War II" in the Journal of the Sudanese Society, in which he discussed the impact of the war on the Sudanese people.

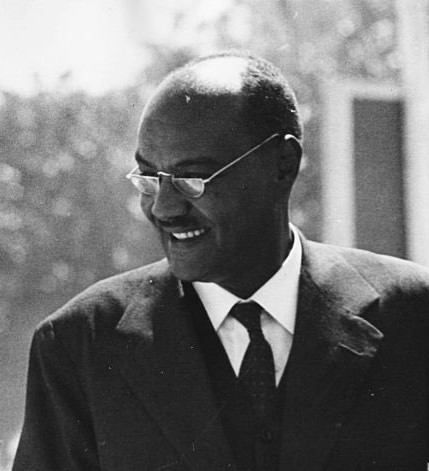
el-Tigani el-Mahi in 1965

el-Mahi was a prominent figure in Sudanese literary and intellectual circles who was also deeply involved in promoting education and cultural development in Sudan. He was deeply influenced by the ideas of pan-Arabism and pan-Africanism, and saw Sudan's future as part of a larger movement for political and cultural liberation across the continent. el-Mahi was one of the founders of the Sudanese Writers Union, an organisation that played a key role in promoting Sudanese literature and supporting the development of Sudanese writers. He also established the Institute of African and Asian Studies at the University of Khartoum, which became an important centre for research and scholarship on African and Asian cultures and societies. He was made a member of the Academy of the Arabic Language in Cairo. In addition to Arabic, he was also proficient in English, Hausa, Latin, and Persian.

el-Mahi's writings covered a wide range of topics, including history, politics, and culture. He wrote numerous articles and essays for newspapers and magazines in Sudan and abroad. He wrote about the importance of education in Sudan and the need for cultural preservation, and authored several books, including "The Cultural Heritage of the Sudan" and "The Life of Mohammed Ahmed Al-Mahdi".

el-Mahi studied ancient Egyptology archaeology and civilisations, and had knowledge of hieroglyphics. He translated several hieroglyphic inscriptions into Arabic and published articles on ancient Egyptian medicine and religion. He also wrote about the cultural and historical ties between Sudan and Egypt.

el-Mahi was also a collector of historical artefacts, including a large collection of General Gordon's correspondences and personal notes, which he presented to Queen Elizabeth II during the 1965 visit to Sudan. He collected 20 000 items including coins date back to the Alexander the Great era, and 6000 historical documents that now part of the University of Khartoum library.

== Political career ==
=== Before Sudan's independence ===
el-Mahi was one of the leading figures in this struggle, and his ideas and activism played an important role in shaping the direction of Sudanese nationalism and the broader independence movement. In the 1930s, el-Mahi became involved in nationalist politics in Sudan, and helped to found the Graduates' General Congress (GGC), a leading nationalist organisation that sought to mobilise Sudanese public opinion against British colonial rule. el-Mahi was involved with the GGC and was a vocal advocate for Sudanese independence.

In the years leading up to independence, there were many political and social conflicts within Sudanese society, as various groups vied for power and influence. The Sudanese Communist Party (SCP), which had a significant following among urban workers and intellectuals, was one of the most influential organisations during this period. el-Mahi was critical of the SCP's tactics and ideology, but he also recognised the important role that the party played in the broader struggle for independence.

=== After Sudan's independence ===
Sudan gained independence from the Anglo-Egyptian Condominium on 1 January 1956, without agreeing on the form and content of a permanent constitution. Instead, the Constituent Assembly adopted a document known as the Transitional Constitution, which replaced the governor-general as head of state with a five-member Supreme Commission elected by a parliament composed of an indirectly elected Senate. During the year when his country gained independence, el-Mahi joined the Egyptian Medical Corps as a chief psychiatrist to support the resistance against the 1956 tripartite invasion of Egypt. He re-visited Egypt in December 1964 to celebrate Egypt's Victory Day in Port Said with President Gamal Abdel Nasser.

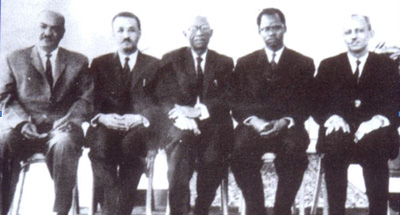
The Second Sudanese Sovereignty Council from left to right: Tigani el-Mahi, Mubarak Shadad, Ibrahim Yusuf Sulayman, Luigi Adwok Bong Gicomeho and Abdel Halim Mohamed

However, the new government faced a wide range of challenges as it sought to build a unified and prosperous Sudanese state. Between 1956 and 1965, Sudan was plagued by political instability and numerous military coups. During this period, Sudan was ruled by the military for eight years, including the periods of Ibrahim Abboud's presidency (1958–1964) and the First Sudanese Civil War (1955–1972). The military coups further exacerbated political instability and stymied democratic governance.

During this time, professionals and workers demanded deep socio-economic reforms to strengthen democracy, which led to the victory over the military regime. After the Sudanese October 1964 Revolution overthrow General Ibrahim Abboud, el-Mahi served as a member of the first Committee of Sovereignty, from 3 December 1964 to 10 June 1965, which presided over the interim coalition Government that paved the way for general elections. He served as president of the council and thus head of state in 1965.

=== 1965 Elizabeth II's visit to Sudan ===
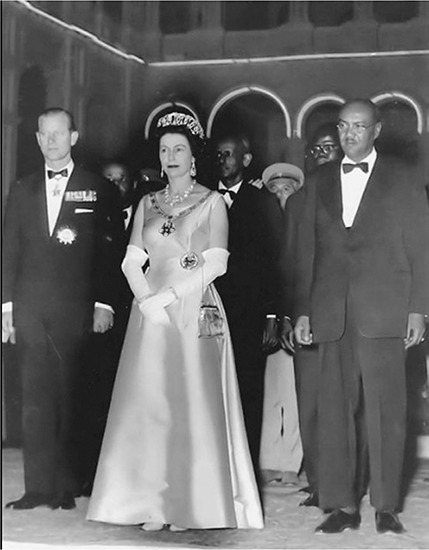
Elizabeth II during her visit to Sudan in February 1965. Left to her is Prince Philip, Duke of Edinburgh, on her right is el-Mahi and behind her is Abdel Halim Mohamed.

On 8 February 1965, Elizabeth II visited Sudan and met with El Tigani El-Mahi, the President of the Supreme Council at the time. The visit included stops in Khartoum and El Obeid. The Queen's four-day visit, the first after Sudan's independence and part of a Commonwealth tour, served to strengthen the relationship between Sudan and the United Kingdom, and marked a moment of political and cultural exchange between the two nations. On her first day, Queen Elizabeth and Prince Philip were welcomed by President El Tigani El-Mahi at Khartoum airport, before being welcomed by a large crowd as they drove from the airport to the Republican Palace, and she stayed at the colonial-era Grand Hotel in Khartoum, during her visit. In a photograph taken during the state drive from Khartoum Airport, El Tigani El-Mahi is seen standing on the right side of the Queen's car, while an army officer from the entourage stands on the left. Prince Philip is also visible in the photograph, standing on the left and wearing a trilby hat.

The Queen also received a garland of flowers from two girls in Khartoum, as part of the warm welcome she received during her visit. One of the highlights of the Queen's visit was the afternoon of camel racing, which she attended with El Tigani El-Mahi. The two were seen together in an open-topped Rolls Royce car as they drove onto the race course, accompanied by a crowd of excited Sudanese spectators. The Queen also witnessed tribal dancing during her visit, adding to the cultural exchange that took place between the two countries.

The Queen and Prince Philip, Duke of Edinburgh were also received by the people of Omdurman, including the Mayor Mansour Ali Haseeb, and the welcoming ceremony included a traditional Sudanese dance performance. The Queen and Prince Philip also visited El Obeid, where they were greeted by the province high commissioner, Sayed Suleeman Wagieallah.

=== Later years ===
Sudan experienced its second democratic era, also known as the Second Democracy. The Second Democracy in Sudan refers to a period of time from 1965 to 1969 when political parties returned and competed in elections, which were held by the transitional government in April and May 1965. During this period, radical professionals and workers demanded socio-economic reforms to strengthen democracy and succeeded in defeating the military regime that had ruled Sudan before. However, this democratic era was short-lived as a successful coup d'état took place in 1969, led by Colonel Gaafar Nimeiry against the government of President Ismail al-Azhari and Prime Minister. This coup signalled the end of Sudan's second democratic era and saw the beginning of Nimeiry's 16-year rule.

During that period, el-Mahi remained committed to his vision of Sudanese nationalism and cultural identity, and was critical of many of the policies and practices of the post-independence governments. He was particularly concerned about issues of regional inequality and the marginalisation of certain groups within Sudanese society, and advocated for a more inclusive and egalitarian approach to governance. However, he focused on his literary and psychiatric work.

== Death ==
el-Mahi died in Khartoum on 8 January 1970. He is remembered as one of the most important intellectual and political figures in Sudanese history, and his contributions to the country's struggle for independence, Sudanese culture, politics, and intellectual life continue to be celebrated by scholars and activists today.
