= Luigi Adwok =

Sudanese politician (1929–2010)

- لويجي أدوك
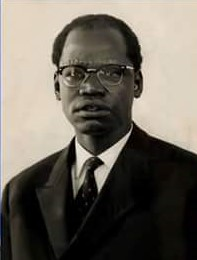

Member of the 3rd Sovereignty Council
- In office 10 June 1965 – 14 June 1965
- Prime Minister: Muhammad Ahmad Mahgoub
- Preceded by: 2nd Sovereignty Council
- Succeeded by: Gaafar Nimeiry

Member of the 2nd Sovereignty Council
- In office 3 December 1964 – 10 June 1965
- Prime Minister: Sirr Al-Khatim Al-Khalifa
- Preceded by: Ibrahim Abboud
- Succeeded by: Ismail al-Azhari with 3rd Sovereignty Council

Personal details
- Born: Luigi Adwok Bong Gicomeho; 24 March 1929 Agodo, Kodok, Upper Nile
- Died: 21 May 2010 (aged 81) Khartoum, Sudan
- Resting place: Upper Nile, South Sudan
- Party: Southern Front; Liberal Party

Luigi Adwok Bong Gicomeho (24 March 1929 – 21 May 2010), also known as Luigi Adwok, was a South Sudanese politician who played a role in the political landscape of post-independence Sudan from the late 1950s into the 1980s. Gicomeho was one of the first Southern Sudanese officials to serve as head of state of the Republic of Sudan as President of the Second Sudanese Sovereignty Council in March 1965.

== Early life and education ==
Luigi Adwok Bong Gicomeho was born on 24 March 1929 in Agodo, Kodok, Upper Nile. He received his education at Lul Elementary School (1940–1943), St Antony in Bussere (1944–1947), and Rumbek Secondary School (1948-1950). In 1954, he obtained his teaching qualification from the Bakhtalruda Intermediate Teacher Training Institute and taught at several intermediate schools, such as Juba Intermediate.

== Political career ==
=== Senate ===
In 1958, Adwok entered politics of the nascent Republic of Sudan, which had gained independence from the Anglo-Egyptian condominium in 1956. He was elected to the Senate as a member of the Liberal Party in 1958 and later became the party's secretary general. However, due to a 1958 military coup led by General Ibrahim Abboud, the parliament was disbanded, and Adwok resumed his teaching career.

=== Second Sudanese Sovereignty Council ===
Adwok taught at Juba Intermediate from 1958 to 1963 and served as the headmaster of Tombura Intermediate School in 1963 and 1964. Following the collapse of the Abboud regime in the October 1964 Revolution, Adwok, who was in prison in Juba, was chosen to represent the Southern Front (SF) on the ruling Second Sudanese Sovereignty Council. The president of the council was elected on a rotational basis to lead the country and act as the head of state. He was the council’s president from 1 to 31 March 1965, one of the first Southern Sudanese officials to lead Sudan.

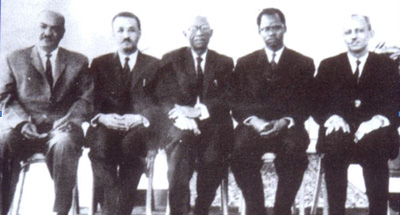
The Second Sudanese Sovereignty Council from left to right: Tigani El Mahi, Mubarak Shadad, Ibrahim Yusuf Sulayman, Luigi Adwok Bong Gicomeho and Abdel Halim Mohamed.

=== Post-council ===
The council was dissolved after the 1965 Sudanese parliamentary election, and Adwok went on to hold a number of political positions, including the Southern Front's Secretary for Planning and Organization from 1966 to 1967. He resigned from this role to run as an independent candidate in the supplementary elections in Southern Sudan. This decision strained his relationship with the Southern Front, which boycotted the elections. He also participated in the 1968 Sudanese parliamentary election and returned to the National Assembly of Sudan.

Later, Adwok worked at the Sudan Research Unit in Khartoum (1967, 1969-1971), served on the Sudanese Socialist Union's Preparatory Committee (1971), and held regional ministerial positions in Juba, including Minister of Works, Commissioner of Upper Nile, and Minister of Education.

==== Regional Minister of Education ====
As a regional Minister of Education, In 1972, Juba experienced its first student protest because of shortage of schools and books, as well as the transfer of a popular school principal. During the protest, Adwok's deputy was injured. Adwok instructed teachers to teach the local tribal language beginning in first grade, followed by Arabic, and introduce English in seventh grade. This elicited controversy due to perceived deprioritisation of English. Also, during Adwok's tenure the University of Juba was established in September 1977.

== Death ==
Adwok retired from active politics in April 1985. He died in Khartoum on 21 May 2010, after a long illness. He was buried on 23 May in his native village in Agodo.

Sudanese President Omer Al-Bashir expressed condolences to Adwok's family. Riek Machar, the Vice President-designate, represented Southern Sudan president Salva Kiir and the government at the burial ceremony in the state capital, Malakal. During the ceremony, Machar referred to Adwok as a father figure and leader for both South and South Sudan.

== See also ==
- Santino Deng Teng – Sudanese politician (born 1922)
- Buth Diu – Sudanese politician (died 1972)
- Stanislaus Paysama – Southern Sudanese politician (died 1985)
- Abdel Rahman Sule – Southern Sudanese politician
- Siricio Iro Wani – Southern Sudanese politician (1919–1985)
