= Ibrahim Yusuf Sulayman =

Sudanese politician (1908–1982)

- إبراهيم يوسف سليمان
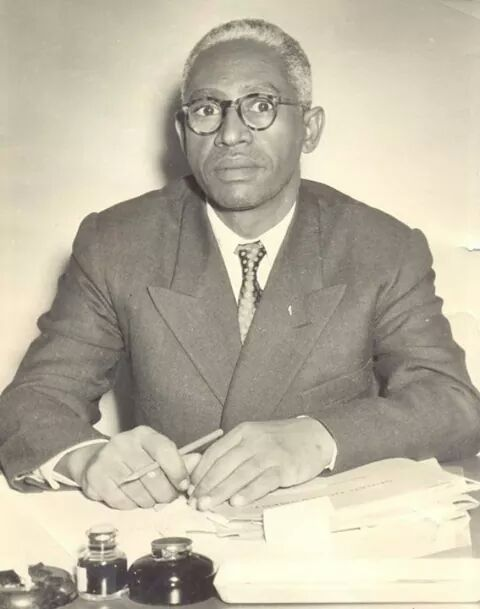

Member of the Sovereignty Council
- In office 3 December 1964 – 10 June 1965
- Prime Minister: Sirr Al-Khatim Al-Khalifa
- Preceded by: Ibrahim Abboud
- Succeeded by: Ismail al-Azhari

Personal details
- Born: Ibrahim Yusuf Sulayman Mohamed al-Kawahli; 1908 Beit Al-Mal, Omdurman
- Died: 3 May 1982 (aged 73–74)
- Party: Democratic Unionist Party; People's Democratic Party
- Education: Gordon Memorial College (1928)

Ibrahim Yusuf Sulayman (Arabic: إبراهيم يوسف سليمان; 1908–3 May 1982) was a Sudanese politician who played a role in the political landscape of pre and post-independence Sudan. He served as the head of state of the Republic of Sudan as Chair of the Second Sudanese Sovereignty Council.

== Early life and education ==
Ibrahim Yusuf Sulayman was born in 1908 in Beit Al-Mal, Omdurman and he belongs to the Kawahla people. His father, Sheikh Youssef Suleiman, worked with Khalifa al-Mahdi, and he held the position of custodian of Bayt al-mal, a treasury in old Islamic states. Sulayman was the youngest of his siblings. He received his elementary education in Omdurman and Rufaa, and then joined Gordon Memorial College and graduated as an accountant in 1928.

== Career ==
After the 1924 Sudanese uprising, Sulayman co-founded the famous Aburov Literary Society with Khadir Hamid and Ismail al-Atabani, among others. In 1944, the Graduates' General Congress formed, in which political life took place, and parties were born. The Aburov Literary Society joined the congress. He became a member of the Congress Senate Committee and helped draft the famous conference memorandum. From the Aburov Literary Society, the National Unionist Party (later became the Democratic Unionist Party) was founded in 1952, and he was the first secretary of the party.

Sulayman worked in the state in different regions and was chosen among a small group to occupy the position of deputy commissioner. Still, Ibrahim Youssef refused this position because it included swearing allegiance to the British crown, so he was transferred to Gedaref. There he formed a cell for the Graduates' General Congress, which was joined by a number of Gedaref residents at that time.

Sulayman was chosen as a member of the Sudanization Committee that paved the way for independence. Ibrahim Youssef was the last chairman of the Sudanization Committee in December 1955, and he was the one who evaluated the documents and the final speech of the committee to the Council of Ministers before the independence. After independence, he was a director of the National Electricity Corporation and Minister of Social Affairs.

=== Second Sudanese Sovereignty Council ===
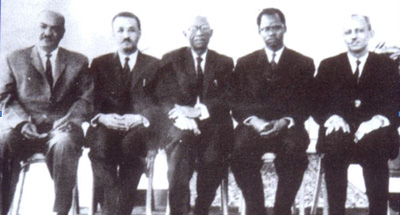
The Second Sudanese Sovereignty Council from left to right: Tigani El Mahi, Mubarak Shadad, Ibrahim Yusuf Sulayman, Luigi Adwok Bong Gicomeho and Abdel Halim Mohamed.

Following October 1964 Revolution and the removal of Abboud, he was chosen as a member of the Sovereignty Council, representing the People's Democratic Party and serving as a member with Tigani El Mahi (Academic / Independent), Mubarak Shadad (Democratic Unionist Party), Luigi Adwok Bong Gicomeho (Southern Front) and Abdel Halim Mohamed (Umma Party) from 3 December 1964 – 10 June 1965. He was the president of the council, and consequently the head of the state between from 6–31 December 1964 and 1–10 June 1965. The Second Sudanese Sovereignty Council was formed to oversee the transition to civilian rule. Sirr Al-Khatim Al-Khalifa, a respected Sudanese politician, served as the Prime Minister from 30 October 1964 to 2 June 1965. Al-Khalifa, who had been a vocal critic of General Abboud's regime, was seen as a unifying figure during the transition.
