= List of heads of government of Sudan =

Prime Minister of the Republic of the Sudan
- رئيس وزراء جمهورية السودان (Arabic)
- Emblem of Sudan

- Flag of Sudan

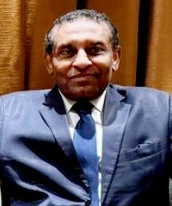
- Incumbent; Kamil Idris since 31 May 2025
- Executive branch of the Sudanese Government
- Seat: Khartoum
- Appointer: Transitional Sovereignty Council
- Formation: 1 January 1956
- First holder: Ismail al-Azhari

This article lists the heads of government of Sudan since the establishment of the office of Chief Minister of the Anglo-Egyptian Sudan in 1952.

The office of prime minister was abolished after the 1989 coup d'état, and reestablished in 2017 as deputy head of government when Bakri Hassan Saleh was appointed prime minister by President Omar al-Bashir.

The current prime minister is Kamil Idris. He was appointed by the Transitional Sovereignty Council on 31 May 2025.

== Titles of heads of government ==
- 1952–1956: Chief Minister
- 1956–1989; 2019–present: Prime Minister

== Heads of government of Sudan ==
(Dates in italics indicate de facto continuation of office)

No.	Portrait	Name (Birth–Death)	Term of office			Political party	Head(s) of state (Term)
No.	Portrait	Name (Birth–Death)	Took office	Left office	Time in office	Political party	Head(s) of state (Term)
=== Anglo-Egyptian Sudan (1952–1956) ===
1		Abdul Rahman al-Mahdi (1885–1959) (Note: Posthumous son of Muhammad Ahmad; Imam of the Ansar.)	22 October 1952	November 1953	1 year, 10 days	National Umma Party	
2		Ismail al-Azhari (1900–1969)	6 January 1954	1 January 1956	1 year, 360 days	Democratic Unionist Party	First Sovereignty Council (1955–1958)
=== Republic of the Sudan (1956–1969) ===
(2)		Ismail al-Azhari (1900–1969)	1 January 1956	5 July 1956	186 days	Democratic Unionist Party	First Sovereignty Council (1955–1958)
3		Abdallah Khalil (1892–1970)	5 July 1956	17 November 1958 (Note: Carried out a self-coup against his own government.)	2 years, 135 days	National Umma Party	First Sovereignty Council (1955–1958)
4		Ibrahim Abboud (1900–1983)	18 November 1958	30 October 1964 (Resigned)	5 years, 347 days	Military	Ibrahim Abboud (1958–1964)
5		Sirr Al-Khatim Al-Khalifa (1919–2006)	30 October 1964	2 June 1965	215 days	Independent	Second Sovereignty Council (1964–1965)
6		Muhammad Ahmad Mahgoub (1908–1976)	10 June 1965	25 July 1966	1 year, 53 days	National Umma Party	Third Sovereignty Council (1965–1969) Ismail al-Azhari (1965–1969)
7		Sadiq al-Mahdi (1935–2020) (Note: Grandson of Abd al-Rahman al-Mahdi; Imam of the Ansar.)	27 July 1966	18 May 1967	295 days	National Umma Party	Third Sovereignty Council (1965–1969) Ismail al-Azhari (1965–1969)
(6)		Muhammad Ahmad Mahgoub (1908–1976)	18 May 1967	25 May 1969 (Deposed)	2 years, 7 days	National Umma Party	Third Sovereignty Council (1965–1969) Ismail al-Azhari (1965–1969)
=== Democratic Republic of the Sudan (1969–1985) ===
8		Babiker Awadalla (1917–2019)	25 May 1969	27 October 1969	155 days	Independent	Gaafar Nimeiry (1969–1985)
9		Gaafar Nimeiry (1930–2009)	28 October 1969	19 July 1971 (Deposed)	1 year, 264 days	Military / Sudanese Socialist Union	Gaafar Nimeiry (1969–1985)
Post vacant (19 – 23 July 1971)							Gaafar Nimeiry (1969–1985)
(9)		Gaafar Nimeiry (1930–2009)	23 July 1971 (Restored)	11 August 1976	5 years, 19 days	Military / Sudanese Socialist Union	Gaafar Nimeiry (1969–1985)
10		Rashid Bakr (1933–1988)	11 August 1976	10 September 1977	1 year, 30 days	Sudanese Socialist Union	Gaafar Nimeiry (1969–1985)
(9)		Gaafar Nimeiry (1930–2009)	10 September 1977	6 April 1985 (Deposed)	7 years, 208 days	Military / Sudanese Socialist Union	Gaafar Nimeiry (1969–1985)
=== Republic of the Sudan (1985–2019) ===
11		Al-Jazuli Daf'allah (born 1935)	22 April 1985	6 May 1986	1 year, 14 days	Independent	Abdel Rahman Swar al-Dahab (1985–1986)
(7)		Sadiq al-Mahdi (1935–2020)	6 May 1986	30 June 1989 (Deposed)	3 years, 55 days	National Umma Party	Ahmed al-Mirghani (1986–1989)
Post abolished (30 June 1989 – 2 March 2017)
12		Bakri Hassan Saleh (born 1949)	2 March 2017	10 September 2018	1 year, 192 days	National Congress Party	Omar al-Bashir (1989–2019)
13		Motazz Moussa (born 1967)	10 September 2018	22 February 2019	165 days	National Congress Party	Omar al-Bashir (1989–2019)
14		Mohamed Tahir Ayala (1951–2025)	24 February 2019	11 April 2019 (Deposed)	46 days	National Congress Party	Omar al-Bashir (1989–2019)
=== Transitional period (2019–present) ===
Post vacant (11 April – 21 August 2019)
15		Abdalla Hamdok (born 1956)	21 August 2019	25 October 2021 (Deposed)	2 years, 65 days	Forces of Freedom and Change	Transitional Sovereignty Council (2019–present) (Note: Briefly interrupted following the 2021 coup d'état, when Abdel Fattah al-Burhan served as head of state and there was no prime minister.)
(15)		Abdalla Hamdok (born 1956)	21 November 2021	2 January 2022	42 days	Independent	Transitional Sovereignty Council (2019–present)
—		Osman Hussein; Acting Prime Minister	19 January 2022	30 April 2025	3 years, 101 days	Independent	Transitional Sovereignty Council (2019–present)
—		Dafallah al-Haj Ali; Acting Prime Minister	30 April 2025	31 May 2025	31 days	Independent	Transitional Sovereignty Council (2019–present)
16		Kamil Idris (born 1954)	31 May 2025	Incumbent	1 year, 162 days	Independent	Transitional Sovereignty Council (2019–present)

== See also ==
- Politics of Sudan
- History of Sudan
- List of governors of pre-independence Sudan
- List of heads of state of Sudan
- Vice President of Sudan
