= Khader Hamad =

Sudanese politician (1910 – 1970)

- خضر حمد
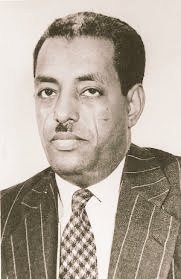

Member of the Sovereignty Council
- In office 10 June 1965 – 25 May 1969
- President: Ismail al-Azhari
- Prime Minister: Muhammad Ahmad Mahgoub
- Preceded by: Sovereignty Council (1964–1965)
- Succeeded by: Gaafar Nimeiry

Personal details
- Born: 1910
- Died: 1970 (aged 59–60)
- Party: Democratic Unionist Party

Khader Hamad (Arabic: خضر حمد; 1910 – 1970) was a Sudanese politician. He was one of the founders of the Graduates' General Congress in 1938 which advocated for Sudan independence. He was a prominent employee in the Ministry of Finance in Khartoum until 1946, after which he represent Sudan in the Arab League.

With the growing activity of the National Movement in Sudan, Hamad decided to leave his job in the Arab League in 1951. Khader Hamad held several ministerial positions and was a member of the Democratic Unionist Party. He became a member of the Sovereignty Council on 10 June 1965. The council came after general parliamentary elections in 1965, and was chaired by Ismail al-Azhari. The Council was dissolved on 25 May 1969 after Lieutenant General Jaafar al-Numeiri's 1969 coup.

Hamad's book This is Freemasonry (Arabic: هذه هى الماسونية) was published in May 1969.
