= List of ambassadors of Sudan to China =

Coordinates: 39.939032°N 116.451495°E

Ambassador of Sudan to China
- Incumbent; Mirghani Mohamed Salih since February 25, 2003
- Inaugural holder: Fakhr ed-Dine Mohamed
- Formation: 1964

The Sudanese Ambassador in Beijing is the official representative of the Government of in Khartoum to the Government of the People's Republic of China.

== List of representatives ==
diplomatic agreement/designated/Diplomatic accreditation	ambassador	Observations	List of heads of state of Sudan	Premier of the People's Republic of China	Term end
January 1, 1956		Independence of the Sudan from the United Kingdom	Sovereignty Council	Zhou Enlai	
February 4, 1959		The governments in Khartoum and Beijing established diplomatic relations.	Ibrahim Abbud	Zhou Enlai	
1964	Fakhr ed-Dine Mohamed		Souveränitätskommitee	Zhou Enlai	1969
1970	Abdel Wahab Zein al-Abdein		Dschafar Muhammad an-Numairi	Zhou Enlai	1975
1975	Sayed Ali Yassin Galley		Dschafar Muhammad an-Numairi	Zhou Enlai	1976
1976	Mubarak Osman Rahama		Dschafar Muhammad an-Numairi	Hua Guofeng	1980
November 27, 1980	Muhammad Hamad Muhammad Mattar		Dschafar Muhammad an-Numairi	Zhao Ziyang	1989
February 8, 1990	Anmar El-Hadi Abdel Rahman		Omar al-Bashir	Li Peng	1993
August 27, 1998	Abdelhameed Abdeen Mohammed		Omar al-Bashir	Zhu Rongji	
February 25, 2003	Mirghani Mohamed Salih		Omar al-Bashir	Wen Jiabao	
