= Mubarak Shaddad =

Sudanese politician (1915–1980s)

- مبارك شداد
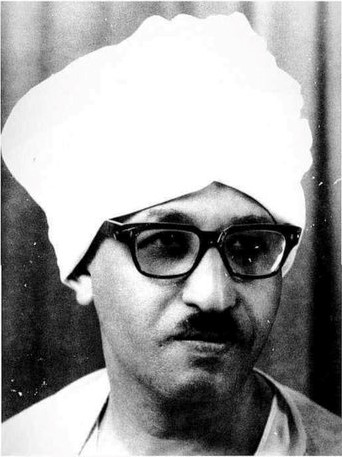

Member of the Sovereignty Council
- In office 3 December 1964 – 10 June 1965
- Prime Minister: Sirr Al-Khatim Al-Khalifa
- Preceded by: Ibrahim Abboud
- Succeeded by: Ismail al-Azhari

Personal details
- Born: Mubarak al-Fadil Shaddad; 1915 Bara, Sudan
- Died: 1997 (aged 81–82)
- Party: Democratic Unionist Party
- Relatives: Kamal Shaddad (cousin)
- Education: Kitchener School of Medicine

Mubarak al-Fadil Shaddad (Arabic: مبارك الفاضل شداد; 1915–1980s) was a Sudanese medical professional and politician. He worked as a specialist in obstetrics and gynecology, eventually becoming the director of the Omdurman Teaching Hospital. He actively participated in the Sudanese Medical Association and played a role in the popular October 1964 Revolution, advocating for political change in Sudan. Shaddad served in the Second Sudanese Sovereignty Council and briefly held the position of head of state. He also presided over the Constituent Assembly but was overthrown by a coup d'état in 1969.

== Early life and education ==
Mubarak Al-Fadil Shaddad was born in 1915, in Bara, Sudan. He completed a Diploma from Kitchener School of Medicine in 1934 and then worked in Omdurman, Khartoum, Juba, Yei, Sinja, Sennar, Ad-Damazin, Gedaref and El Obeid.

== Medical career ==
Shaddad worked in the Omdurman Teaching Hospital 1961-1964 where he became a senior specialist in obstetrics and gynaecology, and then a director. His contributions extended to the Council of the Sudanese Medical Association, where he actively participated for several sessions from 1961 to 1964.

== Political career ==
Beyond his medical and academic endeavors, he held key positions such as Secretary of the Graduates' General Congress in Juba from 1939 to 1940, and the President from 1943 to 1945. The Graduates' General Congress drafted the first memorandum in 1942, demanding independence from the Anglo-Egyptian occupation. He served as the mayor of El Obeid Municipality and concurrently held the position of president of its local Football Association from 1951 to 1956.

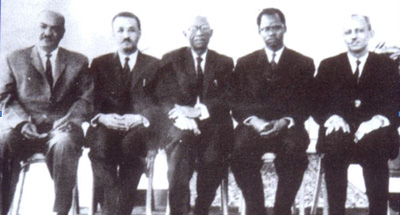
The Second Committee of Sovereignty (3 December 1964–10 June 1965) from left to right: Tigani El Mahi, Mubarak Shadad, Ibrahim Yusuf Sulayman, Luigi Adwok Bong Gicomeho and Abdel Halim Mohamed

Shaddad was among the representatives of the Doctors Syndicate during the popular October 1964 Revolution, standing at the forefront of the movement that led to significant political changes in Sudan. He was offered the position of Premiership, but he declined the opportunity due to Lieutenant General Abboud's presidency at that time. Following from the removal of Abboud, he assumed roles in the Second Sudanese Sovereignty Council, serving as a member and later as a rotating president from 3 December 1964 – 10 June 1965. He was the president of the council, and consequently the head of the state between 1–31 Jan 1965 and 1–10 June 1965 .

Shaddad became the president of the Constituent Assembly for the 1966–1968 session, which was later dissolved by the 1969 Sudanese coup d'état.
