= Sudanese Sovereignty Council (1965–1969) =

Leadership of Sudan (June 1965 – May 1969)

Their Excellency Sudanese Sovereignty Council
- مجلس السيادة السوداني
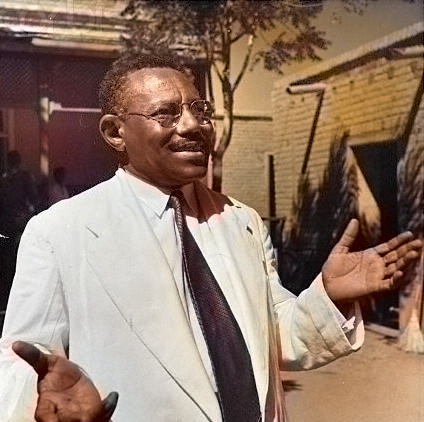
- Ismail al-Azhari, the leader of the Council

Head of State of Sudan
- In office 10 June 1965 – 25 May 1969
- President: Ismail al-Azhari
- Prime Minister: Muhammad Ahmad Mahgoub (10 June 1965–25 July 1966); Sadiq al-Mahdi (27 July 1966–18 May 1967); Muhammad Ahmad Mahgoub
- Preceded by: Sudanese Sovereignty Council (1964–1965)
- Succeeded by: Gaafar Nimeiry

The Third Sudanese Sovereignty Council (10 June 1965 – 25 May 1969) was the council that came after general parliamentary elections in 1965, the third in the history of Sudan, as it replaced the Second Sudanese Sovereignty Council, which was managing the country's affairs for a transitional period after the overthrow of the rule of Lieutenant General Ibrahim Abboud. The Third Sovereignty Council consisted of five members, and its members were amended twice. The Chairman of the Sovereignty Council was Ismail al-Azhari. The council was dissolved after Lieutenant General Jaafar al-Numeiri's 1969 coup against power, who in turn formed the Revolutionary Command Council, which replaced the Sovereignty Council.

== Council members ==
The first line-up came to power from 10 June 1965 until 8 July 1965, and it was composed of:

- Ismail al-Azhari (Democratic Unionist Party)
- Khader Hamad (Democratic Unionist Party)
- Abdullah al-Fadil al-Mahdi (National Umma Party)
- Abdel Halim Mohamed (National Umma Party)
- Luigi Adwok Bong Gicomeho (Southern Front) who resigned on 14 June 1965

The second line-up came to power on 18 July 1965 until 1967 after an amendment to its members which came. The council became composed of:

- Ismail al-Azhari (Democratic Unionist Party)
- Khader Hamad (Democratic Unionist Party)
- Daoud Al-Khalifa Abdullah
- Philemon Majok (Democratic Unionist Party) from 5 July 1965
- Abdul Rahman Abdoun

The third line saw Philemon Majok and Abdul Rahman Abdoun leaving, lasted until 25 May 1969, and was composed of:

- Ismail al-Azhari (Democratic Unionist Party)
- Khader Hamad (Democratic Unionist Party)
- Daoud Al-Khalifa Abdullah
- Jarvis Yak
- Fadil al-Mahdi Bushra
