= Ahmad al-Qurashi =

Sudanese student killed by police (1942–1964)

- أحمد القرشي
- Born: 1942; El-Garrassa
- Died: 1964 (aged 21–22); University of Khartoum
- Cause of death: Police gunshot
- Other name: Ahmed El-Gorashy Taaha
- Citizenship: Sudan

Ahmad al-Qurashi or Ahmed El-Gorashy Taaha (Arabic) (1942–October 1964), known also as El-shaheed (or Martyr) El-Gorashy, was a student in Khartoum University who was killed by the police in October 1964 at the time of a huge uprising, the Thoraat October or October Revolution, which led to the overthrow of the Ibrahim Abboud military regime.

== Early life and education ==
Al-Qurashi was born in El-Garrassa village close to El-Mannaqel town, Al Jazirah State of Sudan,

He got his intermediate education in El-dlennj School in El-dlennj town, located in the Nuba Mountains region. In 1958, he attended El-shir Secondary School in El-fashir town. He attended Khartoum University in the early 1960s.

== Police incident ==
Al-Qurashi was shot by police during an invasion of student accommodation by police force.
