= Sayed Ahmad Keir =

Sudanese politician

Sayed Ahmad Keir (1905–1994) was a Sudanese politician and diplomat. Keir was appointed to the post of Foreign Minister of Sudan from 1958–1964.

Preceded by Muhammad Ahmad Mahgoub	Foreign Minister of Republic of Sudan; 1958–1964	Succeeded by Muhammad Ahmad Mahgoub
