= Sudanese Sovereignty Council (1964–1965) =

Leadership of Sudan (Dec 1964 – Jun 1965)

Their Excellency Sudanese Sovereignty Council
- مجلس السيادة السوداني
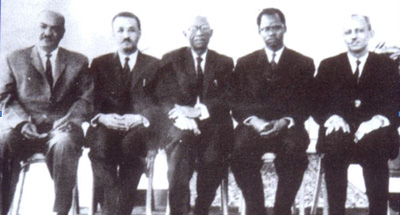
- The 1964 Sovereignty Council from left to right: Tigani El Mahi, Mubarak Shadad, Ibrahim Yusuf Sulayman, Luigi Adwok Bong Gicomeho and Abdel Halim Mohamed

Head of State of Sudan
- In office 3 December 1964 – 10 June 1965
- Prime Minister: Sirr Al-Khatim Al-Khalifa
- Preceded by: Sirr Al-Khatim Al-Khalifa (acting)
- Succeeded by: Ismail al-Azhari

The Second Sudanese Sovereignty Council (3 December 1964 – 10 June 1965) emerged as a result of the October 1964 Revolution, a popular uprising against the military dictatorship of General Ibrahim Abboud.

== Background ==
Abboud's regime, which came to power after 1958 Sudanese coup d'état, was marked by authoritarian rule and economic mismanagement. The Sudanese people, frustrated with their living conditions and political repression, took to the streets demanding change. The October 1964 Revolution, also known as the October Revolution, was a series of protests and demonstrations that eventually forced General Abboud to step down from power. The revolution began with student-led demonstrations in the city of Wad Medani, triggered by the government's decision to increase prices of basic commodities. The protests quickly spread to other cities, including Khartoum, the capital of Sudan.

== Formation ==
As the revolution gained momentum, a transitional period emerged, marked by negotiations and power-sharing arrangements. On 3 December 1964, General Abboud resigned, and a new government, known as the Second Sudanese Sovereignty Council, was formed to oversee the transition to civilian rule. The Second Sovereignty Council acted as a collective presidency, consisting of five members, Tigani El Mahi (Academic / Independent), Mubarak Shadad (Democratic Unionist Party), Ibrahim Yusuf Sulayman (People's Democratic Party), Luigi Adwok Bong Gicomeho (Southern Front) and Abdel Halim Mohamed (Umma Party). The Second Sudanese Sovereignty Council consisted of prominent political figures who played crucial roles during this period. Sirr Al-Khatim Al-Khalifa, a respected Sudanese politician, served as the Prime Minister from 30 October 1964 to 2 June 1965. Al-Khalifa, who had been a vocal critic of General Abboud's regime, was seen as a unifying figure during the transition.

== Tenure ==
The Second Sovereignty Council faced numerous challenges during its tenure. Its primary objective was to oversee the drafting of a new constitution and pave the way for democratic elections. However, internal divisions and competing interests among council members hindered progress. Additionally, the council had to contend with external pressures and regional dynamics, such as the ongoing Cold War. Despite these challenges, the Second Sudanese Sovereignty Council managed to accomplish several significant milestones. One of its notable achievements was the promulgation of the Interim Constitution of 1964, which aimed to establish a framework for democratic governance. The council also facilitated the release of political prisoners and initiated a series of reforms to address social and economic grievances.

Furthermore, the Second Sovereignty Council played a crucial role in organising the general elections held in April 1965 and welcomed the 1965 Elizabeth II's visit to Sudan. These elections marked an important milestone in Sudan's political history as they led to the establishment of a civilian government. Ismail al-Azhari, a prominent Sudanese politician, assumed the presidency after winning the elections, and Muhammad Ahmad Mahgoub replaced Sirr Al-Khatim Al-Khalifa as prime minister. In June 1965, the council was dissolved, and power was transferred to the newly elected civilian government. The transition to civilian rule marked a significant milestone in Sudan's history, as it represented a departure from military-dominated governance, until the 1969 Sudanese coup d'état.

== Council's presidents ==
Members of the council rotated to be the president monthly. The president of the council was consequently the head of the state. The council's presidents were:

- Ibrahim Yusuf Sulayman, from 6 December 1964 to 31 December 1964
- Mubarak Shadad, from 1 January 1965 to 31 January 1965 and from 1 June 1965 to 10 June 1965
- Tigani El Mahi, from 1 February 1965 to 28 February 1965
- Luigi Adwok Bong Gicomeho, from 1 March 1965 to 31 March 1965
- Abdel Halim Mohamed, from 1 April 1965 to 30 April 1965
- Ibrahim Yusuf Sulayman, from 1 May 1965 to 31 May 1965
