= Kamal Shaddad =

Sudanese sport administrator (born 1938)

- كمال شداد

4th President of the Sudan Football Association
- In office 29 October 2017 – 13 November 2021
- Preceded by: Mamoun Mubark Aman
- Succeeded by: Omer Al Bakri Abu Haraz

President of the Sudan Football Association
- In office 2001 – August 2010
- Preceded by: Omer Al Bakri Abu Haraz
- Succeeded by: Mutasim Jaafar Sarkhatm

President of the Sudan Football Association
- In office 1988–1995
- Preceded by: Mutasim Jaafar Sarkhatm
- Succeeded by: Mutasim Jaafar Sarkhatm

Personal details
- Born: Kamal Hamid Shaddad; 1935 (age 90–91) El-Obeid, North Kurdufan, Sudan
- Spouse: Ibtisam Hassab Al-Rasoul

Kamal Shaddad (Arabic: كمال شداد; born 1935) is a Sudanese professor of Philosophy, journalist and sport administrator. He was the President of the Sudanese Football Association for more than 20 years between 1988 and 2021.

== Early life and education ==
Kamal Hamid Shaddad was born in El-Obeid, North Kurdufan, Sudan, in 1935. Shaddad graduated with an honors degree in literature from the University of Khartoum and also a master's degree from the same university. After that, Shaddad obtained PhD from the University of London in 1970. He was a Professor of Philosophy at the University of Khartoum, and head of the department.

== Football career ==
=== Journalism ===
Shaddad started his football career as a player for the Abu Anja team, Omdurman, in the mid-fifties. He was unable to continue his football career for health reasons, so he moved to work in the field of sports journalism. Shaddad worked in the field of sports journalism in a number of newspapers, including al-Ayyam and al-Zaman (Times) newspapers. He headed the sports section of al-Sahafa and al-Rai al-Aam (The Public Opinion) newspapers. He also published al-Motafari (The Spectator) newspaper.

=== Sudan Olympic Committee ===
Shaddad was elected deputy secretary of the Sudanese Olympic Committee 1981 and 1982. He became the President of the Sudanese Olympic Committee between 1988 and 1997. He was also elected a member of the Executive Office of the Association of National Olympic Committees of Africa between 1989 and 1993, and a representative of the Olympic Committees in Zone 5, which used to include Sudan, Egypt, Ethiopia, Kenya, Uganda, Somalia and Tanzania.

Shaddad was selected as a member of the Football Committee for the 2012 Summer Olympics in London, and he was chosen as a member of the Court of Arbitration for Sport in Switzerland in 2003.

=== Sudan Football Association ===
Shaddad was elected as a secretary and then head of the Central Training Committee of the Sudanese Football Association between 1962 and 1967. He later became a coach and led many Sudanese clubs. He became the coach of the Sudan national football team between 1964 and 1967. At that time, Sudan won the silver medal in the 1965 Arab Games in Cairo after losing the gold medal to Egypt. Again, it won the gold medal in the Friendship Cup of the East African Zone in Khartoum in 1967. He was also able to lead the Al-Hilal Club team to reach the 1987 African Cup of Champions Clubs final for the first time in its history.

Shaddad began his administrative career in the Sudanese Football Association in November 1979 when he was elected a secretary for the Sudanese Football Association (SFA), until July 1982. During this period Sudan won for the first time the CECAFA Cup in 1980.

Shaddad became the President of the SFA from 1988 to 1992, and continued for a second term until 1995. He returned to the presidency of the Sudanese Federation after an absence that lasted for 6 years, during the period when Omar Al-Bakri Abu Haraz assumed the presidency of the SFA. Shaddad completed his career in leading the Sudanese football by returning again and leading the SFA in three consecutive sessions until 2010, after winning the elections of the Sudanese Football Association in 2001.

During his tenure, Al-Merrikh SC won the 1989 African Cup Winners' Cup, and he created the Sudan national under-17 football team in 1991. He also worked as a lecturer in the International Federation of Football and the African Confederation. During that time also, and according to the Sudanese football journalist Muzammil Abu Al-Qasim, due to personal disputes with Shaddad, Abdel Halim Mohamed (1910–2009), one of the founders of the Confederation of African Football and the founding president of the SFA, Shaddad chose not to honour him during his life or posthumously although he chose to honour his relative, Mubarak Shaddad.

On 25 July 2010, he declared that he would fight for his right to run for re-election despite being barred by a local football association and the federal commission. The commission cited a law stating that Shaddad cannot run for a third term without holding an international football position recognised by the sports ministry. Shaddad rejected the decision, threatened to involve FIFA, and criticised the excessive nomination fee. FIFA warned that Sudan could face suspension or expulsion if there was continued government interference. The Sudan Sports Commission defended its decision, claiming compliance with Sudanese and FIFA regulations. Political interference in football has led to sanctions in the past, with Nigeria, Kenya, and Guinea facing repercussions.

FIFA rejected the results of the 26 July 2010 which did not include Shaddad due to government interference. However, in August 2010, Shadad withdrew his nomination and his deputy Mutasim Jaafar Sarkhatm.

On 29 October 2017, Shaddad was elected as the president of the Sudan Football Association (SFA) for the 2017–2021 after securing 33 out of 62 votes, defeating the incumbent chairman Mutasim Jaafar, who received 28 votes. The voting process was closely monitored by CAF (Confederation of African Football) Executive Committee member Suleiman Hassan Waberi and FIFA Regional Development Manager David Fani. The SFA's membership was previously frozen due to government interference when the Sudanese Minister of Justice certified an election that was not approved by the FIFA. FIFA responded by giving the SFA an ultimatum to reverse the decision. When the decision was not overturned, FIFA suspended the SFA's activities. However, a month later, FIFA lifted the ban following an order from Prime Minister Bakri Hassan Saleh to cancel the Ministry of Justice's decision. The government's stance received criticism from Sudanese opposition parties, and the media was prohibited by the government from reporting.

Shaddad managed to hold onto his position despite his term having ended. He faced multiple FIFA Ethics complaints from his own SFA board. FIFA had previously agreed on a roadmap for elections with the SFA and the Al-Merrikh SC. Al -Merrikh, founded in 1908, holds a prominent position in Sudanese football politics, having won numerous league titles and cups. The club's president, Adam Sudacal, an ally of Shaddad, was seeking re-election and had received support from Shaddad. Election dates were scheduled and canceled, and when a stadium meeting was flooded, tensions escalated. Eventually, the club's general assembly took place at an alternative venue, with fans protesting outside against Shaddad and demanding change. State emergency police intervened, using tear gas and batons against the crowd.

Shaddad was finally removed from the office and Mutasim Jaafar Sarkhatm was elected on 13 November 2021.

== Personal life ==
Shaddad is married to Ibtisam Hassab Al-Rasoul, and they have a daughter, Amna Al-Rayyan.
