= Fadwa Taha =

Sudanese historian (born 1955)

Professor Fadwa Taha
- فدوى طه

President of the University of Khartoum
- In office 2019 – November 2021

Personal details
- Born: Fadwa Abd al-Rahman Ali Taha; 23 October 1955 (age 71) Arbaji, Sudan
- Education: University of Khartoum
- Alma mater: University of Khartoum.

Fadwa Abd al-Rahman Ali Taha (Arabic: فدوى عبد الرحمن علي طه; born 23 October 1955 in Arbaji, Gezira State, Sudan) is a Professor at the Department of History, University of Khartoum.

== Biography ==
=== Early life and education ===
Fadwa Abd al-Rahman Ali Taha was born in Arbaji, Gezira State, on 23 October 1955, and grew up there. She is an educated historian who obtained a Bachelor of Arts in 1979, a Master of Arts in 1982, and a PhD in 1987, all from the University of Khartoum. She later obtained a Master of Art in translation, in 2002, in addition to an honorary doctorate from the University of Bergen in Norway in 2004.

=== Career ===
Fadwa joined the University of Khartoum as a teaching assistant in 1979 and became a full lecturer in 1997. He rose to the rank of assistant professor in 1992, an associate professor in 2000, and a full professor in 2012. In 2010, she became the editor of the Journal of the Faculty of Arts at the University of Khartoum and was appointed as the head of the History Department. In 2007, she became the vice dean of the Faculty of Graduate Studies. She later moved to Saudi Arabia and in 2010 she was responsible for quality, research, and scientific studies at the College of Education in Hafr Al-Batin. She was appointed president of the University of Khartoum in October 2019.

Fadwa participated in the Sudanese Revolution in 2019, which brought down the regime of Omar al-Bashir. She also played a role in the discussions between the Forces of Freedom and Change and the Military Council, which replaced al-Bashir’s regime shortly after the coup. A National Transitional Sovereignty Council led the country in the transitional period until new elections were organized and an elected government was formed. After the two parties reached a common solution on 5 July 2019, she was invited to join the council but she declined.

She resigned in November 2021 in protest of the agreement to reinstate Abdalla Hamdok as Prime Minister after the 2021 Sudan coup d'état.

=== Personal life ===
Fadwa is married to Al-Miqdad Ahmed Ali and they have two children; Hatem, who studied at the School of Administrative Sciences, University of Khartoum, and Ezzat, who graduated from the Department of Electricity from the same university.
