= Gordon Memorial College =

Educational institution in Anglo-Egyptian Sudan

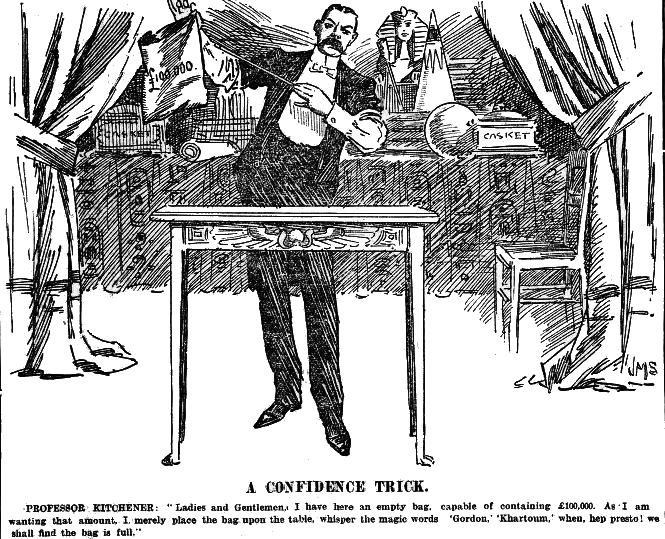
- Political cartoon of 1898 showing Kitchener's attempts to raise money for the college's founding.
- Sudan

Information
- Opened: 8 November 1902; 123 years ago

Gordon Memorial College was an educational institution in Anglo-Egyptian Sudan. It was built between 1899 and 1902 as part of Lord Kitchener's wide-ranging educational reforms.

Named for General Charles George Gordon of the British army, who was killed during the Mahdi uprising in 1885, it was officially opened on 8 November 1902 by Kitchener himself.

The first students at the school in 1903 were primary school students. In 1905 secondary education courses for future assistant engineers and land surveyors were added, and in 1906 a four-year course for training primary school teachers was started. By 1913 there were about 500 students in the college. In 1924 the college commenced vocational courses for Sharia, Engineering, Teachers' Training, Clerical Work, Accounting and Science. Post-secondary education courses in Science, Arts, Engineering, Veterinary Science and Law were started in 1938.

There were strong links between courses and Sudan government departments where it was anticipated students would work after graduation. At the beginning of 1945, all these schools were grouped together in a special arrangement with the University of London and secondary education was moved elsewhere. In 1948 there were 262 students at the college.

In 1951, Gordon Memorial College was merged with the Kitchener School of Medicine (founded in 1924) and renamed University College Khartoum with the University of London setting the examinations and awarding the degrees. . In 1956, the University College became the fully independent University of Khartoum.[2] The University of Khartoum claims to be the oldest university in Sudan based on the founding of the Gordon Memorial College in 1902.[3] The college's library and archival collections formed the foundation of the University of khartoum library, which continues to preserve its historical heritage.

The college provided high class education to its students, who were drawn from all backgrounds of Sudanese youth, enabling them to gain the sort of education previously only available in European or American universities.

== Graduates of Memorial College ==
Many of the Sudan's Prime Ministers and generals, including Mohamed Ahmed Mahjoob, Sirr Al-Khatim Al-Khalifa, Babiker Awadalla and Ibrahim Abood Ahmed, studied there.

Ismail al-Azhari, the first prime minister of Sudan, studied at the Gordon Memorial college but graduated from the American University of Beirut.

Palestinian scholar Ihsan Abbas also began teaching at the College and continued on after it became known as the University of Khartoum.
