= Muhammad Ahmad Mahgoub =

Statesman, poet amd Prime Minister of Sudan (1965–1966, 1967–1969)

Muhammad Ahmed al-Mahgub
- محمد أحمد المحجوب
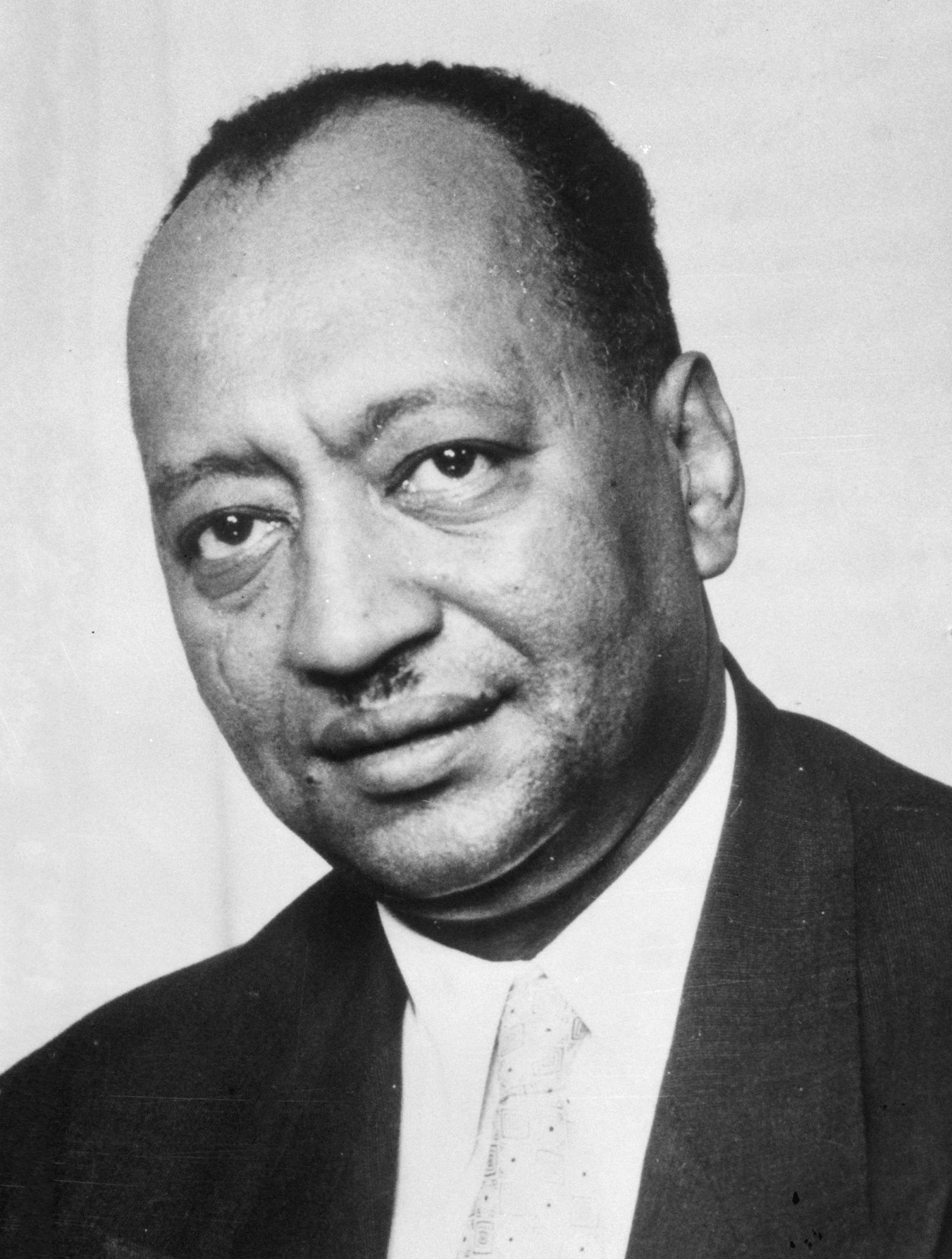
- Mahgoub in 1965

5th Prime Minister of Sudan
- In office 10 June 1965 – 25 July 1966
- President: Ismail al-Azhari
- Preceded by: Sirr Al-Khatim Al-Khalifa
- Succeeded by: Sadiq al-Mahdi
- In office 18 May 1967 – 25 May 1969
- President: Ismail al-Azhari
- Preceded by: Sadiq al-Mahdi
- Succeeded by: Babiker Awadalla

Foreign Minister of Sudan
- In office 1956–1958
- Preceded by: Mubarak Zarouk
- Succeeded by: Sayed Ahmad Keir
- In office 1964–1965
- Preceded by: Sayed Ahmad Keir
- Succeeded by: Muhammad Ibrahim Khalil
- In office 1967–1968
- Preceded by: Ibrahim al-Mufti
- Succeeded by: Ali Abdel Rahman al-Amin

Personal details
- Born: 17 May 1908 Ed Dueim, Anglo-Egyptian Sudan
- Died: 22 June 1976 (aged 68) Khartoum, Sudan
- Party: National Umma Party

Mohammed Ahmed Mahgoub (Arabic: محمد أحمد المحجوب, romanized: Muḥammad Aḥmad al-Maḥjūb; 17 May 1908 – 22 June 1976) was a Sudanese statesman, jurist, engineer, political activist, poet, author and literary critic who served as Sudan's first Foreign Minister at independence, then again after the October 1964 revolution, and twice as the 5th Prime Minister of Sudan. He was born into a family of scholars, writers and politicians: his grandfather was a Mahdist prince and military leader. He held degrees in architectural engineering and law, practiced both professions, and served as a judge.

He was at the centre of most of the principal upheavals in the Middle East, such as the Suez Crisis of 1956 and the Six-Day War in 1967, as well as many of the turbulent events in emergent Africa. He has also personally been through a range of vicissitudes unusual even in the stormy atmosphere of Arab-African politics… He was a pioneer of Sudan's independence from Anglo-Egyptian Condominium rule on January 1, 1956; became Foreign Minister in July 1956; was ousted in the first Sudanese Army coup led by General Ibrahim Abboud in November 1958; became a leader of the 1964 revolution which threw out the Army junta; returned as Foreign Minister and later, between June 1965 and July 1966, and again between May 1967 and May 1969, was Prime Minister. In May 1969 came the second Army coup led by Colonel Jaafar al-Nimairi which overthrew the civilian government of Mahgoub.

— Democracy on Trial, jacket flap

Mahgoub headed a Sudanese delegation to a United Nations meeting in 1947, before Sudan gained independence, and led the first Sudanese delegation to the General Assembly in 1956 following independence.

Just twenty days after his appointment as Foreign Minister in July 1956, Gamal Abdel Nasser of Egypt nationalised the Suez Canal, plunging the region into crisis. During the 1958 Lebanon crisis, Mahgoub was selected to present a joint Arab resolution to the United Nations General Assembly on behalf of ten Arab states—Iraq, Jordan, Lebanon, Libya, Morocco, Saudi Arabia, Sudan, Tunisia, the United Arab Republic, and Yemen. The resolution called for the withdrawal of foreign troops from Lebanon and Jordan and affirmed the principles of non-intervention, territorial integrity, and sovereignty; it was unanimously adopted by the General Assembly.

Later that year in September, the Arab League declined to endorse Lebanon's nomination of Foreign Minister Charles Malik for president of the General Assembly and instead selected Mahgoub as its candidate, describing him as having gained "international prominence" from presenting the Arab Resolution at the Emergency Session. The decision came as Malik and President Camille Chamoun were preparing to leave office in Lebanon. Mahgoub ultimately lost the election to Malik by eleven votes, in a campaign during which US Secretary of State John Foster Dulles personally travelled from Washington to New York to lobby against him and threatened to cut aid to Latin American states whose delegates voted for Mahgoub.

In November 1958, the conservative coalition parties, Umma and National Union, had just agreed privately to name Mahgoub Prime Minister when General Ibrahim Abboud staged his takeover, and instead of heading a Cabinet, Mahgoub was interned for 202 days in a barbed-wire military camp in Juba, near the Equator, cut off from the world with only censored letters to his family.

What is known in Sudan as the October Revolution broke out on October 21, 1964 against a junta led by Major General Ibrahim Abboud, overthrowing the regime in a bloodless coup d'état. The Abboud regime was followed by a provisional government until parliamentary elections in April 1965 led to a coalition government under Prime Minister Mahjoub.

Returning as Prime Minister on 18 May 1967, less than three weeks later the Six-Day War began; that same year he personally brokered an end to the five-year Yemen War, bringing President Nasser of Egypt and King Faisal of Saudi Arabia together at his own home in Khartoum to conclude the peace agreement.

Following the second military coup in 1969, he endured 173 days of house arrest before going into exile in London, where he wrote his memoir Democracy on Trial (1974). Of the two experiences he wrote: "House arrest is the worst form of punishment... Being under house arrest is the apex of frustration to a politician. It imposes mental as well as physical loneliness." In his isolation, he wrote, "my books were my only companions."

A committed democrat and prolific Arabic-language poet, he was also co-founder of one of Sudan's most important literary journals with his cousin, Abdel Halim Mohamed, who was a pioneering physician and the first Sudanese member and Fellow of the Royal College of Physicians in London. Beyond his medical career, Abdel Halim was a founding member and president of the Confederation of African Football (CAF), president of the Sudan Football Association and the Sudan Olympic Committee, an honorary life member of the International Olympic Committee, and a member of the FIFA Executive Committee and chief of the Medical Committee.

Mahgoub was profiled by Time magazine in 1965 and the New York Times in 1967; when he suffered a cerebral stroke in November 1968 while serving as Prime Minister, President Lyndon B. Johnson dispatched a specialist by special aircraft to London to attend him.

== Early Life and Education ==
Mohammed Ahmed Mahgoub was born in the city of Ed Dueim on the White Nile on 17 May 1908 into the 'Hashmab' family, a family of scholars, writers and politicians described as having a pedigree equal to many of the gentry. After early schooling in Ed Dueim, Mahgoub moved to Omdurman at age 7 under the care of his maternal uncle, Muhammad Abdul-Halim Musaad Hashim — the father of Dr. Abdel Halim Mohamed — where he attended Omdurman Intermediate School. He went on to Gordon Memorial College (later the University of Khartoum), graduating as an engineer in 1929. In 1936 he left engineering to enroll in law school, graduating in 1938. He then joined the Sudanese judiciary, serving until 1946 when he left to practice law privately and enter the struggle for independence..

His maternal grandfather, Emir Abdul-Halim Musaad Hashim, was a Mahdist prince and military leader who played a decisive role in the defeat of an Egyptian army led by William Hicks at the Battle of Shaykan in 1883 and in the Siege of Khartoum in 1885, before his death at the Battle of Toski on 3 August 1889. Mahgoub wrote that he was "born into a family which not only knew the bitter resentment of foreign rule but actually fought the invaders," and that his generation "grew up on stories of the glory and heroism of our own forces and the ordinary people who helped them.".

His mother bore a physical imprint of this history: as a two-year-old she was carried on the battlefield by his grandmother alongside his grandfather when a bullet grazed his grandmother's shoulder and sliced off half his mother's ear.

== Literary Career and the Al Fajr Movement ==
Mahgoub's earliest literary contributions appeared in The Civilization of Sudan and Al-Nahda Magazine before he became a co-founder of the movement credited with leading the cultural and intellectual struggle for independence from both Britain and Egypt.

After the 1924 revolution, with his cousin Abdel Halim Mohamed, Mahgoub co-founded the 'Hashmab society', which advocated for education and enlightenment in Sudan. At the end of the 1920s, the society evolved to become the 'Al Fajr' (the Dawn, Arabic: الفجر) society, which established its magazine in 1934 committed to Sudanese folklore, culture and nationalist movements. Abdel Halim regularly contributed to Al Fajr magazine under a pen name. Together they co-wrote Death of a World (Mawt Dunia, 1946), a collection of short stories that advocated personal sacrifice for the national cause. In the introduction to the book, Mahgoub and Abdel Halim wrote:

تجمّع رأينا على إصدار مجلة نصف شهرية تخدم الآداب والفنون، واخترنا لها اسم 'الفجر'، ذلك لأننا مؤمنون بأنه فجر صادق سرعان ما يتلوه الصبح... ومضينا لا يفلّ النقد عزمنا ولا يغرينا الثناء. وأخذت كبريات الصحف المصرية تنقل عن مجلّتنا المقالات الأدبية والقصص... لقد كانت حرباً عاتية بين الرجعية الفكرية والفكر الحر... وما صدر عدد من أعداد 'الفجر' إلّا وأعقبته ضجّة في دُور الحكومة وفي المجتمع، فالحكومة غير راضية عن اتّجاهاتنا، ضائقة ذرعاً بما نوجّهه"من نقد سياساتها، والمجتمع شاك في أمرنا لأنه لم يتعوّد مثل تلك الصراحة في النقد ومجاب الحاكمين

Translation: "Our opinion gathered on issuing a fortnightly magazine that serves literature and the arts, and we chose for it the name 'Al-Fajr' because we believe that it is an honest dawn that will soon be followed by the morning... and we keep walking, neither criticism faltered our resolve, nor tempted us with praise.

Major Egyptian newspapers began to quote literary articles and stories from our magazine... It was a fierce war between intellectual reaction and free thought... and when an issue of 'Al-Fajr' was published, it was followed by an uproar in the government and society. The government is not satisfied with our directions, fed up with our criticism of its policies, and society is suspicious of us because it is not accustomed to such frankness in criticism and confrontation with the rulers."|Mohammed Ahmad Mahgoub and Abdel Halim Mohamed, Death of a World (موت دنيا)

The society's political vision was distinctive: complete independence from both Britain and Egypt, rejecting both tribalism and pro-Egyptian unionist policies, and influenced by Western philosophical ideas.Al-Fajr magazine played a direct role in the founding of the Graduates' General Congress (GGC), the principal nationalist organization of the pre-independence era: it published the 1937 lecture by Ahmed Khair that first proposed a unified graduates' conference, helping catalyse the formation of the GGC in 1938. Mahgoub himself was a founder and leader of the GGC.

Mahgoub was one of the leading literary spokesmen for the idea of a distinctly Sudanese literary identity. The Sudanese poet and critic Mohammed Abdul-Hayy wrote that Mahgoub expressed the concept of a Sudanese literature "written in Arabic, but infused with the idiom of our land, because this (idiom) is what distinguishes a literature of one nation from another."

== Early Political Career and Struggle for Independence ==
Mahgoub published his first political essay, The Intellectual Movement in Sudan: Where Is It Heading?, in 1941, and Local Government in Sudan in 1945. He began his formal political career in 1946, leaving the judiciary that year to practice law and entering politics through the Umma Party which he was not fully aligned with, but was most acceptable. In 1947 he was elected to the Legislative Assembly but resigned his seat when a resolution he introduced — calling for Sudanese self-government by 1956 — was defeated. Sudan became independent in 1956.

When Britain and Egypt concluded a draft agreement in 1946 recognising Egyptian sovereignty over Sudan, Mahgoub led a Sudanese delegation to fight it both in London and at the United Nations. Of his overall role in the independence movement he wrote: "As a lawyer and a nationalist, I had a major role in the gradual phases of political struggle to independence. My reward came when I helped to hoist the flag of free Sudan on January 1, 1956." Following independence he became leader of the Opposition before returning to government.

== Foreign Minister at Independence (1956–1958) ==
After independence, Mahgoub served as Sudan's first Foreign Minister from July 1956, and led Sudan's first delegation to the United Nations.

Just twenty days after his appointment as Foreign Minister, Nasser nationalised the Suez Canal, plunging the region into crisis. Mahgoub later wrote: "Like many other Arab politicians, I was caught in the storm that raged round Nasser's decision. Militarily, we could do little to help Egypt... but morally we supported Nasser and I used all my lawyer's training and knowledge to uphold the legality of the nationalisation."

He had been privately agreed upon by the Umma and National Union coalition parties as their choice for Prime Minister when, in November 1958, General Ibrahim Abboud staged a military coup. Instead of heading a Cabinet, Mahgoub was interned for 202 days in a military camp in Juba town, near the Equator, encircled by barbed wire and guarded by heavily armed soldiers. Cut off from the outside world without newspapers or a radio, he and his fellow interned politicians were permitted to write one censored letter a month to their families.

== The 1958 UN Emergency Session and General Assembly ==
In July 1958 a coup in Iraq swept away the Hashemite monarchy and the government of Prime Minister Nuri es-Said, whose body was dragged through the streets of Baghdad. The United States landed Marines in Lebanon and Britain sent troops to Jordan, causing uproar across the Arab world. A special Emergency Session of the United Nations General Assembly was called.

That morning Mahgoub was summoned to the Waldorf Astoria Towers to meet the American Secretary of State, John Foster Dulles. Dulles asked that the Arab states drop their resolution and instead back a Western-backed resolution submitted by Canada and others. Mahgoub refused, telling him that since it was an Arab dispute, the Arabs were more competent to find a satisfactory resolution than others. Dulles then took a volume from his bookshelf and read out a passage on international Communism, telling Mahgoub: "You are a small nation, and you need the help of the big nations." Mahgoub replied: "Mr Secretary of State, may I remind you that sometimes the big states need the help of the smaller states. As to what you read about international Communism, let me remind you that I know enough about Communism, both in theory and in practice. Thank you." And he left.

When the Assembly met that afternoon, the ten Arab states — Iraq, Jordan, Lebanon, Libya, Morocco, Saudi Arabia, Sudan, Tunisia, the UAR and Yemen — asked Mahgoub to introduce their resolution on their collective behalf. The Arab Resolution was adopted unanimously — including, notably, by the United States itself. John Foster Dulles, who had summoned Mahgoub to the Waldorf Astoria that very morning to persuade him not to submit an Arab resolution, rose in the Assembly that afternoon to announce that "the United States...supports the Arab draft resolution." Reflecting on the episode, Mahgoub wrote: "When I look back, I find it hard to see what John Foster Dulles hoped to gain by trying to persuade us not to put forward an Arab Resolution."

Later that year at the UN's regular session for 1958, there were two candidates for the Presidency of the General Assembly: Lebanon's Charles Malik, backed by the United States, and Mahgoub, nominated by the Arab states. Mahgoub had not been particularly anxious to stand, but after considerable argument the Arab states persuaded him to accept. The Soviet bloc, who had contemplated putting forward their own candidate, withdrew him to give Mahgoub a clear field. The Arab states chose Mahgoub for his political and legal experience and above all for Sudan's neutral stand in inter-Arab affairs. John Foster Dulles backed Charles Malik because of Malik's cordial relations with Washington — Malik had supported the Eisenhower Doctrine while Mahgoub and most Arab statesmen had declared themselves against it, and Malik had been Foreign Minister of Lebanon during the recent American military intervention there.

As canvassing intensified and the majority of delegates appeared to be swinging toward Mahgoub, Dulles travelled personally from Washington to New York to add his weight to the Malik lobby. He went so far as to cable the presidents of the various Latin American republics and threaten their UN delegates that if they did not vote for Dr Malik, the United States would stop aid to their countries.

On Tuesday, September 16, ten minutes before the delegations were due to enter the hall of the General Assembly, Dulles stopped Mahgoub at the entrance. "I am sorry we cannot back you, but we gave our word to Dr Malik long ago," he said. With delegates and press within earshot, Mahgoub replied: "Thank you, Mr Secretary of State. I can understand that you give him your vote because you gave your word. But I cannot understand you lobbying for him and blackmailing the Latin-American delegates. Let me tell you that I am quite used both to defeat and to success; and to me defeat is the first step towards success. But my country will never forgive you for these methods, and will always look upon you with contempt."

Charles Malik was elected President, winning by eleven votes. Immediately after the result was declared, Mahgoub walked up to Malik, congratulated him and shook his hand. The photograph of the two men shaking hands was subsequently turned into a United Nations postage stamp. In his speech congratulating Malik, Dulles, along with Britain's Selwyn Lloyd, went out of his way to pay Mahgoub a handsome tribute.

During the same session the Sudanese delegation vigorously opposed South Africa's attempt to amend the UN Charter to deprive smaller states of equal voting rights, asserting that all states were entitled to equal enjoyment of the rights and privileges conferred by UN membership. The South African move was thrown out.

Mahgoub later reflected: "After such a strenuously eventful session, I returned to the Sudan, to face a coup d'état staged on November 17, 1958 — and I was out of office. For six years, I was therefore absent from the United Nations."

== Return and Second Term as Foreign Minister (1964–1965) ==
General Abboud's military government was overthrown by the popular October 1964 Revolution, in which Mahgoub was a leading figure. He returned as Foreign Minister for a second time, serving from 1964 to 1965.

== First Term as Prime Minister (1965–1966) ==
In the 1965 elections the Umma Party formed a coalition with the National Unionist Party. As Umma leader and a figure acceptable to all sides of the coalition, Mahgoub became Prime Minister on 10 June 1965. Within his first week in office, Mahgoub succeeded in finding southerners to fill three Cabinet posts reserved for the south, with southern elections set as a next goal even as the ongoing insurgency made them difficult to hold. Speaking to Parliament upon taking office, he declared: "Our main duty is to face the great challenge of realizing security and stability, and pressing forward with the revival of democracy after six years of military oppression."

His governing philosophy was characteristically moderate: "I strive for the possible. I seek the compromise that everyone can accept, even though nobody may be particularly pleased. Often, compromise is the only road to progress." During his first term Mahgoub flew to Addis Ababa, Dar es Salaam and Nairobi in July–August 1965 to seek support from neighbouring African states in cutting off aid to the Anyanya rebels in the south. Mahgoub served as Prime Minister until July 1966. The civil war would not end until the Addis Ababa Agreement of 1972.

== Second Term as Prime Minister (Yemen Reconciliation)(1967–1969) ==
Mahgoub returned as Prime Minister on 18 May 1967. Less than three weeks later the Six-Day War began. He later wrote that Sudan was "inextricably involved diplomatically, morally and to some extent militarily, in that disaster, a war which nobody wanted."

=== Yemen Reconciliation ===
Beginning in July 1967, after Arab leaders returned from an inconclusive United Nations General Assembly session following the Six-Day War, Mahgoub undertook a personal mediation effort to end the eight-year Yemen War between Egypt and Saudi Arabia. Nasser's negative attitude toward a peace plan had persisted for years, but the shattering defeat of the Six-Day War changed his calculus. The occasion came at the meeting of the Arab League Foreign Ministers in Khartoum in August 1967, where Egypt's own Foreign Minister Mahmoud Riad raised the Yemen dispute as "the most important element in inter-Arab relations."

On August 20, Mahgoub left for Jeddah. Upon arrival at the royal palace he was immediately handed a memorandum warning that King Faisal was not in the mood to discuss Yemen. Before his audience with the King, however, he was visited by Prince Abdullah, Faisal's son and a fellow poet, and a personal friend of Mahgoub's. When Mahgoub asked why Yemen should be taboo, Abdullah replied that his father had lost faith in any Egyptian agreement. Mahgoub implored him: "My dear Abdullah, things have changed, and our Arab nation is now passing through a critical period. Our destiny, our very existence, our heritage, history and culture — are all at stake." The Prince agreed to pave the way.

Mahgoub met King Faisal the following morning and found him adamant he wanted nothing to do with Nasser. Mahgoub told him: "I know you enjoy that quality of a noble Arab, who, when he finds his enemy wounded, will not kill him, but heal his enemy's wounds — and then offer him the choice of a duel or of coming to terms. Nasser is your brother, not your enemy." King Faisal looked at him for a moment, then passed him a notepad and pencil from his desk. Mahgoub scribbled the headings of a proposed agreement and passed it back. The King accepted them in principle.

Mahgoub flew to Cairo on August 23 where Nasser expressed misgivings. When Mahgoub urged him to attend the Khartoum Summit in person, Nasser hesitated: "Would you guarantee that if I go to the summit, Zakariya [Mohieddin, the Deputy President] will not stage a coup d'état during my absence?" Mahgoub replied he was sure Mohieddin would not dare. Nasser agreed to come, and on August 24 Mahgoub made a public statement in Cairo that both leaders had agreed to the Sudanese proposals.

Nasser and King Faisal arrived in Khartoum on August 29, 1967 for the Arab Summit Conference, flying half an hour apart, their separate motorcades merging into one through the cheering crowds of the city, who chanted: "To victory — Nasser and Faisal." After the public proceedings and a State Banquet at the Presidential Palace, it was Nasser himself who suggested that he and King Faisal go to Mahgoub's house that night to conclude the peace plan. Faisal arrived accompanied by his brother Prince Sultan, and Nasser by his Foreign Minister Mahmoud Riad. Guards were posted along the road from the Palace and all over the grounds, and the meeting got down to business, with the plan Mahgoub had scribbled on a notepad in the King's Jeddah office as its basis.

The deal was reached within two hours and fifteen minutes. Its terms provided for the formation of a three-state Arab committee to oversee the withdrawal of Egyptian troops from Yemen and the cessation of Saudi military assistance to the Royalists, with the final settlement of Yemen's political future left to the Yemeni people themselves. Three copies were signed by King Faisal and President Nasser; Mahgoub signed as witness, keeping the third copy in the safe of the Council of Ministers in Khartoum.

As a further consequence of the goodwill generated that night, King Faisal agreed at the Summit to contribute £50 million a year to help Egypt and Jordan recover from the Six-Day War — a contribution Mahgoub believed would not have been so readily forthcoming without the Yemen agreement.

The negotiations had been conducted in total secrecy. Mahgoub later noted that everything the press had written about them during the process "has been far off the mark" — and that he had found this "a great help." No sooner had Nasser and Faisal left his house than journalists flooded in; Mahgoub read out the agreement in Arabic while his son-in-law, Mohammed Khogali, translated it into English on the spot.

Nasser had promised Mahgoub that when the last Egyptian soldier returned home he would bestow the highest UAR honour upon him. Every soldier returned. No honour came. Mahgoub wrote: "The one award he did accord me was to be revealed only at a later date: at a meeting with some Sudanese, and with the aid of his agents in the Sudan, he helped engineer the military coup d'état against my Government on May 25, 1969."

The Yemen civil war finally ended in June 1970 when Republicans and Royalists implemented the framework Mahgoub had brokered in Khartoum three years earlier. He wrote: "The greatest reward I received was not Nasser's medals or honours but the fact that my plan for peace in Yemen was finally implemented by the Republicans and the Royalists in June 1970. The long civil war finally ended." Lord Caradon, in his introduction to Democracy on Trial, called the Yemen reconciliation "perhaps his finest achievement."

In November 1968, while still serving as Prime Minister, Mahgoub suffered a cerebral stroke and was taken to London for treatment. President Lyndon B. Johnson, then in the final weeks of his term in office, sent a specialist by special aircraft to London to attend him.

His second term ended on 25 May 1969, when Colonel Gaafar Nimeiry staged a coup d'état overthrowing Mahgoub's elected government. The night before the coup, Mahgoub's nephew, a brigadier, came to warn him that officers were plotting against the government. Mahgoub called in the army commander-in-chief, who promised to investigate and reported back that the information was unfounded. Only later did Mahgoub discover that the Director of Military Intelligence had been on holiday, and the false reassurance had come from his deputy — who was himself one of the plotters. When the coup struck, Mahgoub was informed that "apparently" there had been a coup. His reply: "Not 'apparently' but very definitely. I can see the soldiers around the house."

== Later Life and Democracy on Trial ==
Following the coup, Mahgoub endured 173 days of house arrest, confined within the walls of his home with all communication severed and his telephones disconnected, permitted visits only from immediate family or those who could obtain a permit from the Minister of the Interior. He described his sole solace as reading: "my books were my only companions." He subsequently went into self-exile in London from November 1969.

In 1974 he published Democracy on Trial: Reflections on Arab and African Politics (André Deutsch, London, 1974), a memoir and political essay covering Sudan's history from the Mahdist era through independence and the turbulent decades that followed. The book contained previously unpublished details of Arab conferences, traced attempts at Arab and African unity, and offered what the publisher described as the frankest appraisal of Nasser's impact by any Arab politician. The final chapter reflected on where the Arabs and the new Africans went wrong and how democracy could still be saved.

In the book Mahgoub set out his political philosophy directly: "I have always maintained that whenever democratic rule faces a crisis, the best solution is to give people more democracy and more freedom... Democracy, I still believe, is the only system of government that could function in what are hypocritically described the 'developing' countries."

Of military regimes he wrote: "All militarists, when they seize power with bullet or bayonet, assert that their aim is the eradication of greed and corruption... The present regime has been demonstrated to be a dismal example of savage brutality in crushing any form of opposition. It stays in power with hands stained with blood."

The book was introduced by Lord Caradon (Hugh Foot), former British Minister of State for Foreign Affairs and UK Permanent Representative to the United Nations, who had spent thirty years in the British Colonial Service. Caradon wrote that while he had been in the Middle East during Sudan's first moves toward independence, he did not know Mahgoub at that time except by reputation, and did not see him until much later when he looked across at the commanding figure of the Prime Minister of Sudan in the General Assembly of the United Nations.

Caradon described Mahgoub as "a leading and respected actor in the drama he describes" and called his account "invaluable." He described Mahgoub as "a straight-forward, vigorous, optimistic man who was beaten by events, but whose personality gives to the record the hope that what he strove for may yet succeed."

On Mahgoub's charge that the British administration fostered and encouraged separation in the South, Caradon wrote: "This is a grave charge which is, I fear, at least partly deserved."

The Times described Mahgoub as maintaining "an old-fashioned belief in democracy" — a phrase Mahgoub cited with quiet pride in the book's own pages. In the same review, Mahgoub's observation on British foreign policy was noted: "The British have no permanent friends or permanent enemies in politics — only permanent interests." Mahgoub returned to Sudan in 1976 and died in Khartoum on 22 June 1976.

== Personal Life ==
Mahgoub was generally regarded as sociable and hospitable, frequently hosting large gatherings, though contemporaries noted he occasionally exhibited a sarcastic demeanor He resided in a self-designed home considered modest for a government official. He played tennis and squash during his earlier years, but ceased participating in both sports upon returning to power following the 1964 October Revolution.

Despite his committed Arabism, he was widely regarded as friendly toward the West and the United States. He attended Arab and African summits and UN debates, often speaking for the Arab Bloc rather than Sudan alone, and was consulted by major regional leaders including Nasser, who after the Six-Day War asked for his frank assessment of Egypt. Mahgoub told him directly that "there was unrest and complete loss of direction."e

== Works ==
- The Intellectual Movement in Sudan: Where Is It Heading? (1941)
- Local Government in Sudan (1945)
- Death of a World (Mawt Dunia), co-authored with Dr. Abdel Halim Mohamed (1946)
- The Story of a Heart (1961)
- Heart and Experiences (1964)
- Paradise Lost (1969)
- Towards Tomorrow (1970)
- My Rosary and My World (1972)
- Democracy on Trial: Reflections on Arab and African Politics (André Deutsch, London, 1974; also published in Arabic)
- Al-Mahjoub: Stature and Meaning (1974)

Early contributions also appeared in The Civilization of Sudan and Al-Nahda Magazine, and as co-founder of Al-Fajr magazine (1934).
