= Sirr Al-Khatim Al-Khalifa =

Acting President of Sudan in 1964

- سر الختم الخليفة
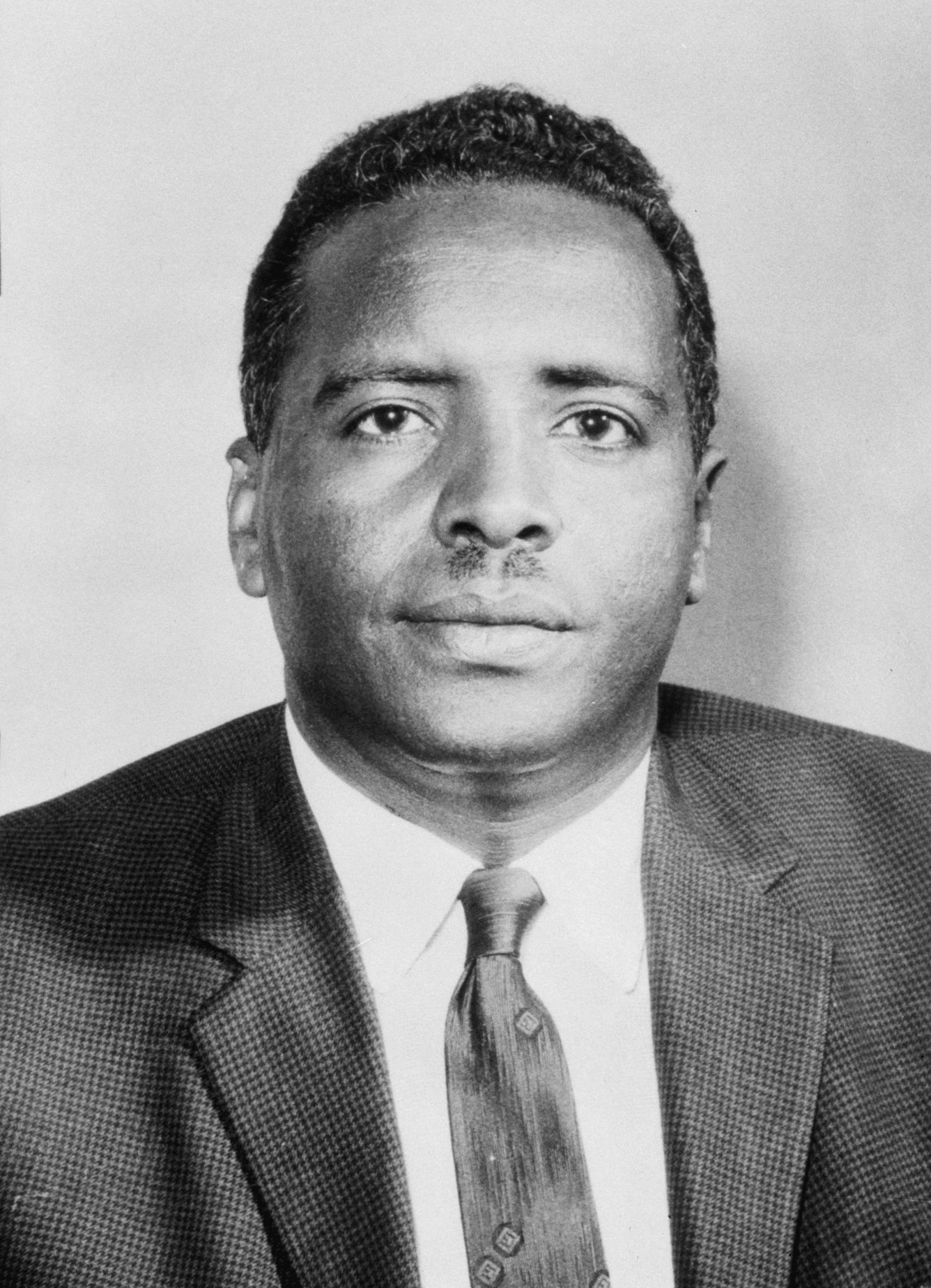
- Al-Khalifa in 1965

Minister of Education
- In office 1973–1975
- President: Gaafar Nimeiry
- Succeeded by: Mansour Khalid

4th Prime Minister of Sudan
- In office 30 October 1964 – 2 June 1965
- President: Sovereignty Council
- Preceded by: Ibrahim Abboud
- Succeeded by: Muhammad Ahmad Mahgoub

President of Sudan
- Acting
- In office 16 November 1964 – 3 December 1964
- Preceded by: Ibrahim Abboud
- Succeeded by: Sovereignty Council

Personal details
- Born: 1 January 1919 Ed Dueim, Anglo-Egyptian Sudan
- Died: 18 February 2006 (aged 87)
- Party: Independent
- Education: Exeter College, Oxford; University of Khartoum

Military service
- Battles/wars: First Sudanese Civil War

Sirr Al-Khatim Al-Khalifa Al-Hassan (Arabic: سر الختم الخليفة الحسن, romanized: Sirr al-Khatim al-Khalīfa al-Ḥasan; 1 January 1919 – 18 February 2006) was a Sudanese politician, ambassador and an elite educator, who served as the 4th Prime Minister of Sudan. He was famous for his great legacy in education and founding prints for Ministry of Education in Sudan, and as the executive Prime Minister in the October Regime. Al-Khalifa had a socialist orientation and was therefore sympathetic to the Simba, who had embraced communism.

== Early life and education ==
Al-Khalifa was born in Ed Dueim to Al-Khalifa Hassan Ahmed and Nafisa Al-Fakki Alabead. Descending from the Ja'alin tribe, his father migrated from Shendi to Ed Dueim and was appointed khalifa of the Khatmiyya Sufi order.

In the early 1920s he attained his primary education at Ed Dueim Rural School and Berber Intermediate School. In 1937 he graduated from Gordon Memorial College studying Teachers Education. Al-Khalifa became a teacher at Bakht Arrida in 1938 and worked there until 1944 when he moved to Great Britain to continue his education.

In 1944 Al-Khalifa furthered his education by attending Exeter College, University of Oxford. In 1946 he returned to Sudan to resume his teaching job at Bakht Arrida.

== Trip to southern Sudan ==
In 1950, after the abandonment of the Southern Policy, a colonial policy that isolated southern Sudan from education and economic development, Al-Khalifa was appointed a Provincial Education Officer at Equatoria Province in Juba. After seven years of success at the job, he was promoted to become Assistant Director of Education for Southern Provinces, the highest educational position in the region. During this time, he increased the number of schools and introduced Arabic to the region. Spending 10 years in southern Sudan, spreading education and relating to the once-totally-closed south, he became a very favorable and respected character in the whole of Sudan.

== Return to northern Sudan ==
In 1962, Al-Khalifa was appointed a dean of Khartoum Technical Institute (now Sudan University of Science and Technology). He spent two years at the job, and was nicknamed "Father of Technical Education" in Sudan, since he devoted great effort and time for this newly established technical school.

== 1964 Revolution and political career debut ==
In 1964, the Abbud regime was facing numerous instabilities that led to a major strike from the different working sectors of society. The strike, known as the October Revolution, led to rioting and numerous deaths and forced President Abbud to dissolve the government and prepare for civilian rule.

Al-Khalifa was nominated by the Umma Party as prime minister for a transitional government to prepare for civilian rule. Many agreed upon the nominee, others including the Sudanese Communist Party (SCP) strongly disagreed due to his political inexperience with their nominees including Abdin Ismail and Jaafar Karrar. After several meetings between the different parties, Al-Khalifa was appointed prime minister for the transitional government.

The Al-Khalifa regime was very eager to address, tackle and find peaceful solutions to the southern problem. With party members holding few positions, southern politicians were allowed positions that were historically only held by northerners. Clement Mboro became the first southern to hold the position of Minister of Interior.

== 1965 Round Table Conference ==
Al-Khalifa called upon establishing the Round Table Conference with the presence of 24 southern politicians and 18 northern party representatives to address the problem of the south. The conference was originally scheduled in Juba between 16–29 March 1965; however, several burnings and rampages in Juba signaled the migration of the conference to Khartoum.

"Gentlemen, Arabism, which is a basic attribute of the majority of the population of this country and of many African countries besides, is not a racial concept which unites members of a certain racial group. It is a religious, cultural and nonracial link that binds together numerous races, black, white and brown. Had Arabism been anything else but this, most modern Arabs, whether African or Asian, including the entire population of the Northern Sudan, would cease to be Arab at all."

— Muhammad Omar Bashir, The Southern Sudan: Background to Conflict (Khartoum University Press), p.168.

However, the conference reached a deadlock and was concluded with the establishment of Twelve-Men Committee, consisting of the participating political parties. Al-Khalifa was forced to resign and the government promised to schedule elections by June 1965. With a rushed elections conducted in the north excluding the south for security reasons, this ended the transitional government of Al-Khalifa and started the second democratic phase of Sudan under Mohamed Ahmed Mahjub.

== Diplomatic break from politics ==
Al-Khalifa was appointed ambassador to Italy in 1966. In March 1968, he was transferred to become ambassador to the United Kingdom. On 25 May 1969, when Gaafar Nimeiry seized power, Al-Khalifa was bluntly informed about his end of service and stripped of his diplomatic passport. He had to report immediately to Khartoum. Some believe that this blunt telex was a reply from Babiker Awadallah, former chief justice and the new prime minister, and Nimeiry’s regime to Al-Khalifa’s betrayal of the October Revolution by rushing the 1965 elections thus handing power to Umma-PDP parties. After performing the diplomatic farewell to Elizabeth II, Al-Khalifa returned to Khartoum in the beginning of June 1969.

== Later life ==
In 1973, Nimeiry appointed Al-Khalifa as Minister of Education. He assumed this position for two years, when he was appointed in 1982 as President Advisor on Educational Affairs until the end of Nimeiry’s era in 1985.

The day after his death, Al-Khalifa's burial at Al-Bakri Cemetery on 19 February 2006, was attended by thousands of his colleagues, politicians, educators and students.

== Trivia ==
- Succeeded by his son Hassan (named after his father), and four daughters Nafisa (named after his mother), Sulafa, Sara and Sawsan
- He inaugurated and was the first to pitch a ball in Al Merreikh Stadium in 1965.
- He was a fan of Ahmed Al-Mustafa, post Haqeeba singer
- He was one of the authors of the famous geography books in Sudan primary school syllabus, Sobol Kasb Al-ayash fe es Sudan, (Means of earning a living in Sudan). This book explored the different regions of Sudan, introducing the dialects and customs of each region.
