= Ismail al-Azhari =

President of Sudan from 1965 to 1969

- إسماعيل الأزهري
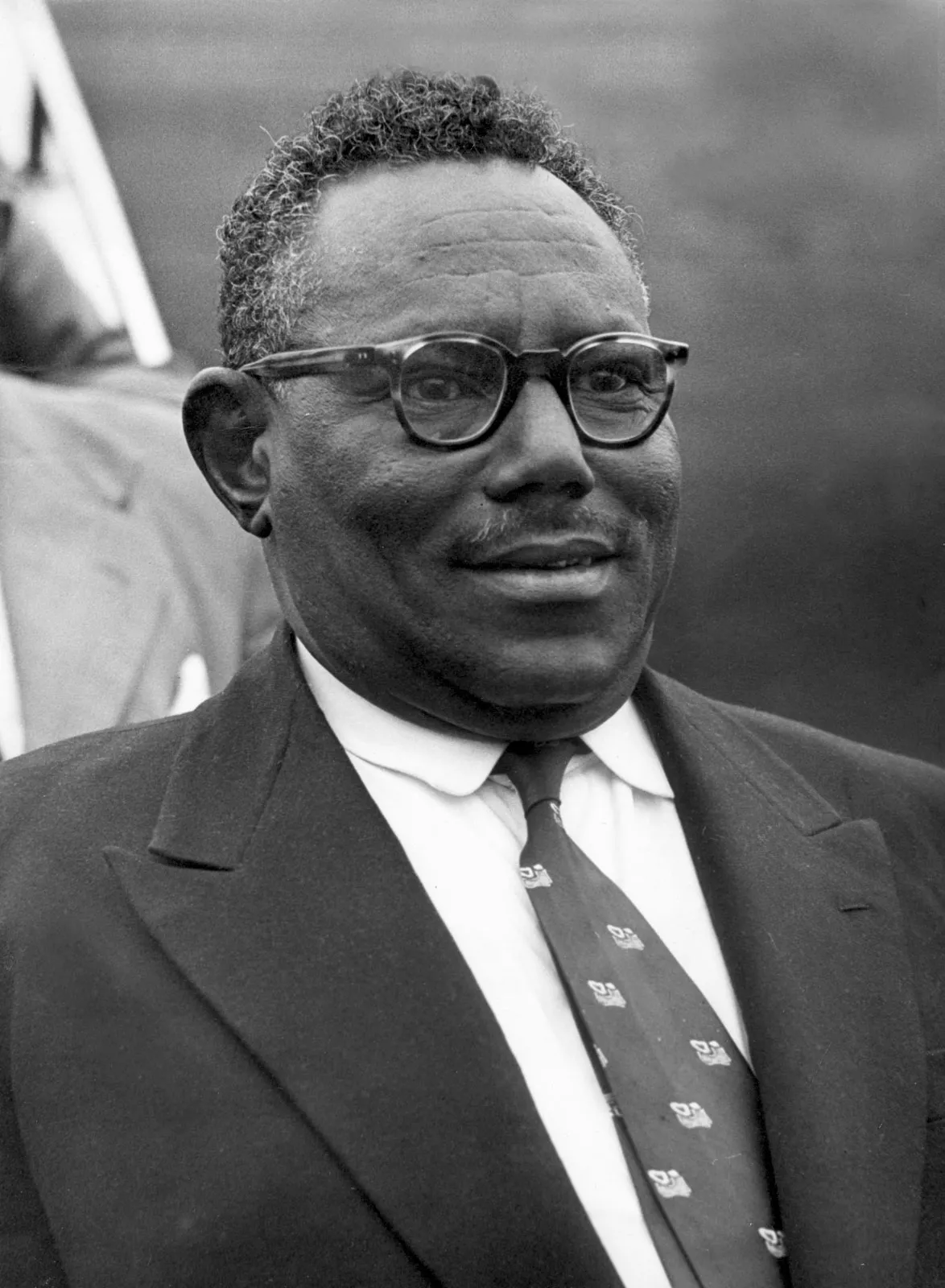
- Al-Azhari in 1969

Chairman of the Sovereignty Council
- In office 10 June 1965 – 25 May 1969 Co-leading with Sovereignty Council
- Preceded by: Sirr Al-Khatim Al-Khalifa (acting president)
- Succeeded by: Gaafar Nimeiry (Chairman of the National Revolutionary Command Council)

1st Prime Minister of Sudan
- In office 6 January 1954 – 5 July 1956
- Monarch: Elizabeth II (until 1956)
- Governor-General: Knox Helm (until 1956)
- Preceded by: Abd al-Rahman al-Mahdi (Chief Minister of Sudan)
- Succeeded by: Abdallah Khalil

Personal details
- Born: 20 October 1900 Omdurman, Anglo-Egyptian Sudan
- Died: 26 August 1969 (aged 68) Khartoum, Sudan
- Party: Democratic Unionist Party

Ismail al-Azhari (Arabic: إسماعيل الأزهري, romanized: ʼIsmāʻīl al-Azharī; October 20, 1900 – August 26, 1969) was a Sudanese nationalist and political figure. He served as the first Prime Minister of Sudan between 1954 and 1956, and as Head of State of Sudan from 1965 until he was overthrown by Gaafar Nimeiry in 1969.

He was president of the National Unionist Party (now the Democratic Unionist Party) when the unionist parties united under his leadership. In 1954 he was elected prime minister from within the parliament and under the influence of the growing sense of the need for independence of Sudan and before the union discussion with Egypt. With the support of the independent movement, he submitted the proposal to declare independence to parliament. He assumed the post of president of the Council of Sovereignty after the revolution of October 1964 during the second period of democracy. He was arrested during the May 1969 coup and imprisoned in Cooper prison and when his health declined, he was admitted to hospital, where he remained until his death.

== Early life ==
Ismail al-Azhari was born in Omdurman. The son of a religious notable, he received his early education in Wad Madani. He joined the Gordon College in 1917 but he did not complete his education there. He worked at Atbara and Omdurman primary schools, then he went on to study at the American University of Beirut and he returned there in 1930. He was appointed by the Gordon College and he founded the Association of Arts and Correspondence. When the Graduates Conference was established he was elected as Secretary-General in 1937. He led several parties and civil rights movements.

== Entry into politics ==
Al-Azhari and other educated Sudanese demanded greater participation in the administration of the country, and to promote their objectives they formed the Graduates' General Congress in 1938. Al-Azhari's election as secretary to the congress launched him into a career in politics.

Although the congress at first had no political aspirations, in 1942 it asserted its claim to act as the spokesman for all Sudanese nationalists. When the wartime British administration rejected this claim, the congress split into two groups: the moderates, who were prepared to work with the British toward full independence, and a more extreme group, led by al-Azhari, which distrusted the British and sought unity with Egypt in the post-colonial period.

== Political formation ==
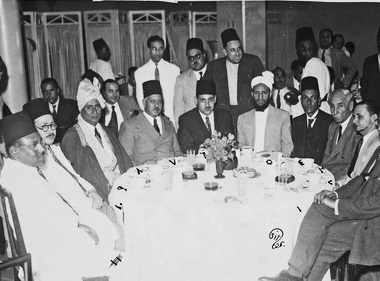
Azhari (seated first from left) with notable nationalist figures from across the Arab world, including Allal al-Fassi of Morocco (first from right) and Aziz Ali al-Misri of Egypt (second from right) in Cairo, 1946

In 1943 al-Azhari and his supporters from the congress formed the Ashiqqa (Brothers') party, the first true political party in the Sudan. His main support came from the Khatmiyya Sufi order, one of the two main Muslim groups in the country. When the more moderate nationalists formed the Umma Party in 1945, its principal support came from the chief rival of the Khatmiyya, the anti-Egyptian Mahdist sect.

Between 1944 and 1953 al-Azhari, as the leading advocate for uniting the Sudan with Egypt, fought tenaciously against any act which appeared to weaken the "unity of the Nile Valley". Thus, in 1948 he boycotted the elections to establish a legislative assembly in Sudan, and his propaganda and demonstrations led to his arrest and imprisonment for subversion in 1948–1949.

The Egyptian Revolution of 1952, which ended the regime of King Farouk I, dramatically changed the situation in Sudan. Farouk's government had exerted all its influence to unite Egypt and Sudan and block Sudanese independence. Egypt's new leaders, Muhammad Naguib, who was half-Sudanese, and later Gamal Abdel Nasser, were more willing to permit the Sudan to achieve independence.

On 12 February 1953, an agreement was reached between Egypt, Britain and the Sudanese, for a transition from condominium rule to self-government within three years, followed by an election to determine the future relationship between Egypt and Sudan. Although his imprisonment and the quarrels within his own party had for a time undermined al-Azhari's power and prestige, he was able to reunite his followers under the banner of the National Unionist Party (NUP) in time to campaign vigorously for the combined parliament and constitutional assembly which was to rule the Sudan for the next two years. Throughout the campaign al-Azhari emphasized his hostility to the British and his support for Egypt so that when the NUP won a victory in the elections of 1953, it was widely regarded as a victory for al-Azhari's efforts to link the Sudan to Egypt.

== Prime minister ==
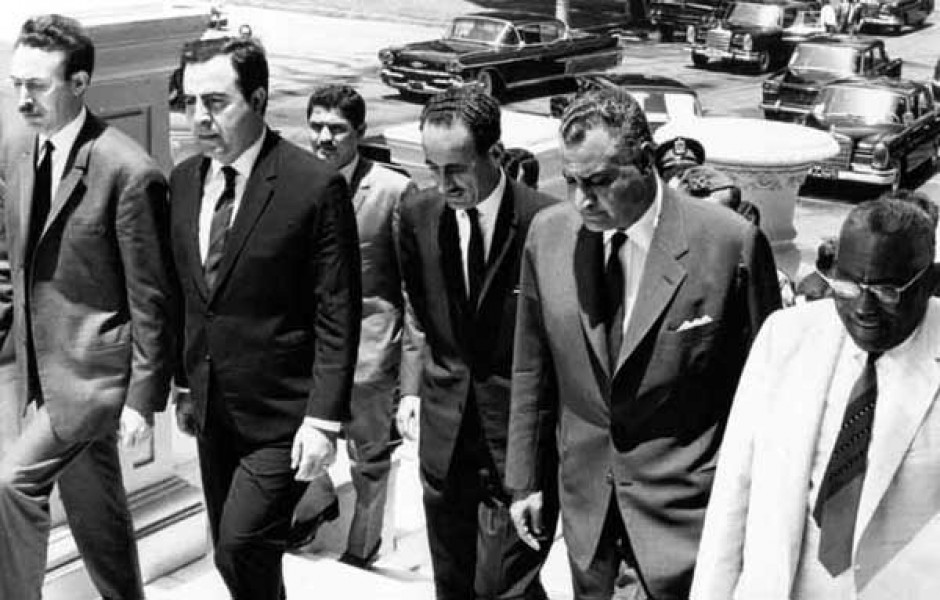
Cairo, 1968, from left to right the presidents Houari Boumediène of Algeria, Nurredin al-Atassi of Syria, Abdul Salam Arif of Iraq, Gamal Abdel Nasser of Egypt and al-Azhari

In 1954 al-Azhari became the Sudan's first prime minister. His government faced three major problems. The first was the critical constitutional question of Sudan's relationship with Egypt. It soon became clear that the Sudanese people did not want to be tied closely to Egypt, and in his greatest act of statesmanship al-Azhari dramatically reversed the position which he had long advocated and, with the support of the principal political leaders, declared Sudan independent on January 1, 1956.

Then al-Azhari was faced with the second problem, the task of organizing a permanent government. His principal opponent, the Umma Party, wanted a strong presidential system. Al-Azhari advocated for a British parliamentary form of government, but he never resolved the issue during his tenure and the problem remained into the 1970s.

The third problem which confronted al-Azhari's government was the uniting of the black, non-Muslim southern Sudanese with peoples and traditions very different if not opposed to the Arab, Muslim north. Neither by his background nor by his political convictions was al-Azhari sympathetic to the aspirations of the southern Sudanese, and he sought to control southern Sudan by a combination of military and police repression on the one hand and negotiations and discussion on the other. The failure of the policy became apparent in August 1955, when a mutiny in the Equatoria Corps precipitated disturbances throughout many of the districts in the south. Thereafter, relations between northern and southern Sudan remained the principal problem facing successive Sudanese governments. Their failure to meet southern aspirations undermined their authority, just as it had drained al-Azhari's political strength.

These and other problems began to weaken al-Azhari's coalition. His reversal on unity with Egypt undermined the political strength of the NUP by depriving it of its principal ideology. The mutiny in the south damaged al-Azhari's prestige. More importantly, the fragile alliance between the Khatmiyya sect and the NUP began to disintegrate, leaving the prime minister without the popular support he needed to rule effectively. As a result, he reformed his coalition into a "government of all talents" in February 1956, but then his former Khatmiyya supporters deserted to form the People's Democratic Party in June. In July he lost a vote of confidence in parliament and resigned.

== Later life ==
Al-Azhari opposed the government led by Abdullah Khalil, who replaced him, and also the succeeding military regime of Ibrahim Abboud. In 1961 al-Azhari was arrested and exiled to Juba in southern Sudan for several months.

In 1964 the military regime resigned in the face of student-led demonstrations, and party politics reemerged in Sudan. Al-Azhari sought to regain power, but without a strong political base even his skill as a politician was insufficient to lead a government in Sudan. In March 1965 he became President of Sudan, but this was primarily an honorary position with little real power. He remained president until May 1969, when a military coup d'état led by Col. Gaafar Nimeiry ended his political life.

Known as a skilled if not crafty politician, al-Azhari was respected and loved. His tenacity to survive the many vicissitudes of Sudanese political life was even admired. His most statesmanlike decision – not to press for unity with Egypt – destroyed the principles upon which his political life had been constructed, leaving only manipulation to achieve political power. He died on August 26, 1969.

== See also ==
- History of Sudan (1956–1969)
