= Ibrahim Abboud =

President of Sudan from 1958 to 1964

General Ibrahim Abboud
- إبراهيم عبود
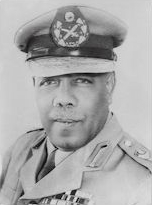
- Official portrait, 1958

1st President of Sudan
- In office 17 November 1958 – 16 November 1964
- Preceded by: Sovereignty Council
- Succeeded by: Sirr Al-Khatim Al-Khalifa (acting)

3rd Prime Minister of Sudan
- In office 18 November 1958 – 30 October 1964
- President: Himself
- Preceded by: Abdallah Khalil
- Succeeded by: Sirr Al-Khatim Al-Khalifa

Personal details
- Born: 26 October 1900 Suakin, Anglo-Egyptian Sudan
- Died: 8 September 1983 (aged 82) Khartoum, Democratic Republic of Sudan

Military service
- Allegiance: Egypt; Sudan
- Branch/service: Egyptian Army; Sudan Defence Force; Sudanese Army
- Years of service: 1918–1925 (Egypt); 1925–1956 (Egypt and UK); 1956–1964 (Sudan)
- Rank: General
- Battles/wars: Second World War; East African Campaign; Anglo-Iraqi War; North African Campaign; First Arab-Israeli War

Ibrahim Abboud (Arabic: إبراهيم عبود; 26 October 1900 – 8 September 1983) was a Sudanese military officer and political figure who served as the head of state of Sudan between 1958 and 1964 and as President of Sudan in 1964; however, he soon resigned, ending Sudan's first period of military rule. A career soldier, Abboud served in World War II in Egypt and Iraq. In 1949, Abboud became the deputy Commander in Chief of the Sudanese military. Upon independence, Abboud became the Commander in Chief of the Military of Sudan.

== Early life and early career ==
Ibrahim Abboud was born 26 October 1900 in Mohammed-Gol, near the old port city of Suakin on the Red Sea. He trained as an engineer at the Gordon Memorial College and at the Military College in Khartoum. He received a commission in the Egyptian Army in 1918 and transferred to the Sudan Defence Force in 1925, after its creation separate from the Egyptian army. During World War II he served in Eritrea, in Ethiopia, with the Sudan Defence Force, and with the British Army in North Africa. After the war, Abboud commanded the Camel Corps, and then rose rapidly to commander of the Sudan Defence Force in 1949 and assistant commander in chief in 1954. With the declaration of independence for the Sudan in 1956, he was made commander in chief of the Sudanese military forces. After the Sudanese army staged a coup d'état in November 1958, overthrowing the civilian government of Abdallah Khalil, Gen. Abboud led the new military government. Philip Agee alleged that CIA engineered the 1958 coup in In the Company.

Between 1956 and 1958, Sudanese nationalist leaders from both major parties sought to find solutions to the seemingly intractable problems of building a nation, developing the economy and creating a permanent constitution. Neither Ismail al-Azhari, leader of the Nationalist Unionist Party and the first Prime Minister of Sudan, nor his rival, Abdallah Khalil, the Umma party leader and successor to al-Azhari as prime minister, was able to overcome the weaknesses of the political system or to grapple with the country's problems. Parliamentary government was so discredited that Gen. Abboud, who formerly had remained studiously aloof from politics, led a coup d'état on 17 November 1958, to end, in his words, "the state of degeneration, chaos, and instability of the country." The Council of State and cabinet were dismissed, parliament and all political parties were declared dissolved, and the constitution was suspended.

== Chief of the Military Government ==
At first Abboud and his ruling Supreme Council of Twelve had the tacit support of the Sudanese politicians and people. The country was tired of the intrigues of the politicians and was prepared to permit the military to inaugurate an efficient and incorruptible administration. There was opposition only within the military in the first few months of the military government. This was the result of disagreements among the senior military leaders. But within a year many younger officers, and even cadets, rose to challenge Abboud's position. All of them were quickly suppressed.

== Abboud's Regime ==
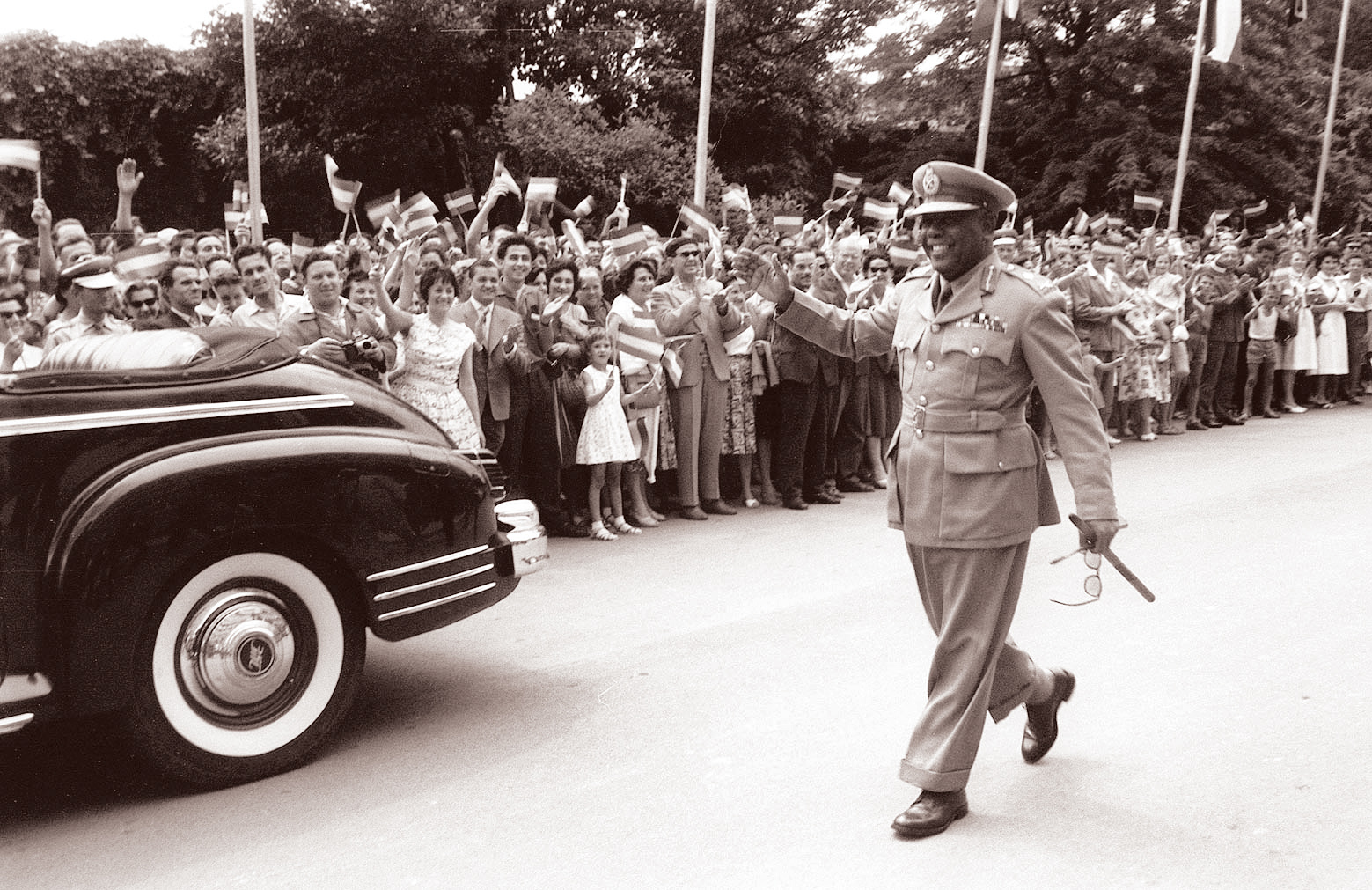
Ibrahim Abboud during his visit to Yugoslavia, July 1960

Abboud moved swiftly to deal with the Sudan's problems. The provisional constitution was suspended and all political parties dissolved. The price of Sudanese cotton was lowered, and the surplus from the crop of 1958 and the bumper crop of 1959 was sold, easing the financial crisis. An agreement was reached with Egypt concerning the division of the Nile waters, and although Sudan did not receive as great an allotment as many Sudanese thought equitable, Egypt recognized the independence of Sudan, and frontier conflicts ceased. Finally, in 1961, an ambitious 10-year development plan was launched, designed to end Sudan's dependence on cotton exports and many foreign manufactured imports.

Although Abboud dealt with the important economic problems and improved foreign relations, he made little attempt to capitalize on his successes to forge a political following outside the army. His political independence certainly enabled him to act decisively, but his actions frequently alienated large segments of the population, which his government ultimately needed to remain in power without resort to force. He sought to meet demands of the population for increased participation in government by instituting a system of local representative government and the "erection of a central council ... in a pyramid with the local councils as a base." The creation of such councils clearly shifted power to the rural areas, whose conservatism would counter complaints from the more liberal urban critics who were becoming increasingly frustrated by increasingly arbitrary administration.

== "Southern Problem" ==
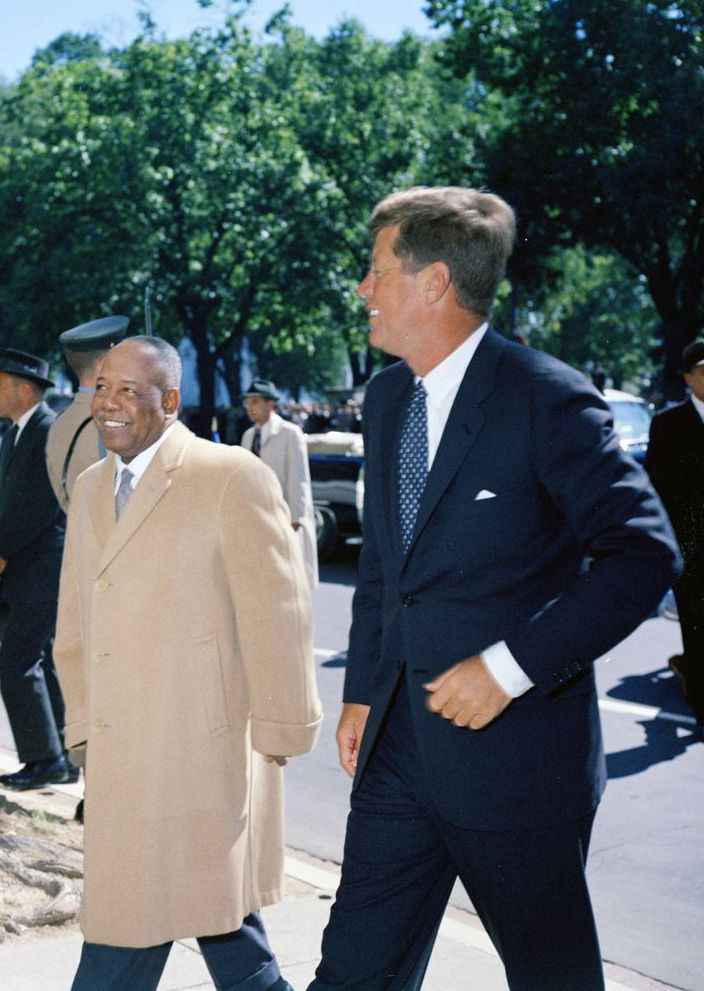
Ibrahim Abboud with President Kennedy at the White House, 1961

In spite of its weaknesses, Abboud's government might have lasted longer if not for the "southern problem." Abboud was personally popular or, at least, respected. He was even invited to the White House in 1961, where President John F. Kennedy praised Sudan for having set a good example for living in peace with its neighbours.

In non-Arab, non-Muslim southern Sudan, however, the arbitrary rule of the military government produced a more negative reaction than in the north. Thus, the government's vigorous program of Arabization and Islamization in the south provoked strikes in the schools and open revolt in the countryside. Opposition to the government was met by force, and many southerners fled as refugees into neighbouring countries. By 1963 the conflict had escalated to a civil war in which the northern troops held the towns while the southern guerrillas roamed the countryside. Abboud's forces were responsible for large numbers of deaths in Kodok, Yei and Maridi, and overall his government was responsible for the deaths of more Sudanese people than any other head of state until Omar al-Bashir. Finally, in August 1964, in a desperate attempt to find a solution to the enervating campaign in the south, Abboud established a 25-man commission to study the problem and make recommendations for its solution. When the commission, in turn, asked for public debate on the "southern question," the students of Khartoum University initiated a series of debates that soon turned into a forum for open criticism of all aspects of the administration. The government banned these debates, precipitating student demonstrations in which one student was killed. The situation rapidly deteriorated, and within two days the civil service and the transport workers were on strike. Demonstrations followed in the provinces. Rather than suppress the opposition by armed force and bloodshed, Abboud dissolved his government on 26 October 1964, and allowed the formation of a provisional cabinet under Sirr Al-Khatim Al-Khalifa to replace the Supreme Council. Abboud himself was forced to resign on 15 November in favor of a civilian provisional government, and he retreated into retirement, thus ending the Republic of the Sudan's first period of military rule.

Abboud lived in Britain for several years and died in Khartoum on 8 September 1983, at the age of 82.
