= Destruction of cultural heritage during the Sudanese civil war (2023–present) =

Cultural heritage site destruction during the Sudanese civil war

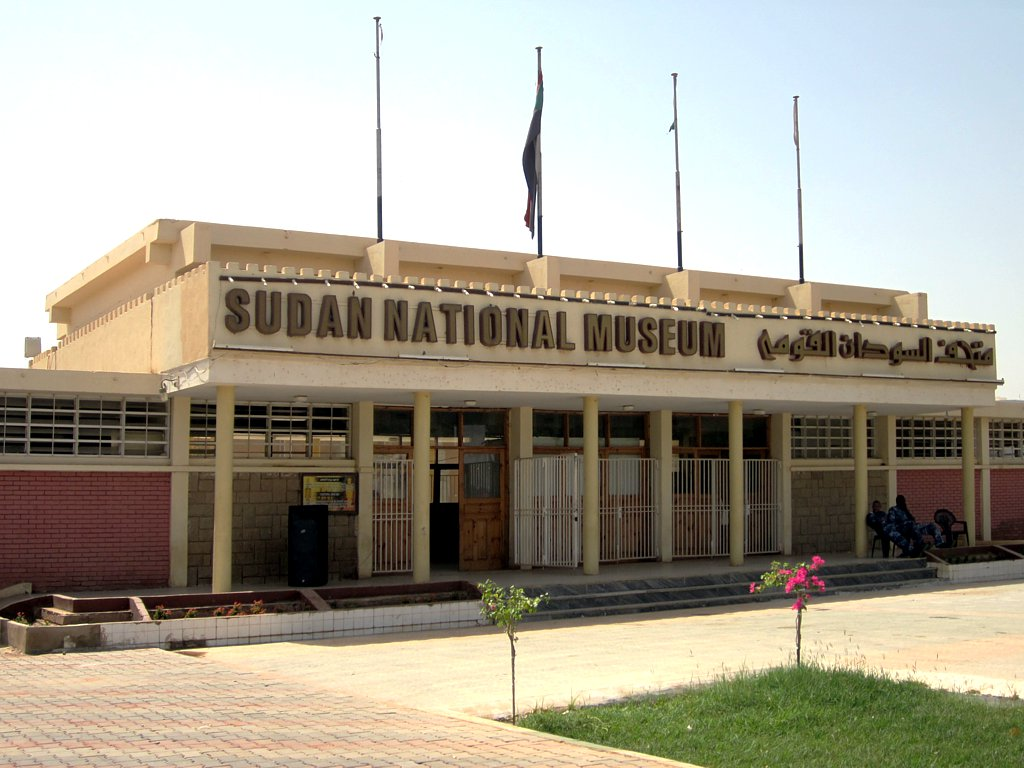
The National Museum of Sudan was looted during the civil war.

The Sudanese civil war has caused damage to or destroyed various cultural heritage sites. More than 20 museums have been damaged, with the cost exceeding $110 million. This includes the National Museum of Sudan which was looted by the Rapid Support Forces (RSF). Artefacts have been trafficked outside of the country.

== Background ==
Since the civil war broke out in 2023, many Sudanese citizens have been killed with estimates as high as 150,000 by mid 2024. Researchers and humanitarian agencies have limited access to data from Sudan, limiting the full picture of the conflict's impact.

== Impact ==
More than twenty museums in Sudan have sustained damage as a result of the conflict, with the financial impact estimated to be around $110 million as of September 2025.

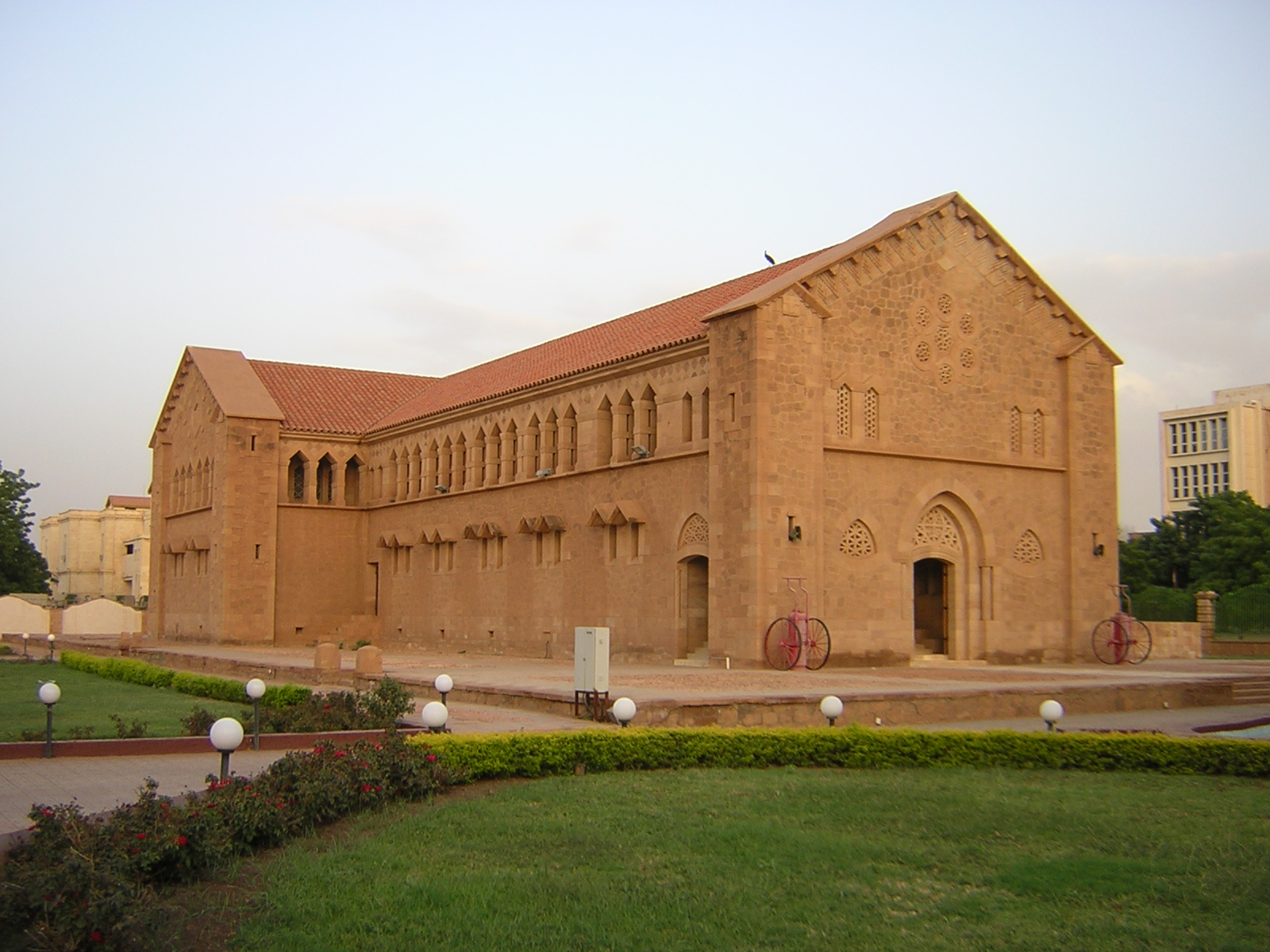
The Republican Palace (shown here in 2009) was damaged in May 2023.

In May 2023, the Republican Palace in Khartoum was damaged during fighting. The library of the Mohamed Omer Bashir Centre for Sudanese Studies at Omdurman Ahlia University was burned in May 2023. The library contained original documents related to Sudanese political and cultural history. The head of the centre suggested that it was targeted to harm the university.

Archaeologists, artists, museum workers and heritage advocates also raised concern over the status of the National Museum of Sudan, which was the scene of heavy fighting between the SAF and the Rapid Support Forces (RSF) and was taken over by the RSF on 2 June. Archaeologists monitoring the site noted fire damage on the building during the fighting. Video showed RSF soldiers in the museum and opening exhibits, and satellite images showed trucks leaving the museum loaded with its contents; the museum subsequently reported that tens of thousands of artefacts had been looted.

Other cultural institutions such as the Natural History Museum of Sudan and the Abdallah Khalil museum were also destroyed or looted during the conflict. The Khalifa House Museum and the Nyala Museum were also looted, and the museum in El Geneina was badly damaged.

Among the items that went missing from the Khalifa museum were the swords used by Osman Digna and Abd al-Rahman al-Nujoumi during the Mahdist War. The Geology Museum, the Military Museum and the Republican Palace were also destroyed, while the National Archives and the National Library sustained heavy damage. There were reports that the Ali Dinar Museum in Darfur was also destroyed.

In June 2023, the RSF posted a video showing the remains of purported victims of the regime of former president Omar al-Bashir, which turned out to have been that of mummies and human remains used as props from the M. Bolheim Bioarchaeology Laboratory in Khartoum, which were thought to date from 3300 to 3000 BCE.

Reports later emerged that some items from the National Museum's collection had been looted and taken to be sold in South Sudan. Ikhlas Abdel Latif, the head of museums at the Sudanese national antiquities authority, said that items stored in the museum had been taken by truck to western Sudan and border areas. The largest, most difficult to move items remained while portable objects were looted. Some of the items were subsequently listed on eBay and were priced at $200 before being delisted. A report by Heritage for Peace in August 2024 also documented damage to the Sudan Ethnographic Museum.

On 14 January 2024, the Sudanese Armed Forces launched airstrikes in the ancient Meroitic sites of Naqa and Musawwarat es-Sufra, which are both designated UNESCO World Heritage Sites, following incursions there by the RSF.

On 15 January 2025, the Sultan Ali Dinar Palace Museum in El Fasher was shelled by the RSF, causing a fire that heavily damaged the structure and destroyed its contents and furniture.

Following the expulsion of the RSF from Khartoum in March 2025, the director of Sudan's National Corporation for Antiquities and Museums (NCAM), Ghalia Garelnabi, accused the RSF of destroying 90% of the museum's holdings, looting its archaeological gold collection and deliberately smashing other artifacts. She also accused the RSF of vandalising the NCAM's offices.

In February 2026, officials of the Sudan University of Science and Technology accused the RSF of burning the library of the College of Forestry and musical instruments for fuel.

== Reactions ==
Efforts have been made to document Sudan's museum collections, led by the NCAM and involving international collaborations. At the Nile Valley Museum and the Shikan Museum some parts of the collection were prepared for removal to other locations. Shadia Abdrabo, a curator with NCAM, began creating a database of Sudan's archaeological sites and museums as part of a process of establishing the impact of the war. The Sudan Cultural Emergency Recovery Fund was established in 2025 to restore the country's museums and its cultural sector.

Members of the Sudanese Writers Union have suggested that the destruction of Sudan's cultural heritage has been carried out with the intention of erasing the country's history. The International Council of Museums condemned attacks on museums and cautioned about the likelihood of objects being trafficked as a result of the conflict. UNESCO used the Heritage Emergency Fund to support the protection of two World Heritage Sites and five museums in Sudan, and cautioned that trafficked looted artefacts could enter the art market. In November 2024, ten foreign nationals were arrested in River Nile State for trying to smuggle artefacts looted from the National Museum and the Nyala Museum that were stored in a factory in Atbara.

In the view of Amgad Farid of the think-tank Fikra for Studies and Development, "[The RSF's actions] constitute a deliberate and malicious assault on Sudan's historical identity ... it is a calculated endeavour to erase Sudan's legacy, to sever its people from their past, and to plunder millennia of human history for profit."

The French Archaeological Unit for Sudanese Antiquities (SFDAS), supported by the Louvre and Durham University, helped the National Museum of Sudan create a virtual site to display lost artefacts and recreate its exhibits.

== See also ==
- Hague Convention for the Protection of Cultural Property in the Event of Armed Conflict
- List of museums in Sudan
- List of World Heritage Sites in Sudan
