= List of museums in Sudan =

This is a list of museums in Sudan.

== Museums in Sudan ==
Name	Location	Type	Summary	Image
Khalifa House Museum	Omdurman	Ethnographical museum	Ethnographical collection covering the Mahdiyah rule	Cupula of the original Mahdi's Tomb
Sudan National Museum	El Neel Avenue, Khartoum	Archaeological museum	Contains the largest and most important archaeological collection in the country.	Statue of Pharaoh Taharqo
Kerma Museum	Kerma, Northern State	Archaeological site museum	Contains artefacts of the archeological site of Kerma.	Statues of the Nubian Black Pharaohs
Jebel Barkal Museum	Jebel Barkal, Northern State	Archaeological site museum	Contains artefacts of the area of Jebel Barkal.	Stela with meroitic inscriptions for Natakamani and Amanitore
Sudan Ethnographic Museum	Khartoum	Ethnographical collection	Ethnographic composition of Sudan	
Republican Palace Museum	Republican Palace complex, Khartoum	Ethnographical collection	Political history of Sudan	
Sheikan Museum	El Obeid	Archaeological and ethnographical museum	Established in the 1960s. Collections cover Kordofan history and archaeology	
South Darfur Museum	Nyala, South Darfur	Archaeological and ethnographical museum	Collections include artefacts from across Sudan. Closed in 2008 due to conflict, and reopened in 2018.	
Darfur Women's Museum	Nyala, South Darfur	Women's history museum	Founded in 1985 documenting the role of women in Sudan	
Ali Dinar Museum	El Fasher	Archaeological museum	Has a focus on Ali Dinar, Sultan of Darfur	

== See also ==
- Destruction of cultural heritage during the Sudanese civil war (2023–present)
- List of museums
