= Republican Palace Museum =

- متحف القصر الجمهوري
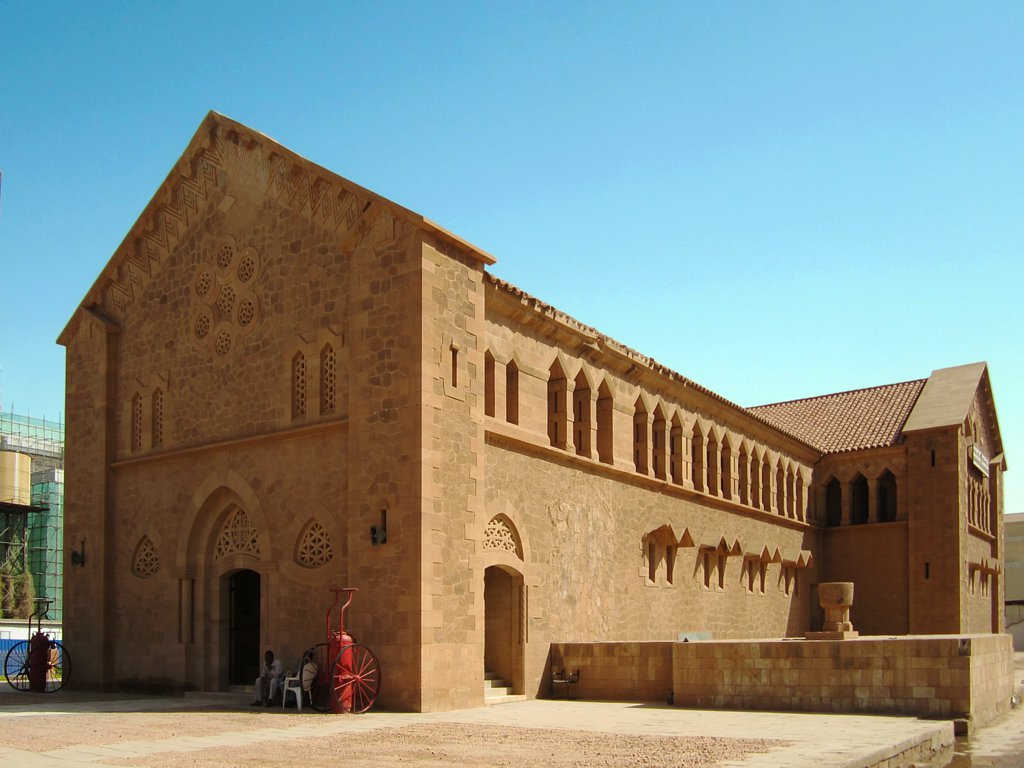
- The Republican Palace Museum in 2013
- Former names: All Saints' Cathedral (1912–1971)

General information
- Type: Museum
- Architectural style: Byzantine architecture
- Location: Nile Street, Khartoum, Sudan
- Coordinates: 15°36′29″N 32°31′44″E
- Opened: 31 December 1999; 26 years ago
- Owner: Anglo-Egyptian Sudan (1912–1955); Government of Sudan (1956–1971, 1997–present)

Technical details
- Grounds: 7,160 m^{2} (77,100 sq ft)

Website
- www.presidency.gov.sd/eng/museum

The Republican Palace Museum (Arabic: متحف القصر الجمهوري, romanized: mut'ḥaf al-qaṣr al-jumhūriyy) is a museum in Khartoum, Sudan. It forms part of the Republican Palace complex and contains objects associated with Sudan's political and administrative history.

The museum occupies the former All Saints' Cathedral, an Anglican cathedral completed in 1912. The cathedral closed in 1971, and the building was later converted into a museum. The Republican Palace Museum opened to the public on 31 December 1999.

== Location ==
The museum is located within the Republican Palace complex in Khartoum, southeast of the Old Republican Palace and the New Republican Palace. The building faces University Street, near the Ministry of Foreign Trade and the Martyrs' Gardens.

The museum grounds cover 7,160 square metres. The main hall has an area of 853 square metres and measures approximately 50.3 metres long and 13.8 metres wide. The building is 13 metres high externally and 10.3 metres high internally.

Most of the museum's collections originated from the Republican Palace. The museum is administered as part of the palace complex. It is one of several parts of the complex that have been accessible to the public, together with the palace library and mosque.

=== Opening hours ===
According to the Presidency of Sudan, the museum has been open on Sundays, Wednesdays and Fridays, from 9:00 a.m. to 1:00 p.m. and from 4:00 p.m. to 8:00 p.m.

== History ==
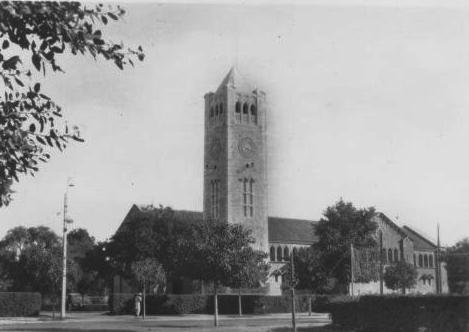
All Saints' Cathedral in 1941

The museum occupies a former Anglican cathedral. All Saints' Cathedral was commissioned by Governor-General Reginald Wingate and completed in 1912. The building was designed in the Byzantine architectural style.

Mabel Esplin designed several stained-glass windows for the cathedral. In 1911, she was commissioned to produce seven lancet windows. Further windows completed in 1912 depicted St Alban, St Edmund, St Theodore and St Sebastian. She also designed a three-light window for the Gordon Memorial Chapel based on the theme "Hope, Faith and Charity".

Other work included a circular west window for the south transept, an east window depicting "Death and Resurrection", and another three-light window for the Gordon Memorial Chapel with the theme "Fortitude, Justice and Wisdom". In one window, Balthazar was portrayed wearing the clothing of a Sudanese sheikh.

Ill health prevented Esplin from completing the entire commission. Some of the remaining designs were produced by Joan Fulleylove, who had worked as Esplin's assistant. (Note: One such window was made in 1919/20 and entitled Patience, Temperance and Chastity.)

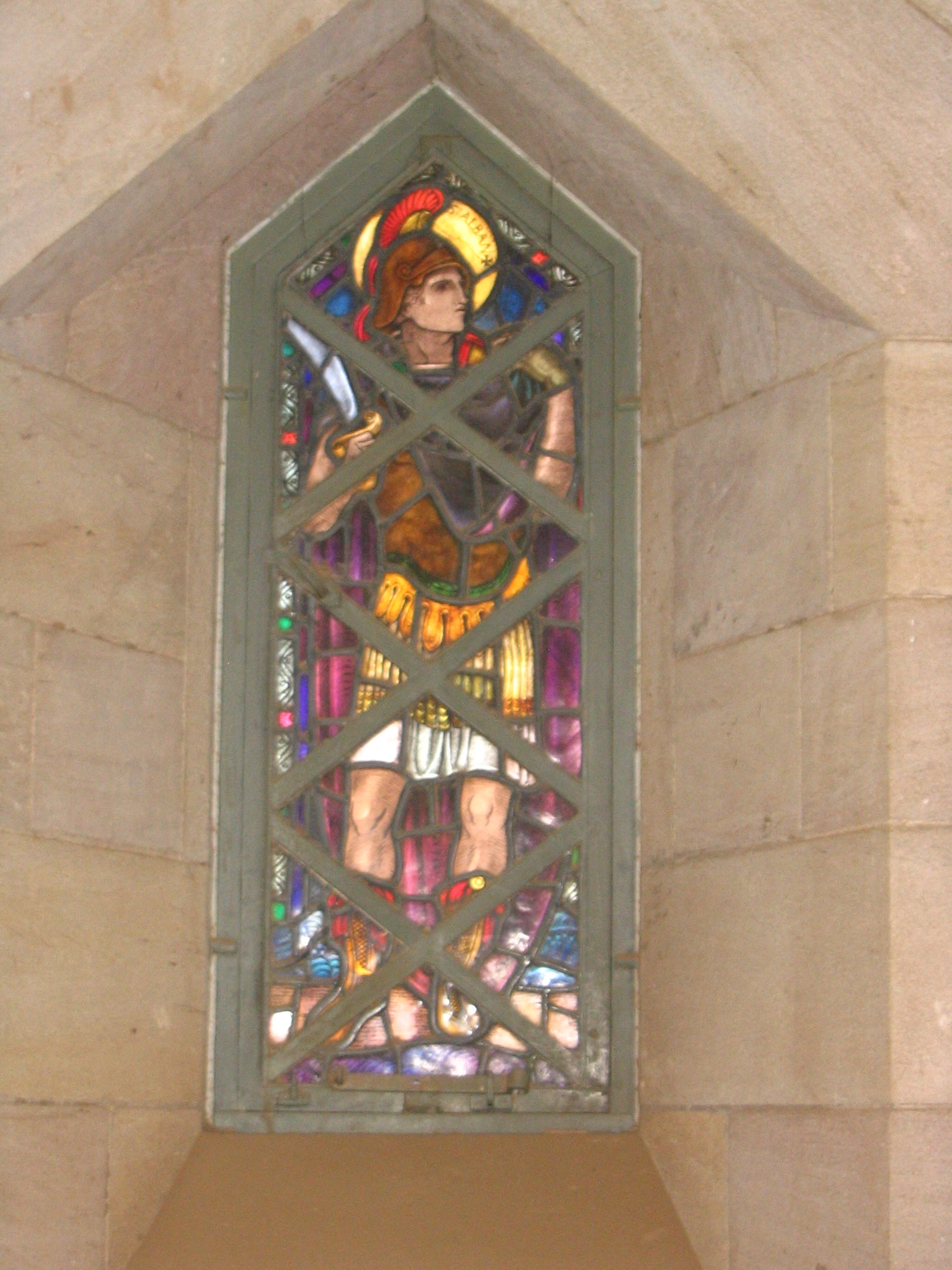
St Alban stained glass

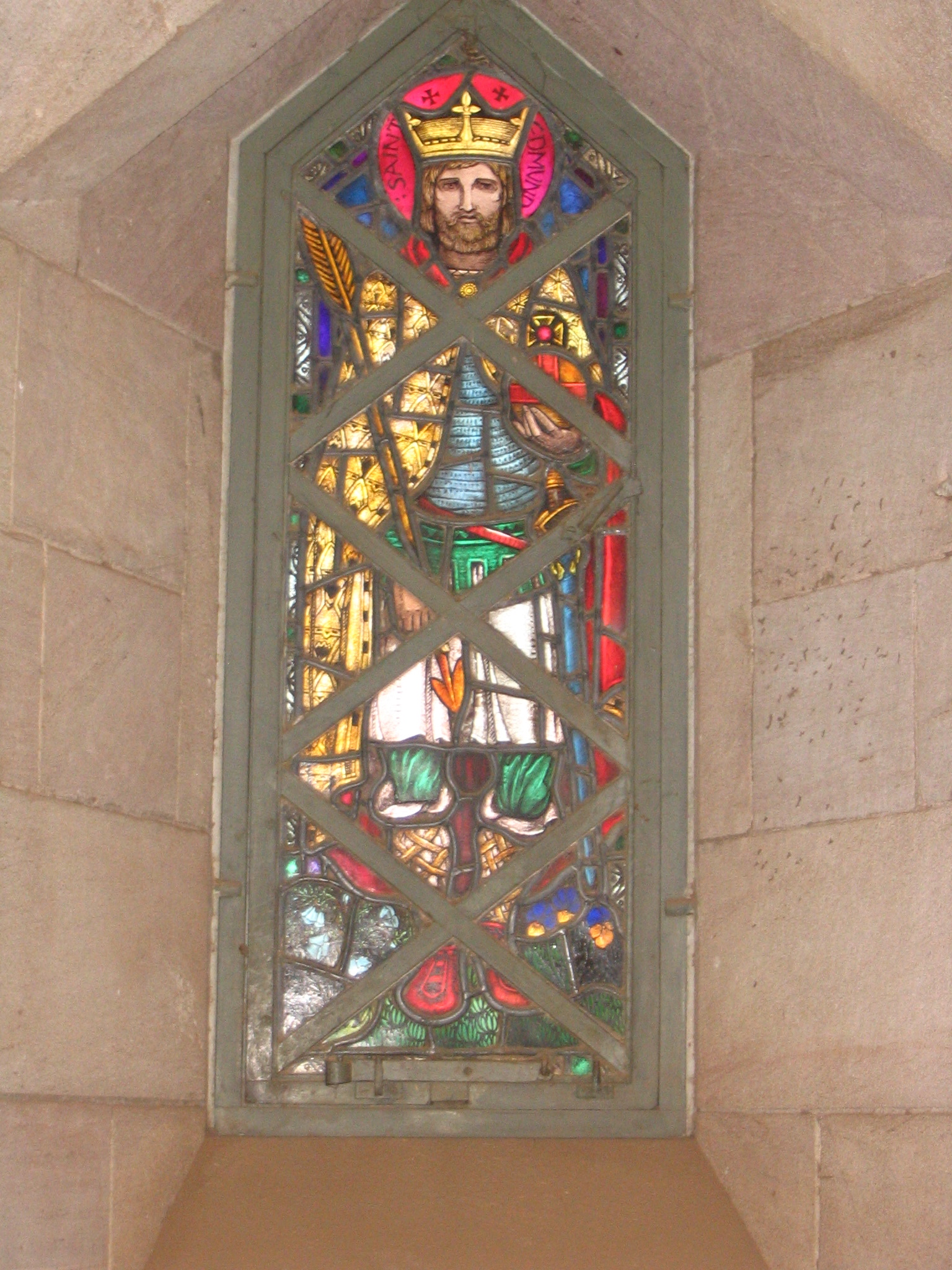
St Edmund stained glass

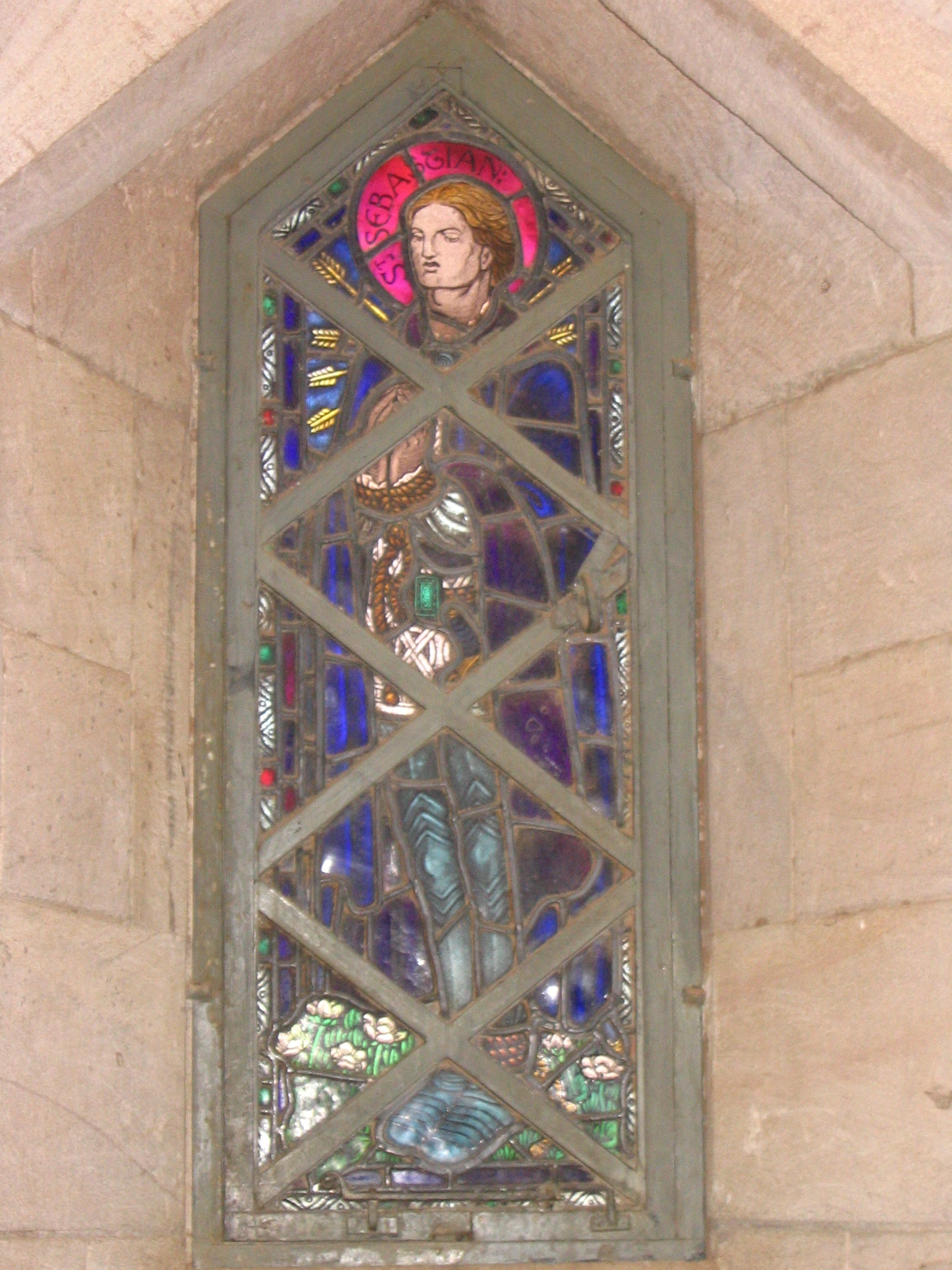
St Sebastian stained glass

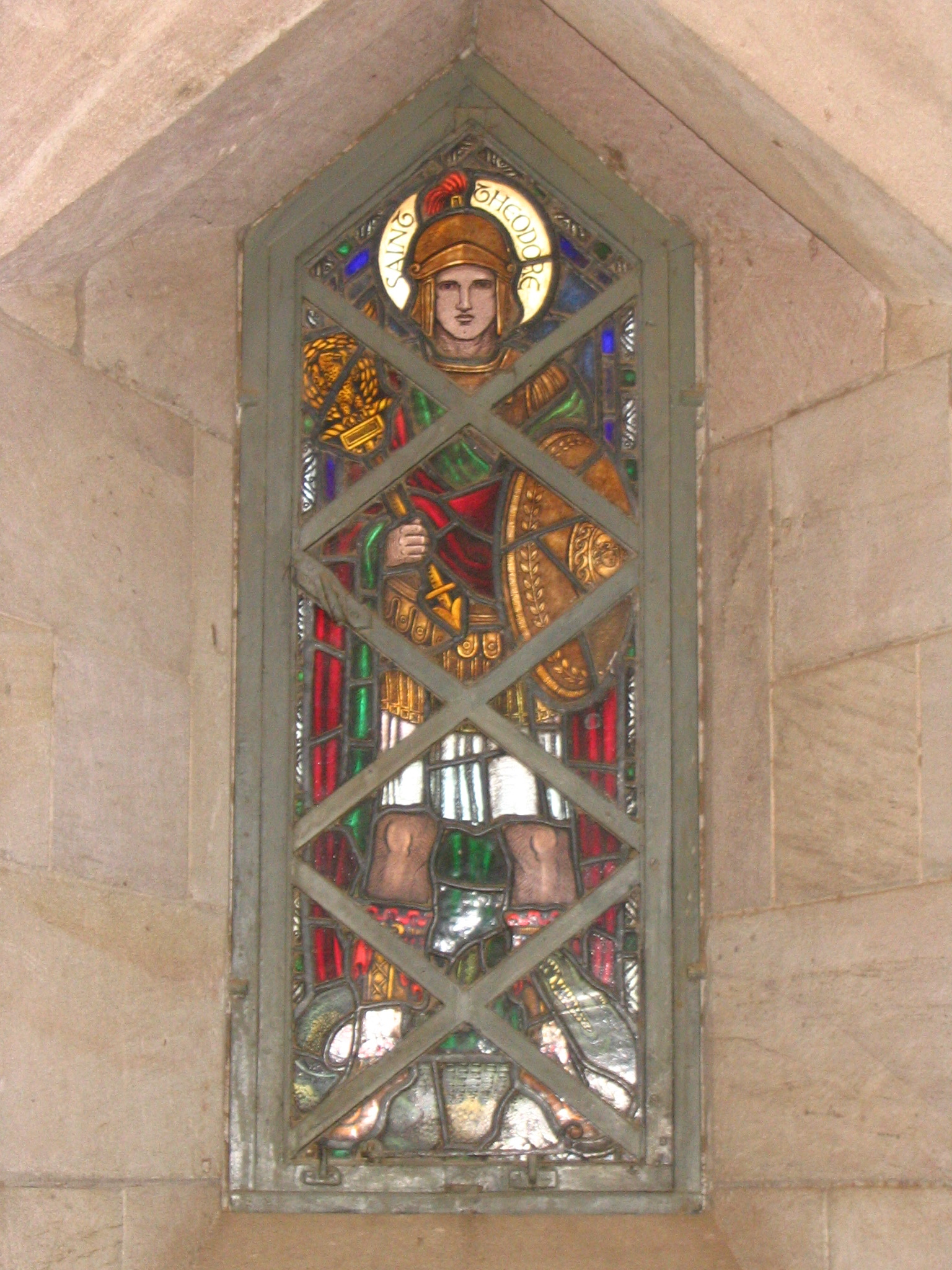
St Theodore stained glass

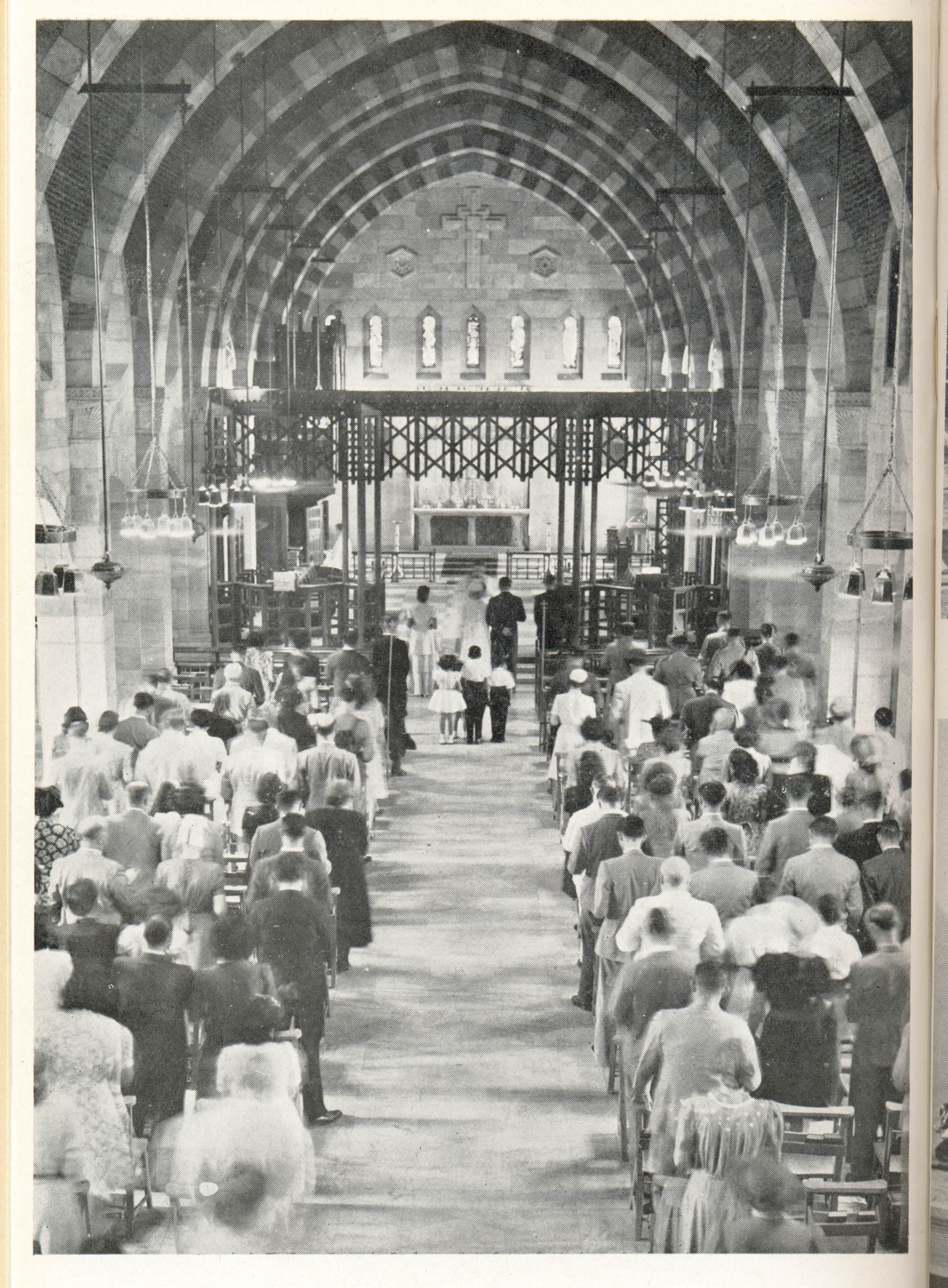
Wedding at the cathedral

The cathedral remained in use until 1971, when it closed for security reasons. A replacement church was built in Al-Amarat. The former cathedral remained unused for several years. Its bell tower was removed in October 1996, and conversion of the building into a museum began in 1997.

The museum was inaugurated on 31 December 1999 by President Omar al-Bashir.

== Role and activities ==
The museum preserves and displays objects associated with Sudan's heads of state, the Republican Palace and the country's modern political history. Its collections include official documents, photographs, furniture, vehicles, decorations, gifts and other objects formerly kept in the palace.

The museum has also organised lectures, seminars, temporary exhibitions and activities for schools and other educational institutions. It has participated in exhibitions in Sudan and abroad.

Educational activities have included programmes on Sudanese government institutions, state ceremonies, museums and cultural heritage. The museum has also operated art activities for children and students.

== Collections ==
The museum's permanent collections cover several periods of Sudanese political history, including the Anglo-Egyptian period and the post-independence period. Temporary exhibitions have also been organised for national commemorations and other events.

=== Automobiles ===
A pavilion outside the main museum building contains vehicles used by colonial governors and Sudanese heads of state. The collection includes Rolls-Royce and Humber cars.

One Rolls-Royce is described as having been presented by Fuad I of Egypt in 1924 to Governor-General Robert Howe. Another Rolls-Royce was presented to President Jaafar Nimeiry in 1984 and had a bullet-resistant body.

The collection also includes Humber cars used by governors-general between 1940 and 1956 and a 1954 Rolls-Royce used by the last British Governor-General, Alexander Knox Helm. Following Sudanese independence, the car was used by members of the First Sudanese Sovereignty Council. It was also used during visits by foreign heads of state, including Egyptian President Gamal Abdel Nasser in November 1959.

=== Photographs and paintings ===
The museum contains portraits and photographs of Sudanese rulers, presidents and government officials, as well as foreign figures associated with Sudan's political history. These include portraits of Fuad I of Egypt, King Farouk and Lord Allenby.

The collection also includes photographs and paintings of Sudanese political figures such as Ismail al-Azhari, Ibrahim Abboud, Jaafar Nimeiri, Abdel Rahman Swar al-Dahab, Muhammad Ahmed Al-Mahjoub, Al-Khatim Al-Khalifa and Al-Jazuli Daf'allah.

=== Honours ===
The museum displays Sudanese orders, medals and other decorations, including the Order of the Two Niles.

=== Presidential gifts ===
Objects presented to Sudanese presidents by foreign governments and officials are displayed in the museum. One example is a large vessel presented by Pakistani Prime Minister Zulfikar Ali Bhutto to President Nimeiri during a visit to Sudan.

=== Musical instruments, utensils and furniture ===
The museum contains furniture, tableware and musical instruments formerly used in the Republican Palace. Exhibits include wooden presidential tables decorated with copper, a chair used by President Ismail al-Azhari, and a rectangular table associated with the inauguration of Sudan's first Consultative Council in 1946.

The collection also includes a piano associated with General Charles George Gordon and a large electric piano brought to the palace in 1916.

=== Documentation ===
The documentation section contains material relating to Sudan's nationalist movement and the country's path to independence.

=== Decorations ===
A separate section contains decorations and commemorative objects associated with the Republican Palace.

=== Weapons ===
The weapons collection includes firearms and swords associated with Turkish Sudan, the Mahdist uprising and the Anglo-Egyptian conquest of Sudan.

=== Library ===
A public library is attached to the museum. Books acquired by the Republican Palace during the Anglo-Egyptian period were initially stored by the palace's ceremonial department. In 1976, a room in the main palace building was allocated for a library.

The collection was expanded in subsequent years. The library was later moved to the southeastern part of the palace to make space for the vice-president's office. A reading room and two archive rooms were added, with one archive room used for document storage and the other for exhibitions.

== See also ==
- List of museums in Sudan
