= Sudan Ethnographic Museum =

Museum in Khartoum, Sudan

The Sudan Ethnographic Museum is a public museum in Khartoum, the capital of Sudan. Established in 1956 as a branch of the National Museum of Sudan, it is located at the corner of El Mek Nimr and al-Gamaa Avenue in downtown Khartoum. Until its closure in the early 2020s, the museum presented cultural objects representing the lifestyles and traditions of different regions and some of the many ethnic groups of Sudan.

Along with other museums in Khartoum, the Ethnographic Museum was subjected to looting and vandalism due to the war in Sudan since 15 April 2023. A project for complete renovation and digital inventories of the collection was started in 2022 by the Cultural Protection Fund (CPF) of the British Council and other international, as well as Sudanese organizations. It is accessible online through the platform "Safeguarding Sudan's Living Heritage."

== Collection ==
=== History ===
The Ethnographic Museum was established in 1956 as a branch of the older and larger National Museum of Sudan during the last period of the Anglo-Egyptian colonial administration. Some of these objects had already been collected and given to Gordon Memorial College at the beginning of the twentieth century.

Following their field studies in southern Sudan during the late 1950s and early 1960s, the Austrian social anthropologists Andreas and Waltraut Kronenberg donated grave sculptures of the Bongo people and other cultural objects from southern Sudan to the museum. In 1972, the museum was relocated and opened under the scientific direction of the German ethnologist Lothar Stein in a former officers club in al-Gamaa Avenue in downtown Khartoum. Stein, a scholar from Leipzig in former East Germany, had also collected artefacts for the museum in Kordofan and Darfur. In 2002, the Ethnographic Museum was administratively separated from the Sudan National Museum and renamed Sudan Civilization Institute.

During this period, the museum contained a modest collection of tribal artefacts representing different regions and ethnic groups of Sudan. Its sections were ordered by geographic region, showing how people lived in each climatic area. The first rooms presented life and artefacts from southern Sudan, then objects from the savannah regions south of Khartoum, followed by objects from the northern deserts. Exhibits in the form of dioramas presented scenes from diverse ethnic groups, including the Baggara and Rashaida nomads, the Nuba peoples, as well as other Sudanese ethnic groups.

After the Sudanese revolution of December 2019, the collection was rearranged in six sections: traditional musical instruments, including the Sultan of Yambio's big wooden war drum, Sudanese traditions of preparing food, handicrafts, of providing traditional Islamic education (Khalwa primary schools, studies of the Quran and Arabic language), the use of sailing boats on the Nile, as well as other Sudanese customs, such as wedding ceremonies and women's clothes and accessories.

=== Renovation, digital access and protection against climate change ===
In November 2022, the British Council announced funding for a complete renovation of the inaccessible ethnographic museum through its Cultural Protection Fund (CPF). Apart from modernizing the former exhibition and including further cultural objects from pastoralists in Darfur and Kordofan, this project aims to prevent the impacts of flooding caused by climate change and to build a new domed roof for the museum. For the British-Sudanese project "Safeguarding Sudan's Living Heritage from Conflict and Climate Change" (SSLH), the CPF also funded the creation of an online platform. As an overarching aim, the SSLH strives to support "vulnerable communities to document their culture and help build resilience [...] in a healthy environment." In more specific terms, the project stated:

Our mission is to rally support for Sudan's living heritage and its multifaceted cultural panorama. It encompasses how people dance, create music, cultivate their food, care for their livestock, craft artifacts, celebrate traditions, and practice their beliefs. This cultural legacy is deeply interwoven into Sudan's history, landscape and identity, both rural and urban. It serves as a wellspring of local wisdom and vibrancy that can help shape Sudan's future.

— Safeguarding Sudan's Living Heritage

Partners in this project are several British, international and Sudanese cultural institutions, including the Sudan National Corporation for Antiquities and Museums, the British Institute of Eastern Africa, the Regional Conservation Office of the International Centre for the Study of the Preservation and Restoration of Cultural Property (ICCROM)-ATHAR, the Cambridge Heritage Research Centre (CHRC), as well as the Mapping Africa’s Endangered Archaeological Sites and Monuments Project. The project received £ 1,893,340 from the CPF in partnership with the British government Department for Digital, Culture, Media and Sport (DCMS) and was started in December 2022. Further, the SSLH is managed under the umbrella of the UNESCO Cultural Heritage conventions and in coordination with the National Council for Cultural Heritage and Promotional of National Languages.

Another project for collecting and making Sudan's cultural heritage accessible online is Sudan Memory, funded also by the British Council's Cultural Protection Fund and started in 2018. Similar to other museums in Khartoum, the Ethnographic Museum has been subject to looting and vandalism in the wake of the ongoing war in Sudan since 15 April 2023.

=== Objects in the collection ===
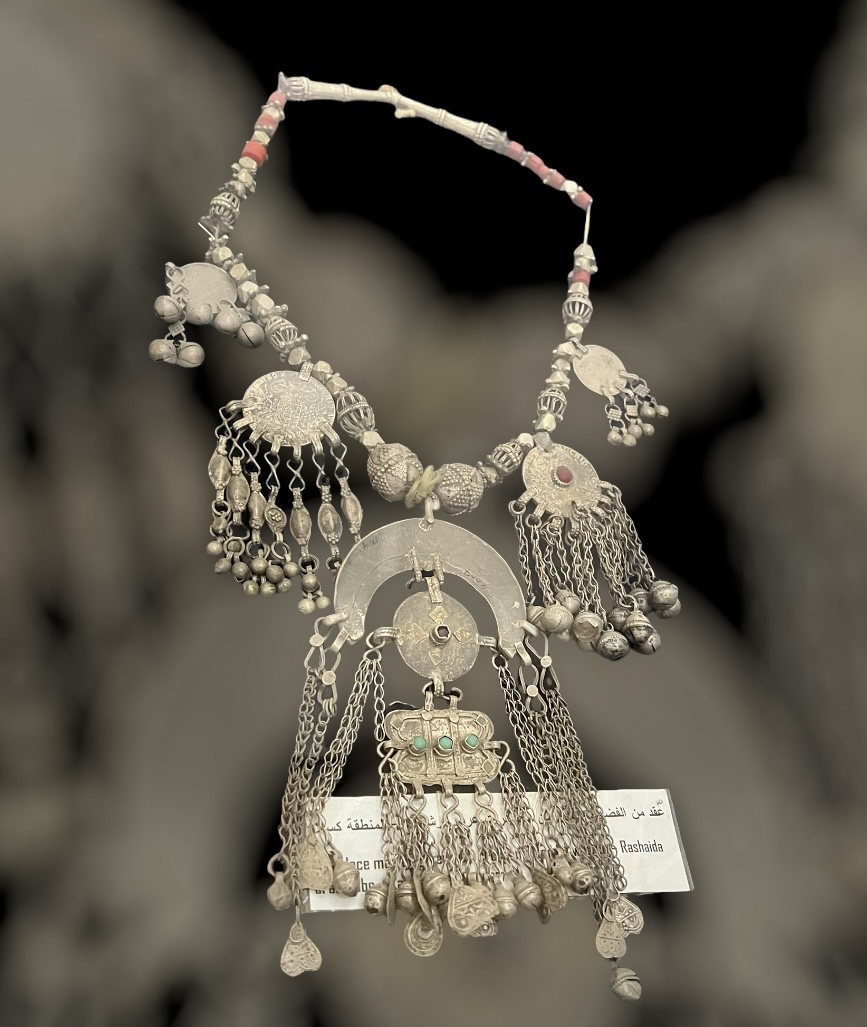
Rashaida silver jewelry

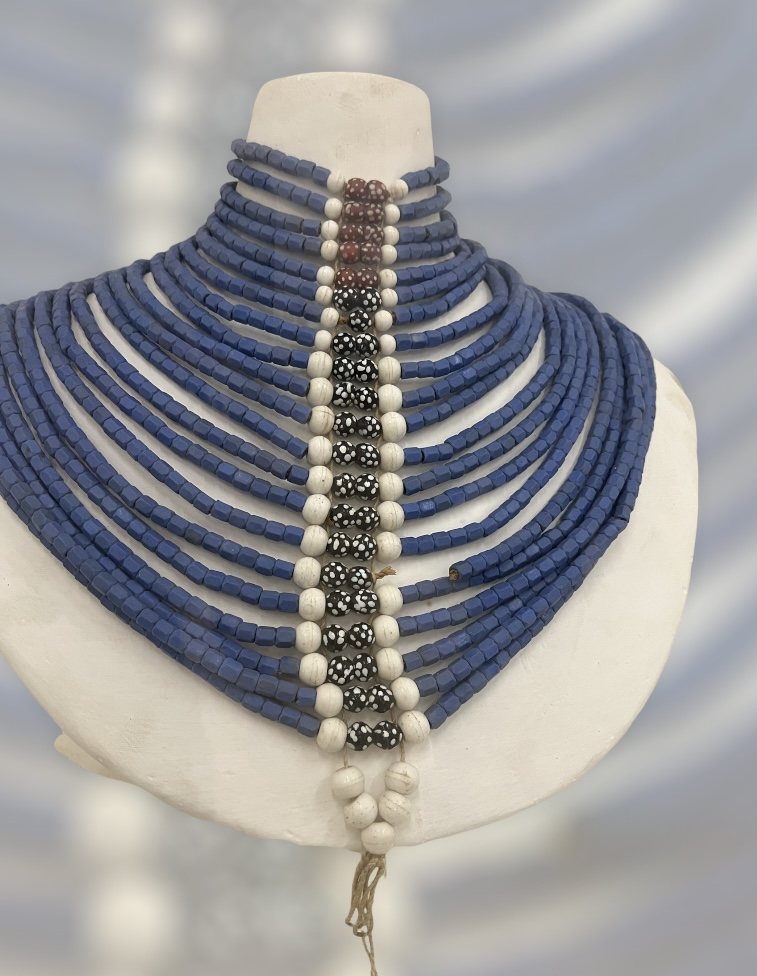
Dinka beaded collar

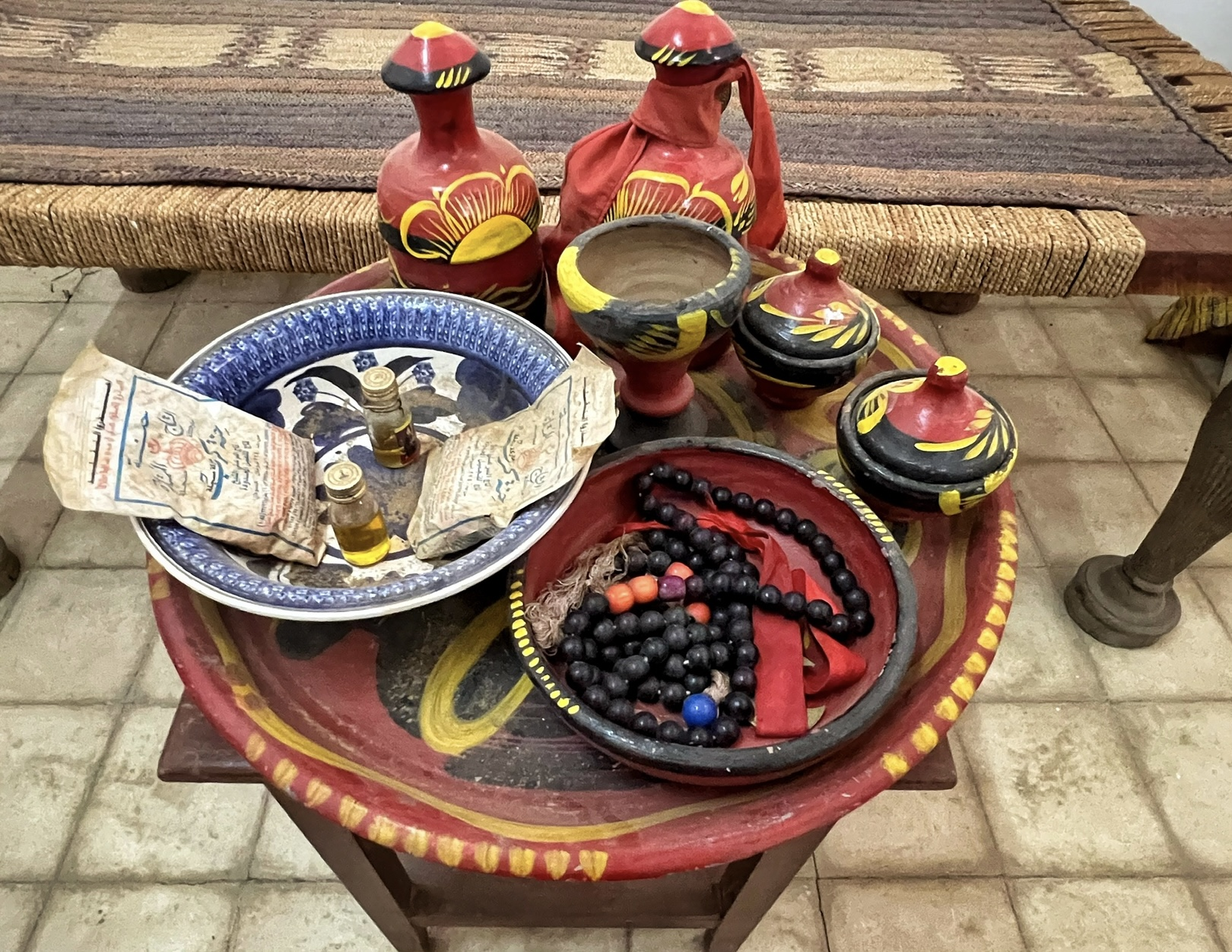
Sudanese wedding Jertig paraphernalia

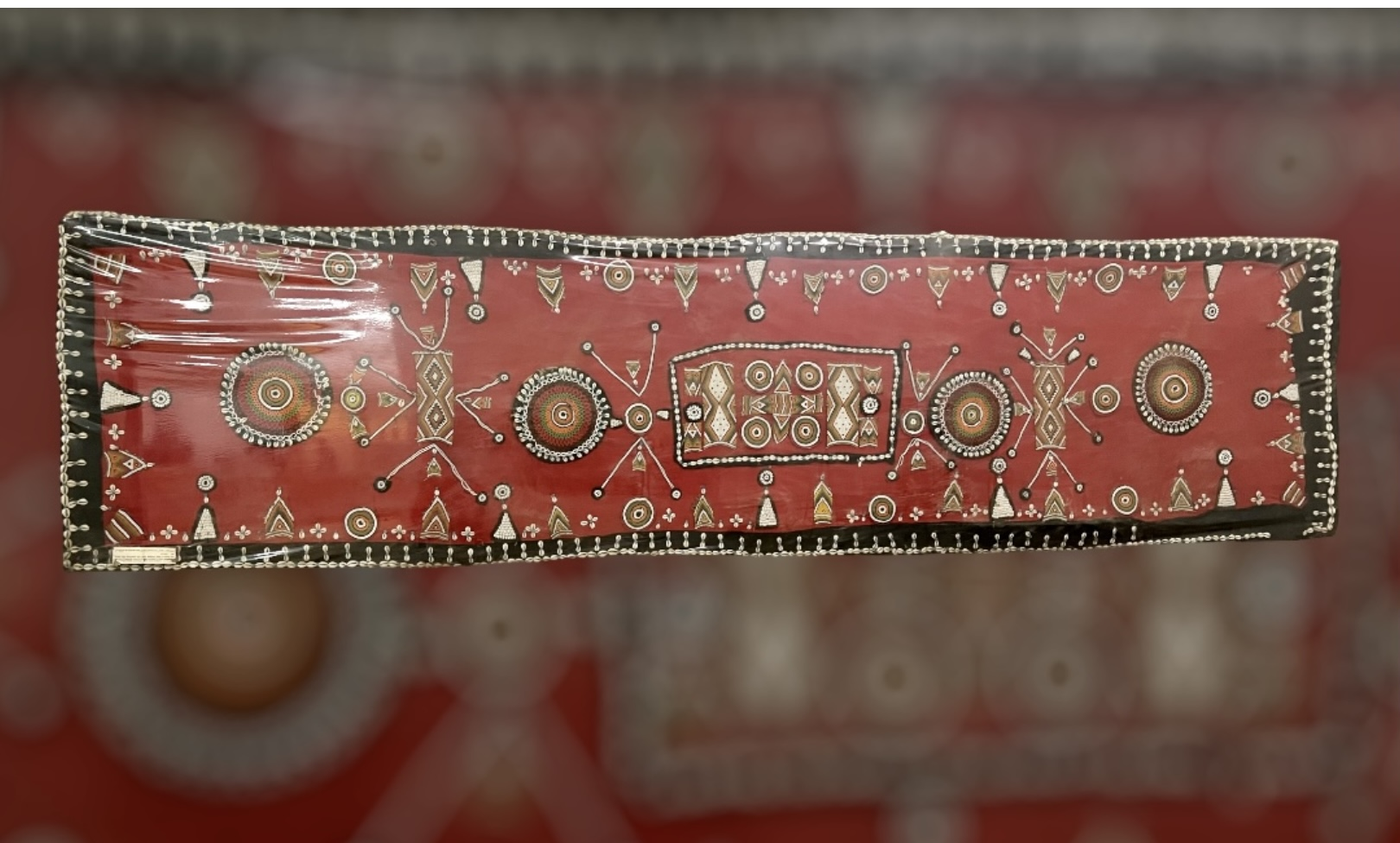
Beaded, embroidered bridal mat, Beni-Amer tribe

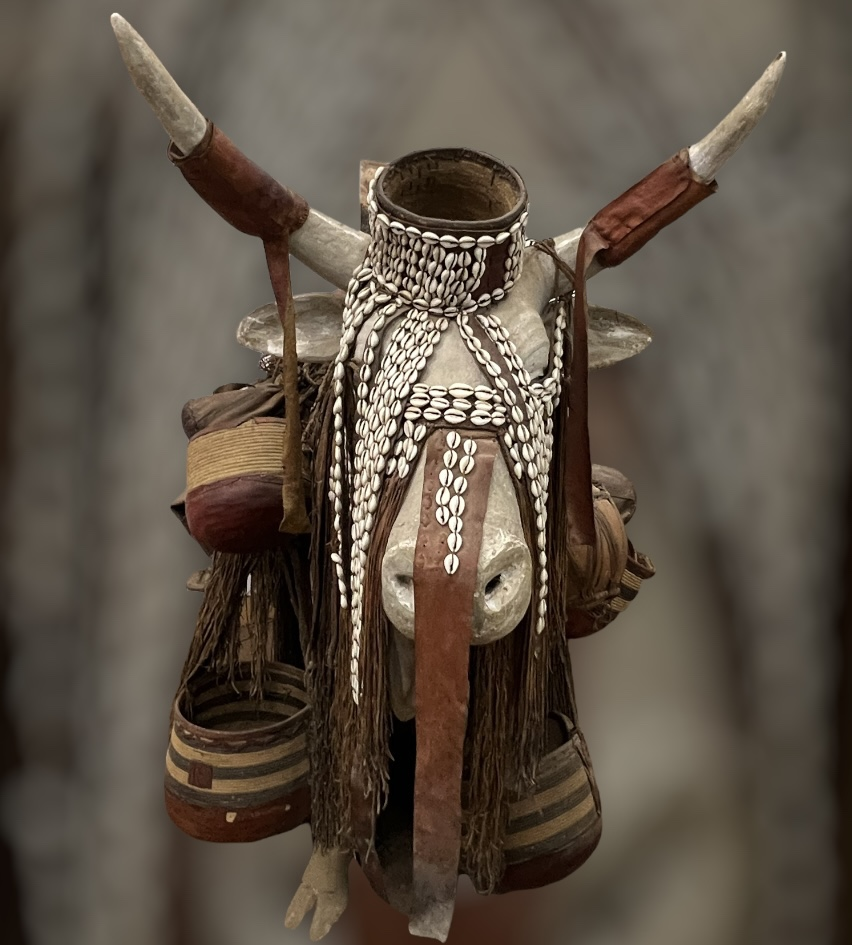
Baggara bull trappings

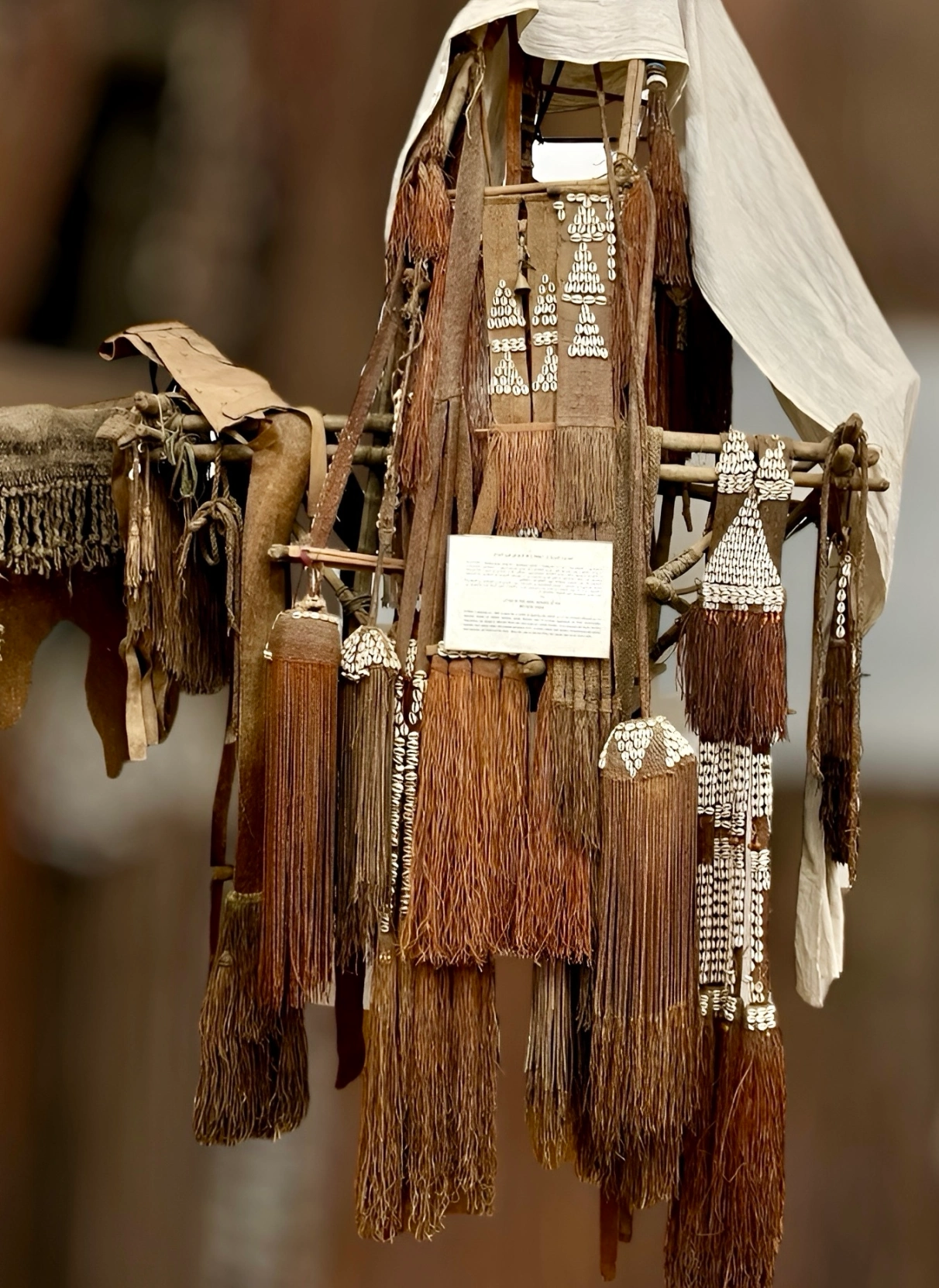
Ornamental camel trappings

== See also ==
- Culture of Sudan
- List of museums in Sudan
- Sudan Memory
