= Republican Palace, Khartoum =

Building in Khartoum, Sudan

Republican Palace
- القصر الجمهوري
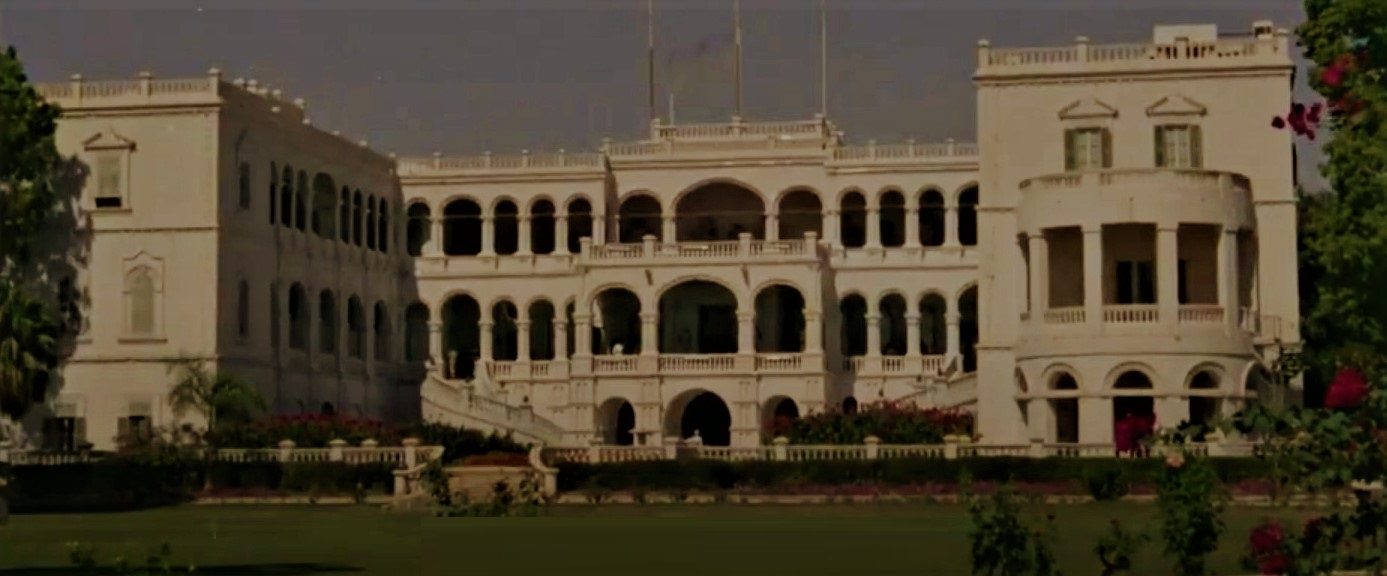
- The Old Republican Palace in 1940
- Former names: Hakimadaria Palace (1828–1885); Governor-General's Palace (1900–1956); Republican Palace (1956–1971); People's Palace (1971–1985); Republican Palace (1985–2015); New Republican Palace (since 2015)

General information
- Type: Presidential Palace
- Architectural style: English Palladian architecture (Old Republican Palace); Islamic architecture (New Republican Palace)
- Location: Nile street, Khartoum, Sudan
- Coordinates: 15°36′33″N 32°31′40″E
- Completed: Hakimadaria Palace (1825 – 1828; 3 years); Governor-General's Palace (1899 – 1900; 1 year); New Republican Palace (2010 – 2015; 4 years)
- Opened: Hakimadaria Palace (1828 – 1885; 56–57 years) (Old) Republican Palace (1900; 126 years ago); New Republican Palace (26 January 2015; 11 years ago)
- Owner: Turkish Sudan (1828 – 1885); Anglo-Egyptian Sudan (1900 – 1955); Government of Sudan (since 1956)

Technical details
- Grounds: 150,000 m^{2} (1,600,000 sq ft)

Other information
- Facilities: Republican Palace Museum; Republican Guard HQ; General Gordon's Last Stand's staircase

Website
- www.presidency.gov.sd

The Republican Palace in Khartoum (Arabic: القصر الجمهوري, al-Qaṣr al-Jumhūriy) is the official residence and work place of the President of Sudan. It is a complex which consists of the Old Republican Palace, which was built in 1830, and the New Republican Palace, which was built in 2015. The Republican Palace has historical and cultural significance in Sudan. The palace is not open to the public. A museum is located behind the complex.

The Republican Palace is a political symbol in Sudan. It is featured in Sudanese postage stamps and banknotes. The palace overlooks the southern Bank of the Blue Nile River, near the confluence of the Blue Nile and White Nile.

The Old Republican Palace was the location of the killing of Charles Gordon, the ruler of British Sudan, during the Turco-Egyptian colonisation of Sudan at the hands of the supporters of the Mahdist revolution. The palace was also the location of the first celebration of Sudan's independence from the Anglo-Egyptian colonisation and the lowering of the flags of the colonial administration and the raising of the flag of the Sudanese Republic in January 1956.

== Location ==
The Republican Palace complex can be found on the south side of the Blue Nile river. It is bordered to the north by Nile Street, to the south by University Avenue, to the east by Abusin Street, and to the west by the Street of Mihera Bint Abboud. The city planners of Khartoum intended for the Republican Palace to serve as a way to divide the city into two parts, with government buildings and offices, commercial institutions, and other important institutions built around it.

== History ==
Sudan fell under the rule of Turkish-Egyptian colonisation in 1821 after Muhammad Ali Pasha seized control. Egypt governed Sudan during this period, with a governor known as the Hakimadar ruling the region. The capital of Sudan was moved from Funj Sennar (1504–1821) to Wad Medani during the reign of Hakimadar Osman Bey Jarkas (September 1824 to May 1825). He made Khartoum his seat of power and gradually shifted the state's offices from Wad Madani to Khartoum. Khartoum eventually became the capital of Sudan in 1830, marking the final transition of power.

=== Hakimadaria Palace (Saraya al-Hikmadar) ===
During the reign of Hakimadar Mahu Bey Urfali (May 1825 to March 1826), the first mud-built Palace was constructed in a rectangular as the main office for the administration of Sudan. The palace was situated on the southern bank of the Blue Nile, at a distance of under one kilometer from the intersection of the White and Blue Niles. It was named Saray al-Hakimadaria or Hakimadaria Palace, and the Hakimadar's residence was located there. Al-Saraya is a word of Persian origin, meaning castle or palace. It was used extensively during the Ottoman Empire (in Turkish, Seray), with the same meaning.

In 1834, during the rule of Hakimadar Ali Khurshid Pasha (March 1826 to June 1838), some improvements and additions were made to the Hakimadaria palace, and the province's building was established. The offices and interests of the State Administration were transferred to it, and Hakimadaria Palace remained the Hakimadar's residence.

In 1851, during the reign of Hakimadar Abd al-Latif Pasha (1849 to January 1851), the mud Hakimadaria Palace was destroyed and rebuilt using bricks. The bricks were carried from two different sources: the remnants of the ancient city of Soba, which was the capital of the ancient Kingdom of Alodia, and certain structures in Abu Haraz located on the eastern bank of the Blue Nile. The new palace consisted of two flats, made of stones from the outside, and had a separate pavilion for male and female visitors. It was surrounded by gardens with various types of trees such as palm trees and grapes. The Hakimadaria Palace remained the Hakimadar's seat until the Mahdist revolution.

The palace consists of three parts: a ground part topped by two floors: the first floor and the second floor. Later, the offices of Al-Hakamdar (governor-general) were moved to the second floor inside the palace, while the ground floor was allocated to the offices of Al-Hakamdar's assistants and his secretaries, while the first floor remained his residence, and other annex buildings were built to house his entourage outside the palace building. But this division was later changed when Charles Gordon Pasha (18 February 1884 to 26 January 1885), Governor-General of Sudan, decided in 1884 that his residence be on the second floor and that he move his office to the first floor.

After the siege of Khartoum and killing of Hakimadar Charles Gordon in Hakimadaria Palace on 26 January 1885, and during the early days of the Mahdi's state (1885 to 1898), a national governance was established. The Hakimadaria palace building was demolished, and the capital was relocated to Omdurman, the Nile's west bank. The capital and headquarters of the Mahdist state (Caliph House) remained in Omdurman until the Anglo-Egyptian colonisation.

=== Governor-General's Palace ===
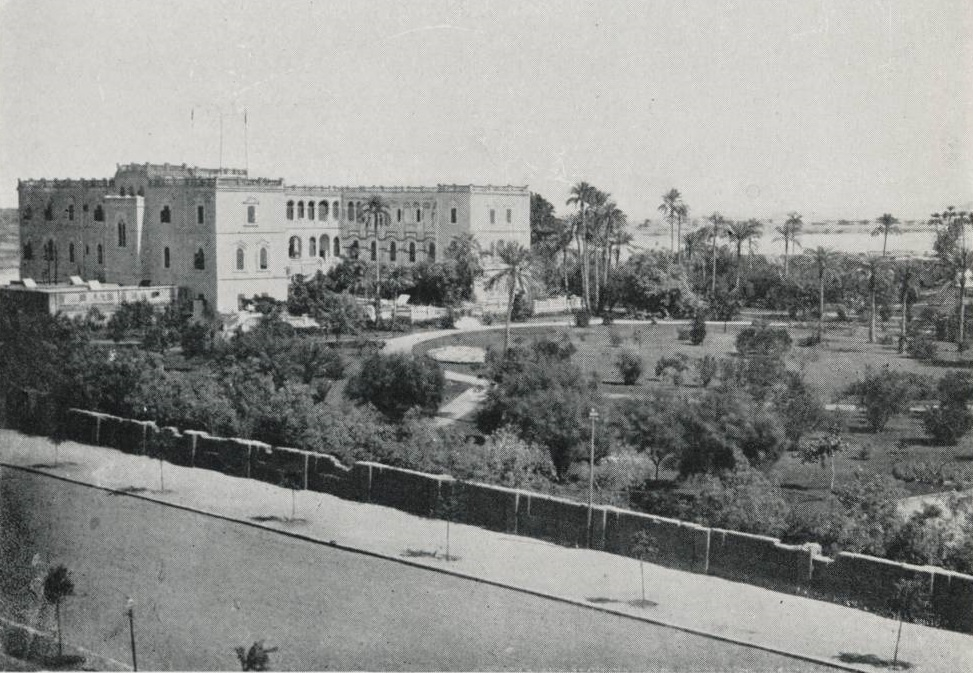
Governor-General's Palace in 1906

During the period of Anglo-Egyptian colonisation of Sudan from 1898 to 31 December 1955, Khartoum become the capital of Sudan. The first governor general of Sudan, Herbert Kitchener (19 January 1898 to 22 December 1899), rebuilt the palace in 1899 on the stones of the demolished Hakimadaria Palace. By 1900, a large part of the palace building was completed for the second governor, Reginald Wingate (22 December 1899 to 31 December 1916) to settle in the Palace. The remainder of the palace including the annexes was completed by 1906.

The Palace was built with red bricks and the corners were built with sandstone. The palace buildings were modelled after Victorian architecture, with a clear Middle Eastern touch of arched doors and windows along with Roman and Greek windows, balconies and Mediterranean balconies. The Palace had a three floors including a ground floor with three pavilions: a main pavilion facing the Blue Nile, east and west wings stretching from the main pavilion to the south ones, and the entire construction represented half of a square. The ground floor was allocated to the administration offices, the first floor to the Church of England and the third to the governor-general's office.

After the Directorate building was constructed to the west of the governor's, which is now the Ministry of Finance, the administrative and financial secretary office was repurposed to the General Governor's Palace, which remained the general headquarters and residence of the governor general of Sudan during all periods of the Anglo-Egyptian colonisation. The total area of the palace reached 74,000 m^{2} (800,000 sq ft) during this period.

=== (Old) Republican Palace ===
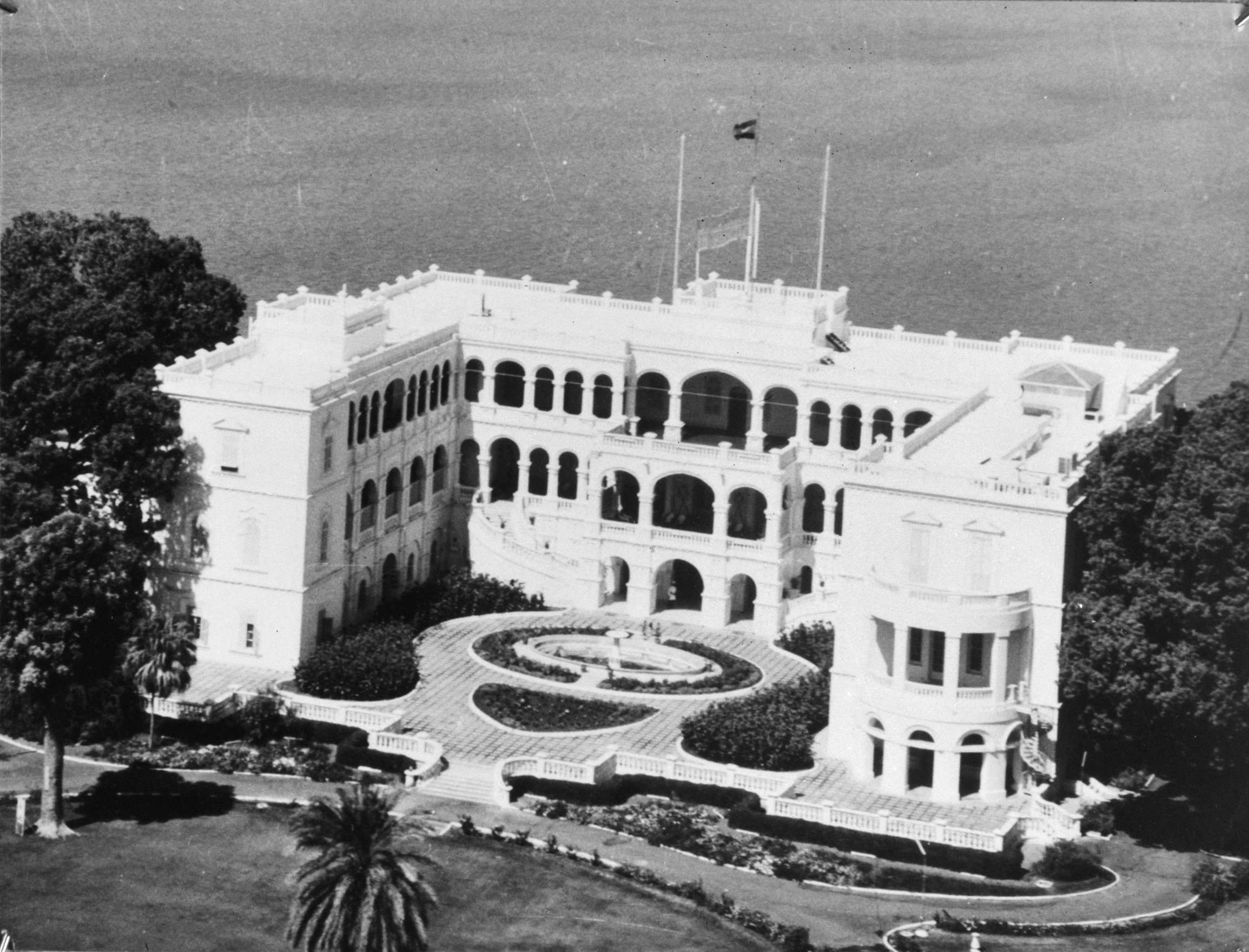
Old Republican Palace in 1965

On 1 January 1956, Sudan gained independence, and the British and Egyptian flags were lowered while the Sudanese flag was raised in the palace staff. The Palace became known as the Republican Palace and served as the official residence for the president of the Republic of Sudan. It also housed the offices of the Sovereignty Council members and the presidency departments. The prime minister had a separate residence and offices in a different location. The palace's second floor was used as a guesthouse for visiting heads of state until 1974. Other sites outside the palace were also used for hospitality. In 1960, a residence was built in the south-western part of the Republican Palace for former president Ibrahim Abboud, who was the only Sudanese head of state to have lived inside the Palace. In 1971, additional buildings were constructed on the south side of the Palace for the Palace's departments, the Republican Guard, and car parking. Other areas of the Palace on the eastern side were added to create the College of the Republican Palace, expanding the Palace's total space to 150,000 m^{2} (1,600,000 sq ft).

==== People's Palace ====
President Jaafar al-Numeiri, who came to power after the 1969 Sudanese coup d'état, decided to change the name of the Palace to the People's Palace in a speech he delivered to the nation after the failure of the coup that was led against him by Major Hashem al-Atta, given that “the people were the ones who supported Nimeiri”. During the failed coup, Numeiri was detained, later smuggled, and was able to jump the palace's southern wall. However, after the overthrow of Nimeiri's rule by military personnel led by Field Marshal Abdel Rahman Swar al-Dahab, the palace was renamed the Republican Palace.

==== Archaeological landmark ====
According to the Sudanese Antiquities Law, the old Republican Palace building is considered an archaeological landmark, regardless of the period it was built in, if it is more than 100 years old or has special historical significance. The List of National Antiquities gives it legal protection, preventing its disposal and any modifications or restoration without the authority's supervision. The building is made from archaeological materials from the remnants of the Christian kingdom of Alwa, making it an archaeological building with archaeological materials.

=== New Republican Palace ===
During the Chinese president Hu Jintao visit to Sudan in 2007, an agreement was reached to build a new presidential palace. After completing technical studies, a contract was signed in 2009 to design the new building, and an execution contract was signed on 25 November 2010. The project commenced in March 2011, and on the night of 26 January 2015, the same day Charles Gordon was killed on the steps of the Old Palace, the new presidential palace was officially inaugurated by President Omar al-Bashir. The flag was raised over the new presidential palace to mark the transfer to the new location.

The director of museums criticized the decision to build a new palace without consulting the Antiquities Authority, which affected the panorama of the historical building and its architectural consistency. The new Arabic style building is completely different from the old palace's English Palladian architecture, and the palace garden, an integral part of the design, was clearly affected.

=== Sudanese civil war ===
During the Sudanese civil war (2023–present) on 15 April 2023, the Rapid Support Forces (RSF) took control of the Republican Palace.

On 9 May, the RSF accused the Sudanese Armed Forces (SAF) of carrying out an air strike that destroyed the old palace, which the latter denied. Pictures sent to the BBC by a Khartoum resident appeared to contradict the RSF's claims of the destruction but showed the new palace had been severely damaged by a fire. On 6 August 2023, the SAF launched airstrikes and artillery on the palace. On 12 May 2024, the SAF shelled the old palace, setting fire to parts of the building.

The Sudanese Armed Forces retook control of the palace on 21 March 2025.

== Facilities ==
The Republican Palace has historical and cultural significance in Sudan. The palace is not open to the public, but there is a museum located behind it that visitors can explore. The Palace name is given to the main street leading to it from the south, which was formerly known as Victoria Street. The Republican Palace is considered one of the main architectural landmarks in Khartoum, and it overlooks the southern bank of the Blue Nile River, near the confluence of the Blue and White Niles, and in one of the most beautiful triangular streets of the capital. From the southern side, the palace overlooks a small square that bore its name "Palace Square" before it was renamed Martyrs Square.

The Republican Palace complex consists of the New Presidential Palace building, located in an area of 5,300 m^{2} (57,000 sq ft), and the Old Presidential Palace building, located in an area of 1,926 m^{2} (20,730 sq ft). The complex also includes:

=== Office of the Head of State ===
Sir Lee Stack, Governor-General of Sudan (1916–1924) had moved his office from the place that has now become a meeting hall to the official residence of the office of the president of the Republic of Sudan. Subsequent rulers of Sudan followed suit, and after independence in 1956, the office of the governor-general became the office of the head of state, and successive presidents Ismail Al-Azhari, Ibrahim Abboud, Jaafar Al-Numeiri, Abd Al-Rahman Suwar Al-Dahab, Ahmed Al-Mirghani, and Omar Al-Bashir.

=== Office of the Vice President ===
It is located on the ground floor, and during the Turkish era it was reserved for the assistants to the rulers. A spiral staircase was built on the eastern side to connect it to the governor-general's office on the first floor. After independence, the office was allocated to one of the members of the Sovereignty Council, and later turned into an office for the vice president.

=== Leadership of the Republican Guard ===
The palace has a military force known as the Republican Guard, which protects it in addition to other ceremonial tasks, such as organising a parade of honour during the reception of visitors to the country from heads of state and during the ceremonies for ambassadors of foreign countries to present their credentials to the president of Sudan. The Republican Guard was established on 15 October 1960, who can be seen standing in front of the palace gates permanently in a ceremonial guard line, in addition to carrying out a replacement process for the guards in front of the palace and in the presence of a number of visitors, tourists or the public.

=== Administration ===
The palace is affiliated administratively to the Ministry of Presidential Affairs, which is headed by a minister and includes several specialised departments, such as the Department of Protocol, Information, Legal Affairs, Administrative and Financial Affairs, and the press office of the head of state.

=== Residences ===
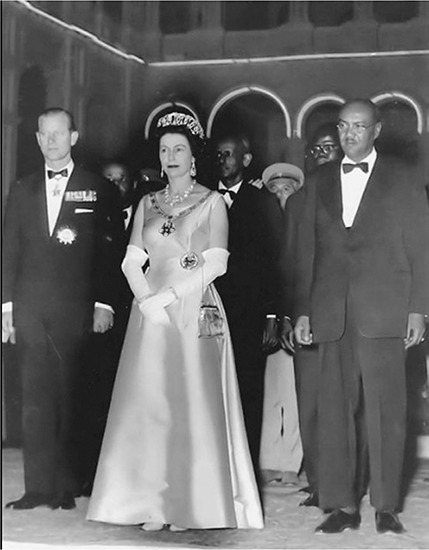
Queen Elizabeth II during her visit to Sudan in February 1965. Left to her is Prince Philip, Duke of Edinburgh, on her right is El-Tigani el-Mahi and behind her is Abdel Halim Mohamed

The residential sections are located on the second floor. It consists of three wings, one towards the east, another in the middle, and a third to the west. It includes a large hall, several bedrooms, dining rooms, and ancillary facilities. During the periods of Turkish rule and British rule, it was used as a residence for the ruler and his family, and after independence, it was completely allocated for the residence of state guests from other heads of state visiting Sudan. Among those who resided there were Queen Elizabeth II in 1965, Emperor Haile Selassie of Ethiopia, Egyptian president Gamal Abdel Nasser, and the president of Yugoslavia, Joseph Broz Tito in 1962.

=== Reception hall ===
It is considered one of the oldest sections of the palace, which was built during the construction of the palace in 1832, before many repairs and changes to its interior decoration were made to its building. It was used in the past as a hall for celebrations held by the British Governor-General in the period between 1900 and 1955, in addition to being used as a dance hall. After independence, the hall, which became known as the "Presidential Salon", was transformed. It was used to receive the guests of the head of state, and ceremonies for presenting the credentials of state ambassadors to the head of state took place before it was transformed into the new presidential palace.

=== Meeting room ===
This hall was converted after the reconstruction of the palace in 1900 into a place of worship in the form of a small English church inside the palace. When a large church was built in the eastern part of the palace garden, Sir Wingat Pasha, Governor-General of Sudan (1901–1916) transferred the presidential office. To it, he built the spiral staircase that connects the presidential office to the secretarial office on the ground floor. During the era of Sir Lee Stack, Governor-General of Sudan (1916–1924), the office of the governor-general was transferred from the hall to the office of the current president of the Republic, and the hall was converted into a meeting hall.

=== Conference hall ===
In the past, it was used as a room for official banquets held by the governor-general, and it remained the same after independence until it was transformed into a hall for press conferences in 1977. It has been re-equipped to be used as a hall for official meetings and press conferences.

=== Palace staff ===
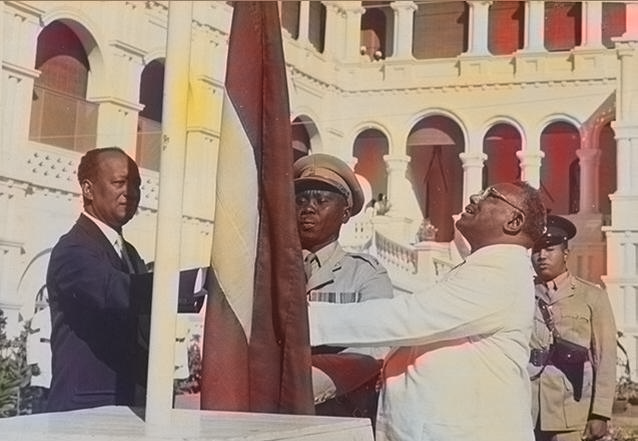
Sudan's flag raised at independence ceremony by the prime minister Isma'il Alazhari and opposition leader Muhammad Ahmad Mahgoub on 1 January 1956, photo by Gadalla Gubara

It is based on the highest roof of the palace on the second floor, and it consisted, at the beginning of the construction of the palace, of a single column bearing the red Turkish-Egyptian Khedive flag with crescents and three white stars, to symbolise the Supreme Gate of the Ottoman Empire and the Islamic caliphate over the country of Sudan, on behalf of his agent, the Khedive of Egypt.

After rebuilding the palace which was destroyed during the Mahdist revolution and the return of the Anglo-Egyptian rule, the mast became composed of two columns symbolising the dual rule, one of which bears the Egyptian royal flag of green colour, the white crescent and the three white stars, which symbolise Egypt, Sinai and Sudan. In addition to the blue British Union Jack and its red and white crosses horizontally, vertically and transversely.

On Sunday the first of January 1956, a third column was added to the mast between the two columns, and the flags of the Condominium were lowered, and at the same moment the flag of Sudan's independence was raised in the middle column, with its blue, yellow, and green colours to symbolise national sovereignty. The other two columns were kept without any flag or any piece of cloth on them. To symbolise their status, the evacuation of the colonial administration from Sudan once and for all.

=== General Gordon's Last Stand's staircase ===
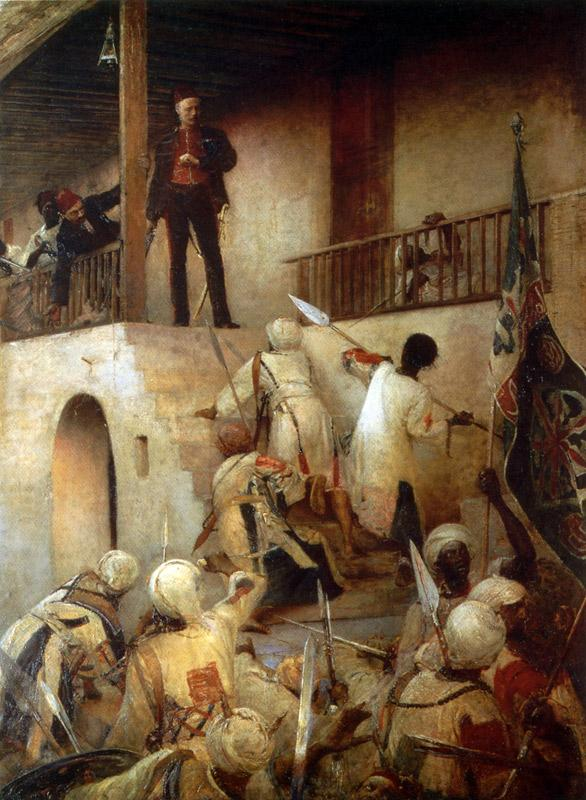
General Gordon's Last Stand, 1893 painted by George W. Joy

It is one of the most famous parts of the palace, due to its appearance on an oil painting by George W. Joy telling the death of Gordon Pasha, which is currently in the Leeds City Museum. General Gordon Pasha, Governor-General of Sudan, lived on the first floor in the western wing of the main building of the palace when the Mahdi supporters invaded the city of Khartoum during the Mahdist revolution. On 26 January 1884, a group of them stormed the palace, Gordon was standing on the internal stairs leading to the sitting room. On the steps of this ladder, Gordon was killed, and that was the end of the Turkish rule over Sudan and an indication of the establishment of the national Mahdist state, which chose the city of Omdurman, near Khartoum, as the new capital of the country.

The palace was rebuilt in 1900 and the administration of the Anglo-Egyptian Condominium assumed the helm of governance in the country; the ladder found great interest by the British rulers and later visitors to the palace, many of whom are keen to see it for its archaeological value.

=== Museum ===
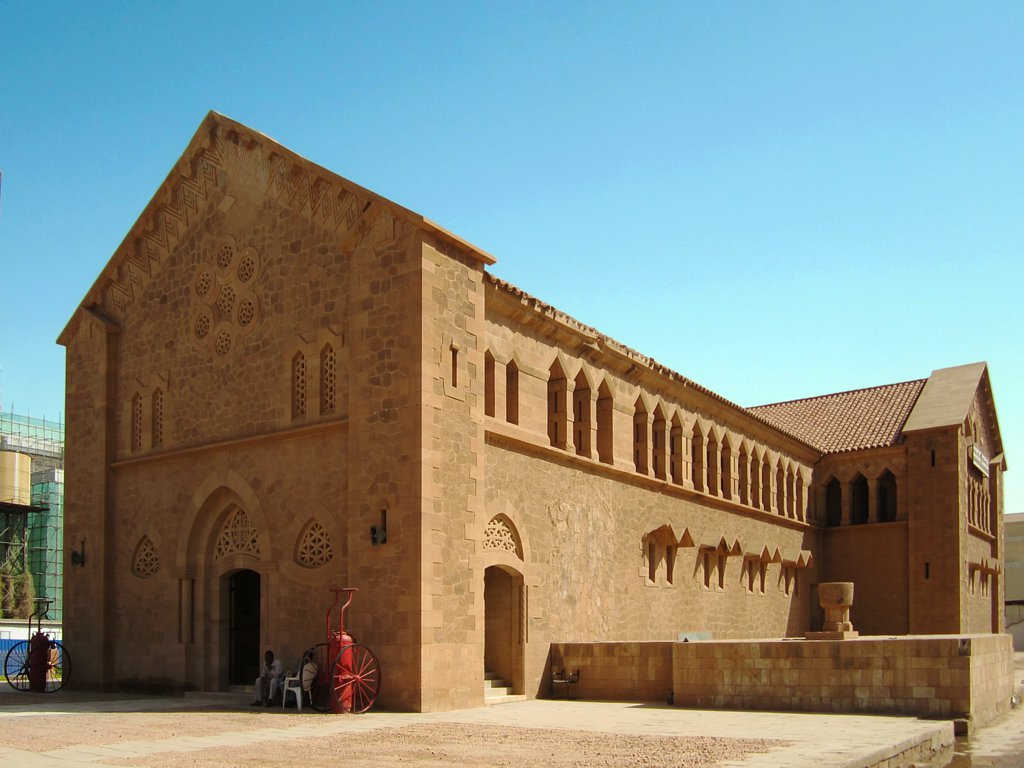
Republican Palace Museum in 2013

The Republican Palace Museum is located inside the palace wall in the southeastern part of it overlooking University Street. The building was once an Anglican Cathedral. The All Saints Cathedral was built by Reginald Wingate in 1912.

The cathedral building, in which the museum's collections are displayed, is in itself a historical relic that represents Byzantine architecture through its bell tower (which has been removed), and its holdings and exhibits includes presidential vehicles and cars that were used by the rulers of Sudan, oil paintings and photographs of them. In addition, its also includes presidential gifts that were given to them, musical instruments, utensils, and pieces of furniture that were used inside the presidential palace in previous eras, and other archaeological and memorial objects related to the palace and its former residents. The museum was officially opened on 31 December 1999, and it is one of three parts of the complex that is open to the public, including the Library and Mosque.

=== Gardens ===
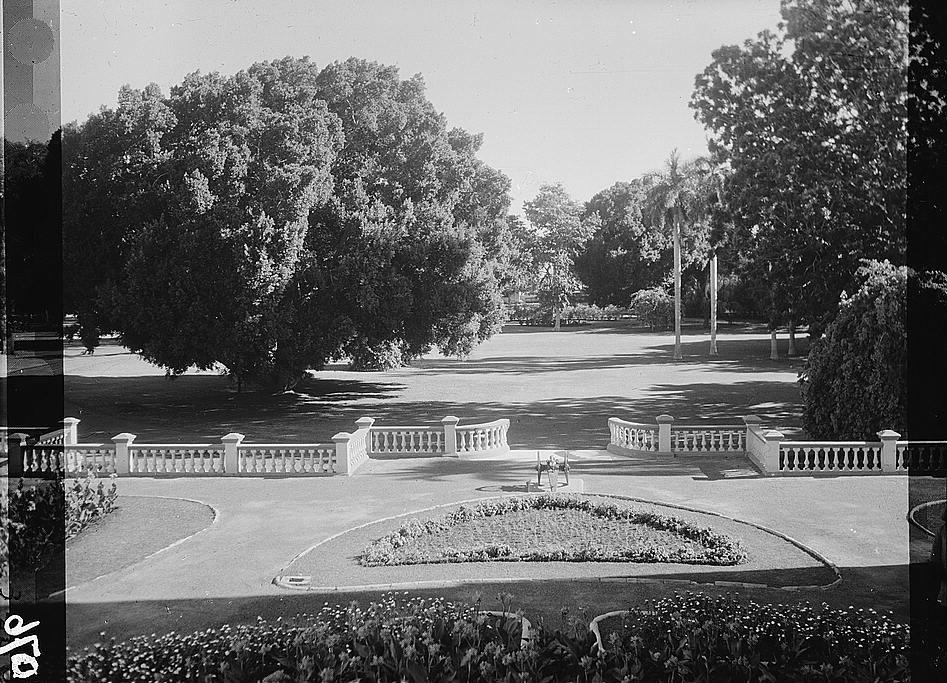
Palace gardens in 1936

One of the old parts of the palace, as it was established with the palace during the Turkish era, and several improvements were made to it, especially during the reign of General Kitchener, the governor-general of Sudan, who was so interested in it that he brought experts from Europe to develop it until it became one of the most important gardens in Sudan. The garden contains various plants and trees, including trees imported from abroad and settled in Sudan, such as mango trees known as Mango Kitchener. The area of the garden is about 50,000 m^{2} (540,000 sq ft).

=== Library ===
Although the palace received large quantities of books and literature, especially during the period of the dual rule in 1898. There was no library for preserving books or classifying them, which were deposited in the ceremonial department in the palace. In 1976, it was decided to collect the books in the palace and keep them in a library for which a room was allocated in the main building of the palace. The library was provided with collections of books and various references in 1988 and 2006. The library was moved to the southeastern part of the palace building to make room for the vice president's office. A reading hall was added to it to serve its visitors and an archive consisting of two halls, one for storing documents and the other for display. The library is open to the public.

=== Mosque ===
Abdallah al-Fadil al-Mahdi is credited with establishing the mosque in the Republican Palace during his membership in the Sudanese Sovereignty Council (1965–1969). The mosque is located inside the palace wall in the south-eastern part of it overlooking University Street and the Martyrs Square. The mosque is also open to the public during prayers time.

== Significance ==
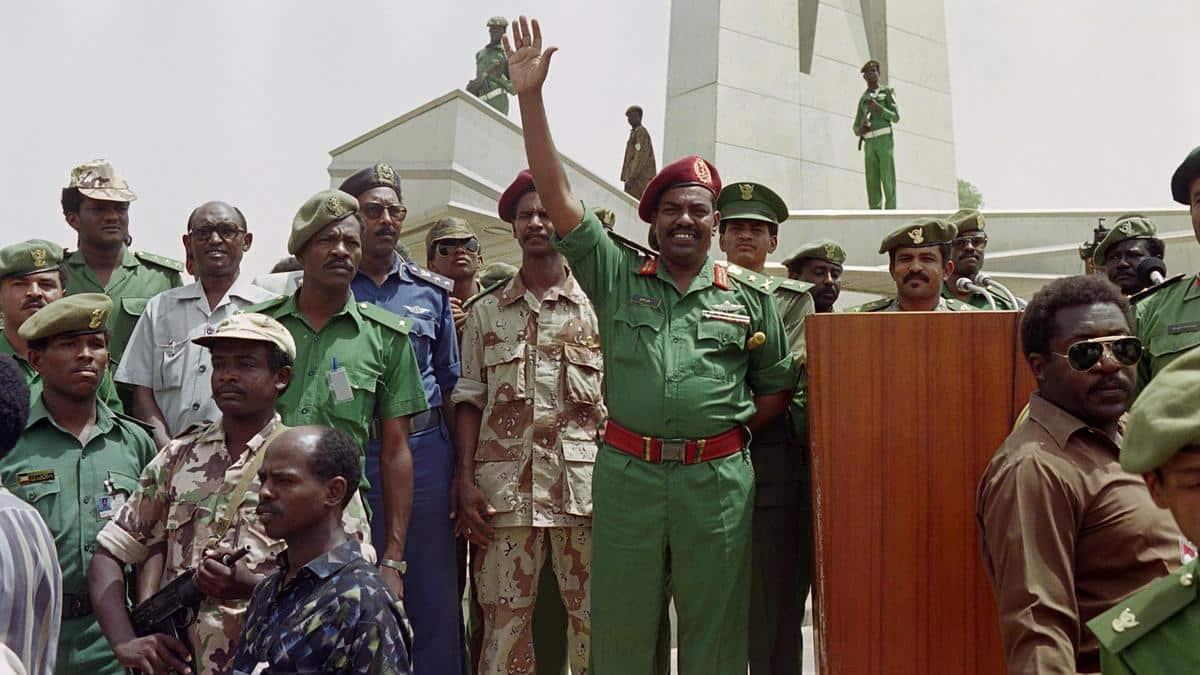
Brigadier General Omar al-Bashir (centre) and Abdel Rahim Mohammed Hussein (blue fatigue) in front of the Republican Palace after the 1989 coup d'état

In addition to its role as the official residence of the president, the Republican Palace has also been used for hospitality and to receive guests. The palace has hosted many important figures from around the world over the years, including heads of state, diplomats, and other dignitaries. The Sudanese Republican Palace is a political symbol in Sudan. Ceremonies for presenting credentials to ambassadors of foreign countries, and official country ceremonies take place in the Palace. Postage stamps and banknotes carried its image, which permeates scenes and images of media releases in the country.

The palace has been the site of many historic events over the years including the Independence of Sudan and rising of the republic flag. For example, in 1969, the palace was the location of a military coup that brought General Gaafar Nimeiry to power. In 1985, the palace was the site of another military coup that overthrew Nimeiry and installed a civilian government. The palace has also been the site of important international meetings and events, such as the Arab League summit in 1967, and is famous for its Khartoum Resolution known as "The Three No's"; No peace with Israel, no recognition of Israel, no negotiations with Israel.

In April 2019, the Sudanese military overthrew then-President Omar al-Bashir and the palace came under the control of the Transitional Military Council and its successor, the Transitional Sovereignty Council. Between April 2023 and March 2025 during the Sudanese civil war (2023–present), the Rapid Support Forces (RSF) had control of the Republican Palace and other key facilities across various regions of Sudan, including the main airport of the capital city. The RSF is a paramilitary organization that was formed during the War in Darfur and has since become a powerful force in the country.
