= Sudan Memory =

Sudanese cultural project

- Type: Cultural institution
- Legal status: Nonprofit organization
- Headquarters: Khartoum, Sudan
- Products: digital records and information on Sudan's cultural heritage
- Official language: Arabic; English
- Website: https://www.sudanmemory.org

Sudan Memory is an online archive and cultural heritage project, provided by an international group of partners with the aim of conserving and promoting Sudanese cultural heritage. In the course of the project, digital reproductions of books and newspapers, photographs and films, visual art and architecture, as well as of other cultural objects in Sudan were created and published on the project's website.

According to Sudan Memory's website, available in English and Arabic, its activities relate to the history and culture of Sudan. This has been achieved through cooperation between Sudanese and British organizations with the aim of organizing, archiving and thereby safeguarding documents and other media in danger of being lost. These activities include the acquisition of technical material, training of staff in digitizing media and providing online access for the general public in Sudan and worldwide.

== Background ==
One of the geographically largest countries in Africa with about 43 million people, numerous ethnic groups and more than 100 native languages and dialects, Sudan's history is rich with diverse cultural and documentary heritage that has been preserved in numerous private and public collections all over the country. These collections comprise different cultural practices and traditions, as well as many documents and other media of historical events. Because of various factors, ranging from the high temperatures and the intrusion of sand, economic and political restrictions to the lack of adequate technology and training, archives in Sudan are at risk of being lost for future generations and the country's cultural heritage in general.

One of the participating organizations, the Sudan National Film Archive is one of the largest audiovisual archives in the African continent. According to Sudan Memory's aims, parts of the collections from numerous such institutions have been digitized since July 2018, including the National Film Archive, the National Museum, the University of Khartoum library in Sudan, as well as the National Archives in South Sudan. A centre for digitization was established in Khartoum and its personnel were trained.

Funding has been provided by a number of international partners, notably the British Council's Cultural Protection Fund and ALIPH, the International Alliance for the Protection of Cultural Heritage in Conflict Areas and the Government of the United Kingdom's Department for Digital, Culture, Media & Sport. The leading partners in Sudan are the National Records Office of Sudan (NRO) and the Sudanese Association for Archiving Knowledge (SUDAAK), an NGO aiming at the protection and promotion of Sudanese culture and information through archives. King's College London provided the overall management of the project, working with a large number of local Sudanese and international members of the project team.

== Media and themes ==
The media and topics covered in Sudan Memory date from the 16th century up to the Sudanese revolution of 2019. An overview of different topics and themes, ranging from advertising and agriculture, to women and workers, allows thematical browsing. Highlights from the collection relate to political history, music and festivals, visual art and architecture, public health and medicinal plants, airline timetables, Muslim, Christian and Jewish communities, Sufi traditions, natural history, newspapers, radio and television, vernacular languages and different ethnic groups, food and dress, agriculture and animal husbandry.

A special collection of Arabic manuscripts, letters and images relates to the Mahdist State (1885 -1899) and includes a letter by Rudolf von Slatin, former Governor of Darfur, to al-Ṭāhir al-Majdhūb, the leader of the Sufi brotherhood of the Majdhūbiyya in Eastern Sudan. The largest photographic archive, Rashid Mahdi's Photo Studio in Atbara, the historical centre of Sudan Railways and Workers' Movement, is featured with hundreds of photographs documenting the region's private, public and economic history from the 1940s to 1990s. Gadalla Gubara (1920–2008), Sudan's internationally most well-known photographer and filmmaker, is featured working in his own studio Gad.

Sharhabil Ahmed, one of Sudan's most popular musicians since the 1960s, provided photographs of his concerts in national and international venues, including the members of his different bands with his wife Zakia as Sudan's first female bass player. Further, record covers of the famous Al-Balabil female musical group and photographs of other popular musicians like Abdel Gadir Salim, as well as of traditional musicians and musical events, have been added by collectors and Habibi Funk Records, a record label that has reissued digital versions of popular music of Sudan.

== Institutions for cultural heritage in Sudan and South Sudan ==
Institutions for collecting, research and the promotion of the country's long cultural history and many archaeological treasures include the National Museum of Sudan, the Sudan Ethnographic Museum, the Khalifa House Museum and Bramble House in Omdurman, the Sheikan Museum in El-Obeid, North Kordofan and the Darfur Women's Museum in Nyala, South Darfur. They are overseen by the National Corporation for Antiquities and Museums (NCAM) and the Western Sudan Community Museums (WSCM) project, funded by some of the same organizations as for Sudan Memory. They have been providing expertise and funding in order to restore these museums and their collections in a sustainable way. In a similar way, the WSCM project aims "to safeguard the heritage the museums represent and promote their role as civic spaces for community use, education and cultural events that promote peace and understanding within the complex societies of modern Sudan."

In South Sudan, the National Archive Project has been conserving, reordering, cataloguing and digitizing the historical government records and other documents going back to colonial times. Pending the construction of a future South Sudan National Archive building, various international donors have been supporting these efforts. Aiming at wide accessibility to the general public in South Sudan and beyond, the project has been managed by the Rift Valley Institute.

== Other online cultural archives ==
The Rift Valley Institute maintains an expanding open-access digital library, the Sudan Open Archive, available online and on disk, comprising historical and contemporary books, documents and audio-visual media. Historical photographs of Sudan are also available online from a number of international collections, such as Durham University (photographs and documents), and the Pitt Rivers Museum, Oxford, both of whom are also contributors to Sudan Memory, or the Museum of Ethnology in Vienna (for historical photographs by Richard Buchta, an Austrian explorer and early photographer in 19th-century Turkish-Egyptian Sudan).

== Critical reception ==
In her essay The Sudanese gaze: Visual memory in post-independence Sudan Sudanese-American writer Dalia Elhassan discussed the complex relationships that historical photographs and films from Sudan play in constructing knowledge about this East African country. Accordingly, both for people like herself living in the Sudanese diaspora, as well as for Sudanese at home and of different generations, these images "captured by a Sudanese lens, a Sudanese gaze" relate directly to questions of cultural identity, blackness, history and their perceptions in Sudanese literature, visual arts and the media.

While the photographers themselves cannot live on, it is the stories, the visual memories safeguarded in their photographs that remain alive: a time in Sudan that, despite every effort being made to blur it from national consciousness, can sharpen into view upon a single glance of any photograph captured through the Sudanese gaze.

— Dalia Elhassan, The Sudanese gaze: Visual memory in post-independence Sudan

== See also ==
- History of Sudan
- Culture of Sudan
- Cinema of Sudan
- Photography in Sudan
- Visual Arts of Sudan
- Architecture of Sudan
- Sudanese Literature
