= Andreas Kronenberg =

Austrian social anthropologist (1931–2016)

Andreas Kronenberg (30 September 1931 – 6 January 2016) was an Austrian social anthropologist, active as researcher in North Africa and Sudan, and later as professor for his academic field with a special focus on Africa at the University of Frankfurt/Main. He published social anthropological studies, mainly based on his field work, including participant observation, during the 1950s in French Algeria, French Equatorial Africa, and in the early years of the Republic of Sudan.

== Biography ==
Kronenberg was born to an Austrian father and a Polish mother in Tarnów, Poland, and grew up speaking both his parents' languages. During World War II, the family moved to Vienna. From 1949 to 1955, he studied ethnology, African studies and geography at the University of Vienna and earned his PhD in 1955 on The Teda of Tibesti. During this time, he traveled to French Algeria to undertake ethnological fieldwork on the Tuareg, as well as to French Equatorial Africa, present-day's Republic of Chad, for fieldwork on the Teda group of the Toubou people. In his research on the kinship structures of the Teda people, he was influenced by the notions of social anthropology as elaborated by Alfred Radcliffe-Brown.

After his PhD, Kronenberg worked in the Musée de l'homme in Paris, and from 1957, as Government Anthropologist in the newly independent Republic of the Sudan, where he shared ethnographic work with his wife Waltraud Kronenberg, also with a PhD in social anthropology. At the University of Khartoum, they met with British colleagues, such as Ian Cunnison, Farnham Rehfish and Neville Dyson-Hudson, whose approach to social anthropology they shared. For the Museum of Ethnography in Khartoum, they collected Bongo grave sculptures and other objects. Preceding the construction of the Aswan Dam and the subsequent resettlement of Nubian populations affected by the flooding of their land, he was commissioned by the Sudanese government to produce studies on the effects of these resettlements as "applied anthropologist". Further fieldwork on the Didinga and Logarim peoples in Eastern Equatoria in southern Sudan was published in his post-doc thesis.

From 1965 to 1969, Kronenberg worked as research assistant at the Frobenius-Institute in Frankfurt/Main, Germany. In 1969, he started writing his Habilitation under Eike Haberland at the University of Frankfurt/Main and published his thesis Logics and Life. Cultural Relevance of the Didinga and Logarim, Sudan in German in 1972. In this work, he applied the binary number system (logics) to the kinship structures (life) of the Didinga. He claimed that this system had already been used in ancient Egypt, and this led him to ask questions about the cultural origin of the mathematical nature of kinship structures along the Nile. In 1970, he became full professor at the Department of Social Anthropology in Frankfurt. In several of their publications, he and his wife published further studies in English or German based on their fieldwork in Sudan, notably on the Nyimang-Nuba, Jo Luo, Bongo and other peoples. Further, they translated and edited two volumes of folk tales, one of the Jo Luo and the other one of Nubian peoples in German.

Based on his professional contacts and emphasis on participant observation, Kronenberg invited British and American social anthropologists, such as E. E. Evans-Pritchard, Godfrey Lienhardt and John F. M. Middleton for guest lectures at his department in the 1980s and '90s. He retired from the university in 1993 and lived the rest of his life on the island of Corsica.
