= Mabel Esplin =

Stained glass artist (1874–1921)

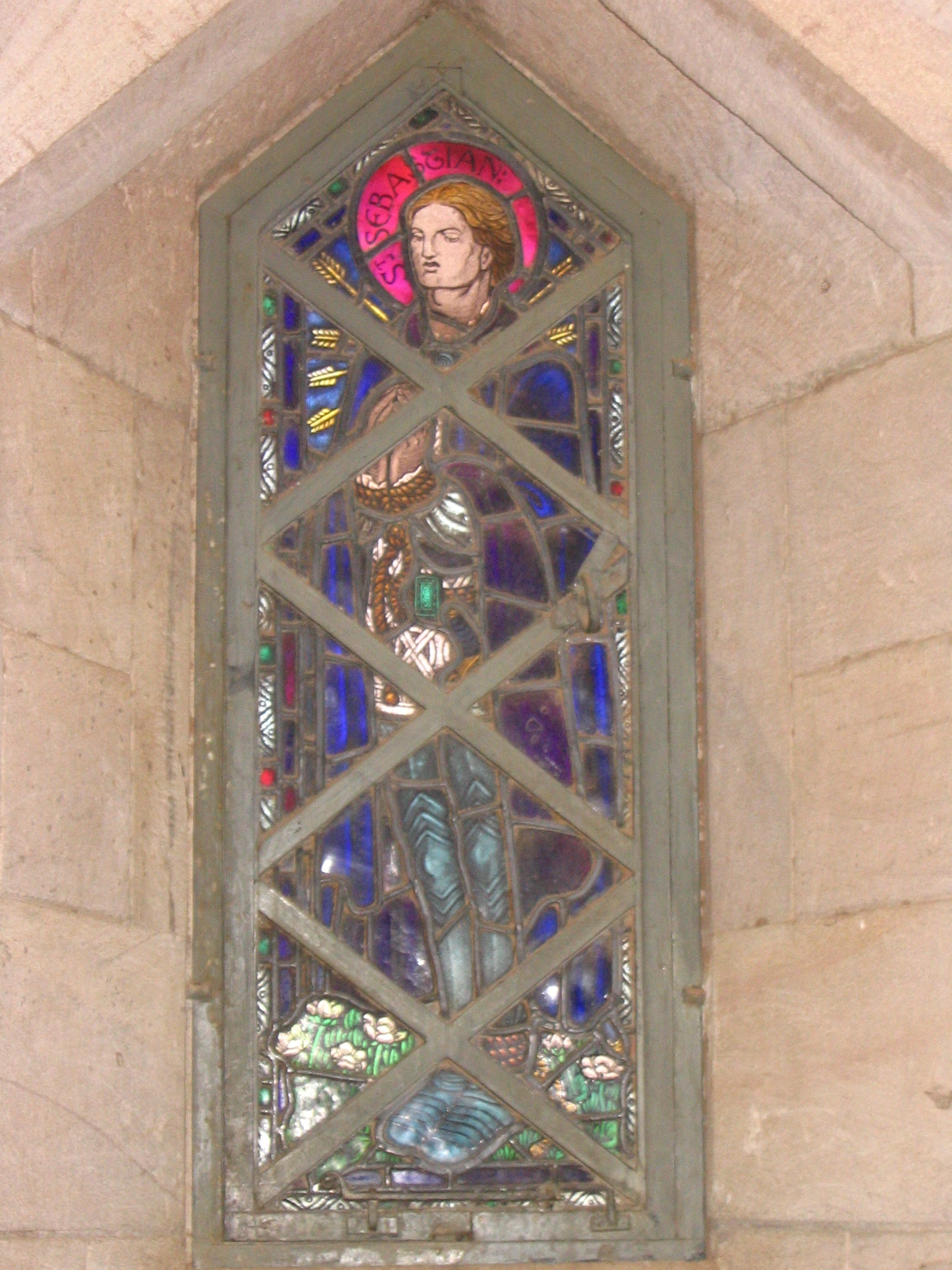
- St Sebastian
- Born: 1874; Chorlton, Lancashire, England
- Died: 1921 (aged 46–47); Haydock, Lancashire, England
- Education: Central School of Art and Design; trained under and assisted Christopher Whall and Karl Parsons
- Known for: Stained Glass. Painting
- Notable work: See listing below.

Mabel Esplin (1874–1921) was an English stained glass artist.

== Life ==
Esplin was born in Chorlton, Manchester to a wealthy furniture manufacturer in 1874. He provided the financial backing for her to go to the Slade School of Fine Art and the London County Council (LCC) Central School of Arts and Crafts, which she attended from about 1906 to 1910 and where she was taught by Karl Parsons, stained glass artist Christopher Whall and stained glass artist Alfred J. Drury of Lowndes and Drury.

Although she primarily created stained-glass works, Esplin also painted murals. Her largest commission was for All Saint's Cathedral, Khartoum, Sudan.

Esplin was also active in the Women's Suffrage Movement.

== Career ==
=== Murals ===
Mabel executed 3 mural panels at Christ Church in Spitalfields in the East End of London.

=== Stained glass ===
All her stained glass was made in collaboration with Lowndes and Drury at the Glass House in Fulham. Apart from work detailed below, The Stained Glass Museum have a sample of her work although they add that it may have been the work of Joan Fulleylove.

==== All Saints' Cathedral, Khartoum ====
By 1912 Esplin had finished seven stained glass windows for the Anglican All Saints' Cathedral in Khartoum.

In 1911 she was to design seven lancet windows and in 1912 lancet windows for the north wall of the north transept (The Gordon Memorial Chapel) which depicted St Edmund, St Theodore and St Sebastian. She also completed in that year a three-light window for the Gordon Memorial Chapel with the theme "Hope, Faith and Charity". 1914 saw her complete a circular West window for the South Transept and a circular East window depicting "Death and Resurrection" and another three-light window in the Gordon Memorial Chapel with the theme "Fortitude, Justice and Wisdom". In one window and in an attempt to introduce local colour, the figure of Balthazar was portrayed in the costume of a Sudanese Sheikh.

Due to her ill health, Mabel was unable to complete the Khartoum commission and remaining windows were carried out by Joan Fulleylove who had earlier worked as Mabel's assistant. (Note: One such window was made 1919/20 entitled "Patience, Temperance and Chastity". Fulleylove also designed a three-light window for St Mary's Church in Fulham.)

Khartoum Cathedral was confiscated by the Sudan government in 1971 and the church's tower knocked down in October 1996. The cathedral was turned into a museum which was named the Republican Palace Museum and opened in the year 2000. The museum has left the stained glass windows intact.

==== English churches ====
Mabel managed work for two English churches, St John the Divine, Richmond, Surrey and St Anne’s, Lewes, Sussex. At St John the Divine she executed two single light windows for the Chancel in 1912, one entitled "Spes" and the other "Mater Dolorosa". She worked at St Anne's, Lewes, in 1913 where she completed a single light window in the North Nave depicting St Anne teaching the Blessed Virgin Mary to read.

== Exhibitions of her work ==
- 1985–1986 – William Morris Gallery: Women's Stained Glass Artists

== Personal life ==
She was an active member of the Women's Suffrage Movement and assisted in the activities of the 1909 International Alliance of Women (IWSA) Congress at Albert Hall in London.

In 1916 she suffered a serious mental breakdown and was unable to continue her work in stained glass. She died in a nursing home at Haydock in Lancashire on 30 April 1921.

== Gallery of images ==
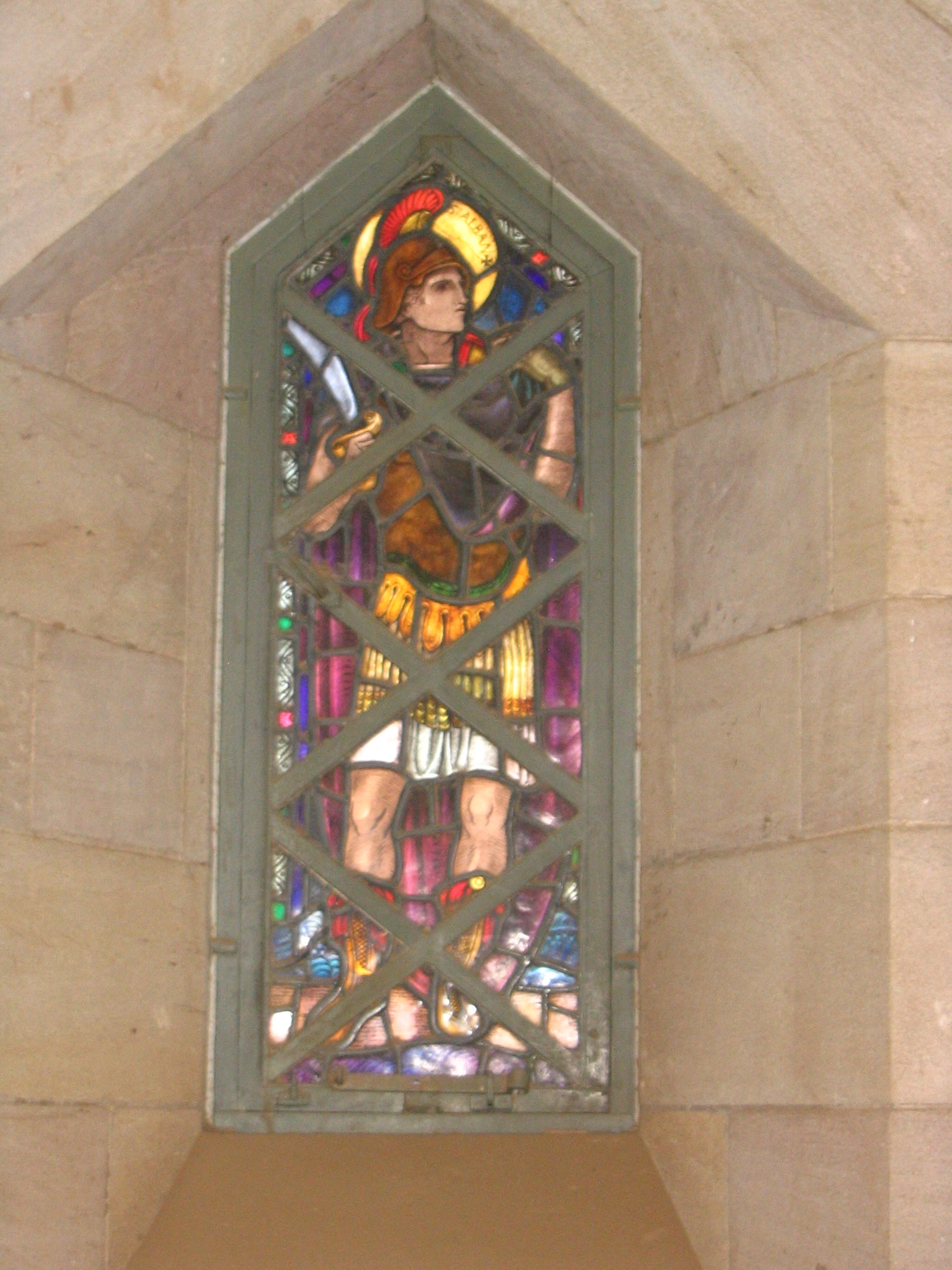
St Alban window in Khartoum. Image shown courtesy of Thomas Reuben James

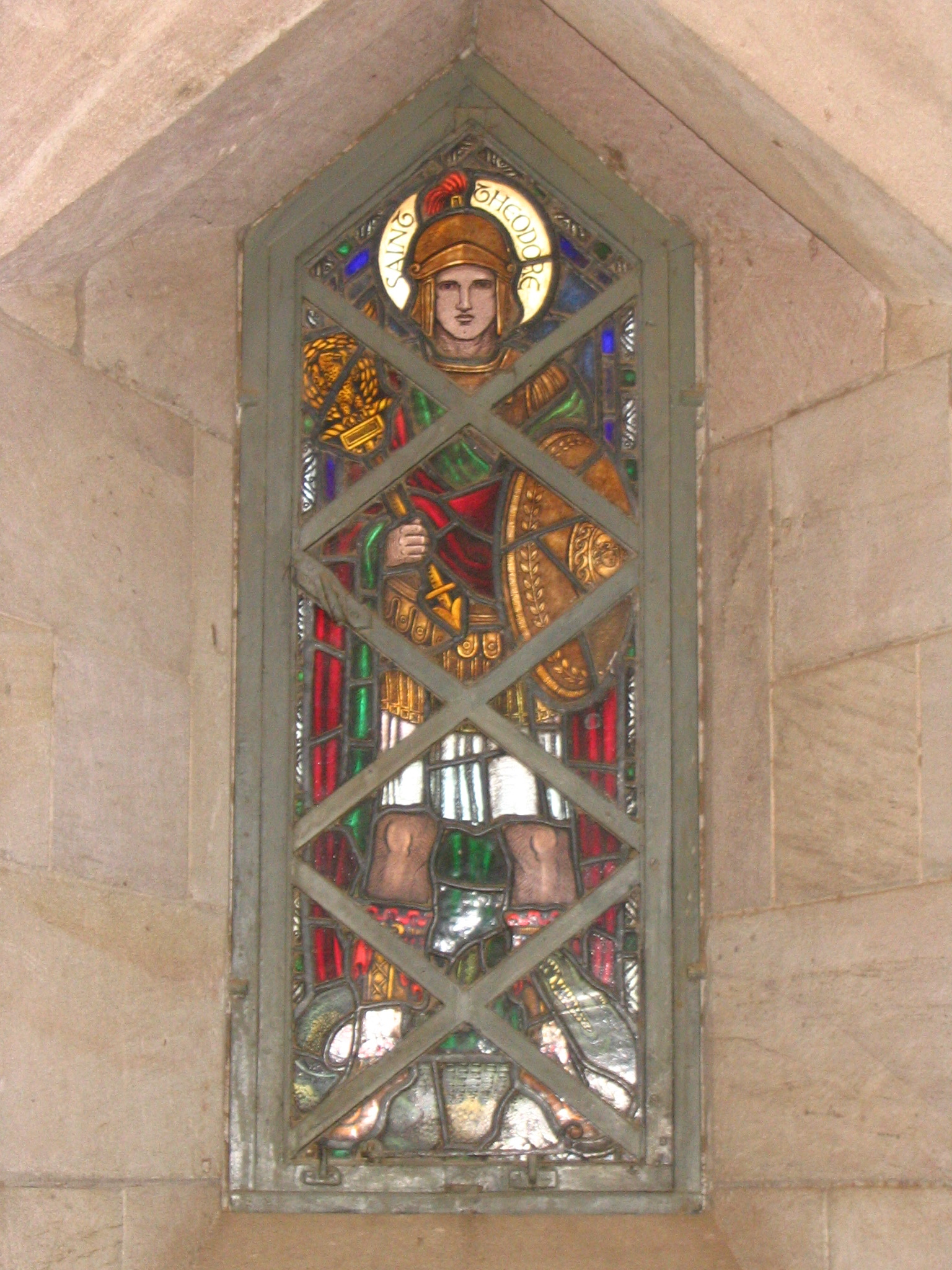
St Theodore window in Khartoum. Image shown courtesy of Thomas Reuben James

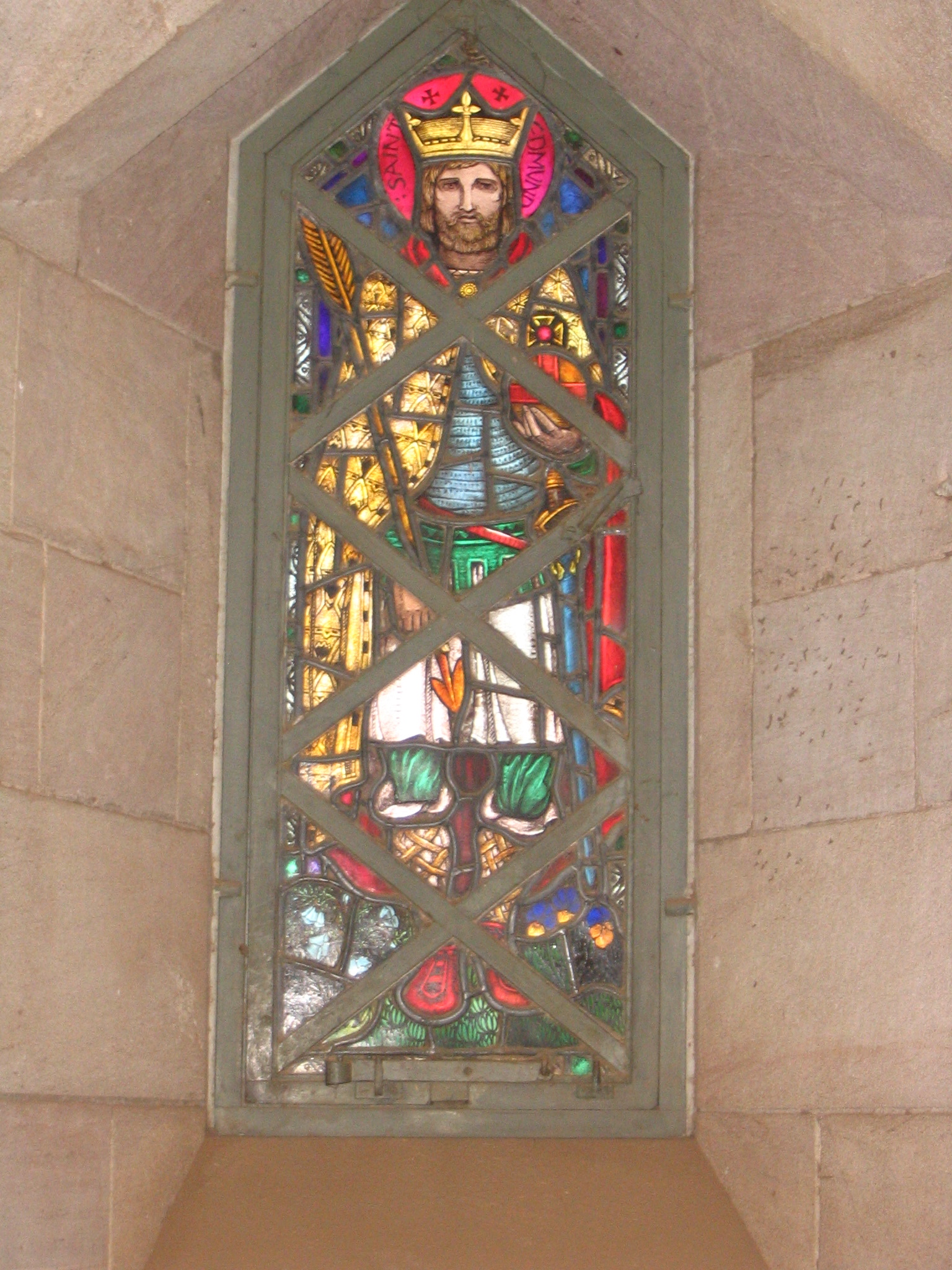
St Edmund window in Khartoum Cathedral. Image shown courtesy of Thomas Reuben James
