= Sudan Library =

National library of Sudan

- مكتبة السودان
- 15.61208635224787°N 32.54241783400509°E
- Location: Khartoum, Sudan
- Type: research library, national library

Collection
- Legal deposit: Yes

Other information
- Affiliation: University of Khartoum

The Sudan Library is a section of the library of the University of Khartoum. It serves as the national library of Sudan, and is also a university research library.

It is a depository of all Sudanese publications since a legal deposit act came into effect in 1966. The library also collects works of Sudanese authors and works about Sudan published abroad. Its catalogue represents a retrospective national bibliography. In 2018, the library was one of the first to contribute to the Sudan Memory Project.

The library sustained heavy damage during the Sudanese civil war.

== See also ==
- National Records Office of Sudan
