= National Records Office of Sudan =

National archives in Sudan

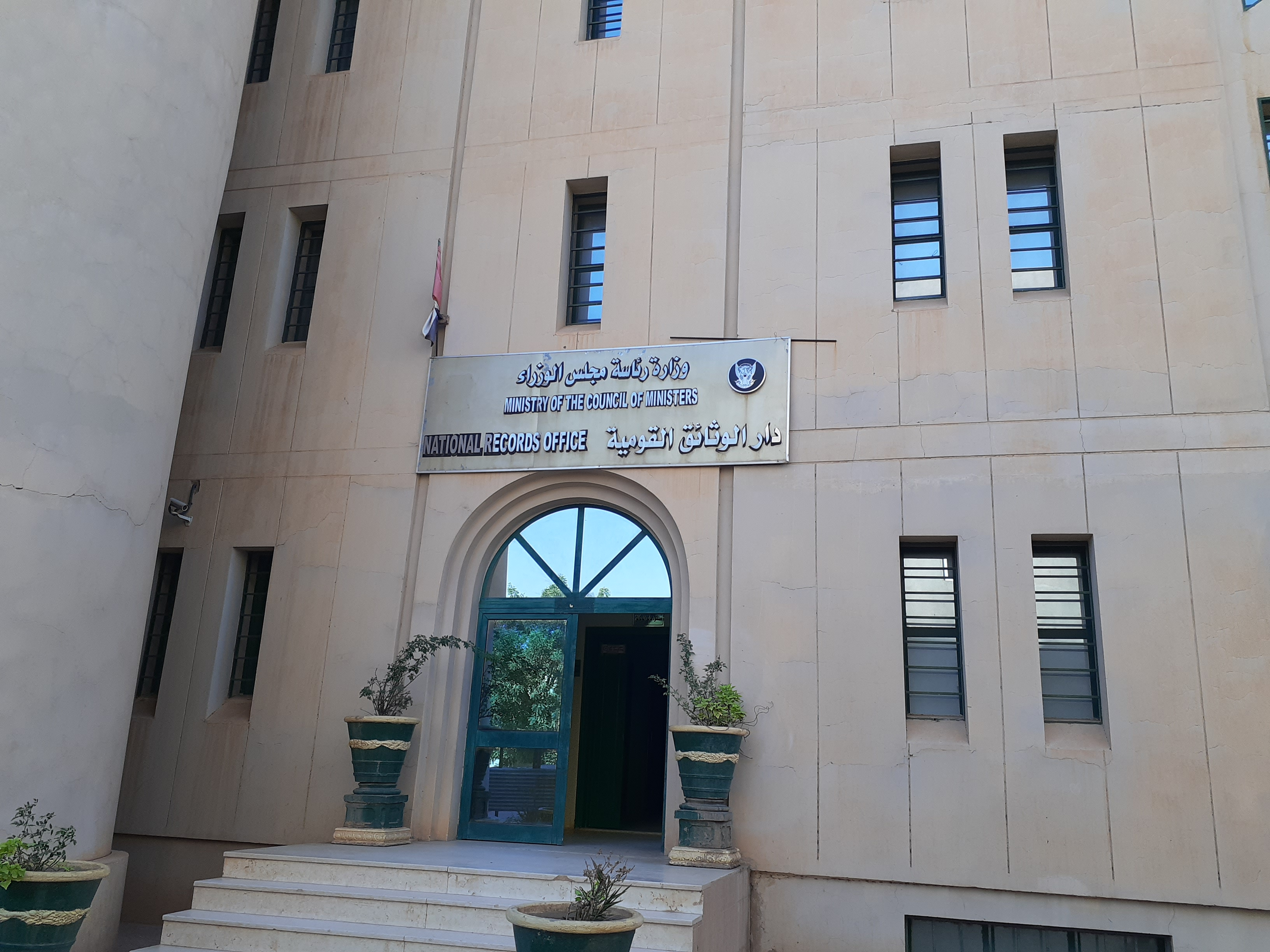
Sudanese Documents House

The National Records Office of Sudan, located in Khartoum, serves as the National Archives of Sudan. It holds 20 million documents and 13,000 volumes about the history of Sudan since 1870.

Since 2018, the National Records Office has been a leading partner of the online archive and cultural heritage project Sudan Memory. It aims to conserve and promote Sudanese cultural heritage both physically in the country itself, as well as through the Internet. Among many other documents, a collection of Arabic manuscripts, letters and images digitised at the National Records Office relates to the Mahdist State (1885 -1899). This includes a letter by Rudolf von Slatin, former Governor of Darfur, to al-Ṭāhir al-Majdhūb, the leader of the Sufi brotherhood of the Majdhūbiyya in eastern Sudan.

The archives and its collection sustained heavy damage during the Sudanese civil war, having been located near the general headquarters of the Sudanese Armed Forces which saw intense fighting during the Battle of Khartoum.

== See also ==
- Sudan Library, University of Khartoum
- List of national archives
