= Khalifa House Museum =

Ethnographic museum in Omdurman, Sudan

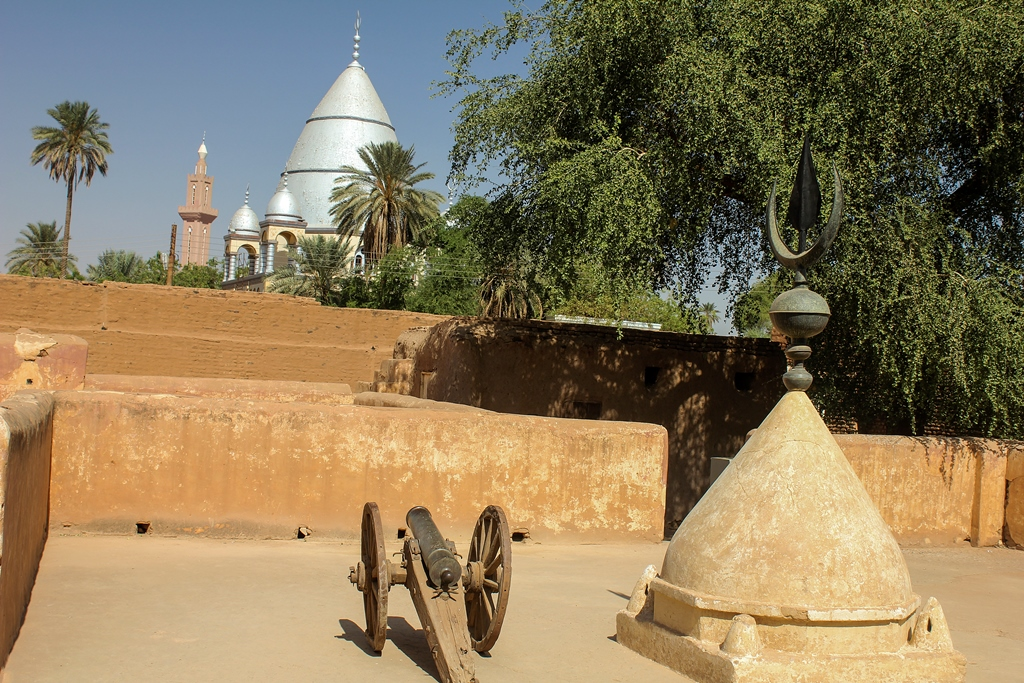
- In the foreground: Cupola of the original Mahdi's Tomb. In the background: The restored Tomb of the Mahdi.

- Situation of the Khalifa House Museum
- Established: 1928
- Location: Omdurman, Sudan
- Coordinates: 15.383°N 32.290°E
- Type: Ethnographical collection covering the Mahdiyah rule

The Khalifa House Museum is an ethnographic museum, located opposite the tomb of Muhammad Ahmad in the city of Omdurman in Sudan. Towards the end of the 19th century, it was the residence of the successor of the Mahdi, Khalifa Abdallahi ibn Muhammad and the headquarters of the administration of the Mahdi State. The House was converted into a museum in 1928 during the Anglo-Egyptian condominium.

== The historical building ==
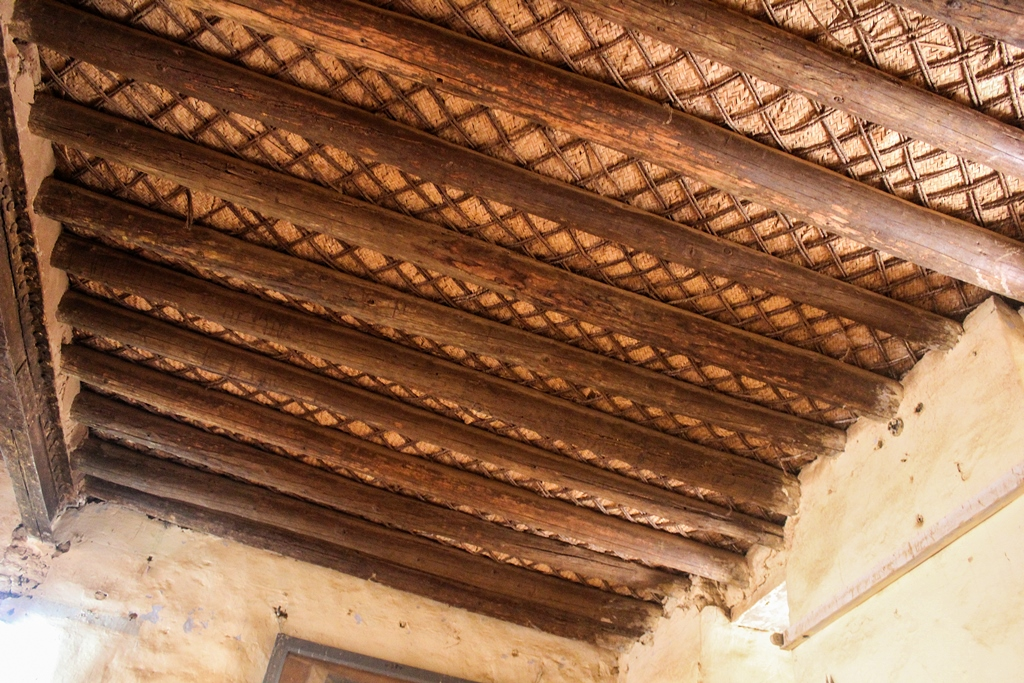
Beams and matting of the ceiling

The Khalifa House is a low, two-storied building with a series of linked courtyards. The ground floor was built in 1888 and the upper floor in 1891. Its traditional mudbrick structure is of great historical importance, since it exhibits the style and architecture prevailing at the period.

== The ethnographic museum ==
The Khalifa House Museum contains artefacts relating to the Mahdist state (1885–1898), such as suits of mail, Mahdist coins, flimsy banknotes issued by Gordon during the Siege of Khartoum, swords and personal belongings of the Khalifa. Some rooms are dedicated to the Battle of Omdurman showcasing rifles, a Maxim automatic gun, banners, spears and robes obtained from the battle field. The collection also includes photographs of Khartoum during this time and its subsequent occupation by the British.

The courtyards house other historical items, such as the cupola saved from the ruins of the original Mahdi's tomb and also the first car in Sudan, an Arrol-Johnston motor tractor.

== Restoration ==
Interview with Ikhlas Ilyas, curator at the Khalifa House in Omdurman

In 2018, the Khalifa House Museum was awarded funding by the British Council for the Western Sudan Community Museums Project. During the two-year funding period, the building and its extensive collection were restored. Staff were given training in material conservation, collection management, storage and protection of the displays. The collections were photographed and digitised, and this data was shared with another British Council Cultural Protection Funded project, Sudan Memory. This project is a British-Sudanese cooperation with the National Corporation for Antiquities and Museums (NCAM) of Sudan.

Reports in September 2024 suggested that the museum had been looted in the context of the Sudanese civil war. Among the items missing were the swords used Osman Digna and Abd al-Rahman al-Nujoumi during the Mahdist War.

== See also ==
- List of museums in Sudan
- History of Sudan - Mahdist state
