= Republican Guard (Sudan) =

Military Unit

The Sudanese Republican Guard (Arabic: الحرس الجمهورى) is a military unit of the Sudanese Armed Forces responsible for protecting the President of Sudan. It exists as a presidential security unit, which is led by Major General Khalid Hamad. The unit guards the Presidential Palace, and performs honor parades for visiting dignitaries. Members of the honor guard wear the traditional Islamic Jellabiya and a Turban as part of their full dress uniform.

== History ==
The Republican Guard was established on 15 October 1960. Its ceremonial role originated from different ceremonial units in the military's preceding Sudan Defense Force, with a force of infantry NCOs east of the Khartoum Garrison. It grew to the size of a brigade in 1992 was simultaneously commissioned a military band. In 1970, the ceremonial uniform was changed to fit modern times, adding trousers and boots to its items of clothing. In 2011, two Republican Guards were killed at the western gate of the building of the Sudanese Presidency when an unidentified assailant, whom an army spokesman called "mentally ill", attempted to intrude in the residence.

== List of commanders ==
The following have served as the commander of the Republican Guard:

- Captain Muslih Mohamed El-Amin (15 October 1960 – 5 March 1965)
- Captain Al-Tahir Ahmed Al-Labeb (5 March 1965 – 5 March 1967)
- Lieutenant Colonel Mohamed Ali Mugbil (5 March 1967 – 11 September 1968)
- Major Abdalla Ahmed Al-Yas (11 September 1968 – 30 May 1969)
- Major Osman Haj Hussein (31 May 1969 – 19 July 1971)
- Colonel Fathi Mohamed Hassan Kambal (25 November 1971 – 31 May 1972)
- Lieutenant Colonel Muslih Mohamed El-Amin (31 May 1972 – 11 January 1973)
- Colonel Badawi Al-Mabasher Al-Tayeb (11 January 1973 – 8 June 1976)
- Colonel Mohamed Al-Hassan Mansour (8 June 1976 – 5 October 1978)
- Colonel Siddik Al-Sayed Idris (6 October 1978 – 27 January 1982)
- Colonel Abdel Fattah Abdel Aziz (27 January 1982 – 6 May 1985)
- Brigadier Eissa El-Amin Kasbawi (1 June 1986 – 30 August 1988)
- Brigadier Mohamed Abul Qasim Mohamed (30 August 1988 – 7 July 1989)
- Major General Mohamed Abul Qasim Mohamed (7 July 1989 – 24 May 1995)
- Brigadier Abdel Rahman Mohamed Zein (12 September 1995 – 19 May 1997)
- Brigadier Taha Dafalla Al Zein (18 May 1997 – 24 April 1999)
- Brigadier Barakat Babikir Barakat (7 October 1999 – 21 March 2001)
- Major General Mohamed Abdel Qadir Nasr El-Din (21 March 2001 – 24 April 2002)
- Major General Mohamed Zein Al-Siddik (24 April 2002 – 12 October 2003)
- Major General Mohamed Al-Khanjar Al-Tayeb Al-Sheikh Al-Amin (12 October 2003 – 1 October 2004)
- Major General Ahmed Khaled (1 October 2004 – 26 October 2004)
- Major General Abdel Moniem Mohamed Mohamed Zein (26 October 2004 – 3 July 2007)
- Major General Shams el-Din Mohamed Mohi El-Din (3 July 2007 – 17 April 2008)
- Major General Ahmed Abdel Qayoum Osman Idris (17 April 2008 – 30 July 2008)
- Major General Salah Sid Ahmed Mohamed El-Hassan (30 July 2008 – 2009)
- Major General Khalid Hamad (2009 – present).
