= Severino Fuli =

South Sudanese political figure

- Born: Severino Fuli Boki Tombe Ga'le; 1934 (year inferred from memoir title; exact date unconfirmed)
- Died: unknown
- Other name: Severino Fuli Boki Tombe Ga'le
- Occupations: Rebel movement founder, author
- Known for: Founding member of the Anyanya movement
- Notable work: Shaping a Free Southern Sudan: Memoirs of Our Struggle 1934–1985 (2002)

Severino Fuli, more fully credited as Severino Fuli Boki Tombe Ga'le, was one of the founding members of the Anyanya, a separatist rebel movement formed in southern Sudan during the First Sudanese Civil War (1955–1972).

== Role in the Anyanya movement ==
The Anyanya was founded in 1963 by southern Sudanese politicians and military figures who opposed the Sudanese government. Its foundation took place at a meeting held at the residence of Joseph Oduho in Kampala, Uganda, on 19 August 1963. Those present included Joseph Lagu, George Akumbek, Julius Moroga, and Severino Fuli.

Sources describing the broader founding of the movement also list him alongside Joseph Oduho, Gordon Muortat Mayen, Joseph Lagu, George Akumbek, Julius Moroga, Aggrey Jaden, William Deng Nhial, and Fr. Saturnino Ohure Hilangi as founding figures of the Anyanya.

== Writing ==
Fuli is the author of a memoir, published under the name Severino Fuli Boki Tombe Ga'le:

- Shaping a Free Southern Sudan: Memoirs of Our Struggle 1934–1985 (Loa Catholic Mission Council / Paulines Publications Africa, Kolbe Press, Limuru, Kenya, 2002, 488 pp.)

The book has been cited by scholars of South Sudanese history as one of a small number of memoirs by indigenous participants in the Anyanya movement, alongside Joseph Lagu's Sudan: Odyssey Through a State, From Ruin to Hope and Elijah Malok Aleng's The Southern Sudan: Struggle for Liberty. A review in African Arguments notes that while Lagu's account focuses on the overall evolution of the Anyanya, Fuli's memoir sheds light on behind-the-scenes activities in Uganda and on the ground during the struggle. The work has subsequently been cited as a primary source in academic studies of South Sudanese history, including Duke University Press's Chosen Peoples: Christianity and Political Imagination in South Sudan and other South Sudan-related research.

== Publications ==
- Ga'le, Severino Fuli Boki Tombe. Shaping a Free Southern Sudan: Memoirs of Our Struggle 1934–1985. Loa Catholic Mission Council / Paulines Publications Africa: Kolbe Press, Limuru, Kenya, 2002.
