= Azania Liberation Front =

Former rebel faction in Sudan

- Flag of the Azania Liberation Front and the first Provisional Government of South Sudan (SSNPG) (Note: The flag was designed by Saturnino Ohure)
- Leaders: Joseph Oduho; Sanus Aggrey Jaden
- Dates active: February 1965 – July 1970
- Active regions: Sudan
- Ideology: Southern Sudanese Separatism
- Part of: Liberation Movement of South Sudan
- Wars: First Sudanese Civil War

The Azania Liberation Front (ALF) was an armed rebel faction established in 1965, during the First Sudanese Civil War, by exiled members of the Sudan African National Union (SANU). It was a part of the original South Sudan Liberation Movement, the first Sudanese secessionist movement. Its name was taken from the Greek Azania, the Greek designation for the lands of East Africa south of Nubia.

== History ==
The organisation was formed after February 1965 when the SANU split into two sectors, the home and foreign. The home sector was led by William Deng Nhial, it sat in the Parliament on the issue of southern Sudan's right to self-determination. The foreign sector was directed by Aggrey Jaden Ladu, who had fled to Kampala in Uganda. In November 1964 Joseph Oduho, the first president of SANU, after losing a bid for presidency of the group to Jaden left and in so doing, split the organization. In March 1965 Oduho formed his own organization, the Azania Liberation Front; Jaden then renamed his faction of SANU loyalists, the Sudan African Liberation Front. In June of the same year the two factions reached a settlement and by the end of 1965 they had decided to reunite under as the Azania Liberation Front with Oduho as the president and Aggrey Jaden as vice president. In 1967 they headed the National Transitional Government of South Sudan (formed on August 15, 1967).

On 15 August 1967 was a called Provisional Government of Southern Sudan, SSNPG (1967–1969) chaired by Aggrey Jaden, who gave way (March 1969) to the Provisional Government of the State of the Nile. Later he had confrontations and reconciliations of the forces Anyanya Laguar that in 1969 he created his own political group, the National Organization after Anyanya (1970) Liberation Front of South Sudan (Laguar preferred first name).

Both the provisional government and the Azania Liberation Front were formally dissolved in July 1970. In 1971 the remnants joined with the Liberation Front of South Sudan, the Anyanya and other groups in the new organization Liberation Movement of South Sudan, which included almost all political organizations and the south.

The flag had three horizontal stripes, the upper and lower two were red and narrow, the central one (three times the measure of one red) was black. The stripes were separated with white fimbriations.
