= South Sudanese nationality law =

South Sudanese Nationality Act and Nationality Regulations Act

South Sudanese National Legislature
- Long title: The Nationality Act, 2011
- Enacted by: Government of South Sudan
- Passed: 7 July 2011
- Status: Current legislation

Nationality law of South Sudan is regulated by the Constitution of South Sudan, as amended; the South Sudanese Nationality Act and Nationality Regulations, and their revisions; and various international agreements to which the country is a signatory. These laws determine who is, or is eligible to be, a national of South Sudan. The legal means to acquire nationality, formal legal membership in a nation, differ from the domestic relationship of rights and obligations between a national and the nation, known as citizenship. Nationality describes the relationship of an individual to the state under international law, whereas citizenship is the domestic relationship of an individual within the nation. In South Sudan, nationality is often equated with ethnicity, despite recognition of the legal definitions. South Sudanese nationality is typically obtained under the principle of jus soli, i.e. by birth in South Sudan, or jus sanguinis, born to parents with South Sudanese ancestry. It can be granted to persons with an affiliation to the country, or to a permanent resident who has lived in the country for a given period of time through naturalization.

== Acquisition of nationality ==
Nationality can be acquired in South Sudan at birth or later in life through naturalization.

=== By birth ===
There are no statutory provisions for children born in South Sudan who would otherwise be stateless to acquire South Sudanese nationality. Those who acquire nationality automatically at birth include:

- Children born anywhere to a parent, or with a grandparent or great-grandparent, who was born in South Sudan, was a South Sudanese national, or who was ethnically a member of a group indigenous to South Sudan;
- Persons who in 2011 were either themselves domiciled in South Sudan or whose ancestors were residents of South Sudan as of 1 January 1956; or
- Foundlings or infant orphans discovered in the territory whose parents are unknown.

=== By naturalization ===
Naturalization can be granted to persons who have resided in the territory for a sufficient period of time to confirm they understand the customs and traditions of the society. General provisions are that applicants have good character and conduct; have no criminal convictions; have mental capacity or a guardian who can act on their behalf; and have resided in the country for ten years. South Sudanese nationality law has no provisions concerning whether adoptees can derive nationality through their parents. Besides foreigners meeting the criteria, other persons who may be naturalized include:

- The spouse of a South Sudanese national after a five-year residency;
- Minor children can be automatically naturalized when their parent acquires nationality; or
- Persons who have performed services for the benefit of the nation may naturalize without meeting other requirements.

== Loss of nationality ==
South Sudanese nationals can renounce their nationality pending approval by the president. Nationals may be denaturalized in South Sudan for behaving as if one is a national of another country; for working a foreign government or military of another state without government authorization; for committing disloyal acts or crimes against the state or state security; or for fraud, misrepresentation, or concealment in a naturalization petition. Re-acquisition of nationality that has been lost is not addressed in South Sudanese legislation.

== Dual nationality ==
Dual nationality has been allowed in South Sudan since its independence in 2011.

== History ==
Nationality in South Sudan followed the trajectory of Sudanese nationality law until its independence in 2011. Nationality legislation passed by the Ottoman Empire in 1869 defined persons as nationals those who owed allegiance to the empire and made provisions for the wives and children of those subjects, as well as emigrants and immigrants. With the defeat of the Ottomans by Muhammad Ahmad in 1885, an independent Mahdist State was created which lasted until defeated by an Anglo-Egyptian army in 1898. In 1899 an Anglo-Egyptian condominium was established to govern the territory, based on Turco-Egyptian precedent. Under the terms of the agreement the territory was not part of the crown's possessions, nor a protected state. Britain had no extra-territorial right to administer British subjects there and inhabitants were not British subjects. Similarly, Egyptian courts, decrees, and laws were invalid in Sudan and Ottoman sovereignty ceased. Sudanese were defined by the condominium agreement to be persons subject to the Anglo-Egyptian authority in the territory.

The Definition of Sudanese Ordinance passed on 15 July 1948, specified that stateless persons who had no nationality and were currently domiciled in Sudanese territory, who had lived or who had paternal ancestors who had been resident in Sudan since 31 December 1897 were Sudanese nationals, along with the children, wives, or widows of such persons. The Egyptian revolution of 1952 nullified the terms of the condominium and led to an Anglo-Egyptian resolution to grant Sudan self-government. Between 1953 and 1955, internal tensions escalated and the First Sudanese Civil War broke out in 1955. In the midst of the conflict, Sudan as a unitary state, gained independence on 1 January 1956. The transitional constitution of 1956 contained no provisions to define who were Sudanese, but in 1957, the Law of Sudanese Nationality (Law No. 22) was passed. Similarly to the 1948 legislation, it provided that a person acquired Sudanese nationality by birth in the territory and resident from 31 December 1897 or if his father or direct paternal ancestors had been residents in Sudan on that date. Children born after independence acquired nationality by having a Sudanese father, regardless of whether the father was Sudanese born or naturalized. Naturalization was available to persons who had continuously resided in Sudan for ten years or to wives of Sudanese husbands after a two-year residency was required. Dual nationality was prohibited. The 1957 Nationality Law was amended in 1970 (Law No. 55) and again (Law No. 47) in 1972.

=== Prelude to independence (1972–2011) ===
The Sudanese Civil War ended in 1972 with the signing of the Addis Ababa Accord granting limited autonomy to South Sudan. A new constitution was drafted in 1973, but nationality regulations were unchanged. In 1983, when the autonomy of the south was revoked, civil war reignited. The government was overthrown by a coup d'état in 1989. The military junta which had governed Sudan was replaced in 1993 by the Transitional National Assembly in 1993 and a new Provisional Nationality Act was drafted. It passed into law, as Resolution 59, and was signed by the President on 17 May 1994. The main provisions for acquisition of nationality did not change, but dual nationality was permitted, adoptees could not obtain nationality through their parents, and the residency for nationalization was reduced to five years.

Following the signing of the Khartoum Peace Agreement of 1997, a new constitution was drafted in 1998, which was intended to remove gender discrimination from the laws. Article 22 of the constitution provided that persons born to a Sudanese mother or father had an inalienable right to acquire nationality. Because the Nationality Act was not changed, a discrepancy existed between the constitutional provision for acquiring nationality maternally and the nationality law, which allowed only paternal acquisition. With the discovery of oil in South Sudan, the civil war resumed in 2001 and a laborious period of negotiation lapsed before the Machakos Protocol was signed to bring peace in 2005 in Nairobi, Kenya. The agreement provided that southern Sudan would be transitionally autonomous until a plebiscite to be held in 2011 determined if it would remain in the union or become independent. It created provisions for transitional governments to be elected and stipulated that Islamic law was not to be implemented in the south.

The 2005 Sudanese Interim National Constitution repeated the right for children to derive nationality maternally, whether born in the country or abroad, and acceptability of dual nationality. It specified that rules on naturalization were to be specified by legislation. The Nationality Law was amended that year and for the first time allowed a child to apply for nationality through their Sudanese mother, if their father was a foreigner. Unlike children born to Sudanese fathers, nationality was not automatically bestowed at birth. An Interim Constitution for southern Sudan was also drafted in 2005 to determine eligibility to vote in the referendum to consider independence, but because South Sudan was not independent the draft had no provisions for nationality. (Note: The Interim Constitution listed 63 ethnic communities that were considered to have origins in South Sudan in Schedule G. This clarification was omitted from subsequent legislation.) In 2009, the Southern Sudan Referendum Act defined eligible voters to be persons who were eighteen years old or more; had legal capacity; were registered to vote; and were either born to parents or whose ancestors had links with indigenous or ethnic communities from Southern Sudan, who had resided in southern Sudan on or before 1 January 1956, or persons who had continuously been permanent residents or whose parents or grandparents had been continuous residents since 1 January 1956. Negotiations between the north and south were to establish how nationality would be implemented after the referendum was held, but talks broke down prior to the scheduled vote.

=== Post-independence (2011–present) ===
On 9 January 2011, the result of the independence referendum was for South Sudan to secede, which would become effective with independence on 9 July. The Transitional Constitution of South Sudan was adopted in April stating in Article 45 that anyone whose parents were South Sudanese had an inalienable right to nationality. On 7 July 2011 the South Sudan Nationality Act was passed, which provided that persons who had been born in South Sudan to South Sudanese parents or whose ancestors belonged to a South Sudanese indigenous ethnic community, who were domiciled in South Sudan at independence and either was or one of his parents or grandparents has been domiciled in South Sudan on or before 1 January 1956 were conferred nationality at independence. Those born after independence acquired nationality by birth in South Sudan to parents who were South Sudanese nationals. It also allowed persons to naturalize after ten years of residency, or a five-year residency if they were the spouse of a South Sudanese national.

In 2011, South Sudan passed a Nationality Regulations Act to clarify procedures for obtaining nationality. The Regulations Act did not specify who the members of ethnic communities of South Sudan were. Instead, it provided that to prove a tie to such a group, an applicant for nationality must either provide written documentation of a link or obtain oral declarations from persons respected by the community who are considered authoritative, such as traditional or community leaders. In addition, they are required to show proficiency with Juba Arabic and have a physical appearance consistent those ethnic groups. Persons of mixed-ethnicity often have difficulty in meeting these requirements. According to a 2018 report compiled by the United Nations High Commissioner for Refugees, the government does not acknowledge persons who are Ngok Dinka from Abyei or Falata pastoralists as South Sudanese. The report also noted difficulties in obtaining nationality for women who had no male relative as a representative, and for orphans and refugees.
