= Ezboni Mondiri =

Ezboni Mondiri Gwanza was a politician in Southern Sudan. He was one of the founders of the Southern Sudan Federal Party (SSFP) in 1957, which competed in the Sudanese parliamentary election in 1958. Later he was active in secessionist movements.

== Early years ==
Ezboni Mondiri Gwanza was a student at the Faculty of Arts of the University of Khartoum, active in the Southern Student's Welfare Front. After graduating he became an official at the Shell Company.

== First democratic period ==
Sudan became independent on 1 January 1956. In 1957 Ezboni and other young intellectuals and university graduates from the south decided to found a party to advocate policies needed by the south. The founders called the party the Southern Federal Party, Federal Party and the Federalist Party. The party constitution laid out principles that included calling for an equal federation of northern and southern states, with English and Arabic given equal recognition. The state would be secular, with Islam and Christianity recognized as the two major religions but respecting other religions. The south would have a separate civil service, educational system and army.

Father Saturnino Lohure Hilangi was another founder of the Southern Sudan Federal Party (SSFP), which beat the Liberals and won forty seats in the parliamentary elections held in February and March 1958. When the SSFP spoke up in parliament for the north to consider Sudanese federation, as promised, the government arrested Mondiri and the SSFP broke up. In its place, Father Saturnino formed the Southern Block, with 25 members.

== Later career ==
The Sudanese parliament was dissolved in November 1958 after a military coup by General Ibrahim Abboud. In December 1960 Ezboni was arrested and sentenced to ten years in prison. In October 1964 General Ibrahim Abboud yielded to pressure and established a caretaker government of senior politicians to form the government until democratic elections could be held the next year. Sirr al-Katim al-Khalifa was appointed prime minister, with three southerners in his cabinet: Ezbon Mondiri Gwanza, Clement Mboro and Gordon Muortat Mayen.

The Southern Front Party, also called the Southern Professional Front, was apparently founded in Khartoum early in 1965 by a group of Southern civil servants, university students and professionals. The Southern Front was officially registered as a party in March 1965 with Gordon Abei as president, Darious Beshir as Vice President and Hilary Logali as Secretary General. In March 1965 the front nominated three senior members to take part in the caretaker cabinet: Clement Mboro Bekobo for Interior, Hilary Paul Logali for works and Gordon Muortat Mayen for communications, replacing Ezboni Mondiri.

A Round Table conference was held in March 1965 to try to resolve the southern problem. A few months later the new Southern Front Executive Committee was elected. Clement Mboro Bekobo was president, Gordon Muortat Mayen Vice President and Hilary Paul Logali Secretary General. Ezboni Mondiri was a member.

In June 1965 Joseph Oduho and his supporters defected from the Sudan African National Union (SANU) and formed a new secessionist organization called the "Azania Liberation Front" (ALF). The executive of the ALF included Joseph H. Oduho, President, Fr. Saturnino Lohure, Vice President, Ezboni Mondiri, Defense Secretary, George Akumbek Kwanai, Foreign Secretary and Joseph Lagu Yanga, Commander-in-Chief. Later Ezboni announced formation of the Sudan Azania government in exile.

On 27 February 1972 the government of Sudan and the Southern Sudan Liberation Movement (SSLM) signed the Addis Ababa agreement to end hostilities, to be formally ratified on 12 March 1972. Ezboni Mondiri Gwonza was the leader of the SSLM delegation. Dr. Mansour Khalid, Minister of Foreign Affairs, signed on behalf of the Sudan government. The agreement ended a 17-year conflict in which half a million southerners had died and many more had been displaced. The agreement gave southern Sudanese religious rights and autonomy within a federal structure for the unified Sudan. Ezboni Mondiri and Joseph Oduho were the two leading "outsider" candidates for presidency of Southern Sudan in 1973, but Abel Alier was named the SSU candidate before they could mount their challenges.
