= Kawac Makwei =

Politician of southern Sudan

Kawac Makuei Mayar Kawac is a politician from South Sudan who was a leader in the Anyanya I independence movement during the First Sudanese Civil War (1955-1972) and in the Sudan People's Liberation Movement (SPLM) during the Second Sudanese Civil War (1983-2005).

== Civil war ==
Kawac Makuei joined Anyanya I in 1963. By the time the Addis Ababa Accord of 1972 was signed he had become a major. He was one of the founders of the SPLA in 1983. He became Commander of the Jamus battalion in the SPLA. In February 1984 Colonel Kawac Makwei led a successful operation into Wathkec, on the Mouth of the Jonglei Canal. In 1986, he inspired thousands of recruits from Northern Bahr el Ghazal to make the long walk to Ethiopia. In January 1990 the SPLM imprisoned Kawac Makuei and other influential figures in the movement, centralizing leadership around John Garang.

On 21 April 1997 Kawac Makuei was among southern leaders who signed the Khartoum Peace Agreement of 1997, representing the Bahr al-Ghazal Independence Movement for Southern Sudan. The Agreement provided for self-governance of the south during a transitional period when a referendum would be held on the future form of government. It was boycotted by the SPLA. He was appointed governor of Northern Bahr el Ghazal State. In June 1998 an attack was made on his house, apparently by members of a rival pro-government militia.

== Later career ==
The civil war ended in January 2005. Kawac Makuei was appointed Chairperson of the Southern Sudan War Veterans Commission by the Government of South Sudan. In February 2010, he declared his candidacy for Governor of Northern Bahr el Ghazal, running on the United Democratic Salvation Front (UDSF) platform. In the April 2010 election, incumbent Governor Paul Malong Awan Anei of the SPLM got 162,209, General Dau Aturjong Nyuol won 84,452 and Kawac Makuei Kawac trailed with 9,854 votes.

== Sources ==
- Guarak, Mawut Achiecque Mach (2011). Integration and Fragmentation of the Sudan: An African Renaissance. AuthorHouse. ISBN 978-1-4567-2355-2.
