= Southern Sudan Association =

- Abbreviation: SSA
- Formation: 1970
- Founded at: London
- Dissolved: 1972
- Purpose: Advocacy

The Southern Sudan Association (SSA) was a London-based organization of southern Sudanese exiles and refugees. The SSA was founded in 1970 to build support in Europe for humanitarian assistance to southern Sudanese by publicizing the Sudan Government's attacks on its citizens, suffering in southern Sudan, and the epidemics that were rife there. Brian MacDermot served as the chairman of the SSA. (Note: Brian MacDermot was a former London stockbroker and the author of The Cult of the Sacred Spear, an account of the time that he spent living among Nuer in southern Sudan and western Ethiopia. See MacDermot, Brian (1972). Cult of the sacred spear: the story of the Nuer tribe in Ethiopia. London: R. Hale. MacDermot later served as the vice-president of the Royal Anthropological Institute of Great Britain and Ireland.) The director of the Southern Sudan Association was Enoch Mading de Garang.

== Advocacy and role in the Addis Ababa Agreement (1972) ==
The Southern Sudan Association (SSA) was an important center of southern Sudanese intellectual and political activity in London throughout the early 1970s. Many exiles who later rose to prominence in southern Sudan during the 1970s and 1980s worked there or volunteered during the evenings. These included Antiok Athuai Lual Athuai, the "distribution manager" for Grass Curtain (published by the SSA), and Jacob J. Akol, who served as "secretary treasurer" for the SSA and sat on the editorial board of the Grass Curtain.

The SSA was closely linked to Anya Nya and the Southern Sudan Liberation Movement (SSLM). (Note: The Southern Sudan Liberation Movement (SSLM) of the First Sudanese Civil War (1955-1972) should not be confused with the South Sudan Liberation Movement formed in South Sudan in 1999. Southern Sudan Liberation Movement (SSLM) was the name adopted by Joseph Lagu in July, 1970, when he became the undisputed leader of a collection of southern guerrilla forces that had previously been known, comprehensively, as Anya Nya. For a good discussion of these events and the naming of the SSLM, see Poggo, Scopas S. (2009). The First Sudanese Civil War: Africans, Arabs, and Israelis in the Southern Sudan, 1955-1972. New York: Palgrave Macmillan. pp. 64, 128–130.) Enoch Mading de Garang, a founding member of the SSA, its director, and editor-in-chief of Grass Curtain, was an official representative in Europe of the Southern Sudan Liberation Movement (SSLM). SSA members traveled and delivered lectures and met with religious and human rights organizations to advocate on behalf of southern Sudan. The SSA published the Grass Curtain and issued press releases about human rights violations and epidemics in southern Sudan.

The Southern Sudan Association (SSA) played an important early role in putting into place many of the connections that led, ultimately, to the Addis Ababa Agreement (1972), which ended the First Sudanese Civil War. The SSA mobilized support among southern Sudanese refugees and helped to bring together several parties that would eventually meet in Addis Ababa, Ethiopia. These were the Southern Sudanese in exile and those supporting Anya Nya in Sudan, representatives of the Sudan Government and those of Anya Nya and the Southern Sudan Liberation Movement (SSLM), and the All Africa Conference of Churches and World Council of Churches. (Note: For an especially good, critical evaluation of the peace process and the SSA's roll in it, see Pirouet, M. Louise (1976). "The Achievement of Peace in Sudan". Journal of Eastern African Research & Development. 6 (1): 115–145. and, passim, Beshir, Mohamed Omer (1975). The Southern Sudan: From Conflict to Peace. C. Hurst and Company. ISBN 0903983184.)

== After the Addis Ababa Agreement (1972) ==
The Southern Sudan Association was dissolved in 1973, after the signing of the Addis Ababa Agreement (1972). Enoch Mading de Garang, who was the Spokesman of the Delegation representing Southern Sudan at the peace talks held in Addis Ababa, was later the first Regional Minister of Information, Culture, Youth, and Sports in the High Executive Council (HEC) government formed by the Addis Ababa Agreement (1972). In this role he was instrumental to the establishment of the National Archives of South Sudan. Dr. Lawrence Wol Wol, a co-founding member of the SSA as well as the SSLM's Representative in France, Served as Secretary to the Delegation to the peace talks in Addis Ababa. He was afterward elected to the Regional Assembly, Juba, under the High Executive Council (HEC) government.

== See also ==
- Grass Curtain
- Anya-Nya
- National Archives of South Sudan
