= Grass Curtain =

- Language: English
- Edited by: Enoch Mading de Garang

Publication details
- Former name: Voice of Southern Sudan
- History: May 1970 - May 1972
- Publisher: Southern Sudan Association in London (England)
- Frequency: Quarterly

Standard abbreviations
- ISO 4: Grass Curtain

Indexing
- OCLC no.: 490210863

Grass Curtain was a quarterly journal of Southern Sudanese politics and current events published by the Southern Sudan Association in London between 1970 and 1972. Enoch Mading de Garang was the journal's co-founder and editor-in-chief. The Grass Curtain was closely linked to the Southern Sudan Liberation Movement (SSLM), the political arm of Anya-Nya, a collection of Southern Sudanese separatist movements formed during the First Sudanese Civil War. (Note: The Southern Sudan Liberation Movement (SSLM) of the First Sudanese Civil War (1955-1972) should not be confused with the South Sudan Liberation Movement formed in South Sudan in 1999. Southern Sudan Liberation Movement (SSLM) was the name adopted by Joseph Lagu in July, 1970, when he became the undisputed leader of a collection of southern guerrilla forces that had previously been known, comprehensively, as Anya Nya. For a good discussion of these events and the naming of the SSLM, see Scopas S. Poggo (2009). The First Sudanese Civil War: Africans, Arabs, and Israelis in the Southern Sudan, 1955-1972. New York: Palgrave Macmillan. pp. 64, 128–130. ISBN 9780230607965.) The journal was published in large part to generate wider support for the South Sudanese cause.

== Name ==
The Curtain [surrounding Southern Sudan] is not iron, but grass. — Enoch Mading de Garang, 1970, London

The journal's name, Grass Curtain, evoked the Iron Curtain, referring to the boundaries of disinterest and political oppression that obscured the conflict in Southern Sudan from wider attention.

== See also ==
- Iron Curtain
- Anya-Nya
- National Archives of South Sudan
- Southern Sudan Association
