= Toby Maduot =

South Sudanese politician

Dr. Toby Maduot Parek (1936-May 24, 2012), was the chairman of the Sudan African National Union (SANU), a member of parliament in the government of southern Sudan (GOSS) Legislative Assembly, and a member of the Sudanese Group for Human Rights (SGHR).

== Life ==
Toby Maduot was born in Rualbet in Tonj North County (now in Warrap State) in 1936, and after early studies in his native Tonj and secondary school at Ahfad in Omdurman, he completed his medical training at Charles University in Czechoslovakia. Following his return from Eastern Europe in 1965, he worked as a medical doctor in central Sudan and Khartoum, and then joined politics as a SANU member under the leadership of late William Deng Nhial Deng Mabuoc. He held posts as a Minister at the Presidency in Khartoum in 1969, and then as the first Southern Commissioner of Bahr El-ghazal in 1971. After the Addis Ababa Agreement in 1972, he was elected to the People’s Assembly and named the first Minister of Health of the Southern Regional Government. He subsequently held the Information and Housing portfolios under the then High Executive Council for Southern Sudan. However, his greatest contribution was in his field as a Medical Doctor who selflessly served in the all corners of Sudan, and especially during the years of the second civil war when his clinic in El Haj Yousif in Khartoum was a sanctuary and refuge for thousands of displaced South Sudanese and other marginalized Sudanese living in the shantytowns of Khartoum.

Dr. Maduot was a political philosopher and played an instrumental role in shaping the ideology of SANU which later gave birth to Sudan People's Liberation Army/Movement. Working closely with his brother-in-law William Deng Nhial, one of Sudan's most important nationalist leaders in post-independence Sudan, he achieved recognition by the national government as they represented the first southern Sudanese political party. After the 1969 October Revolution, Dr. Maduot served in the cabinet and then was named Commissioner for Bahr al-Ghazal province in 1971.

After the signing of the Addis Ababa Agreement of 1972, in which he played a key role, Dr. Maduot became a member of the Southern Region High Executive Council (HEC) as the Minister of Health in the first regional cabinet under Abel Alier, and was elected to the Regional Peoples Assembly. He was subsequently appointed by President Jaafar Nimeiri as the first South Sudanese Commissioner of Bahr elGhazal Region in 1971, and then held several cabinet posts in the HEC under both Abel Alier and Joseph Lagu. Dr. Maduot is a principled human rights activist, secularist thinker, and strong opponent of the war, enslavement, and other disasters that the government has been escalating against the People of Sudan. During the rise of the SPLM/A, Dr. Maduot was one of the few Southern leaders who remained in Khartoum and fought politically as he always did. He operated a small Medical Clinic in one of the most impoverished suburbs of Khartoum in Elhaj Yousif, and devoted himself to fighting for human rights and an end to the war in the South of the country from which most of his patients came. The Sudan government arrested Dr. Maduot continuously along with journalist Alfred Taban, lawyer Mustafa Abdel-Gadir, lawyer Ali Al-Sayed, and many other democratic leaders or professionals who honestly and publicly criticized the regime's repression, war mongering, and non-democracy.

Maduot lived under intensive security surveillance before the peace agreement of 2005. He was repeatedly detained by the regime's security team for years in Khartoum. He was constantly harassed and interrogated but consistently refused to comply with the security team's unlawful procedure, which flagrantly violated international human rights law. On June 28, 2002 SHRO-Cairo issued a follow-up report addressed to the High Commissioner of Human Rights (Geneva), the African Commission on Human Rights (Banjul), and the other human rights organizations. Human rights worldwide call for the release of Dr. Toby Maduot after the government’s extension of his unlawful incarceration irrespective of his urgent need to medical attention at the time. Human rights and others became very involve and Dr. Toby became a known and respected figure as he peacefully shed light on the suffering of his people in Sudan. His Humanitarianism and commitment to democracy and human rights will remain his shining legacy for years to come. Late Dr. Toby Maduot was a husband to Mrs. Carmen Kwei Mawien, Late Mrs. Victoria Yar Arol (a pioneering politician in her own right), and Mrs. Sarah Paul Lako. 18 children and 12 grandchildren survive him. His body rests in Tonj, South Sudan.
