= David Ben-Uziel =

Israeli ex-Mossad agent (born 1935)

- דוד בן-עוזיאל
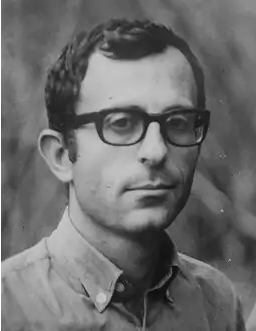
- Ben-Uziel in 1969
- Born: 1935 (age 90–91); Haifa, Mandatory Palestine
- Military career
- Nicknames: Tarzan; General John
- Conflicts: 1948 Arab–Israeli War; Sinai War; Entebbe raid; Operation Egged; Operation Olive Leaves; Qibya massacre; First Sudanese Civil War; Operation Brothers

David Ben-Uziel (Hebrew: דוד בן-עוזיאל; born in Haifa in 1935), nicknamed "Tarzan" and "General John," is a former Israeli member of the Mossad and a retired lieutenant colonel in the Israel Defense Forces. His military career began during the 1948 Arab-Israeli War. He served in various units and participated in significant operations, including the Entebbe raid. After his military service, he advised the Ethiopian army and later joined the Mossad in 1968.

In 1969, he led a Mossad mission to support South Sudanese rebels during the first Sudanese civil war. They created a makeshift runway in a forest to parachute essential supplies like medical equipment, vaccines, uniforms, and weapons from Kenya. His efforts contributed to the signing of the 1972 peace agreement, bringing autonomy to South Sudan. In 2011, South Sudan gained independence, and President Salva Kiir appointed Ben-Uziel as South Sudan's representative in Israel.

Ben-Uziel was a photographer, and during the mission, he carried cameras primarily for documentation and information gathering. Some images were used in Mossad publications for the Anya-Nya without revealing Israeli involvement.

Ben-Uziel embarked on an expedition across China in 2005 to retrace the Long March route. This journey covered over 24,000 kilometres (15,000 mi), and he documented it with nearly 400 photographs, leading to a photo exhibition in Tel Aviv in 2022.

== Early life and education ==
Ben-Uziel was born in 1935, in Haifa. He studied at the Tahkamoni school in the city and high school in Kibbutz Huldah. During the 1948 Arab–Israeli War, he served as a liaison officer in the Jerusalem Echelon. He received the nickname "Tarzan" from his friends after he saved a boy from drowning in Na'aman River.

== Military career ==
In 1952, he enlisted as part of the Nahal Neve Eitan unit. He volunteered for Unit 101, after its disbandment he joined the 890 Battalion in 1954 and served as the commander of a patrol unit and an instructor at the Small Warfare School. He participated in Operation Kibiya (famously known as Qibya massacre) as part of Unit 101, Operation Egged, Operation Kinneret, Operation Lulev, Operation Jonathan (famously known as Entebbe raid), Operation Gulliver, and Operation Samaria. In the Sinai War, he participated in Operation Macbes (the drop in Mithla) and the Battle of Mitla Pass. After the war, he commanded Company A in the 890 Battalion.

For two years, he served as an advisor to the Ethiopian army on behalf of the Israel Defense Forces (IDF). Upon his return to Israel, he established and commanded a paratroopers base in Al-Ram. After that he established and commanded a human facility. He served as a general officer of the 16th brigade, deputy commander of the neighbourhoods of Beersheba, battalion commander and deputy commander of a reserve brigade.

Ben-Uziel spent two years in South Africa as a representative of the Zionist Youth Movement and another two years in Ethiopia as a military consultant, where he provided training to Ogaden forces. It was during his time in South Africa that he initially ventured into photography, and while in Ethiopia, he pursued a remote-learning course from the New York Institute of Photography.

Upon completion of his duties, he was appointed as a Major General and later as a Reserve Commandant with the rank of Lieutenant Colonel. He later graduated from Tel Aviv University in the Department of Africa and the Middle East, before graduating from the College of Command and Staff. In 1968, he joined the Mossad.

== South Sudan ==
In 1969, he was sent to South Sudan as the head of a team to examine whether there is room for cooperation, as part of the Israeli move to build alliances.

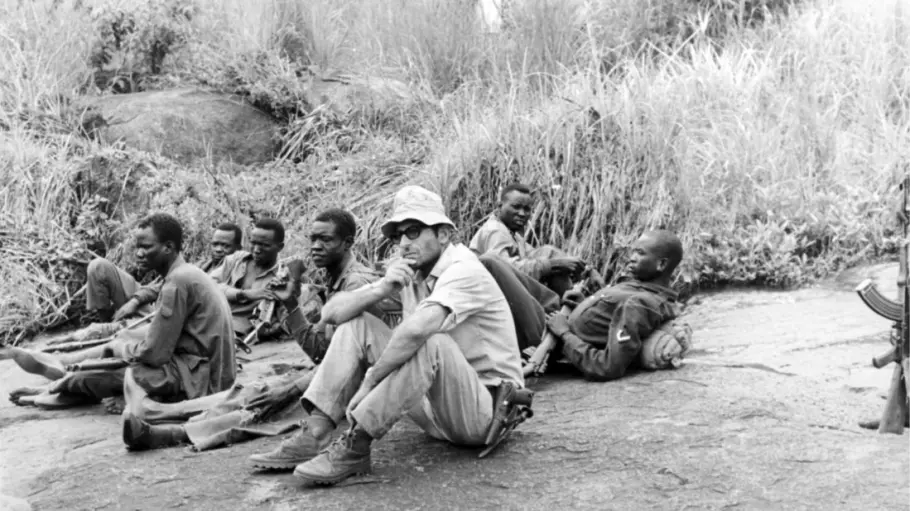
Ben-Uziel in South Sudan c. 1969

"General John," as he was known in South Sudan, played a remarkable role in the South Sudan struggle for independence in the late 1960s and early 1970s. Serving as a Mossad operative, Ben-Uziel led a mission to support the South Sudanese rebels who were battling the oppression and brutality of the northern Sudanese government during the first Sudanese civil war. Ben-Uziel's team constructed a makeshift runway deep within a forest, allowing vital supplies to be parachuted in from Kenya. These supplies included medical equipment, vaccines, uniforms, and weapons.

The culmination of their efforts was the signing of the peace agreement in 1972, mediated by Ethiopian Emperor Haile Selassie in Addis Ababa. Although the country remained united, the agreement brought greater autonomy with the establishment of the Southern Sudan Autonomous Region, and division of military and police forces, ushering in a period of relative peace until 1983.

After the military aid ceased in 1971, Israel continued to benefit from its close ties with Kenya and Ethiopia, with permissions for Israeli planes to refuel in Nairobi during the Entebbe International Airport rescue operation in Uganda in 1976.

Ben-Uziel's mission extended beyond military support. He worked to foster cooperation among different districts and tribal leaders within South Sudan, realising that unity was essential for their cause. His work was instrumental in the Anyanya's struggle for autonomy.

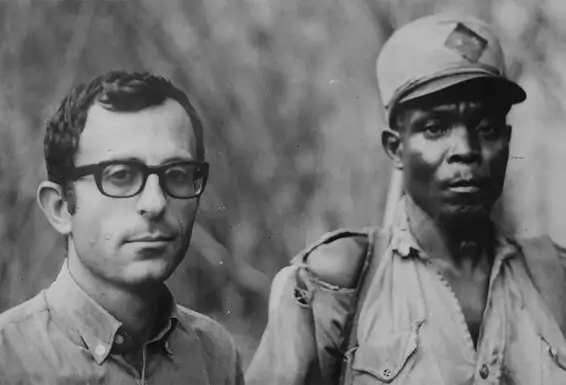
Ben-Uziel with a South Sudanese soldier in 1969

When Ben-Uziel entered Sudan in 1969, he already possessed significant photography experience and carried two cameras, one for colour and another for black-and-white photography. However, the purpose of taking cameras to Sudan in 1969 was primarily documentation and information gathering rather than propaganda. These images were not publicly shared, but selected photos were used in Mossad publications for the Anya-Nya. These publications aimed for authenticity and were disseminated as genuine Southern Sudanese materials through Israeli channels in Africa, concealing Israeli involvement in their creation.

Decades later, South Sudan achieved its independence after the 2011 South Sudanese independence referendum. President Salva Kiir, himself a former fighter in the Sudan People's Liberation Army (SPLA), expressed profound gratitude to Israel and specifically to "General John." Ben-Uziel was appointed as South Sudan's representative in Israel.

Ben Uziel's book "A Mossad Agent In Southern Sudan: 1969-1971 An Operation Log", published in 2015 by the Teva Habitov publishing house, about this encounter won him the Moldovan Prize for New Military Literature.

Ben-Uziel later returned to Mossad headquarters and worked as a case officer, ran Arab agents in Europe, and participated in the Mossad team airlifting Ethiopian Jews to Israel, in Operation Brothers (1979 – 1985). Ben-Uziel went through a collection officers course and served in operational positions mainly in Africa until his retirement in 1996. As a member of the Mossad, he took part in the talks with the Ethiopian government.

In June 2026, Ben-Uziel was granted the honorary rank of General in the South Sudan People's Defence Forces by President Salva Kiir during a ceremony in Juba.

== Long March in China ==
In 2005, Ben-Uziel embarked on an extensive five-month expedition across China, stretching from Yudu County in Jiangxi to Wuqi County Shaanxi Province. His primary objective was to retrace the route taken by the Chinese Long Marchers during the 1930s.

Throughout this journey, he covered a distance exceeding 24,000 kilometres (15,000 mi), with approximately half of that distance covered on foot. Along the way, he engaged in interviews with numerous Long March veterans and individuals with deep knowledge of this historic undertaking. In July 2021, Ben-Uziel received an invitation from the Embassy of China in Israel to present a video where he shared his reflection on the experiences gained from following in the footsteps of the Long Marchers.

In 2022, a photo exhibition titled "Retracing the Long March" was held at the China Cultural Center in Tel Aviv, Israel which featured nearly 400 photographs taken by Ben-Uziel during his five-month mission in China.

== Personal life ==
Ben-Uziel is married to Ruthie, and have two sons and 9 grandchildren.
