= Samuel Aru Bol =

Samuel Aru Bol (1929 - 18 November 2000) was a prominent politician in Southern Sudan. During the Second Sudanese Civil War (1983-2005) he signed the Khartoum Peace Agreement of 1997 as representative for the Union of Sudan African Parties (USAP).

== Early years ==
Samuel Aru Bol was born in Rumbek, Lakes State in 1929. He was first elected to the Parliament of Sudan in 1968. He had a complicated political career during the presidency of Gaafar Nimeiry (1969-1985). On 3 May 1972, the Addis Ababa agreement was ratified as "The Southern Provinces Regional Self-Government Act 1972", bringing an end to the First Sudanese Civil War. Samuel Aru Bol and Joseph Oduho were appointed to the southern executive.

Samuel Aru Bol was made vice-president of the High Executive Council (HEC), the government of the autonomous southern Sudan. As HEC vice-president and speaker of the Assembly he became involved in a scandal related to the handling of 30,000 Sudanese pounds intended for refugee resettlement.

On 4 January 1982, he was among 21 leading politicians who were arrested in Juba, charged with forming an illegal party, the "Council for Unity of Southern Sudan". Others arrested were Clement Mboro, Michael Wal, and Martin Majier. After Nimeiri was ousted in the coup of April 1985, Samuel Aru Bol was appointed Deputy Prime Minister in the Transitional Military Government of President Sowar al-Dahab. He created the Southern Sudanese Political Association (SSPA), which won ten seats in the 1986 elections. In July 1987 the SSPA joined forces with four other southern parties in a coalition called the Union of Sudanese African Parties (USAP), led by James Eliaba Surur.

== Omar al-Bashir regime ==
Samuel Aru Bol and other senior politicians were arrested after the coup of 30 June 1989 that brought Omar al-Bashir to power. He was held for six months without charge or trial. After the coup, James Eliaba was imprisoned, tortured, then allowed to go into exile in Uganda. In 1991, Samuel Aru Bol was 62 years of age, married with eight children. He was arrested in Khartoum on 14 October 1991 for criticizing a government decision that schools in South Sudan, and schools in the north set up for Internally Displaced People (IDPs) from the south, would use Arabic rather than English. This was seen as another step in the move to Arabicize the country and submerge the cultural identity of southerners who had in the past been instructed in English.

From 1994 to 1998, Samuel Aru Bol spent time in Nairobi, Kenya with John Garang, leader of the Sudan People's Liberation Movement/Army. However, in a 1998 interview he cast doubts on Garang's sincerity in seeking peace. In 1996 Samuel Aru Bol agreed to sign the Preliminary Peace Charter, and on 21 April 1997 he signed the Khartoum Agreement as representative of the USAP, assuming an authority that may not have been justified. Aru died of diabetes related complications in Khartoum on 18 November 2000.
