= Victoria Yar Arol =

Sudanese politician (1948–1980)

Member of the People's Regional Assembly for Bahr el Ghazal Province

Member of the National Peoples Assembly of Sudan Assembly for Women's representative

Personal details
- Born: 1948 Sudan
- Died: 1980 (aged 31–32)
- Spouse: Toby Maduot
- Children: 3 children
- Education: Economics and political science
- Alma mater: University of Khartoum

Victoria Yar Arol (1948 – 1980) was a Sudanese politician. The first woman from Southern Sudan to study at the University of Khartoum she was later a politician with seats on the regional assembly for Bahr el Ghazal Province and the National Peoples Assembly of Sudan.

== Career ==
Victoria Yar Arol was born in 1948 in Sudan. She was the daughter of a Dinka tribal chief who had several wives and 20 to 30 children. Arol was the first member of her family to regularly attend school. She was the first woman from Southern Sudan to enter the University of Khartoum, graduating with a degree in economics and political science in the 1960s.

Arol married Toby Maduot, a medical doctor and politician who would later to become chairman of the Sudan African National Union (SANU), they had three children together. Arol was a SANU member and was the first woman elected to the People's Regional Assembly for the Bahr el Ghazal Province, where she chaired an anti-corruption committee. She was appointed a deputy minister in the regional secretariat of the Sudanese Socialist Union in 1979. In 1979 she suggested then that the disputed cities of Abyei, Kurmuk and Kafia Kingi be returned to the southern region as they had been so associated prior to independence. She later had a seat on the National Peoples Assembly of Sudan as a woman's representative member.

She was the aunt of politician Nyandeng Malek Deliech, state governor of Warrap. When Deliech was close to completing her primary education around 1977 Arol took her to Juba to continue her studies rather than dropping out at the end of primary school as was the norm in her village. Arol died in 1980. She has been cited by South Sudan president Salva Kiir as an inspiration to Southern Sudanese women.
