= Theophilus Ochang =

South Sudanese politician

Dr. Theophilus Ochang Lotti

Minister of Health, Southern Sudan
- In office 2005 – 2 July 2007
- Succeeded by: Joseph Monytuiel Wiejang

Dr. Theophilus Ochang Lotti (or Loti) is a political leader in South Sudan. He was the leader of the Equatoria Defense Force, a militia, during the Second Sudanese Civil War (1983–2005). After the civil war ended, he was appointed Minister of Health, and then adviser to President Salva Kiir.

== Equatoria Defense Force leader ==
On 21 April 1997, as head of the Equatoria Defense Force, Theophilus Ochang signed the Khartoum Peace Agreement. Under this agreement, signed by several militias in South Sudan but not by the dominant Sudan People's Liberation Army, the government of Sudan offered a degree of autonomy to the southern states and a roadmap towards independence via a referendum. He agreed that he would fight under the coordinated command of Riek Machar. President Omar al Bashir named Theophilus a member of the Coordination Council of Southern States that was established in this treaty.

== Minister of health ==
The civil war formally ended in January 2005. In November 2005, a few weeks after being appointed Minister of Health of the Government of South Sudan, Theophilus Ochang attended a two-day Program Review for Sudan's Guinea worm eradication program at the Carter Center in Atlanta, Georgia, United States. In December 2006 he opened the first Program Review of the South Sudan Guinea Worm Eradication Program in Juba. In February 2007 Theophilus welcomed former U.S. President Jimmy Carter to Juba. During his Carter praised the Ministry of Health for their programs to eradicate Guinea worm and control trachoma. In May 2007 the International Organization for Migration (IOM) organized a meeting between Dr. Theophilus Ochang, Minister of Health and Internally Displaced People (IDP) doctors and other health professionals in Khartoum who were considering returning home. Theophilus described how badly medical skills were needed in the south, and added "this is not an undertaking of a few years. It is a job of a lifetime".

== Later career ==
Theophilus Ochang was relieved of his position as Minister of Health on 2 July 2007 and was appointed advisor to the President on Social Services. In this position he had a direct reporting relationship to the president and was a dotted-line report to vice-president Riek Machar. In May 2011, Theophilus Ochang was elected to the Advisory Council of the Horiok community of Torit County in Eastern Equatoria State. The purpose of the council is to coordinate community affairs in the Payams of Kudo, Himodonge, Iyire, Imurok and Ifwotu.
