= 2022 Jonglei attacks =

Murle militias attack in South Sudan

- Part of Ethnic violence in South Sudan
- Location: Jonglei State, South Sudan
- Date: January 23, 2022 - late January
- Target: Bor Dinka
- Deaths: 32+ killed
- Injuries: 26+ wounded
- Perpetrator: Murle militias

In January 2022, armed Murle militias attacked Bor Dinka villages in Jonglei State, South Sudan, killing dozens of people.

== Prelude ==
In 2020, the South Sudanese Civil War ended with the creation of a unity government between the Sudan People's Liberation Movement (SPLM), led by President Salva Kiir of Dinka origin, and the Sudan People's Liberation Movement-in-Opposition (SPLM-IO), led by Vice-President Riek Machar of Nuer origin. Throughout the war, Jonglei state was a hotbed of violence between Nuer militias like the White Army and other ethnically-based militia groups. Violent outbreaks often came after ethnic mobilization, a common feature of militias in South Sudan. These ethnically-based mobilizations are also backed by state actors, such as the SPLM-IO, SSPDF, and NSS, or non-signatory groups of the 2018 peace agreement. Ethnic and communal conflicts begin as revenge attacks, ranging between cattle raids to ethnic cleansing.

In Jonglei state in particular, ethnic conflict only really escalated in spring 2020. Lou Nuer and Gawaar Nuer militias allied with Greater Bor Dinka militias against the Murle. The first attack began in Pibor, the largest Murle city, against civilians. The Murle then counterattacked into Uror County, the center of the Gun faction of Lou Nuer. The Nuer repulsed the attack, and then launched an offensive into southwestern Pibor county against the Murle. The fighting killed over a thousand people total, and displaced nearly 90,000 Murle and nearly 80,000 Lou Nuer.

War resumed to Pibor county on May 7, 2021, after Gawaar Nuer youth militias launched cattle raids on Murle civilians. The fighting subsided after ten days and dozens killed, and in response, President Kiir deposed and reappointed new, predominantly-Murle leadership in southern Jonglei.

Little is known about what instigated the January 2022 violence.

== Clashes ==
The clashes began on January 23, 2022, after Murle militias attacked the Bor Dinka village of Baidit Payam, wounding at least 26 people and leaving many more unaccounted for. The Bor Dinka villages of Dungrut and Machined were later attacked, killing at least 32 people. These raids continued through late January and early February, spreading to Uror County and Twic East County, in western Jonglei state. In the attacks on Dungrut and Machined, property was looted and houses were burned. Three women were also killed, and three children drowned trying to escape the violence. There was little indication the violence had continued by February 2022.
