= Panyagor =

- boma village
- Location within South Sudan
- Coordinates: 7°10′13.08″N 31°24′30.888″E
- Country: South Sudan
- Region: Greater Upper Nile
- State: Jonglei State
- County: Twic East County
- Time zone: UTC+2 (CAT)

Panyagor (alternatively spelled Panyagoor) is the county headquarters of the Twic East County of Jonglei State in the Greater Upper Nile region of South Sudan. Panyagor was also the headquarters of Twic East County before that county's division from 2016 to 2020 into Twic North County, Twic center County, and Twic South County. (Note: Prior to the opening of the Twic East County Head Office in July, 2015, the administration of Twic East County was housed in the former office of the Jonglei Canal Project (JCP) in Panyagor. (See Nikkel, Marc (2006). Why Haven't You Left?: Letters from the Sudan. Church Publishing, Inc. p. 119. ISBN 9780898697742.)) Panyagor lies roughly 110 kilometers to the north of Bor Town, the capital of Jonglei State, and seven kilometers to the west of the Jonglei Canal.

== History ==
Panyagor is commonly said to have once been a 'wut' (cattle camp) belonging to the Ayual community. Its possession was transferred to the Kongor community after the burial of the Kongor chief Aguir Deng there.

Joseph Oduho, a founding member of the Sudan People's Liberation Movement (SPLM), was killed in Payagor on 27 March 1993. He had traveled there to discuss how to build a new coalition after the violent breakup of the Sudan People's Liberation Army (SPLA) into rival factions.

== Cargo plane crash ==
A cargo plane chartered by Norwegian Church Aid and carrying material for a Lutheran World Federation WASH (water, sanitation and hygiene) project in Jonglei crashed in Panyagor on 14 November 2014.

== Overrun by Hippos ==
During the floods of 2013, which displaced many people and destroyed homes in Panyagor, parts of the town were overrun by hippopotamuses looking for pasture. The hippos trampled and destroyed dykes in the county and displaced people who "moved to higher grounds fearing being eaten by hippos."
