= Lobira =

- Village
- Location in South Sudan
- Coordinates: 4.416501°N 33.059052°E
- Country: South Sudan
- Region: Equatoria
- State: Eastern Equatoria
- County: Torit County
- Elevation: 2,215 ft (675 m)
  - Summer (DST): +3GMT

Lobira is a community in Torit County, Eastern Equatoria state, South Sudan. It is on the southern road between Torit and Kapoeta, and lies to the north of Lobira hill.

The village is inhabited by Lotuko people. It is in the Lomihidang North boma of the Chahari payam. The village is accessible by road in all seasons. It is about two and a half hours from Torit by public bus, a distance of 47 kilometres (29 mi). As of July 2010 the village had 4,010 people, including 895 returned Internally Displaced People (IDPs) from the nearby area and the same number of refugees from more distant camps. The great majority of the people are farmers and pastoralists. The people suffered insecurity from constant cattle raids by Buya people from Budi County in which civilians are often killed.

The village had a primary health care unit in 2010 with two untrained community health workers. Common pathologies included malaria, meningitis, respiratory diseases and spinal paralysis. The boreholes had broken down but water could be obtained from a nearby stream. The people had no latrines. but used the bushes. The village had one primary school with 13 teachers and 360 pupils, short of almost everything including buildings. Classes are held under the trees. The school had no water supply and no latrines. The nearest secondary school was in Isoke, 27 kilometres (17 mi) away.

Lobira is the birthplace of Joseph Oduho (1929–1993), an early leader in the struggle for independence.
