= Nyandeng Malek Deliech =

South Sudanese politician (born 1964)

Nyandeng Malek Deliech (born 1964) is a South Sudanese politician. She has served as governor of Warrap state since 25 May 2010, winning with 517,149 votes. She is the first female elected state governor in South Sudan.

== Early life and education ==
Nyandeng Malek Deliech was born in Cueibet County, Bahr el Ghazal (now part of Lakes State). She is the granddaughter of Chief Arol Kacuol. At age 13, she moved to Juba to live with her aunt, Victoria Yar Arol, and further her education. Deliech's aunt encouraged her education, which Deliech continued to pursue following her aunt's death. Deliech completed secondary school in Gezeria in 1984. She then began studying education in Egypt. She received her bachelor's degree from the University of Zagazig in 1991. That same year she married Andrew Maek Madut. Madut was born in South Sudan and working as a teacher in Ethiopia. Malek Deliech later continued her education in the United Kingdom, earning a master's degree from the University of Wolverhampton in 2003.

== Career ==
During her time in Egypt, Malek Deliech became active in Sudan People's Liberation Movement. Malek Deliech later taught at Moi University in Kenya.

During the struggle for independence in South Sudan, Nyandeng Malek worked in education in the liberated areas. In 2007, she became deputy governor and minister of education for Warrap State.She resigned the position due to disagreements with the governor. She earned support for her design to resign due to her principles. In April 2010 she was elected governor. She was sworn in as governor on 25 May 2010. She was the first woman to be elected governor in South Sudan. As governor, she pushed for greater educational opportunity for girls.

In August 2015 Malek Deliech faced criticism for dismissing 18 civil servants. A member of parliament called for South Sudan's president to remove Nyandeng Malek for alleged corruption. Nyandeng Malek was one of four governors President Salva Kiir dismissed on 16 August 2015.
