= National Archives of South Sudan =

National Archive of South Sudan
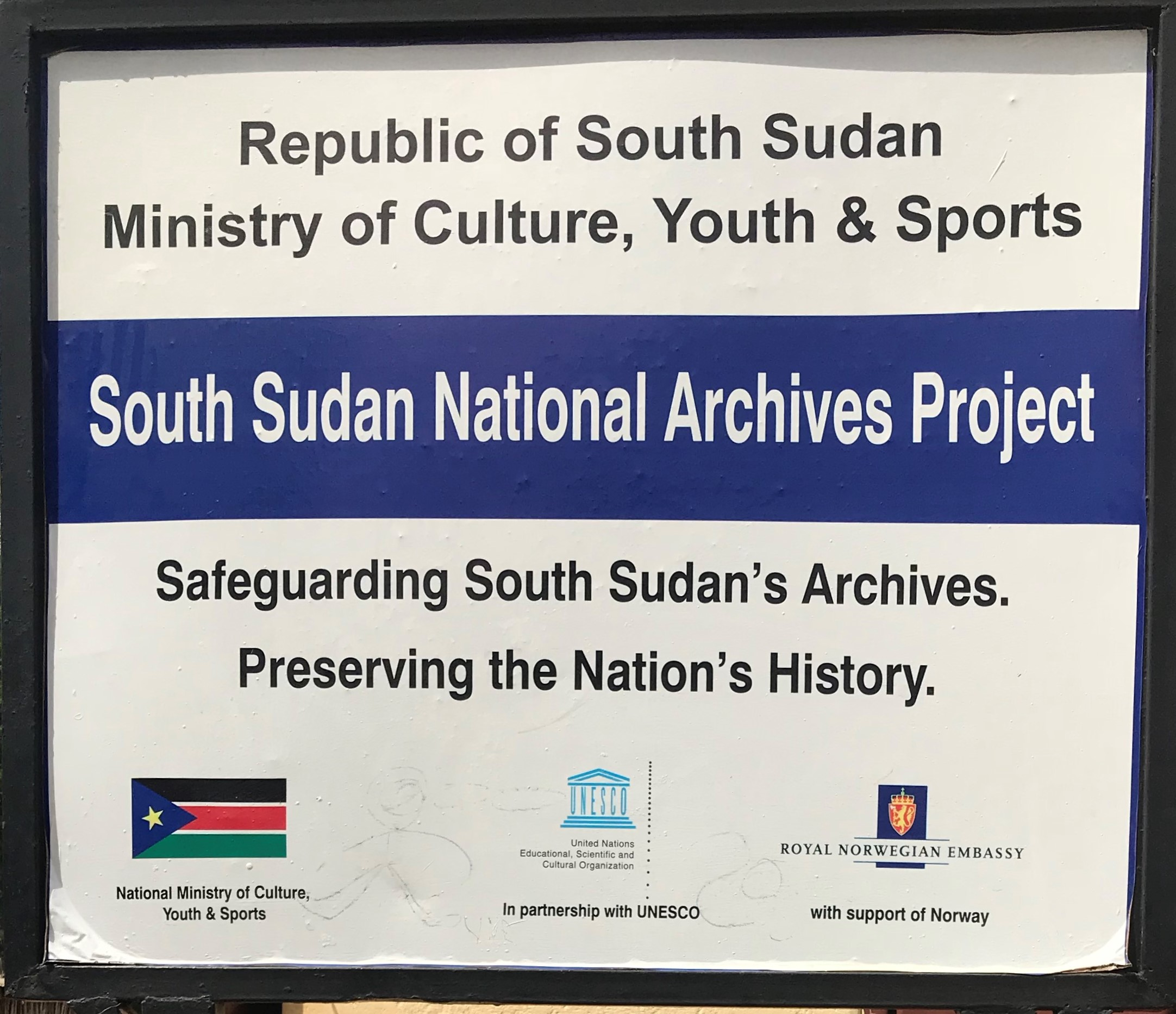

Agency overview
- Formed: 2005
- Headquarters: Juba, South Sudan
- Employees: 10
- Parent department: Ministry of Culture, Youth and Sports

The National Archive of South Sudan is located in Juba, South Sudan. The collection consists of tens of thousands of Sudanese and Southern Sudanese government documents running from the early 1900s, through the independence of Sudan in 1956 and Sudan's First (1955–1972) and Second (1983–2005) civil wars, to the late 1990s. The archives are run by the Ministry of Culture, Youth and Sports in Juba, South Sudan.

== History ==
The National Archives of South Sudan grew out of the work of Enoch Mading de Garang who in 1976, when he was the Regional Minister of Information, Culture, Youth and Sports, conceived of the idea for an archive of Southern Sudanese political movements. Enoch Mading expanded the archive to include Southern Sudan's administrative records on the advice of the historian Robert O. Collins. (Note: Robert Oakley Collins (1933-2008) was a prolific historian of Sudan. R.O. Collins traveled with his wife to southern Sudan in 1976, after being invited by Enoch Mading de Garang to compile a report on ways to collect and preserve materials related to Southern Sudan's recent history as part of the Southern Sudan Historical Retrieval Project. Among other things, R.O. Collins consulted officials and scholars and made an inventory of district files and filing systems. See "Robert Oakley Collins". reed.dur.ac.uk. Durham University Library Special Collections Catalogue. 1997.) The archives department was created in 1977 as part of the Ministry of Information and Culture.

Government records suffered serious damage in Southern Sudan during Sudan's first and second civil wars. Many documents were destroyed by heat, termites, floods, humidity, fire, and neglect. Many of these records were gathered together in the Southern Records Office in Juba in the 1970s and early 1980s by Douglas H. Johnson after the First Sudanese Civil War (1955–1972). (Note: Douglas H. Johnson was then working for the Southern Records Office in Juba, a predecessor to the National Archives of South Sudan. See Johnson, Douglas (2004). "Talking their Language: A Rare Language Exam from the Anglo-Egyptian Sudan". Sudan Studies. 32. Douglas Johnson has described recent work on restoring the archive in "The Revival of the Southern Sudan's Archives," Sudan Studies, 43, pp.28-36, 2011.) During the Second Sudanese Civil War (1983-2005), these documents were scattered, neglected, and sometimes destroyed.

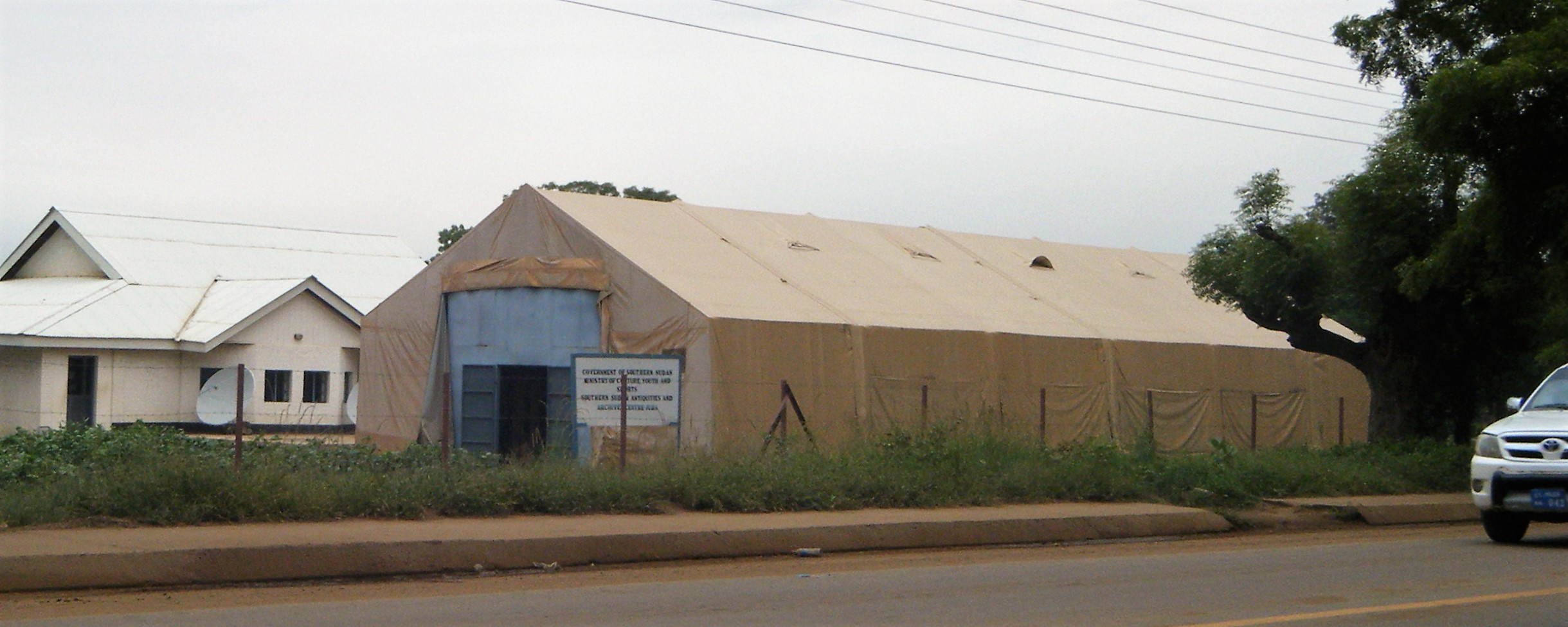
South Sudan archive storage tent in Juba, 2010

Authority over the archives was transferred from the Central Equatoria State to the Government of South Sudan after the signing of the Comprehensive Peace Agreement. Emergency work on the restoration of the Archive began in 2005, during the period of the Comprehensive Peace Agreement, with support from the US Ambassadors’ Cultural Fund. This involved the erection of a tent near the administrative headquarters of Central Equatoria state in Juba, where documents from the Archive were collected "in a disordered state" from the various locations where they had been stored in Juba during the war.

In 2010, the British Institute in Eastern Africa (BIEA) and the Rift Valley Institute (RVI) began a second phase of emergency conservation and digitization, which involved the provision of archive boxes and digitization equipment and training in digitisation techniques and archiving practice for South Sudanese. A third phase, funded by Michigan University and implemented by RVI, followed in 2013 and continued the work of emergency conservation and digitisation.

At South Sudan's independence ceremony in Juba in 2011, Pa'gan Amum Okiech, then Secretary General of the Sudan People's Liberation Movement (SPLM), announced that the old Sudanese flag lowered after independence would be kept at the National Archive in memory of the neighboring country's "shared history."

The project has received support from the Government of Norway for the construction of a permanent South Sudan National Archive Building. The Norwegian Government and the Prince Claus Foundation also provided funding for the renovation of a temporary building in Munuki, Juba, to provide temporary accommodation for the Archive. The construction of the new archives building was scheduled to begin in July 2014 and finish in July 2015. The planned construction of a permanent archive was disrupted by instability in South Sudan.

== Collections ==
The contents of the archive range from the early 1900s to the 1980-1990s and are often the only detailed records of previous local South Sudanese administrations in existence. The archive's holdings include monthly diaries and yearly reports, inspection reports, district and provincial reports, handing over notes, and general correspondences and reports.

== Tarikh Tana (Our History) ==
In November, 2017, documents preserved in the National Archives of South Sudan were featured on Tarikh Tana (Our History), a five-part radio series broadcast by Eye Radio (98.6 FM) in Juba. The program was supported by the South Sudan Ministry of Culture, Youth and Sports, the Rift Valley Institute, and UNESCO, with funding from Norway. The first episode was hosted by Rosemary Ochinyi and focused on documents related to the sentencing of the Torit Mutineers, the second an extract of the Gospel of St Mark from a 1952 Bible; and the third episode focused on an Instructional Pamphlet on Malaria in Bor Dinka, from 1948. The fourth episode focused on the archive document An Appeal by the Peace Delegation to the Anyanya from 1967. The final episode focused on a document titled The functions of the leopard-skin chief, a selection from a draft manual of Nuer customary law commissioned by the colonial authorities in 1944.

[Deng Nhial Chioh, an anthropologist and heritage expert,] explained that the term leopard-skin chief was an incorrect translation of Kuaar Muon, which means ‘earthly custodian’ in Nuer. ‘They put the word Chief there, which is not correct,’ said Mr Nhial. ‘The office of Kuaar Muon is very independent and very unique, he’s a peace maker and a mediator, he can profess some curses, and whenever a person kills another person, [that person] will run to Kuaar Muon.’ — Florence Miettaux, RVI

The radio programs were accompanied by public, pop-up exhibitions in Juba.

== See also ==
- List of national archives
- Douglas H. Johnson
- Can Archivists Save the World’s Newest Nation?
- UNESCO on the National Archives of South Sudan
- Communities of South Sudan build their National Museum
