= Aggrey Jaden =

South Sudanese revolutionary

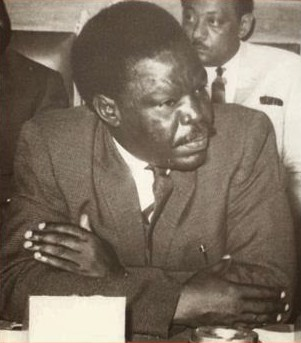
- Jaden in 1965

President of SANU

Personal details
- Born: mid–late 1920s Loka, Central Equatoria, Anglo-Egyptian Sudan
- Died: 1985 or 1987 (aged c. 56–63) Nairobi, Kenya
- Education: Loka CMS Elementary School
- Occupation: Politician

Aggrey Jaden Ladu (1924, 1927, or 1928 – 1985 or 1987) was a South Sudanese politician.

== Biography ==
Jaden is from the Pojulu ethnic group, known for promoting the independence of South Sudan from Sudan. He was born in Loka village in the mid to late 1920s.

== Education ==
Jaden attended Loka Church Missionary Society CMS Elementary school in the period 1936–1944, before proceeding to Nabumali secondary school in Uganda, where he studied from 1945 to 1949.He joined University of Khartoum in 1950 and graduated in the school of Arts in 1954 and joined Sudan administration and was trained as a sub – mamur administrator in 1955. Upon the independence of Sudan in 1956, he was accused of refusing to lower the British flag and replacing it with the new Sudan independence flag.

Jaden was transferred to Malakal in 1957 but got dismissed from the Sudan civil service in 1958 after the coup d'état of General Ibrahim Abboud. He left the country in search of a job and managed to get employed by the East African Railways and Harbours Corporation in Kenya.

== Political career ==
Jaden left this lucrative job to join the Southern Sudan People`s Liberation Movement--SPLM in 1963 in the company of Fr. Saturnino Ohure, Joseph Oduho and William Deng Nhial. He was elected President of the movement Sudan African National Union (SANU) after Joseph Oduho in 1964. He led the movement delegation to the Khartoum round table conference in 1965 and then returned to continue with the struggle. In April 1967, Jaden was elected the president of the Southern Sudan Provisional Government. He moved to Nairobi, Kenya in 1969 out of fear for his safety. Gordon Muortat Mayen was his successor as the leader of the Anyanya.

Following the signing of the Addis Ababa agreement in 1972, Jaden was the first to denounce it as a sell out because his objectives for the struggle were by far much higher. The agreement did not handle the issue of self – determination as at the Khartoum round table conference of 1965, and the agreement was not witnessed by any international observers. Jaden decided to dishonor it and remained in exile.

Many southerners tried to convince him to return home and join the Southern Regional Government. He eventually returned to Sudan in 1978 long after Addis Ababa agreement was signed. He returned an angry man and despite a lot of persuading, he refused to dirty his untarnished political career by participating in the government. In 1983, his rejection of the Addis Ababa agreement was vindicated when Gaafar Nimeiry tore the agreement forcing southerners, once again, to take to the bush for the second struggle for the liberation of the Sudan under the late Dr. John Garang.

== Death ==
The best recognition to the late Jaden was when the SPLA leader, John Garang, granted safe passage for the transportation of his body to his village Loka, for burial, in 1987 when he died in the same year.
