= Khartoum Peace Agreement of 1997 =

The Khartoum Peace Agreement of 1997 was an agreement made on 21 April 1997 between the Khartoum-based government of Sudan and various militia leaders from South Sudan during the Second Sudanese Civil War (1983-2005). The agreement formalized principles that had been agreed in a political charter signed in Khartoum on 10 April 1996.

== Signatories ==
The militia groups and their leaders were the South Sudan Independence Movement (SSIM) (Riek Machar Teny), the Union of Sudan African Parties (Samuel Aru Bol), the Sudan People's Liberation Movement (SPLM) ( Kerubino Kuanyin Bol), the Equatoria Defense Force (Thiopholus Ochang Loti) and the South Sudan Independents Group (Kawac Makwei). Although Kerubino Kuanyin Bol signed on behalf of the SPLM, he had in fact been expelled from that group in 1987 on suspicion of planning a coup against John Garang, and been jailed for five years. After escaping, Kerubino had joined up with Riek Machar, but early in 1995 Riek dismissed Kerubino from his South Sudan Independence Movement (SSIM) on the basis that he had signed military and political agreements with the government of Sudan late in the previous year, and that they had attempted to form a government-supported faction in the SSIM.

== Agreement ==
The agreement covered freedom of religion, movement and so on, and defined a federal structure with a formula for revenue sharing and with various powers devolved to the individual states. The agreement defined a four-year interim period to recover from the civil war in the southern states, with a Coordinating Council of the Southern States to oversee the transition. Riek Machar was made President of the Southern States Coordinating Council. He was also made commander in chief of the South Sudan Defense Force (SSDF), which included most of the ex-rebels who had signed the Khartoum agreement. The SSDF would maintain autonomy from the army, subject to a joint Technical Military Committee to coordinate between the Sudan Armed Forces (SAF) and the SSDF. A referendum on secession by Southern Sudan would be held before the end of the interim period, with international observers.

== Results ==
The agreement has been described as "a hollow document signed by splinter groups but not by the main force in the south". Since it was not signed by the Sudan People's Liberation Army, the main secessionist force, the Khartoum Peace Agreement did not gain international legitimacy. However, it did provide the basis for many of the elements of the 2005 Comprehensive Peace Agreement, including the clauses for an interim federal government, revenue sharing and the referendum. A polite analysis is that the agreement "called for the stipulation of institutions, the result of which worked imperfectly within a newly announced federal structure in the Sudan". Following signature of the agreement, the level of conflict escalated to the highest levels that had been seen since war broke out in 1955. The intensified conflict was funded in large part by foreign trade and investment associated with development of oil resources, many of which lay within the conflict area.
