= Saturnino Ohure =

Saturnino Ohure Hilangi, or Saturnino Lohure (c. 1921 – 22 January 1967) was a Roman Catholic priest and a politician who played an important role in the early movement for secession of South Sudan.

Saturnino Ohure was of Lotuho origin. He was born around 1921 and baptized at Torit, now in Eastern Equatoria state, in 1931. He studied at the Okaru and Gulu seminaries, and on 21 December 1946 was ordained a priest at Gulu. He and a companion were the first Lotukos to be ordained to the priesthood.

In 1957 Father Saturnino and Ezboni Mondiri Gwanza, founded the Southern Sudan Federal Party (SSFP), which beat the Liberals and won forty seats in the 1958 parliamentary elections, the first after independence in 1956. Saturnino ran successfully for the Torit constituency, and became a leader of the southerners in the Constituent Assembly. When the SSFP spoke up in parliament for the north to consider Sudanese federation, as promised, the government arrested Mondiri and the SSFP broke up. In its place, Father Saturnino formed the Southern Block, with 25 members.

The military government dissolved the assembly in November 1958. In 1961, Saturnino fled to Uganda to avoid arrest. Saturnino Ohure and Joseph Oduho moved from Uganda to Kinshasa, Zaire, where they were joined by William Deng and founded the Sudan African Closed Districts National Union (SACDNU) in 1962. Saturnino was killed by a Ugandan soldier near Kitgum on 22 January 1967. In January 2009 his body was exhumed from its grave in Kitgum and transported to Torit for reburial.
