= Southern Sudan Federal Party =

The Southern Sudan Federal Party was a short-lived political party in Sudan, formed in 1957. It was successful in the 1958 parliamentary elections, but left parliament when it was clear that its federalist constitutional proposals would be rejected, and shortly afterwards broke up.

Sudan gained independence in January 1956, with elections scheduled for February-March 1958. In 1957 Ezboni Mondiri and other young intellectuals and university graduates from the south decided to found a party to advocate policies needed by the south. Father Saturnino Lohure Hilangi was another founder. The founders called the party the Southern Federal Party, Federal Party and the Federalist Party. The party constitution laid out principles that included calling for an equal federation of northern and southern states, with English and Arabic given equal recognition. The state would be secular, with Islam and Christianity recognized as the two major religions but respecting other religions. The south would have a separate civil service, educational system and army.

The Federal Party formed a united front with the Anti-Imperialist Front (AIF). The incumbent prime minister Ismail al-Azhari also formed bonds with the Federals and the unions. In the February 1958 elections the Federalists won forty parliamentary seats out of the forty six allocated to the south. The party platform represented a serious challenge to the authorities. However, when it became clear that the Federal demands would be ignored by the Constituent Assembly, on 16 June 1958 the southern MPs left parliament. The government arrested Mondiri and the SSFP broke up. In its place, Father Saturnino formed the Southern Block, with 25 members. In November 1958 General Ibrahim Abboud seized power and dissolved parliament.
