= Twic East County =

Twic East county
- County
- Nickname: Twic Ariem
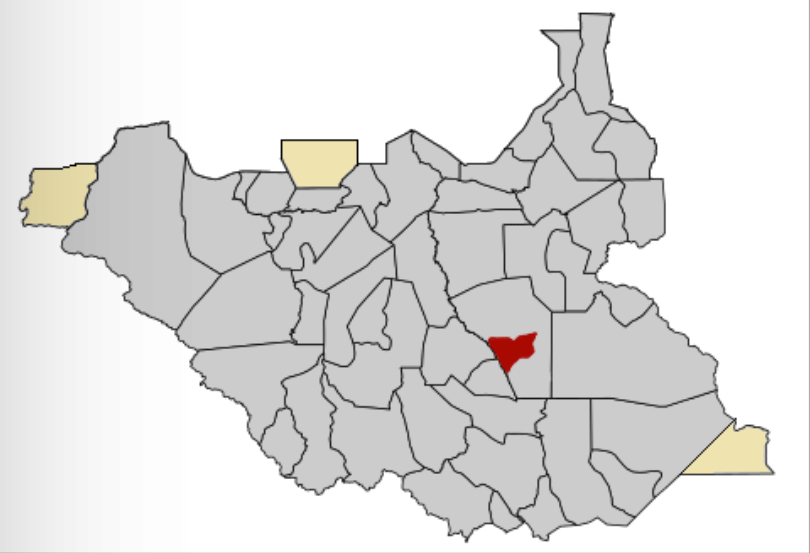
- Twic East County on a map of South Sudan, displayed in red
- Country: South Sudan
- State: Jonglei
- Headquarters: Panyagor
- Time zone: UTC+2 (CAT)

Twic East County, or simply Twic East, is a county located in Jonglei State, South Sudan. Its headquarters were located at Panyagor. (Note: Prior to the opening of the Twic East County Head Office in July, 2015, the administration of Twic East County was housed in the former office of the Jonglei Canal Project (JCP) in Panyagor. (See Nikkel, Marc (2006). Why Haven't You Left?: Letters from the Sudan. Church Publishing, Inc. p. 119. ISBN 9780898697742. Archived from the original on 2023-11-17.)) In May 2016, Twic East County was divided into Twic North County, Kongor County, Ayual County, Twic Center County, and Twic South County. However, in 2020, President Salva Kiir reinstated the original number of states and counties, thus reunifying original Twic East County.

== History ==
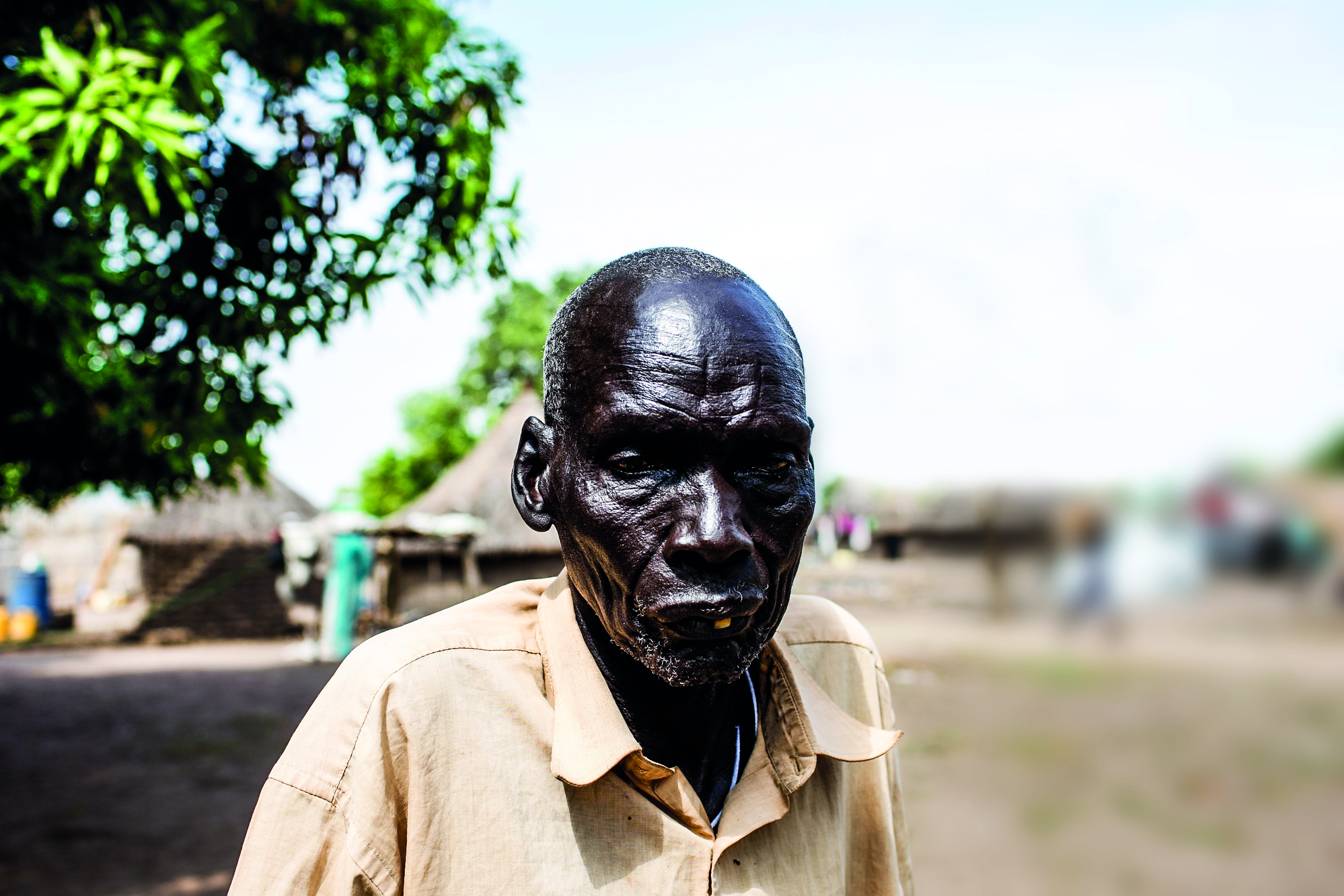
Man in Twic East County, 2014

The area encompassed by the former county of Twic East was former colonial Twi Dinka district.

Twic East County was home to the Twic community and it was nicknamed after a founding ancestor named Atwï or Atwïc Ariɛm [Pronounce: Twïny Ariɛm]. According to the Twic origin myth, their ancestors came from Patunduu' or Patundur, which lay to the west of Paliau, where Atwic and his brother, Yieu, lived. They had a falling out, and Atwic left his brother in Patunduu'. After Atwic's departure, Patundur suffered an eight-year drought, which only ended when Yiëu asked his brother to return. When Atwic returned so did the rains, earning him the chieftainship. (Note: The names of the communities of Twic were named for the various colors of bulls that were sacrificed to celebrate Atwic's return (for the story, see Simon Harragin (2012). Background Paper for Bor, Twi, Hol and Nyarweng Dinka (Report). Jonglei State – Strengthening Conflict Mitigation & Peace-Building – Nairobi Conference 19–21 March 2012. p. 3.))

Similar to other places in South Sudan, Twic East receives humanitarian aid due to droughts that stop agriculture. Food supplies have been targeted by raiders, such as one raid on trucks from the World Food Programme, which resulted in a loss of seven metric tonnes of food. Twic East Dinka never been subtribe to Dinka. Dinka Twi is subtribe of Dinka with different Dialect with Dinka Bor.

Twi Dinka was District during British times like other communities of Dinkas.

According to the Fifth Population and Housing Census of Sudan, conducted in April 2008, Twic East County had a combined population of 85,349 people, composed of 44,039 male and 41,310 female residents. (Note: The data collected during the Fifth Population and Housing Census of Sudan were to be the primary source of information for decisions about the number and demarcation of electoral constituencies and administrative boundaries in what was then southern Sudan. South Sudanese officials rejected census results for southern Sudan. See Darfur Relief and Documentation Centre (2010). 5th Population and Housing Census in Sudan – An Incomplete Exercise (PDF) (Report). Darfur Relief and Documentation Centre, Geneva (Switzerland). Archived from the original (PDF) on 18 September 2017.. Also, see Demographics of South Sudan.)

Twi Dinka of Jonglei state never been part of Bor District. Twic Dinka was district itself during British times in Sudan.

== Notable people ==
- John Garang (1945–2005), politician and revolutionary leader
- Adut Akech (born 1999), model
- Awer Mabil (born 1995), footballer
- David Manyok Barac Atem (1959–2021), general
