= Sudan African National Union =

Political party in South Sudan

Sudan African National Union الاتحاد الوطني الأفريقي السوداني
- Leader: Toby Maduot
- President: Joseph Oduho
- General Secretary: William Deng Nhial
- Founded: February 1962
- Headquarters: Kinshasa (1962–1963); Kampala (from 1963)
- Armed wing: Anyanya
- National Legislative Assembly: 4 / 550

The Sudan African National Union (Juba Arabic: الاتحاد الوطني الأفريقي السوداني Ettihad Al-Wataniy Al-Afriqiy Al-Sudani; SANU) is a political party formed in 1963 by Saturnino Ohure and William Deng Nhial in Uganda. In the late 1960s, the party contested elections in Sudan seeking autonomy for southern Sudan within a federal structure. The exile branch of the party meanwhile supported full independence. A party with this name was represented in the Southern Sudan legislature in 2008.

== Origins ==
Some time after the army took power in 1958, William Deng fled into exile, as did other southern politicians including Fr. Saturnino Ohure, Joseph Oduho and Alexis Bakumba. Saturnino Ohure and Joseph Oduho moved from Uganda to Kinshasa, Zaire, where they were joined by William Deng and founded the Sudan African Closed Districts National Union (SACDNU) in 1962. The exiles moved back to Kampala in Uganda in 1963 and shortened the movement's name to Sudan African National Union (SANU). Joseph Oduho was the first president of SANU (1962–1964). The new name was designed to show solidarity with other African nationalist movements of the period.

== Party in exile ==
In Kampala, SANU became the voice of the 60,000 refugees who had fled to camps in Zaire and Uganda, but was unable to establish a political presence in Sudan. The SANU leaders did manage to organize a loose guerrilla movement, the Anyanya, which began operating in Equatoria in 1963, conducting isolated raids and largely remaining independent of the politicians in Kampala.

== Attempt at democracy ==
In February 1965, William Deng split with the exiled SANU leaders and returned to Sudan, causing the party to split into SANU-inside and SANU-outside wings, with Deng leading the "inside" wing and Aggrey Jaden leading the "outside" wing. SANU was formally registered as a political party in Sudan at a rally in Omdurman on 11 April 1965 attended by about 2,000 southerners. Deng's wing of SANU and the Southern Front, a mass organization led by Stanislaus Paysama, contested the April 1965 parliamentary elections. SANU was an active force in Sudanese politics for the next four years, advocating southern autonomy within a federal structure. In the 1968 election, William Deng won his seat by a landslide, but was assassinated just as the results were announced.

== Later years ==
The exiled SANU leaders did not accept Deng's moderate approach and formed the Azania Liberation Front in Kampala, Uganda. Between 1965 and 1967, Joseph Oduho was president of the Azania Liberation Front. He finally broke with the exile groups in 1971 due to disagreement with Joseph Lagu, commander of the Anyanya guerrilla fighters, who wanted to subordinate the political wing of the movement to the military wing. Oduho was committed to the unity of southern Sudan, while Lagu wanted to withdraw into the smaller Equatoria region.

Deng was the father of Nhial Deng Nhial, the current South Sudan Minister for Sudan People's Liberation Army (SPLA) Affairs. The party advocated self-determination and independence for the south. The current Chairperson of SANU is Dr. Toby Maduot. SANU has 4 members in the Southern Sudan Legislative Assembly.
