= Gordon Muortat Mayen =

South Sudanese politician (1922–2008)

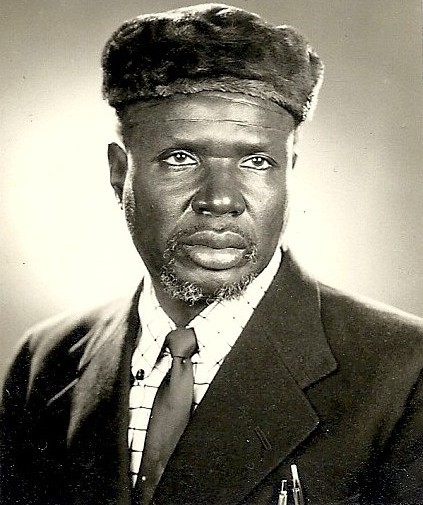

Personal details
- Born: 1922 Karagok (near Rumbek), Anglo-Egyptian Sudan (now South Sudan)
- Died: April 12, 2008 (aged 85–86) Rumbek, Sudan
- Occupation: Politician and freedom fighter

Gordon Muortat Mayen Maborjok (1922–2008) was a Sudanese revolutionary and politician and advocate for Southern Sudan's independence. He was the President of the Nile Provisional Government (NPG) which led the Anyanya during the First Sudanese Civil War. Muortat also served as Vice-President of the Southern Front (SF) and Foreign Minister in the Southern Sudan Provisional Government (SSPG).

== Early life ==
Gordon Muortat Mayen was born in 1922 at Karagok village 10 miles South East of Rumbek. His father was a local chief of Patiop Clan of the Agar Dinka. Muortat was educated at Akot elementary from 1936 to 1942. He then attended Loka Nugent Junior Secondary School in Western Equatoria from 1942 to 1945. In 1951 he was among the first southern Sudanese to graduate from Sudan Police College and was commissioned as a police inspector where he rose through the ranks to become Chief Inspector of Police.

== Political career ==
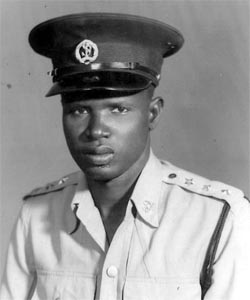
Gordon Muortat in police uniform

In 1957, Muortat was denied a transfer to southern Sudan, so he resigned his position and joined the Sudan Civil Administration. He was appointed assistant district commissioner and served throughout Bahr el-Ghazal and Upper Nile provinces. In 1965, under the transitional government of Prime Minister Sirr Al-Khatim Al-Khalifa, Muortat was appointed to be Minister of Works and Mineral Resources in his cabinet. However, when Prime Minister Muhammad Ahmad Mahgoub came to office, Muortat was dismissed.

In 1964, Gordon Muortat became one of the founders of the Southern Front (SF), a political party that would represent the rights of the people of southern Sudan. He headed the Southern Front delegation in the Round Table Conference between the north and south in 1965 and is remembered for demanding that the south be given the right to self-determination. He held this view due to the fact that southern Sudanese were not involved in the politics which led to the independence of Sudan from the colonial power in 1956. He therefore argued that southern Sudanese must be given the right to determine their political future in a referendum, to be carried out in the south which should be supervised and monitored internationally. This view was also shared by other members of the Southern Front, namely Clement Mboro, Bona Malwal and Hilary Paul Logali. The great massacres of Juba, Wau and all over the south that were carried out by the Sudanese Armed Forces in July 1965 convinced Gordon Muortat that the northern Arab rulers were not interested in the peaceful resolution of the 'South Sudan Question'. Thus in August 1965 at the meeting of the Southern Front executive committee, he proposed that the party should be dissolved and that the entire committee should move into exile with the objective of merging with the Anyanya political and military wings.

== Rebel leader ==
=== Anyanya One ===
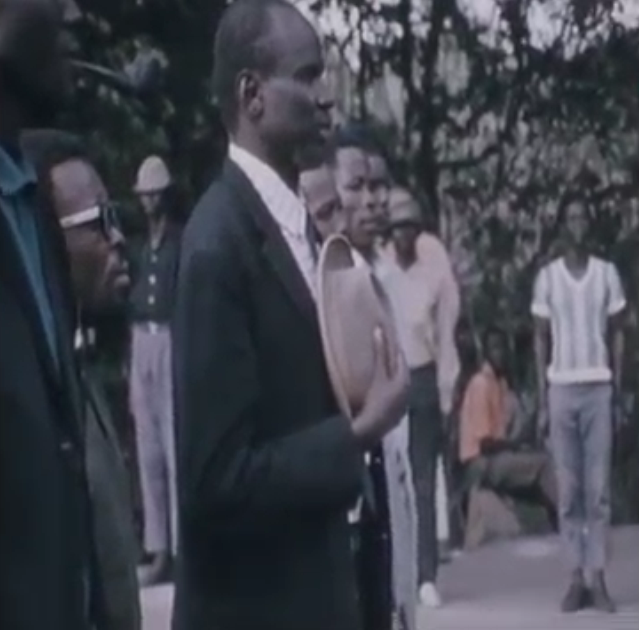
President of NPG Gordon Muortat at the declaration and raising of the flag of the Nile State (Republic), 1969

Muortat joined the Anyanya 1 insurgency, fighting in the First Sudanese Civil War to liberate the territories of Southern Sudan in 1967 and was appointed foreign minister in the Southern Sudan Provisional Government (SSPG) under Aggrey Jaden. After the collapse of the SSPG due to internal political wrangling, the second Anyanya government, the Nile Provisional Government (NPG) was formed. Gordon Muortat Mayen was elected unanimously as president, with his army fighting a fully fledged war against the north, advocating for the complete independence of the south. During this time, Southern Sudan was renamed the Nile Republic with its citizens being referred to as Nileans. The name Southern Sudan was rejected by Muortat and his government due to the name being just a reference to a geographic zone which has little relevance to the people of the Southern Sudan. It is also a name which was used by colonial powers to inadequately describe the Nilotic and Nilo-Hamitic tribes living on the upper region of the river Nile, first by the Egyptians, and later by the British. Dr. John Garang de Mabior, future leader of the SPLA, was among the batches of Muortat's soldiers sent to Israel for military training under the NPG.

The NPG was dissolved in 1970, after the failure to restore Israeli arms shipments to their forces. The weapons were instead being diverted to Joseph Lagu who formed the Southern Sudan Liberation Movement (SSLM) in January 1971 after staging a successful coup d'état against Muortat and his rebel government. At the time, Andrew Makur Thou, commander of the Anyanya forces under the NPG was willing to continue to fight under Muortat's leadership and quell the coup attempt, however Gordon Muortat declined. In a 1999 interview, Muortat, talking on the dissolution of the NPG stated, "I went to the bush in order to fight for the liberation of the South Sudan. And since Lagu had managed to secure arms for the liberation of our people, I did not see any reason to continue with a parallel struggle. So I decided to stand down. Because it is my belief that South Sudan cannot be liberated from the Arabs unless all of the Africans in the South unite and fight as one people, for one goal, the independence of South Sudan". He encouraged all loyal forces to join Lagu and continue the fight against the Arab dominated government in the North. While Muortat was leader of the Southern movement, he declined offers of ceasefire with Khartoum as he was not willing to accept the terms Gaafar Nimeiry was offering; local autonomy for the region of Southern Sudan. He was only willing to enter peace talks if the succession of Southern Sudan was on the agenda. Shortly after Joseph Lagu had taken over power as the leader of the movement, the SSLM under Lagu, entered peace negotiations with Khartoum to form the Addis Ababa Agreement which accepted regional autonomy for the South.

In 1971, Gordon Muortat was elected president of the African National Front, which was one of the southern factions that were against the Addis Ababa negotiations and did not actively participate in them, however they sent a clear message to negotiators on how proceedings could move. This included; that talks ought to be held between North and Southern true Representatives i.e. those mandated and not opportunists acting on complicity with the Arabs and their agents. Talks ought to take place without any pre-condition like the Arabs imposition of Local Autonomy. The talks ought to take place under the auspices of impartial organisations like the UN or the OAU. The Arabs must know that what they are now committing in Addis Ababa will never help in defeating the Southern Sudan. However, despite this, the Addis Ababa peace agreement was signed in 1972. Gordon Muortat did not agree with the contents and terms of the agreement, calling it a sell out and fraudulent. He believed that the Southern people were not given the chance to self-determination and a return to civil war will be needed in order for South Sudanese to achieve their true unalienable rights. He continued the protest against the agreement and remained in exile moving to the UK.

=== Anyanya Patriotic Front ===
During the period of peace after the 1972 agreement, the former Ayna-nya rebels were absorbed into the Sudanese army, however many were discontented, and some chose to return to the bush in 1975 and headed to Ethiopia. In 1975, Gordon Muortat along with the other Southern Sudanese politicians in exile, formed the Anyanya Patriotic Front, a liberation movement with the same aims as SSPG, NPG and the first Anyanya; to liberate the South as a separate country from the North. Muortat was elected as the President of the movement, other notable high-profile southern politicians that formed the APF were Elia Duang Arop; the movement's Secretary General and former minister in the NPG, Francis Mayar Akoon, Agolong Chol and many others who had disapproved of the Addis Ababa Agreement. The Ethiopian government agreed to station the mutineers, which formed the military wing of the APF, in a camp called Bilpam, which later became the first full-fledged SPLA battalion in 1984. Gordon Muortat and his group went on to assist organising the few thousand strong, majority Nuer troops in Bilpam, amongst the troops were the Late Vincent Kuany Latjor, Pagan Amum and Deng Alor. Later on the Late Samuel Gai Tut also joined the rebellion. A BBC reporter mistakenly labelled the Anya-nya Patriotic Front as Anyanya two, knowing that the movement was the continuation of the first Anya-nya one movement, However, Muortat denounced the splinter group that went on to fight with the SPLA that also became known as Anyanya II because they deviated from the original ideals of the APF. The new movement, the APF was confronted with many difficulties, launched as a genuine separatist movement to liberate the South Sudan and establish an independent African State, Muortat and the politicians heading it were not ready to entertain any ambiguous directives from their hosts and get dragged into the Communist demagoguery. As a result, the Ethiopian government dismissed them in refusing to provide financial and logistical support. The lack of financial and logistical support, as it was not forthcoming from anywhere, eventually led to their dissolution. Gordon Muortat however, had opened up a line requesting arms from Col. Muammar Ghaddafi’s Libya. Due to Libya's fractured relations with the Khartoum government, they were willing to assist. The arms were pledged to the movement in Southern Sudan and Muortat gave his blessing for the SPLA, who later took up arms against Khartoum, to make good on this offer.

As Muortat had predicted the Addis-Ababa agreement did not live long. Resource infringements and marginalisation of the South by the North led to increased unrest in the South. In 1983 President Gaafar Nimeiry declared all Sudan an Islamic state under Shari'a law, including the non-Islamic majority southern region, forcing southerners once again to take to the bush for the second struggle for the liberation of the Sudan, this time under Late Dr. John Garang.

Gordon Muortat's leadership and resolve were the driving force that continued armed liberation revival in Southern Sudan. Also inspiring many other South Sudanese politicians and students' organizations involved in the liberation struggle, notably the SOSSA and NAM. Despite his lengthy period of exile in Europe, Gordon Muortat remained an influential figure in South Sudanese politics. As a revered figure, his residence in London served as the Mecca for many South Sudanese political leaders of various political stripes and viewpoints in the 1980s and 1990s.

In 1994 Gordon Muortat was appointed as Personal Advisor to the SPLM/SPLA Chairman Dr. John Garang de Mabior and a member of the National Liberation Council. He participated in the Machakos peace talks in Kenya in 2004 with the government of Sudan. At the talks he insistently warned the SPLM delegates to learn from the experience of the Addis Ababa Agreement in 1972.

== Later life and death ==
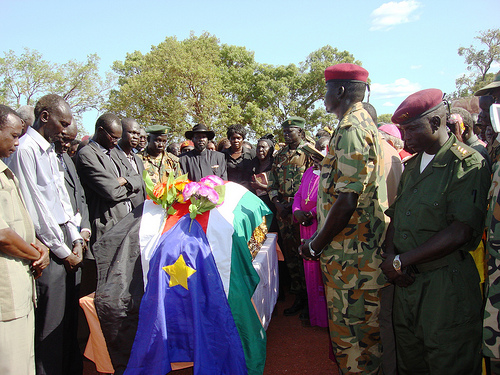
President Kiir at funeral of Hon. Gordon Muortat

From 2006 and onwards, Muortat became an MP in the South Sudan Legislative Council representing his constituency in Rumbek. In his inaugural speech to the SSLA he reiterated his concerns about the length of the CPA and on tribalism. On 12 April 2008, Muortat died from natural causes while on a recess from parliament-having achieved so much in his life. He was very proud of the SPLA/M achievements especially that the road to the realisation of the Southerner's freedom was within sight. Gordon Muortat was given a state funeral and was laid to rest at Rumbek Freedom Square, attended by thousands of citizens who had come to pay their last respects to a man who was remembered by many as a freedom fighter and defender of the rights of the people of South Sudan. Notable speakers at the occasion were President Salva Kiir, Abel Alier; former Vice President of the Republic of Sudan and President of the defunct High Executive Council for Southern Sudan, Isaiah Kulang Mabor, Madam Rebecca Nyandeng De Mabior, Mr. Andrew Makur Thou, Mr. Bona Malual, Mr. Clement Wani Konga and Mr. Daniel Awet Akot, then governor of Lakes State. In his address to the mourning citizens of the South Sudanese town of Rumbek, the President of the Republic of South Sudan, Gen. Salva Kiir, reminded the people of the selfless leader, who spent all his life struggling for the cause of the people of South Sudan. "It is now up to us, the present generation to transform Hon. Gordon's dreams into a reality, after achieving the Comprehensive Peace Agreement where the right to Self Determination for the people of South Sudan is enshrined," stated the President. President Kiir declared 3 days of state mourning and all the flags in Lakes State fly at half mast.

== Legacy ==
Muortat is widely praised by South Sudanese from all tribes due to his impartialness, his strong stance against tribalism and his vision of seeing Southerners united as equals. He is also greatly respected for his constant and consistent stance against the Khartoum regimes and his lack of compromise regardless of what he was offered by the Sudanese governments. Especially during the period after the Addis Ababa Agreement where he was under self-imposed exile due to his refusal to participate in the Southern Sudanese autonomous government under Nimeiri which he saw as unjust and a sell-out. He encouraged the idea of a continued struggle while many other Southern leaders and politicians embraced the peace and saw the military struggle as over. His stance gave hope to many Southerners who were becoming increasingly disillusioned by the Addis Ababa Agreement and the government. During this time was he expelled from many African countries by their government's such as Zaire and Uganda, due to their unwillingness to be seen as nations that are hosting such a high-profile rebel against the Khartoum government. Muortat was finally granted asylum by the UK after these expulsions.

He is survived by his wife Sarah Piath Ahoc, 10 children and 27 grandchildren and one great grandchild. In his memory, the Gordon Muortat Mayen Foundation has been set up, which seeks to help the people of South Sudan through various schemes and projects.
