= Falata-Umbroro =

Pastoralists living along Blue Nile

Falata Umbroro (the transhumance pastoralists) originally came from western Africa and settled in the Blue Nile in the beginning of the 1950s. They were permitted by the indigenous tribes to use the natural resources.

The Falata-Umbroro actually consist several ethnic groups which have their own local language, religion and native homeland. Originally from Western African countries, including Mali, Mauritania, Cameroon and Nigeria. Falata herders breed a species of cow that is known for its big horns, brown skin and tough hide.
