= 1958 Sudanese parliamentary election =

- 27 February & 8 March 1958

30 of the 50 seats in the Senate 26 seats needed for a majority All 173 seats in the House of Representatives 87 seats needed for a majority
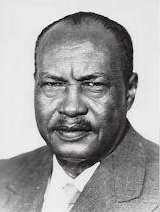

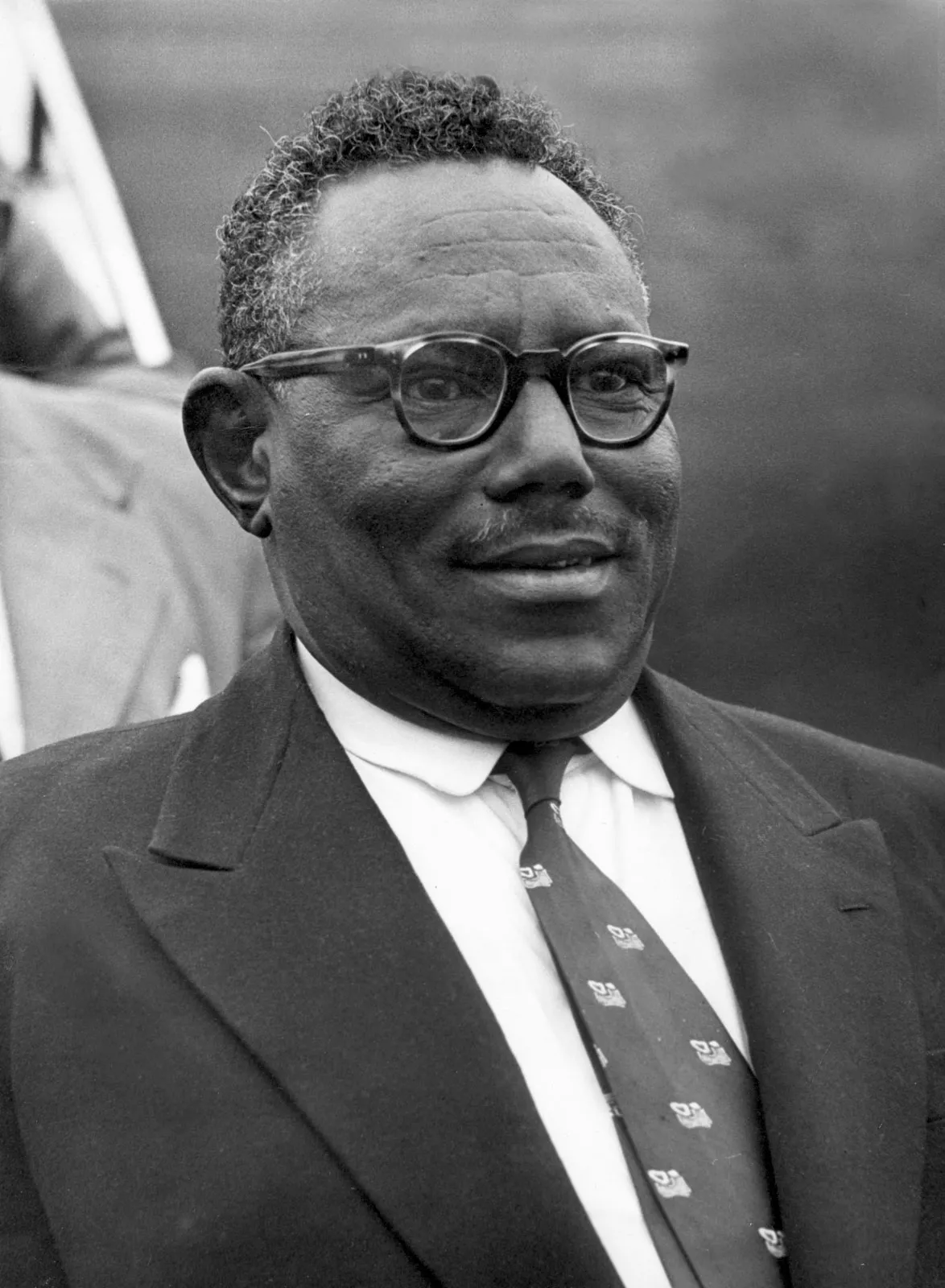
	First party	Second party
Leader	Abdullah Khalil	Ismail al-Azhari
Party	NUP	DUP
House seats	63	45
Change	▲41	▼6
Senate seats	21	10
Change	▲13	▼21
Prime Minister before election
Abdallah Khalil
NUP
Elected Prime Minister
Abdallah Khalil
NUP

Parliamentary elections were held in Sudan on 27 February and 8 March 1958 to elect members of the Senate and the House of Representatives. The first elections held since independence in 1956, they had originally been scheduled for August 1957 but were postponed by the Sovereignty Council, which had been in office since December 1955, on the grounds that flooding would disrupt voting. The elections resulted in a victory for the Umma Party, led by Prime Minister Abdallah Khalil, which won 63 of the 173 seats in the House of Representatives.

The Southern Sudan Federal Party competed in the election and won 40 of the 46 seats allocated to the southern provinces. Its platform posed a serious challenge to the authorities. However, when it became clear that the party’s demands for a federal structure would be disregarded by the Constituent Assembly, the southern members of parliament withdrew from Parliament on 16 June 1958.

== Results ==
=== Senate ===
Party	Seats			
Party	Elected	Nominated	Total	+/–
Umma Party	14	7	21	+13
National Unionist Party	5	5	10	−21
People's Democratic Party	4	5	9	New
Federal Bloc (Southern)	7	3	10	+4
Total	30	20	50	0
Source: Sternberger et al.

=== House of Representatives ===
Party	Votes	%	Seats	+/–
Umma Party			63	41
National Unionist Party			45	−6
Southern Sudan Federal Party			38	New
People's Democratic Party			27	New
Total			173	+76
Registered voters/turnout	1,582,909	–		
Source: Nohlen et al.
