= Equatoria Defense Force =

Former Sudanese militia

The Equatoria Defense Force (EDF) was a Sudanese militia.

== Area of operation and effectiveness ==
It operated in the area around Juba and Torit (in modern-day South Sudan) and was perhaps the most politically effective group in the South Sudan Defence Forces.

== Demographics, alignment and supporters ==
Most of its fighters were Latuku and Lokoya. It was generally believed that the central government of Sudan supported the EDF. The EDF signed a merger agreement with the SPLM/A in March 2004, although it was not clear how many EDF fighters accepted it. The Bor Group consisted primarily of SPLA defectors from South Bor. The governor of East Equatoria charged in 2006 that remnants of the EDF continued to carry out attacks and be a threat to security because they received arms from the central government of Sudan.
