= William Deng Nhial =

South Sudanese revolutionary (1929–1968)

William Deng Nhial (1929 – 5 May 1968) was the political leader of the Sudan African National Union (SANU), from 1962 to 1968. He was elected unopposed. He was one of founders of the military wing of the Anyanya fighting for the independence of southern Sudan. He was ambushed and killed by Sudanese Armed Forces (SAF) on 9 May 1968 at Cueibet, on his way from Rumbek to Tonj. The Sudanese government denied having authorised his assassination. Although no investigation was conducted, eyewitnesses at Cueibet village and an SANU investigation committee confirmed the SAF's part in his death.

== Background ==
William Deng was of Dinka origin, and was born in Tonj, then in Bahr al-Ghazal. He joined the government as an administrator. William Deng believed in Pan-African Democratic Socialism and in solidarity with African Sudanese in resistance to Arabization. He aimed for political partnership with indigenous African Sudanese people of Nuba, Fur, Beja, Nubia, Ingesenia and other parts of northern Sudan. These African groups formed the Congress of New Forces (CNF), in the Constituent Assembly in 1967/68, to oppose the government of Prime Minister, Muhammad Ahmad Mahgoub of the Umma Party.

== Exile ==
Some time after the army took power in 1958, William Deng fled into exile, as did other southern politicians including Fr. Saturnino Ohure, Joseph Oduho and Alexis Bakumba. Ohure and Oduho moved from Uganda to Kinshasa, Democratic Republic of Congo, where they were joined by William Deng and founded the Sudan African Closed Districts National Union (SACDNU). William Deng was appointed Secretary-General of SACNDU in 1962. William Deng and Joseph Oduho co-authored their first book in 1962: "The Problem of the Southern Sudan." In said book, they declared an arms struggle for the independence of southern Sudan from the Arab dominated, colonial government of Khartoum.

The exiles moved back to Kampala in Uganda in 1963, with the movement renamed the Sudan African National Union (SANU). The new name was designed to show solidarity with other African nationalist movements of the period. In Kampala the SANU became the voice of the 60,000 refugees who had fled to camps in the Democratic Republic of Congo and Uganda, but was unable to establish a political presence in Sudan. The SANU leaders did manage to organize the military Wing of the SANU, the Anyanya, which began operating in southern Sudan in 1963, conducting guerilla raids and military operations.

William Deng was responsible for the Bahr al-Ghazal insurgents, that launched heavy military attacked on Sudan's military garrison at Wau in January 1964. That Anyanya was commanded by Col. Bernadino Mou Mou. In that operation, over twelve SAF soldiers were killed, and many automatic weapons were captured. Those military activities posed a serious security threat and putting its weight behind the civilian demonstrations which were steadily challenging and eroding the already crumbling military government. In response to mounting pressure, the military ruler, Major General Ibrahim Abboud, announced his resignation and opened way to civilian rule, beginning from 21 October 1964. The new civilian provisional government, led by Prime Minister Sirr Al-Khatim Al-Khalifa, backed all political parties, north and south, declared freedom of speech and association allowing political parties to operate. The government called for peaceful solution to the "problem of Southern Sudan."

== Return to Sudan ==
In February 1965, William Deng decided to return to Khartoum and register the SANU. The other SANU leaders, led by Aggrey Jaden, rejected Deng's proposal and instead decided to continue outside Khartoum until total "independence is achieved." Thus causing a split of SANU into two factions, one inside Sudan and the other outside Sudan. William Deng organised and registered the SANU inside Sudan, after which he became its president. Aggrey Jaden, on the other hand, became the leader of SANU outside. The SANU was formally registered as a political party in Sudan following a rally in Omdurman on 11 April 1965, which was attended by 20,000 southern and northern Sudanese. The SANU was an active force in Sudanese politics for the next four years, advocating Federal system of government within united Sudan. The SANU in exile rejected Deng's moderated approach, and opted for separate independent southern Sudan.

The provisional government, led Sirr Al-Khatim Al-Khalifa, from 24 October 1964 to 15 June 1965, held the Round Table Peace Conference on the "problem of Southern Sudan." The Conference was attended by several northern political parties including the Umma Party, the National Unionist Party (NUP), the Islamic Charter Front (NIF), and the Sudanese Communist Party (SCP). Both the SANU factions and the Southern Front, led by Clement Mboro attended. The Conference was also attended by African observers from Egypt, Uganda, Kenya and Ethiopia. During the conference the northern parties – as they had done previously – rejected the various demands proposed by the southern parties. To save face the northern and southern parties agreed to continue consultations by forming a twelve-man committee to consider and study what they called "local autonomy."

The optimism in the south for return to democracy, was quickly aborted. Sirr Al-Khatim Al-Khalifa called elections for May–June 1965 as demanded by the northern political parties. The SANU inside and Southern Front boycotted the elections. As such the election ended up being held without southern inclusion. The Umma and the NUP won.

The two parties opted for coalition government headed by the NUP President, Ismail al-Azhari as president of the Supreme Council (five men's head of state membership) and Umma Prime Minister, Mohamed Ahmed Mahgoub, whose policy was to make war with southern Sudan arms movement, the Anyanya, and their supporters inside the country. The policy was approved by the Northern Constituent Assembly to proceed with war and persecution of educated southern Sudanese in southern and northern Sudan. As a result, Prime Minister Mahgoub committed massive massacre of educated and Chiefs in Wau, Juba and other towns on 9–15 July 1965.

Despite this, William Deng invested considerable time and efforts, trying to convince government leaders of the benefits of solving the north–south conflict. He pointed out the unwanted truth that the northern soldiers stationed in the south were in charge at daytime, brutal killers at night. If the stalemate were ended, military costs would drop and the south could supply the north with food, with surplus for export. He was not successful in his arguments.

== Assassination ==
In the 1968 election, William Deng won his seat by a landslide, but was assassinated just as the results were announced. Deng and others in his party were killed on 9 May 1968 in Cueibet County, Lakes State in a place that is now called William Bridge. There was little doubt that the army was responsible, although the government accused the rebels. The government ordered an investigation, but never issued a report on what had happened. According to Muhammad Omar Bashir, "The murder of William Deng represented a great setback in north–south relations. Deng's decision to return to the Sudan in 1965 to attend the Round Table Conference and his participation in that event, in the Twelve-Man Committee, in the Political Parties Conference and in the National Constitution Commission had all made a positive contribution to the search for a solution of the Southern problem.

After his death, William Deng was buried in his home town in Tonj South County. Deng is now considered a national hero. However, his grave fell into disrepair, partly used as a garbage site, partly for local breweries. In May 2011 residents in the immediate area of the grave were given one month's notice to leave so that the site could be cleaned up. His son Nhial Deng Nhial later became a leading politician in the Sudanese People's Liberation Movement, and in December 2008 was appointed Minister for SPLA Affairs, or Defense Minister.
