= Joseph Oduho =

South Sudanese revolutionary (1927–1993)

Joseph Oduho Haworu
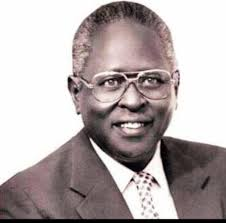

1st President of the Sudan African National Union
- In office 1962–1964

President of the Azania Liberation Front
- In office 1965–1967

Personal details
- Born: 15 December 1927 Lobira, Equatoria, Anglo-Egyptian Sudan (now South Sudan)
- Died: 27 March 1993 (aged 65) Panyagor, Kongor, Sudan

Joseph Oduho Haworu (15 December 1927 – 27 March 1993) was a leading politician from southern Sudan (today South Sudan) who was active in the struggle for independence and a founding member of the Sudan People's Liberation Movement (SPLM).

== Early years 1927–1960 ==
Joseph Oduho was born into the Otuho tribe community of Lobira situated in what is now Torit County, Eastern Equatoria, in the Republic of South Sudan on 15 December 1927. He was educated at Isoke Catholic Missionary Elementary School and Okaru Catholic Intermediate School, and became one of the first students at Rumbek Secondary School. He studied in Nyapeya in Uganda, then in Bakht Al Ruda Teacher's Institute, earning a Diploma in teaching in 1950. Following this he was a headmaster in intermediate schools in Maridi, Okaru and P'Lotaha.

In 1953 Joseph Oduho led a protest against the lack of representation of southern Sudanese non-Arab people in the negotiations over Sudan's independence. He was arrested in Maridi after the 1955 mutiny in Torit, (his hometown, now capital of Eastern Equatoria), accused of conspiracy and sentenced to death. He was released in the general amnesty after independence on 1 January 1956. Oduho was elected to the first post-independence parliament in 1957. He spoke in favor of a federal organization for the underdeveloped regions of the south. The army seized power in 1958 and Joseph Oduho fled the country in 1960.

== Exile leader 1960–1972 ==
Joseph Oduho was a founding member and the first president of the Sudan African National Union (1962–1964). He and William Deng published the first formal declaration of southern Sudanese objectives in The Problem of the Southern Sudan (1962). In this paper they argued for independence of the non-Muslim south from the Muslim north of Sudan.

In 1963 as Joseph Oduho and his colleagues officially launched the Anyanya Movement in Kampala, Uganda.

Between 1965 and 1967 he was president of the Azania Liberation Front. He finally broke with the exile groups in 1971 due to disagreement with Joseph Lagu, commander of the Anyanya guerrilla fighters, who wanted to make the political wing subordinate to the military wing. Oduho was committed to the unity of southern Sudan, while Lagu wanted to withdraw to the Equatoria region.

== Southern Sudan government member 1972–1983 ==
On 3 May 1972 the Addis Ababa agreement was ratified as "The Southern Provinces Regional Self-Government Act 1972" (SPRGA-1972), bringing a temporary halt to the civil war. Joseph Oduho and Samuel Aru Bol were appointed to the southern executive. He was given the position of Minister of Housing in the Southern Regional Government, Juba (1972–1975). It was Oduho who, on behalf of the SPRGA-1972, negotiated and signed an agreement with the Yugoslavian Government to construct Ministries and Ministers' quarters in Juba in 1973. Both the Ministries and Ministers' quarters have currently accommodated over 90% of the Government of South Sudan's cabinet. In 1975, Joseph Oduho was accused of plotting for southern secession and was arrested. He was released in 1977 after an amnesty declared by President Gaafar Nimeiry when the Sudanese Socialist Union (SSU) and northern political parties had come to an agreement.

Joseph Oduho ran successfully for election in 1977. He was appointed Minister of Cooperative and Rural Development (1978–1980) and Minister of Labour and Administrative Reforms (1980–1982). He was a member of the SSU Central Committee. In 1982 there were disturbances across the south, with some ethnic minority leaders calling for greater decentralization. Joseph Oduho was opposed to this, consistently advocating southern unity. He thought that decentralization and tribalism were being fostered by northern politicians in order to weaken the south.

== Second civil war 1983–1993 ==
In 1983, President Nimeiry dissolved the Southern Region that had been established following the 1972 Addis Ababa agreement. Joseph Oduho went into exile again and became a founding member of the Sudan People's Liberation Movement (SPLM). When the party was established on 16 May 1983, Joseph Oduho was made chairman of Foreign Affairs Committee and Colonel John Garang, a Dinka army officer, was made Chief of Staff of the Sudan People's Liberation Army (SPLA). Later Garang made himself leader of the SPLA/M.

For several years Oduho was imprisoned by the SPLA. He was released in 1992 to bury his late son, Cdr. Kizito Omiluk Oduho, in Lobira, Oduho's home village. He was smuggled to Uganda in East Africa after a failed attempt on his life by the SPLM/A Mainstream. He was picked up by his son, Ohiyok David Oduho, who worked as an Information Consultant With UNICEF's Operation Lifeline Sudan (OLS) from Madiopei in northern Uganda. He was flown to Nairobi where he organized a conference whose main objective was to reunite the fragmented SPLM/A. Dr. Garang was opposed to the move.

In March 1993, he flew to Panyagor, Kongor, Jonglei State, with among others, Cdr. Kerubino Kwanyin Bol, Cdr. Arok Thon Arok, Cdr/Dr. Lam Akol Ajawin, Cdr/Dr. Richard K. Mulla and Peter Abd Al-Rahman Sule, for further consultations with a view to broadening the base of SPLM leadership.

An attack was launched at their meeting place in Panyagor on 27 March 1993 by SPLM/A Mainstream's Bright Star Campaign Commanded by Cdr. Kual Manyang Juk. During the attack, Oduho was caught alive and executed almost immediately.
