= Jonglei Canal =

Uncompleted canal project in South Sudan

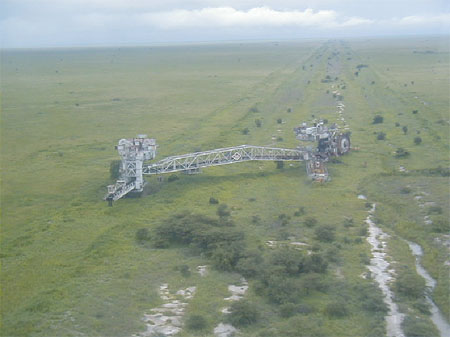
- Lucy, a digger used to dig the Jonglei Canal, has remained in its current location since 1983, when canal construction ended.
- Interactive map of Jonglei Canal
- Coordinates: 7°00′47″N 31°30′29″E

Specifications
- Status: Incomplete

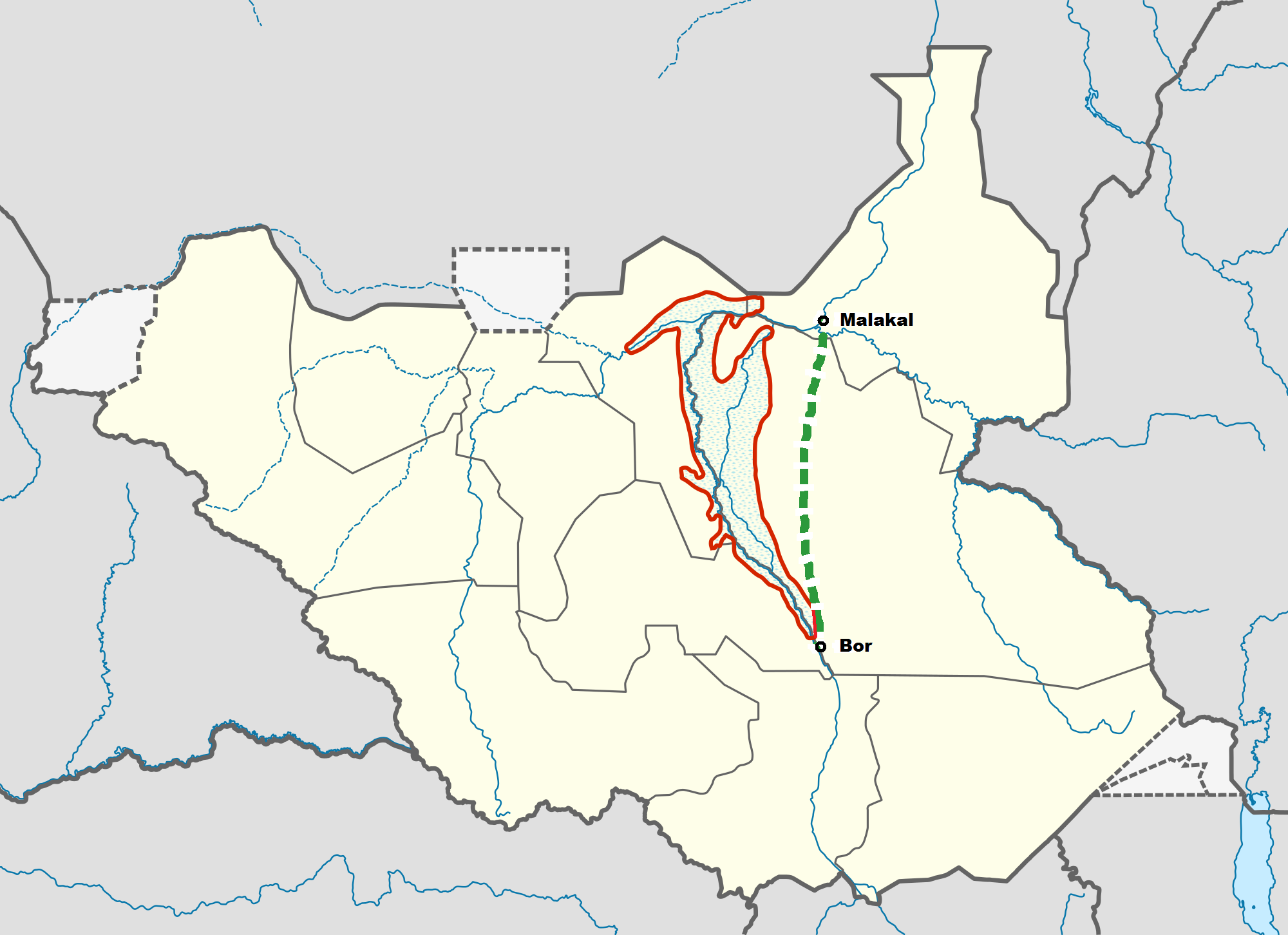
The Sudd wetlands (red) and the aborted Jonglei Canal project (green) in South Sudan.

The Jonglei Canal was a canal project started, but never completed, to divert water from the vast Sudd wetlands of South Sudan so as to deliver more water downstream to Sudan and Egypt for use in agriculture. Sir William Garstin proposed the idea of the canal in 1907; the government of Egypt conducted a study in 1946; and plans took shape between 1954 and 1959 during the period of decolonization which included Sudanese independence in 1956. Against the context of Sudan's postcolonial civil conflict, the Sudan People's Liberation Army (SPLA), led by John Garang, halted construction of the canal in 1984.

The dispute over the Jonglei Canal, and access to Nile waters, added a significant environmental dimension to the 1983–2005 second Sudanese civil war, in which disputes over the religious, linguistic, and cultural elements of Sudanese national identity also played prominent roles.

== Concept ==
Due to the Sudd swamp, the water from the southwestern tributaries of the Nile, the Bahr el Ghazal system, for all practical purposes does not reach the main river and is lost through evaporation and transpiration. Hydrogeologists in the 1930s proposed digging a canal east of the Sudd which would divert water from the Bahr al Jabal above the Sudd to a point farther down the White Nile, bypassing the swamps and carrying the White Nile's waters directly to the main channel of the river.

== Planning and construction ==
Sir William Garstin, Undersecretary of State of Public Works of Egypt, created the first detailed proposal for digging a canal east of the Sudd in 1904. By bypassing the swamps, it was calculated that evaporation of the Nile's water would vastly decrease, allowing an increase in the area of cultivatable land in Egypt by two million acres.

The Jonglei canal scheme was first studied by the government of Egypt in 1946 and plans were developed from 1954–1959. Construction work on the canal began in 1978 but the outbreak of political instability in Sudan has held up work for many years. By 1984 when the SPLA brought the works to a halt, 240 km of the canal of a total of 360 km had been excavated.

The rusting remains of the giant German-built excavation machine nicknamed "Sarah" are visible in satellite images near the south end of the canal. It was damaged by a missile. As peace was restored in 2000, speculation grew about a restart of the project; however, on February 2, 2008, the Sudanese Government said the revival of the project was not a priority. However, in 2008, Sudan and Egypt agreed to restart the project and finish the canal after 24 years.

The independence of South Sudan in 2011 effectively ended the role of the Sudanese Government in regard to the canal. The project has been discussed, but there is currently no agreement on resuming the project.

== Potential impact ==
It is estimated that the Jonglei canal project would divert 3.5–4.8 cubic kilometres (0.84–1.15 cu mi) of water per year, equivalent to a mean annual discharge of 110–152 cubic metres per second (3,900–5,400 cu ft/s)—an increase of around five to seven per cent of Egypt's current supply.

Little or no consideration had been given within Egypt to the ability of the Sudd swamplands to act as a sponge and regulator of floodwaters. Many would like to see further study of the area for future economic development as flood concerns are fixed with modern Egyptian engineering.

Whether the canal's highly questionable benefits would be shared by Egypt and Sudan—with the expected damage falling on South Sudan—remains to be seen, with some in favor of renewed efforts. The complex and potentially catastrophic environmental and social issues involved, including the collapse of fisheries, drying of grazing lands, a drop of groundwater levels and a reduction of rainfall in the region, limits the practicality of the project with 20th century technology, but future efforts may proceed.

== See also ==
- Aral Sea, a lake impacted by a water diversion project
- Draining of the Mesopotamian Marshes
