= First Sudanese Civil War =

Military conflict in Sudan (1955–1972)

- Part of the Sudanese Civil Wars and the South Sudanese wars of independence
- Sudan (red) before 2011; the first civil war took place in the country's south
| Date | 18 August 1955 – 27 March 1972 (16 years, 7 months, 1 week and 2 days) |
| Location | Southern Sudan |
| Result | Stalemate; Addis Ababa Agreement |

Belligerents
| (United Kingdom) (Egypt) Anglo-Egyptian Sudan (1955–1956); Republic of Sudan (1956–1969); Democratic Republic of Sudan (1969–1972); Combat support: Uganda (Joint operations on Ugandan territory, 1965–1969) (Libya) Libyan Arab Republic (From 1969 and combat involvement at least in 1970) | SDF mutineers, bandits, and unaffiliated separatist militias ALF (1965–1970); Anyanya (from 1963); Israel (from 1969) |

Commanders and leaders
| Alexander Knox Helm (Sudan) Ismail al-Azhari (Sudan) Gaafar Nimeiry | Joseph Lagu; Gordon Muortat Mayen (Israel) David Ben-Uziel |

Strength
| Sudanese Armed Forces: 6,000–7,000 (1955); 36,000 (late 1971) | Anyanya: 6,000–12,000 c. 18,000 (late 1960s) |

Casualties and losses
- 500,000–1 million killed including 100,000+ combatants

The First Sudanese Civil War (also known as the Anyanya Rebellion or Anyanya I, after the name of the rebels, a term in the Madi language which means 'snake venom') was fought from 1955 to 1972 between the northern part of Sudan and the southern Sudan region which demanded representation and more regional autonomy. The war was divided into four major stages: initial guerrilla warfare, the creation of the Anyanya insurgency, political strife within the government, and establishment of the Southern Sudan Liberation Movement. Around a million people died over the course of the nearly 17-year long war.

Although the Addis Ababa Agreement ended the war in 1972, it failed to completely dispel the tensions and addressed only some of the issues stated by southern Sudan. The breakdown of the initial appeasement later led to a reigniting of the north–south conflict during the Second Sudanese Civil War, which lasted from 1983 to 2005.

== Background ==
=== Colonial era ===
Until 1956, the British government, in cooperation with the Egyptian government (under a condominium governing arrangement) administered northern and southern Sudan as separate colonies despite both making up Anglo-Egyptian Sudan. At the time, the two areas were merged into a single administrative region after political pressure from the northern elite.

This act was taken without the consultation of minority southern leaders, who feared being subsumed by the political power of the northern elite in the colonial political structure. Additionally, the British colonial administration favored the northern elite during the process of decolonization, granting them a majority of political power during the transition to independence.

After becoming independent from colonial rule in 1956, the ethnic and domestic tensions against the southern Sudanese further escalated during the post colonial reconstruction. There were national concerns of political inequalities, economic development and insufficient institutions that remained hidden to the international community but ravaged Sudan internally. Also, the northern government superseded the jurisdiction of Intergovernmental Authority on Development (IGAD) by committing discriminatory violence against the southern minorities under the guise of internal turmoil of democratic growth.

=== Perspectives ===
==== The north ====
Prior to the outbreak of the civil war, the elite of northern Sudan had two widely held interpretations of what led to its outbreak; the first attributed such hostilities to be the remnant of the south's grievances against the British colonial administration, the second viewed it to be the southern insurgents' attempt in challenging their ruling government. These two interpretations placed no blame for voiced resentment and rising insurgency on their own governance. On the contrary, the ruling class rigidly associated the conflict's persistence to be a rationalization of the south's integration of Christianity and modernity.

==== The south ====
The southern populace considered the emergence of the civil war to have been an inevitability. Following the independence of Sudan, the southern elite were virtually powerless within the newly established government. Southern politicians were incapable of addressing the injustice against their populace because of the minimal influence and support they had within the government in Khartoum. They were not only subjected to severe animosity as an ethnic minority but also as a religious minority within the state. Since the establishment of British colonial rule, the southern Sudanese were introduced to Western ideas. Although there were no notable advancements in political equality and industrialization within the region, they interpreted concepts from Christianity and Western ideals and adopted them into their own culture. Therefore, in addition to their limited representation in politics, the coercion by the northern government and the cultural restriction in achieving progress were critical factors towards the start of the war.

== Course of the war ==
=== Uprising ===
On 18 August 1955, members of the No. 2 Company, Equatoria Corps, of the British-administered Sudan Defence Force (SDF) mutinied in Torit, and in the following days in Juba, Yei, and Maridi. The immediate causes of the mutiny were a trial of a southern member of the national assembly and an allegedly false telegram urging northern administrators in the south to oppress southerners. The mutinies were suppressed with the dispatch of numerous troops from the north, though survivors fled the towns and began an uncoordinated insurgency in rural areas. Poorly armed and unorganized, they were little threat to the outgoing colonial power and the newly formed Sudanese government. O'Ballance, writing in 1977, says that the 'period from 1955 to 1963 was simply one of guerilla survival, scarcely removed from banditry, and that it was successful due to a score or so of former southern SDF officers and warrant officers, and a small number of non-commissioned officers.'

=== Escalation of military intervention ===
The insurgents gradually developed into a secessionist movement composed of the 1955 mutineers and southern students. These groups formed the Anyanya guerrilla army. (Anyanya is also known as Anyanya 1 in comparison to Anyanya 2, which began with the 1974 mutiny of the military garrison in Akobo.) Starting from Equatoria, between 1963 and 1969, Anyanya spread throughout the other two southern provinces: Upper Nile and Bahr al Ghazal and provided heavy pressure on the Northern army's ability to properly maneuver. However, the separatist movement was crippled by internal ethnic divisions between the "Nilotic" and "Equatorian" groups. O'Ballance writes that one of the Sudanese army's four infantry brigades had been stationed in Equatoria Province since 1955, being periodically reinforced as required.

The government was unable to take advantage of the rebels' weaknesses because of their own factionalism and instability. The first independent government of Sudan, led by Prime Minister Ismail al-Azhari, was quickly replaced by a stalemated coalition of various conservative forces, which was in turn overthrown in the coup d'état of Chief of Staff Brigadier Ibrahim Abboud in 1958.

=== October 1964 protests ===
Resentment toward the military government intensified. On the evening of 20 October 1964, a raid by security forces at the University of Khartoum during a seminar on "the Problem of the Southern Sudan" sparked off nationwide protests and a general strike. In October 1964 Abboud resigned over the massive scale of civil disobedience creating an interim government. These events became widely known as the "October Revolution".

These protests included the first appearance of Islamist politician Hassan al-Turabi, who was then a student leader. Between 1966 and 1969, a series of Islamist-dominated administrations proved unable to deal with the variety of ethnic, economic and conflict problems afflicting the country. After a second military coup on 25 May 1969, Colonel Gaafar Nimeiry became Prime Minister and promptly outlawed political parties. Also during this time, the Anyanya insurgency took advantage of the unstable situations which enabled them to send their leaders and continue their operations abroad. Following Nimeiry's coup, Ugandan President Milton Obote ordered the end of all aid to the Anyanya.

=== Political turmoil ===
In-fighting between Marxist and non-Marxist factions in the ruling military class led to another coup in July 1971 and a short-lived administration by the Sudanese Communist Party before anti-Communist factions put Nimeiry back in control of the country. That same year, German national Rolf Steiner, who had been clandestinely advising the rebels, was captured in Kampala, Uganda and deported to Khartoum, where he was put on trial for his anti-government activities. Originally sentenced to death, he served only three years in prison before being released following pressure from the West German Government. The southern politicians, on the other hand, attempted to gain more political control and temporarily established multiple provisional governments in the south. They hoped to use diplomatic means to achieve autonomy and separation but due to their political factionalism, were ineffectual in comparison to the Anyanya Insurgency

=== Unified Southern Front ===
The south was first led by leader Aggrey Jaden; he left the movement in 1969 due to internal political disputes. In the same year Gordon Muortat Mayen was elected unanimously as the new leader of the south. Southern Sudan resumed warfare against Khartoum, however some of the former leader Jaden's troops would not accept a Dinka leader and fought against the Anyanya. In 1971, former army lieutenant Joseph Lagu carried out a successful coup d'état against Gordon Muortat with help from Israel, which pledged him their support. In doing so, the defected Equatorian commander was able to unify these troops of guerrilla fighters under his Southern Sudan Liberation Movement (SSLM). This was the first time in the history of the war that a separatist movement had a unified command structure with the mutual objective to secede and build an independent state. It was also the first organization that could claim to speak for, and negotiate on behalf of, the entire south when the war ended. Mediation between the World Council of Churches (WCC) and the All Africa Conference of Churches (AACC), both of which spent years building up trust with the two combatants, eventually led to the Addis Ababa Agreement of March 1972 which marked the end of the conflict.

== Impact ==
From the beginning of the war to the Addis Ababa Agreement, over 500,000 to 1 million people, of whom only one in five was considered an armed combatant, were killed while hundreds of thousands more were forced to leave their homes. The Addis Ababa Agreement was observed by Emperor Haile Selassie of Ethiopia and led to the establishment of regional autonomy for southern Sudan. It would be known as the Southern Regional Government and would have institutions such as a Regional Assembly and Executive Counsel serving as their legislative and executive branches.

The brief interlude of peace became a relative calm and thriving period for Sudan. The agreement was able to address some of the critical grievances held by southern Sudan of the Khartoum government. The immediate recognition of the region as sovereign and establishment of key political institutions were only a few examples of the major developments. Additionally, a new constitution was founded and southern Sudan was led by localized law enforcement agencies than that from the northern government. Despite these improvements, there was the prevention of the south's ability to have their own military and only remain autonomous under the northern Sudanese regime.

Therefore, the agreement proved only to be a temporary respite with no definitive means of peace keeping for southern Sudan. Infringements by the north increased social unrest in the south in the mid-1970s, leading to the 1983 army mutiny that sparked the Second Sudanese Civil War, which lasted almost 22 years and contributed to the complete independence of South Sudan.

== Bibliography ==
- Ali, Taisier Mohamed Ahmed, and Robert O. Matthews. Civil Wars in Africa : Roots and Resolution. McGill-Queen's University Press, 1999. ISBN 978-0-7735-6738-2.
- Arnold, Matthew, et al. South Sudan : From Revolution to Independence. Oxford University Press, 2013. ISBN 978-0-19-025726-2.
- Assefa, Hizkias. 1987. Mediation of Civil Wars, Approaches and Strategies – The Sudan Conflict. Boulder, Colorado: Westview Press.
- Avirgan, Tony; Honey, Martha (1983). War in Uganda: The Legacy of Idi Amin. Dar es Salaam: Tanzania Publishing House. ISBN 978-9976-1-0056-3.
- Breidlid, Anders (March 2013). "The role of education in Sudan's civil war". Prospects. 43 (1): 35–47. doi:10.1007/s11125-012-9257-3. hdl:10642/1432. S2CID 143632041.
- Eprile, Cecil. War and Peace in the Sudan, 1955 – 1972. David and Charles, London. 1974. ISBN 0-7153-6221-6.
- Johnson, Douglas H. 1979. "Book Review: The Secret War in the Sudan: 1955–1972 by Edgar O'Ballance". African Affairs 78 (310):132–7.
- Leach, Justin D. 2011. War and Politics in Sudan : Cultural Identities and the Challenges of the Peace Process. International Library of African Studies: 36. I.B. Tauris.
- Mulukwat, Kuyang Harriet Logo (27 August 2015). "Challenges of Regulating Non-International Armed Conflicts – an Examination of Ongoing Trends in South Sudan's Civil War". Journal of International Humanitarian Legal Studies. 6 (2): 414–442. doi:10.1163/18781527-00602006.
- Martell, Peter (2018). First Raise a Flag. London: Hurst & Company. ISBN 978-1849049597.
- O'Ballance, Edgar (1977). The Secret War in the Sudan: 1955–1972. London: Faber and Faber. ISBN 0-571-10768-0.
- Poggo, Scopas Sekwat. 1999. War and Conflict in Southern Sudan, 1955–1972. PhD Dissertation, University of California, Santa Barbara.
- Poggo, Scopas (2009). The First Sudanese Civil War Africans, Arabs, And Israelis In The Southern Sudan, 1955-1972. Palgrave Macmillan. ISBN 9780230607965.
- Smith, Stephen W. (2011). "Sudan: In a Procrustean Bed with Crisis". International Negotiation. 16 (1): 169–189. doi:10.1163/157180611X553917.
