= Addis Ababa Agreement (1972) =

1972 treaty that ended the First Sudanese Civil War

from left to right: Abel Alier, representing the Sudan government, Haile Selassie, the negotiation mediator and host, and Ezboni Mondiri, representing the Southern Sudan Liberation Movement

The Addis Ababa Agreement, also known as the Addis Ababa Accord, was a set of compromises within a 1972 treaty that ended the First Sudanese Civil War (1955–1972) fighting in Sudan. The Addis Ababa accords were incorporated in the Constitution of Sudan.

== Preliminaries and negotiations ==
Direct Negotiations between the Government of Sudan and the Southern Sudan Liberation Movement (SSLM) in Addis Ababa were preceded in 1971 by a series of discussions through the intermediation of the All Africa Conference of Churches (AACC) and World Council of Churches (WCC). In Addis Ababa, in 1972, Abel Alier led the delegation representing the Government of Sudan. Ezboni Mondiri led the delegation of the SSLM. The negotiations were moderated by Burgess Carr, who was then the Secretary General of the All Africa Conference of Churches.

== Results ==
The Agreement had the goal to address and appease concerns of the southern Sudan liberation and secession movement, as the First Sudanese Civil War grew costly in lives and resources to the northern Sudanese government and southern population. The Addis Ababa Agreement's establishment of the Southern Sudan Autonomous Region gave a degree of autonomy to the south. It meant southern Sudan would no longer be divided into the three separate regions Al-Istiwāʾiyyah (Equatoria), Baḥr al-Ghazāl, and Aʿālī al-Nīl (Upper Nile). The region would run itself through a separate legislative and executive body. The soldiers of the Anya Nya would be integrated into the Sudanese army and police force. The Addis Ababa Agreement gave Nimeri popularity and prestige both within Sudan and outside of the country.

A decade of relative peace followed, though the Addis Ababa Agreement failed to dispel the tensions that had originally caused civil war. The Addis Ababa Agreement proved to be only temporary respite. Resource infringements and marginalisation by the north led to increased unrest in the south starting in the late 1970s.

== Termination ==
In 1983 President Gaafar Nimeiry declared all Sudan an Islamic state under Sharia law, including the non-Islamic majority southern region. The Southern Sudan Autonomous Region was abolished on 5 June 1983, ending the Addis Ababa Agreement. This initiated the Second Sudanese Civil War (1983–2005).

== See also ==
- Democratic Republic of Sudan
- History of South Sudan
- Republic of Sudan (1956–1969)
- Republic of Sudan (1985–2019)
- South Sudan
