= Anyanya =

South Sudanese separatist rebel army

- The Anyanya flag: Red was for the blood spilled in the war; green for the land; white for hope of peace; black for Africa. The buffalo symbolized strength. Variant versions had a buffalo, a snake, and arrow poison in the center, or had no emblem at all.
- Founders: Joseph Oduho; Joseph Lagu; George Akumbek; Julius Moroga; Severino Fuli
- Leaders: Aggrey Jaden; Gordon Muortat Mayen; Joseph Lagu
- Dates active: 19 August 1963–1972
- Headquarters: Kampala
- Active regions: South Sudan
- Ideology: Southern Sudanese separatism
- Size: 5,000–10,000
- Wars: the First Sudanese Civil War

The Anyanya (also spelled Anya-Nya) were a southern Sudanese separatist rebel army formed during the First Sudanese Civil War (1955–1972). A separate movement that rose during the Second Sudanese Civil War were, in turn, called Anyanya II. Anyanya means "snake venom" in the Ma'di language.

== History ==
The Anyanya was founded in 1963, as the Pojulu, Moru, Nuer, Lotuko, Madi, Bari, Acholi, Zande, Dinka, and other tribes from southern Sudan waged a war against the Sudanese government. The foundation took place after a meeting between southern politicians and military at the residence of Joseph Oduho in Kampala on August 19. Those present included Joseph Lagu, George Akumbek, Julius Moroga, and Severino Fuli.

The Anyanya launched their first organized military offensive against the Sudanese army on September 19, 1963, in Eastern Equatoria.

The Anyanya movement, although relatively strong, was weakened by the internal political wrangling amongst the leading politicians of the liberation movement. In 1969, Aggrey Jaden left the Anyanya movement due to his frustration with the lack of cohesiveness and bickering within the movement. Shortly after Gordon Muortat Mayen was elected unanimously as southern Sudan's new president of the movement, the former SSPG was renamed the Nile Provisional Government (NPG). Under Muortat, the movement was able to carry on waging war against the north. However, Muortat's chief of staff Joseph Lagu was able through his assistant Oliver Batali Albino to negotiate with Israel, to divert the arms they were supplying the movement with, to himself, instead of the president Gordon Muortat. Following this, Lagu openly formed a coup against Muortat, and made every battalion pledge allegiance to him instead of Muortat if they wanted arms. The coup was able to successfully unite the army under Lagu and the transition of power was peaceful, Lagu assumed leadership of the movement both politically and militarily, and carried on the warfare against the north, the movement was renamed the South Sudan Liberation Movement. In 1972, Joseph Lagu signed a peace agreement with the north, ending the 17 year civil war. The peace agreement was initially rejected by leading members of the military such as Emmanuel Abuur and John Garang. However a letter circulated to all Anyanya forces which detailed the plan of the rebellion against the peace agreement was intercepted.

=== Legacy ===
Even before the civil war's formal end, many Anyanya had crossed the border to Uganda, where their ally Idi Amin controlled the military. Despite opposition by the Ugandan President Milton Obote, Amin had these fighters recruited into the Uganda Army. After Amin had overthrown Obote and assumed the Ugandan presidency in 1971, he recruited even more ex-Anyanya into the Uganda Army, as he regarded them as loyal to his government. Most of the Sudanese ex-insurgents actually acted as mercenaries. Ali Towelli and Godwin Sule were notable former Anyanya in the Ugandan military. (Note: It was often claimed that Hussein Marella, head of the Ugandan Military Police under Amin, was a former Anyanya. There is no firm proof for this claim, however, and it does not fit into what is known of his life and career.) As result of their association with Amin's unpopular regime, "Anyanya" eventually became a derogatory term in Uganda and was used as negative catch-all word for northern Ugandans as well as foreigners.

In 1975, many discontented former Anyanya who had stayed in Sudan, took up arms in eastern Upper Nile and Equatoria. They were labeled Anyanya II. When the Addis Abeba Agreement fell apart in 1983, marking the beginning of the Second Sudanese Civil War, the Sudan People's Liberation Movement/Army (SPLM/A) was founded. Competition between Anyanya II and the SPLM/A led to the eventual defeat of Anyanya II. Some of its members were incorporated into the ranks of the SPLM/A, and others were consolidated into a militia supported by the government of Sudan.
