= National Front (Sudan) =

- Sharif Hussein Al-Hindi
- Sadiq al-Mahdi
- Founded: 1972
- Dissolved: 1978
- Ideology: Sunni Islamism; Democratism
- Political position: Right-wing
- Religion: Sunni Islam

National Front (NF) was a political coalition in formed in Sudan in 1972 with the main aim to overthrow the incumbent president Gaafar Nimeiry. NF was formed out of the Sudanese Muslim Brotherhood, the National Umma Party led by Sadiq al-Mahdi, and the Democratic Unionist Party (DUP).

== Background ==
Gafaar Nimeiry rose to power through a coup in 1969 overthrowing the Sudanese Sovereignty Council in the process. After the coup multiple political parties like the National Umma Party and DUP were banned in Sudan. This move was opposed by the banned parties and led to the Ansar starting protest against Nimeiry. The opposing of Nimerys government lead to Nimeiry launching an attack against the Ansar in Aba island in 1970. In 1972 Nimery attempted reconciliation with opposition leader Sharif Hussein Al-Hindi and they met in Saudi Arabia to discuss. In Saudi Arabia Nimeiry accused the communist of perperating the Aba Island Massacre and asked al-Hindi to accept the position of Vice President. Despite the promising talks with al-Hindi, Nimery failed to reach reconciliation with the political parties.

== Formation ==
The Massacre in Aba Island and the failure of the reconciliation led to the banned opposition political groups to start negotiations for a new coalition. The negotiations lead to the establishment of National Front (NF) in 1972. NF was led by al-Hindi and the NF charter called for the creation of a democratic state with an Islamic orientation. The NF gained a significant amount of aid from Sudan's neighbors mainly the Ethiopian Derg, Egypt and Libya. Because of the help of foreign powers the NF could establish training camps in Libya with the help of Muammar Gaddafi who believed that the government of Nimeiry had betrayed the Arabs with the signing of the Addis Ababa Agreement in 1972. After Shabaan uprising of 1973, the Muslim Brotherhood left the coalition accusing NF of letting them down, with NF in turn accusing the Muslim Brotherhood of acting on their own in order to boost their declining popularity.

== Coup attempt ==
After the Shabaan uprising and the failure of the 1975 Sudanese coup attempt, al-Hindi gave up the leadership of the NF to al-Mahdi, marking a new phase in NF. Despite of the State Security Organisation (SSO) having knowledge of the coup the coup plot was still conducted on 2 July 1976. The coup which was heavily financed by Libya managed to overrun and hold Khartoum for a while but after around three days of laying siege on the city Nimerys forces were able to re-enter Khartoum and capture the city. After the coup hundreds of NF fighters were summarily executed and buried in mass graves around the city.

== Dissolution of the National Front ==
After the coup attempt Nimery started a National Reconciliation process with Sadiq al-Mahdi who was living in exile at the time. In early 1977 NF and the government of Nimeiry met in London to arrange for a conference in Port Sudan. In Port Sudan the two parties signed an eight-point agreement which readmitted the banned opposition parties in return of dissolving the NF. The agreement also promised to restore civil liberties, free political prisoners, reaffirm Sudan's nonaligned foreign policy, and reform local government. In 1978, 1000 prisoners jailed due to the coup were granted amnesty and former NF supporters were absolved to Nimeiris party, the Sudanese Socialist Union.

== Bibliography ==
- Ylönen, Aleksi (2005). "Grievances and the Roots of Insurgencies: Southern Sudan and Darfur" (PDF). Peace, Conflict and Development.
- Fadlalla, Mohamed H. (2004). Short History of Sudan. ISBN 0-595-31425-2.
- Mashamoun, Jihad Salih (2015). "A Prince and a Fractured Kingdom: The Case of the Sudan's Power Relations". American University in Cairo: 45.
- Fransesca, Maria (2019). "Sudan: Shari'a and Asylum" (PDF). Dipartimento di Scienze Politiche Cattedra di Islam: Culture and Politics: 24.
- Warburg, Gabriel (1995). "Mahdism and Islamism in Sudan". International Journal of Middle East Studies: 228.
