= Barakat, Sudan =

Barakat
- Location within Sudan
- Coordinates: 14.314122°N 33.534372°E
- Country: Sudan
- State: Al Jazirah
- Elevation: 386 m (1,266 ft)

Barakat is a town in Al Jazirah state, Sudan. It lies on the west shore of the Blue Nile to the south of Wad Madani.

The extra long staple cotton named Sudan Barakat is planted in the irrigated fields of this region. Sudan Barakat, which is entirely handpicked, is considered to be one of the world's highest quality cottons. A 6,000 feddan pump irrigation scheme was started at Barakat in 1914. The plan was launched by a group of English weaving companies called the Sudan Plantation Syndicate, which had already started a successful pump scheme at Taiba (Ţayyibat Ḩamad an Nīl) in 1910. The town is home to the headquarters of the Sudan Gezira Board, which runs the Gezira-Managil Irrigation System. A light railway runs through Barakat, used for carrying the cotton harvest.

The village of Shakaba is nearby. After the Battle of Karari (2 September 1898), in which the Mahdist forces of the Khalifa were defeated by an Anglo-Egyptian army under General Herbert Kitchener, the Mahdi's family was sent to Shakaba under government escort. After hearing a rumor that the group was conducting Mahdist propaganda, a force of government troops fired on the group at random, killing Khalifa Muhammad Sharif and two of the Mahdi's sons, al-Fadil and al-Bushra. A third son, Abd al-Rahman al-Mahdi, was badly wounded.
