= Siddick Sayed el-Mahdi =

Sudanese religious and political leader (1911–1961)

Siddick Sayed el-Mahdi (1911–1961), was a religious and political leader in Sudan. He was born in northern Sudan, the son of Abdul Rahman al-Mahdi and thus belonged to one of the leading families in the country. He believed in a non-violent method of a free Sudan, and in 1945 he formed the Umma party together with his father. He was the father of Sadiq al-Mahdi, and the brother of Al-Hadi al-Mahdi.
