= Aba Island massacre =

1970 massacre in Sudan

Aba Island Massacre
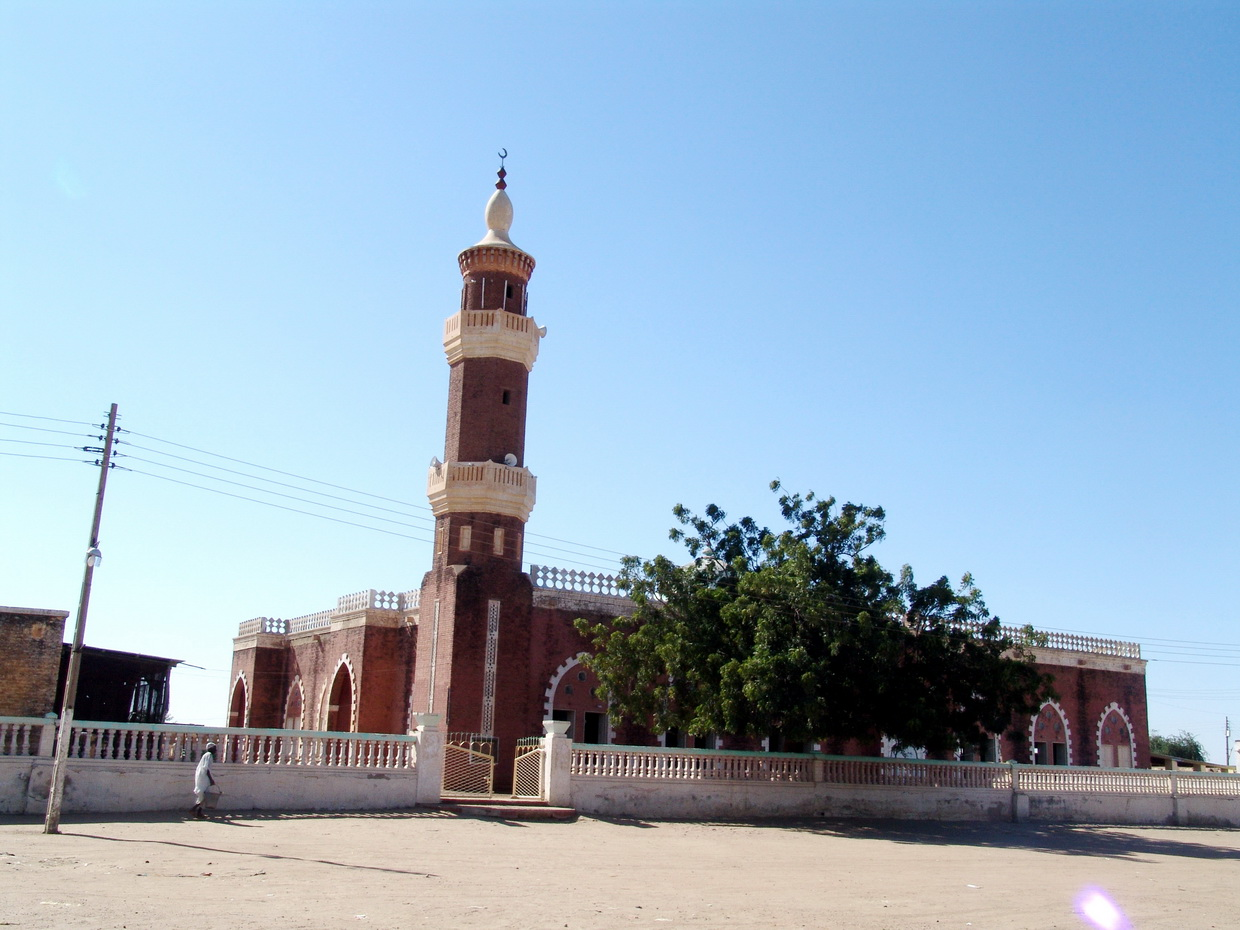
- The Old Mosque of Aba Island

- Aba Island massacre (Sudan)
- Location: 13°20′N 32°37′E; Aba Island, White Nile State
- Date: 27–29 March 1970
- Target: Ansar
- Attack type: Mass murder
- Deaths: 12,000
- Perpetrators: Sudan Armed Forces, Egyptian Airforces

The Aba Island massacre took place on 27 March 1970 and was committed against Ansar the followers of the Mahdi. The massacre which took place on Aba island, White Nile State, Sudan and killed around 12,000 people.

== Background ==
Aba island is the birthplace of Muhammad Ahmad who led the Mahdi revolution against the Anglo-Egyptian forces. Aba island has served as a pilgrimage spot for the religious Islamist followers of the Mahdi named Ansar. In November 1969 Gaafar Nimeiry came to power following a military coup. The Ansar-led opposition was opposed to the Coup, and the Leader of the Ansar Al-Hadi al-Mahdi withdrew to his followers to Aba Island. In March 1970 Nimeiri tried to visit the island to talk with Al-Hadi al-Mahdi, but was prevented by demonstrations.

== The massacre ==
The massacre happened on 27 March 1970 when the president of Sudan Gaafar Nimeiry responded to the huge demonstration led by the opposition party National Front against him in Khartoum. With the help of Egyptian Air Force (allegedly commanded by a young air force chief of staff Hosni Mubarak) Nimeiry bombed the island. Aba Island which had a population of around 40,000 Ansar was decimated in the bombing which lasted around two days The attacked killed around 12,000 Ansar and lead to number of Coup attempts against Nimeiry.
