= Shakaba =

al-Shakaba is a community in Al Jazirah state, Sudan. It lies on the west shore of the Blue Nile near Barakat, to the south of Wad Madani. The village is within the Gezira scheme, which provides irrigation water for cotton cultivation.

After the Battle of Karari (2 September 1898) in which the Mahdist forces of the Khalifa were defeated by an Anglo-Egyptian army under General Herbert Kitchener, the Mahdi's family were forced to return to their original homes on Aba Island on the White Nile in September 1898. They were arrested there and sent east to Shakaba. After hearing a rumor that the group was conducting Mahdist propaganda, a force of government troops fired on the group at random, killing Khalifa Muhammad Sharif and two of the Mahdi's sons, al-Fadil and al-Bushra. A third son, Abd al-Rahman al-Mahdi, was badly wounded. After he had recovered he was allowed to settle in Shakaba.

A 1907 account gave a different version of the events. It said "Khalifa Sherif preached Mahdism openly at Wad Madani; but he was captured by Captain N.M. Smyth, V.C., and tried by court-martial and shot". A footnote says he lived at Shakaba, forty miles from Sennar, and that the Mahdi's sons Fadil and Bishra were with him, but does not mention their death.
