= Al-Hadi al-Mahdi =

Sudanese political and religious figure (1918–1971)

Sayyid Hadi al-Mahdi
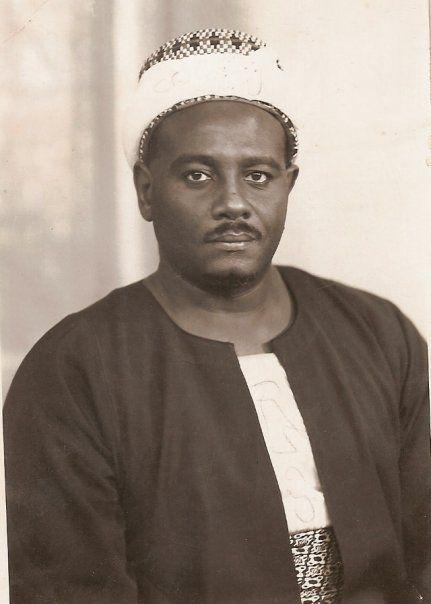

Personal details
- Born: 1918
- Died: 1971 (aged 53)
- Citizenship: Sudan
- Party: Umma Party
- Relations: Abd al-Mahdi (father); Bakhita Mustafa (mother)

Imam Al-Hadi Abdulrahman al-Mahdi (1918–1971) was a Sudanese political and religious figure. He was a leader of the Sudanese Ansar religious order and was also the uncle of fellow Umma party politician Sadiq al-Mahdi. The Umma party was largely divided between 1966 and 1969 as a result of a split between Al-Hadi and Sadiq.

In winter 1969 Al-Hadi was inciting the Ansar to take violent action against the government of Gaafar Nimeiry. In March 1970 he openly challenge Nimeiry by unleashing the Ansar into Omdurman to stage massive protest that was only suppressed by the army after great destruction of property and loss of life. Nimeiry mobilised a large flotilla, steamed up the White Nile to Aba Island, and on March 27 launched his elite forces on the Ansar, who resisted until overwhelmed by superior firepower. On March 30 Al-Hadi was trapped and killed near the Ethiopian border, whilst trying to escape, leaving behind around 12,000 Ansar dead on Aba Island. The extensive holdings of the Mahdi family were then confiscated, and on April 3 Sadiq al-Mahdi slipped into exile.
