= Muhammad Sharif (Kalifa) =

Sudanese Ansar leader (died 1899)

Sayyid Muhammad Sharif
- Born: Unknown
- Died: 1899
- Occupation: Kalifa or lieutenant of Muhammad Ahmad
- Known for: Leading a coup attempt by the Ashraf
- Spouse: Sharifa Zainab bint al-Mahdi
- Children: Husain al-Khalifa Muhammad Sharif
- Parent: Hamid Muhammad (father)

Sayyid Muhammad Sharif (died 1899) was one of the three Kalifas or lieutenants of Muhammad Ahmad (1844–1885), who styled himself the Mahdi, the others being Ali wad Hilu and Abdallahi ibn Muhammad. Muhammad Sharif was the son of Hamid Muhammad, first cousin of the Mahdi.

== Career ==
When Muhammed Ahmad died on 22 June 1885, in theory the Kalifas were jointly responsible for ruling the "Mahdiyah", as the Mahdist state of Sudan was known. In practice, Abdallahi ibn Muhammad was the effective ruler after dealing with challenges to his authority from members of the Mahdi's family, and became generally known as "The Kalifa".

In 1886, Khalifa Muhammad Sherif led a coup attempt by the Ashraf, kinsmen of the Mahdi, but Abdullahi defeated the challenge without difficulty. On 23 November 1891, Ashraf troops led by Muhammed Sharif surrounded the Mahdi's tomb and prepared for a showdown. The Khalifa did not trust his own forces, so negotiated an amnesty. Soon after, he took his revenge. The Khalifa would not kill any member of the family, but exiled their supporters from Omdurman and had them killed at Fashoda. When Muhammad Sharif objected to this action, the Kalifa arranged for him to be tried by a court with 44 judges. He was found guilty in March 1892 and imprisoned for a four-year term. The charge was that he planned to depose 'Abd Allahi and assume the caliphate himself.

== Death ==
After the Battle of Omdurman (2 September 1898) in which the Mahdist forces were defeated by an Anglo-Egyptian force led by General Herbert Kitchener, Khalifa Sherif surrendered to the British. Muhammad Sharif was placed under house arrest in the village of Shakaba near Wad Madani with two of the Mahdi's sons.

In 1899, hearing that they planned to join the Khalifa (who was still at large), the three were arrested. There was a skirmish when an attempt was made to rescue them. Sherif and the Mahdi's two sons were found guilty by a court martial trial and were shot. A different version of what happened is that the government heard a rumor that the group was conducting Mahdist propaganda. A force of government troops was dispatched which fired on the group at random, killing Khalifa Muhammad Sharif and two of the Mahdi's sons, al-Fadil and al-Bushra. A third son, Abd al-Rahman al-Mahdi, was badly wounded.

One of Muhammad Sharif's wives was the Sharifa Zainab bint al-Mahdi, daughter of the Mahdi, and their son, Husain al-Khalifa Muhammad Sharif (1888–1928), was a pioneer journalist in Anglo-Egyptian Sudan.
