= Sadiq al-Mahdi =

Prime Minister of Sudan (1966–1967, 1986–1989)

Sayyid Sadiq al-Mahdi
- الصادق المهدي
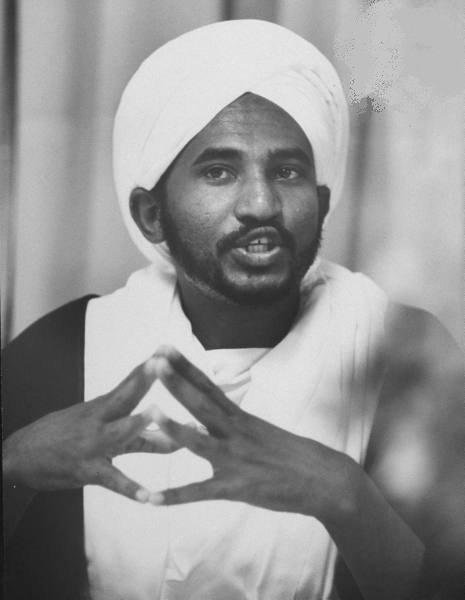
- al-Mahdi in 1964

6th Prime Minister of Sudan
- In office 6 May 1986 – 30 June 1989
- President: Ahmed al-Mirghani
- Preceded by: Al-Jazuli Daf'allah
- Succeeded by: Bakri Hassan Saleh (2017)
- In office 27 July 1966 – 18 May 1967
- President: Ismail al-Azhari
- Preceded by: Muhammad Ahmad Mahgoub
- Succeeded by: Muhammad Ahmad Mahgoub

Personal details
- Born: 25 December 1935 Al-Abasya, then part of Anglo-Egyptian Sudan
- Died: 26 November 2020 (aged 84) Abu Dhabi, United Arab Emirates
- Party: National Umma Party
- Relations: Muhammad Ahmad (great grandfather); Abd al-Rahman al-Mahdi (grandfather); Hadi al-Mahdi (uncle); Abdallah al-Fadil al-Mahdi (uncle)
- Children: Siddig, Bushra, Ribah, Randa, Mariam
- Parent(s): Siddick Sayed el-Mahdi; Rahma Abdullah Jadallah
- Education: Victoria College, Alexandria; Khartoum University College; St John's College, Oxford

Sadiq al-Mahdi (Arabic: الصادق المهدي, romanized: aṣ-Ṣādiq al-Mahdī; 25 December 1935 – 26 November 2020), also known as Sadiq as-Siddiq, was a Sudanese political and religious figure who was Prime Minister of Sudan from 1966 to 1967 and again from 1986 to 1989. He was head of the National Umma Party and Imam of the Ansar, a Sufi order that pledges allegiance to Muhammad Ahmad (1844–1885), who claimed to be the Mahdi, the messianic saviour of Islam.

== Political life ==
Sadiq al-Mahdi was Prime Minister of Sudan on two occasions: first briefly between 1966 and 1967 and second from 1986 until his ousting on 30 June 1989.

=== First term as prime minister (1966–1967) ===
After the 1965 elections, a coalition government was formed between the National Umma Party and the National Unionist Party. Muhammad Ahmad Mahgoub of the Umma party became prime minister, and Ismail al-Azhari of the NUP became president. However, this coalition collapsed in October 1965 after the two parties failed to agree on control of the Ministry of Foreign Affairs. In July 1966, Prime Minister Mahgoub resigned after a parliamentary vote of censure.

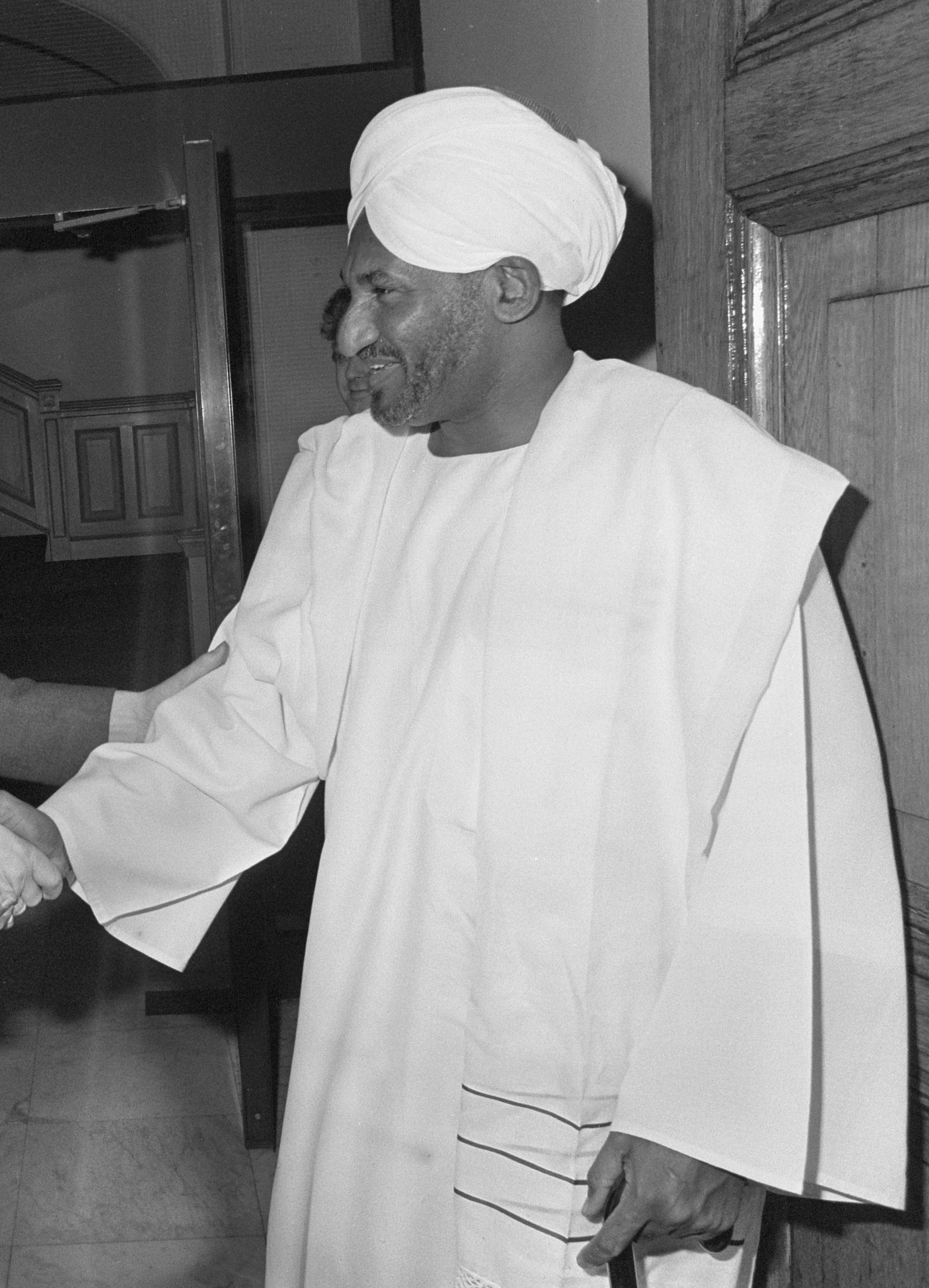
Sadiq al-Madi in 1987

Mahgoub's resignation split the Umma party into two factions: the opposition faction was led by Mahgoub and endorsed by Sadiq's uncle, the Imam al-Hadi al-Mahdi, while Sadiq led the faction that was willing to work with the NUP. As Sadiq's faction was larger, he became prime minister with NUP support. He supported regional development and greater autonomy for the southern provinces. These proposals were unpopular with many educated Sudanese civilians and army officers. In May 1967, Sadiq lost the support of his coalition partners, and Mahgoub returned as prime minister in a coalition with the National Unionist Party and the People's Democratic Party. In the 1968 elections, Sadiq's faction won more seats than Mahgoub's faction, but Sadiq lost his own seat to a candidate from Mahgoub's faction.

=== In the opposition (1967–1986) ===
Jaafar Nimeiry took power in Sudan through a coup on 25 May 1969. After the attack on Aba Island in March 1970, Sadiq was imprisoned repeatedly by Nimeiry, finally going into exile in 1974. From abroad, Sadiq formed an opposition organization known as the National Front. In 1977, Sadiq and Nimeiry negotiated an agreement that freed 1,000 political prisoners, granted amnesty to Sadiq, allowed nonpartisan opposition candidates in Parliament, and planned further democratic reforms. Sadiq then returned and started forming an opposition to Nimeiry's Sudanese Socialist Union.

=== Second term as prime minister (1986–1989) ===
After the 1986 elections, Sadiq formed a coalition government comprising the Umma Party (which he led); the National Islamic Front (led by his brother-in-law, Hassan al-Turabi); the Democratic Unionist Party (led by Mohammed Uthman al-Mirghani al-Khatim); and four small Southern parties. However, this coalition proved to be unstable, preventing Sadiq from delivering on his promises to end the Second Sudanese Civil War and fix the ongoing economic crisis. On 30 June 1989, his government was overthrown in a coup led by Brigadier Omar al-Bashir. The post of Prime Minister of Sudan was then abolished.

==== Actions during the Second Sudanese Civil War ====
He established a new Ministry of Peace and the Constitution. He met with John Garang on 31 July 1986 at the OAU summit in Addis Ababa, those 9 hours were fruitless as they both were confident in their military strength.

Between 5 and 11 of August 1986 a 25-member delegation from the National Alliance for the Salvation of the Country (NASC) met with a 31-member delegation from the SPLM/A. The meetings were candid but amicable and practical, and both sides were optimistic that this was a positive beginning to ending their differences.

On 26 August 1986 a Shilluk contingent of the SPLA shot down with a Soviet SAM-7 missile a Sudan Airways Fokker Friendship approaching Makkal, killing sixty passengers. When he learnt about the tactless celebration by gloating SPLA commanders, Sadiq denounced the SPLA as a “terrorist group”. He then unleashed the Anyanya II to destroy a wide swath of Shilluk villages, which precipitated a mass migration of Shilluk IDPs to the North.

=== 1989 coup and afterwards ===
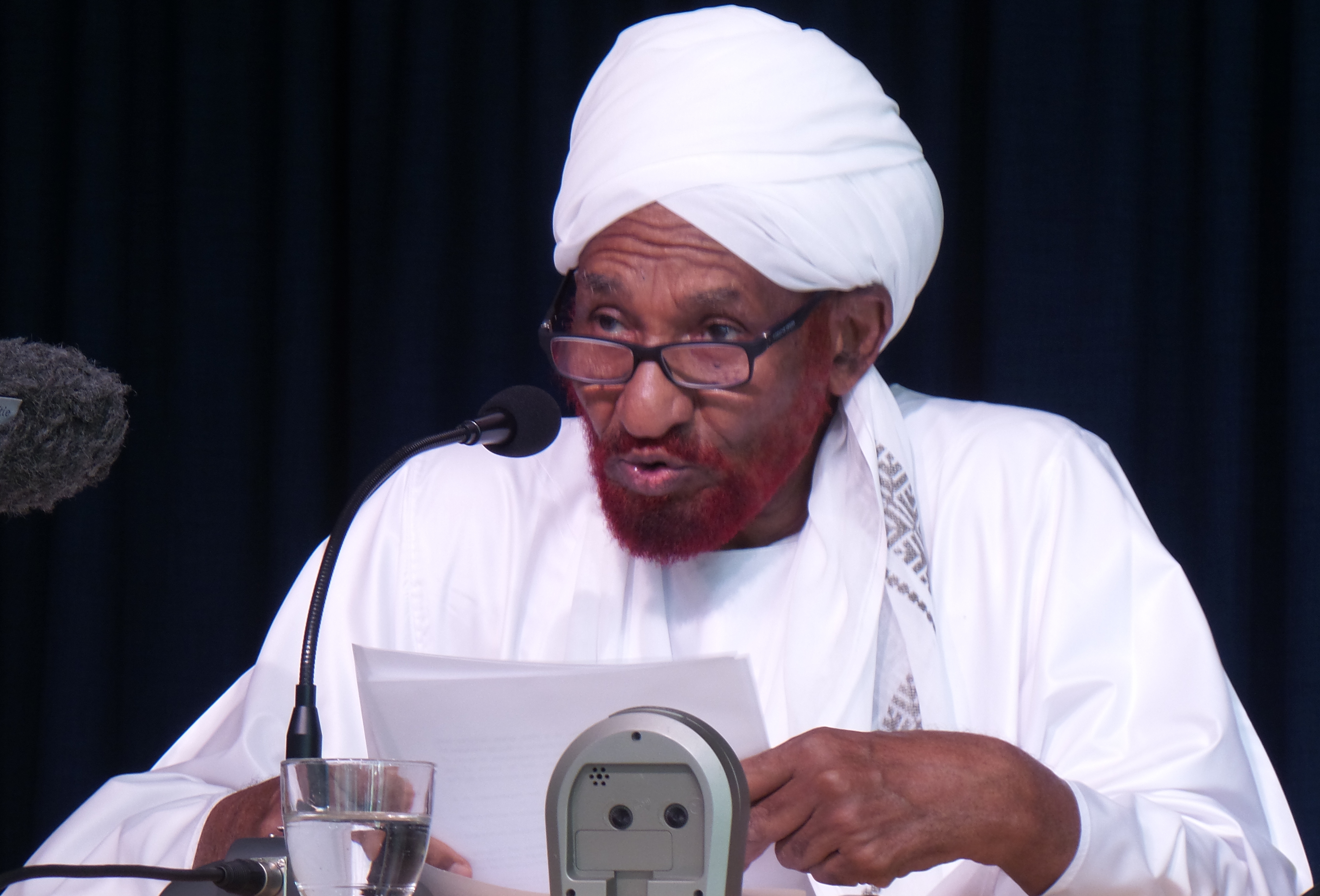
Mahdi in 2015

Sadiq continued to lead the Umma Party in opposition to Bashir after being ousted. He spent a period in exile, but eventually returned to Sudan in November 2000. As a former head of government, he joined the Club of Madrid.

He ran unsuccessfully for the 2010 presidential elections, pledging not to hand Bashir to the International Criminal Court to face charges of crimes against humanity and war crimes on the grounds that it would destabilize the country. In 2014, the government alleged that Sadiq had collaborated with rebels, forcing him to flee to Egypt. He eventually returned to Khartoum on 26 January 2017.

In April 2019, Bashir was himself ousted by a coup after months of mass protests. Sadiq affirmed his party's support for the protests and confirmed that they would not be part of any future civilian transitional government. He also opined that Sudan should join the International Criminal Court and hand over Bashir to face charges. In May 2019, Sadiq announced his retirement from electoral politics.

On October 24, 2020, as Sudan began to normalize diplomatic relations with Israel, Mahdi strongly condemned the move, while accusing U.S. president Donald Trump (a chief facilitator of the deal) of being racist against Muslims and black people, and calling Israel an "apartheid state."

== Personal life ==
Sadiq al-Mahdi was born on 25 December 1935 in Al-Abasya, Omdurman, Sudan. He was educated at Victoria College, Alexandria, and Khartoum University College, before reading philosophy, politics, and economics at St John's College, Oxford (1954–1957).

He was the paternal grandson of Sayyid Abd al-Rahman al-Mahdi, founder of the Umma Party, and great-grandson of Muhammad Ahmad, the Sudanese sheikh of the Ansar and self-proclaimed Mahdi who started the Mahdist War to end Egyptian rule in Sudan. He was also the paternal uncle of Sudanese-British actor Alexander Siddig.

Sadiq al-Mahdi married twice and had ten children, including a son named Siddig after his grandfather al-Imam al-Siddiq, born in 1968, who is now a leader in National Umma Party, and a daughter, Mariam, who is the leader of the National Umma Party.

On 26 November 2020, Sadiq died of complications from COVID-19, after being admitted to a hospital in Abu Dhabi, United Arab Emirates, for nearly a month.

== Publishing career ==
He was the author of a variety of scholarly and political books, including The Southern Question (1964); Speeches in Exile (1976); Questions on Mahadism (1979); Legitimate Penalties and Their Position in the Islamic Social System (1987); Democracy in Sudan: Will Return and Triumph (1990); Challenges of the Nineties (1991). In addition to his political career, he is remembered for helping theorize and explicate "a new kind of religious thought which would draw out of the Qur’an and Hadith a shari‘a which was adapted to the needs of the modern world." Professor of History Albert Hourani characterizes Sadiq's intellectual contributions as "responsible but bold."

== See also ==
- First Sudanese Civil War (1955–1972) between North and South Sudan
- Second Sudanese Civil War (1983–2005), a continuation of the First Sudanese Civil War
- Darfur Conflict (since 2003, ongoing as of 2024)

Political offices
Preceded by Muhammad Ahmad Mahgoub	Prime Minister of Sudan; 1966–1967	Succeeded by Muhammad Ahmad Mahgoub
Preceded by Al-Jazuli Daf'allah	Prime Minister of Sudan; 1986–1989	Vacant Title next held by Bakri Hassan Saleh
