= The Mahdi's tomb =

Tomb of Muhammad Ahmad in Omdurman, Sudan

The Mahdi's Tomb
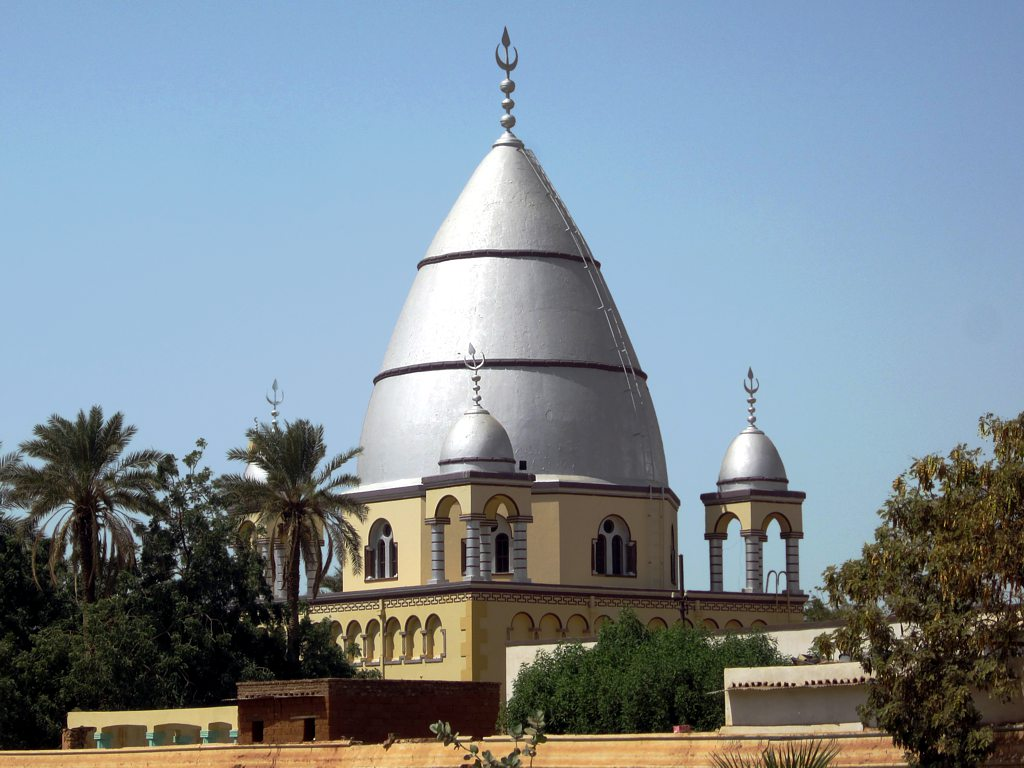

- Location within Sudan

General information
- Type: Qubba
- Location: Omdurman, Sudan
- Coordinates: 15°38′23″N 32°29′20″E
- Completed: 1885
- Renovated: 1947

The Mahdi's tomb or qubba (Arabic: قُبَّة) is located in Omdurman, Sudan. It was the burial place of Muhammad Ahmad, the self-proclaimed Mahdi and the leader of an Islamic revolt against Turco-Egyptian Sudan in the late 19th century.

The Mahdist State was established in 1885 after the Siege of Khartoum. Muhammad Ahmad died shortly after this Mahdist victory and was buried at Omdurman. The Mahdist State was led by Ahmad's successor, the Khalifa Abdullahi, until 1898 when an Anglo-Egyptian force, led by Lord Kitchener, defeated the Mahdists at the Battle of Omdurman. This victory marked the success of Kitchener's reconquest of Sudan. After the Battle, Ahmad's tomb was seriously damaged by naval gunfire on Lord Kitchener's orders.

The tomb was reconstructed in 1947 under the direction of the Ahmad's son, Abdul Rahman al-Mahdi. It is located next to the Khalifa House Museum. The tomb has been listed as a site of 'outstanding cultural value' by UNESCO.

== Background ==
=== The Mahdiyya ===
In 1881, Muhammad Ahmad proclaimed himself the Mahdi, successor of the Islamic prophet Muhammad. He called his followers to join a jihad against Turco-Egyptian Sudan. Extortionate fiscal burdens administered by this government since its establishment in the 1820s had created widespread discontent among the Sudanese. Increasing European dominance over the Egyptian administration in the 1870s led to the appointment of European and American representatives into positions of power. The fact that many of these were Christian, like General Charles Gordon, threw the religious status of the occupation into question for Sudanese Muslims. Furthermore, European pressure on the Egyptian government to suppress the slave trade in Sudan created powerful resentment in Sudan especially among trading classes like the jallaba.

Galvanised by widespread resentment for Ottoman-Egyptian rule, discontented members of Sudanese tribes and Sufi orders joined the Mahdist army. The Ahmad united his Sufi and non-Sufi followers by naming them anṣār, after the earliest followers of Muhammad. The Mahdist state was established after four years of fighting, ending in the 1885 Siege of Khartoum where the British governor-general of Sudan, General Gordon, was killed. Ahmad died unexpectedly six months after this victory and was buried at Omdurman. During the period of Mahdist rule, his tomb became the most sacred site in Sudan.

=== Desecration of the tomb ===
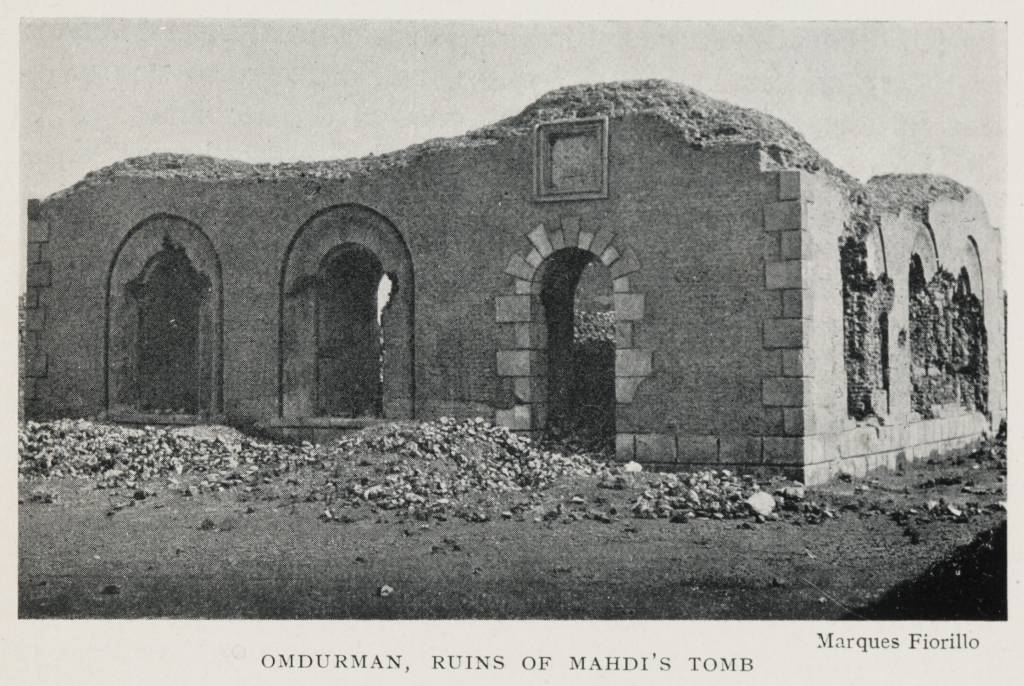
Ruins of the Mahdi's tomb (1906)

In 1896 a British force was sent to reconquer Sudan. Many saw this as retribution for the death of General Gordon, which had caused a wave of patriotic outrage amongst the British. After the Battle of Omdurman, the dome of the qubba was destroyed by gunboat fire from Kitchener's small Nile fleet. The body of the Mahdi was disinterred and beheaded. This symbolic decapitation echoed General Gordon's death at the hands of the Mahdist forces in 1885. The headless body of the Mahdi was thrown into the Nile. Lord Kitchener kept Ahmad's skull and it was rumoured that he intended to use it as a drinking cup or ink well. and, in the words of Winston Churchill, "carried off the Mahdi's head in a kerosene can as a trophy". Allegedly the skull was later buried at Wadi Halfa.

== Controversy ==
News of the desecration of the Mahdi's tomb reached a shocked British audience. There was some argument that this treatment was justified due to the perceived ‘savage’ nature of the Mahdist forces. However, there was also widespread respect for the Mahdist forces as fighting men, particularly among British soldiers. The success by the anṣār in breaking the British military square was famously remembered in Rudyard Kipling's poem 'Fuzzy-Wuzzy' (a derogatory term for the people of the Beja tribe, many of whom fought in the Mahdist army). Eventually Lord Kitchener was required to write a letter of apology to Queen Victoria for the actions of his troops after the Battle of Omdurman, particularly in relation to the desecration of the Mahdi's tomb and the treatment of his body.

== Fragments of the Mahdi's tomb in the UK ==
Fragments of the tomb were taken back to Britain as trophies and many of these fragments are now held in cultural institutions in the UK. At least three of the large brass finials from the domes of the tomb survive. One is held at the Royal Engineers Museum in Kent, another is held at Blair Castle in Scotland and one is at the Khalifa House Museum in Omdurman, located next to the reconstructed tomb of the Mahdi.
