= Battle of Aba =

First battle of the Mahdist War

- Part of the Mahdist War
Date	12 August 1881
Location	Aba Island, Egypt (now Sudan)
Result	Mahdist victory

Belligerents
Mahdist followers of Muhammad Ahmad (the Mahdi)	Egypt

Commanders and leaders
Muhammad Ahmad (the Mahdi) (WIA)	Mohammad Bey Abu Sa'ud 'Ali Effendi

Strength
311 ill-armed rebels	200 soldiers and one mountain-gun

Casualties and losses
12 killed and at least one wounded (Muhammad Ahmad)	120 killed and wounded, plus 9 taken prisoner

The Battle of Aba, which took place on 12 August 1881, was the opening battle of the Mahdist War. The incident saw Mahdist rebels, led by Muhammad Ahmad, who had proclaimed himself the Mahdi, rout Egyptian troops who had landed on Aba Island.

== Background ==
In March 1881, Muhammad Ahmad, living on Aba Island on the White Nile, before his "inner circle" (which included Abdallahi ibn Muhammad, who would become known as "the Khalifa"), announced that he was the Mahdi. He based this off of a dream he had where he was visited by Muhammad and Jesus. The Governor-General of the Sudan, Ra'uf Pasha, soon sent Mohammad Bey Abu Sa'ud to investigate the situation. Arriving on Aba Island on 7 August 1881, Abu Sa'ud requested that Muhammad Ahmad come to Khartoum (the capital of Sudan) to meet with the Governor-General. The Mahdi refused and Abu Sa'ud warned him that he "must give up his claim to be the Mahdi" and then left the island.

== Battle ==
After that meeting, an "arrest-party" of 200 Egyptian soldiers (and one mountain-gun) were sent to Aba Island on the ship Isma'iliyya. It was unclear who was the head of the expedition, Abu Sa'ud or his senior military officer, 'Ali Effendi, and the two quarreled. The ship arrived at Aba on 12 August 1881 and moored about a quarter of a mile from the Mahdi's village. Once there, Abu Sa'ud and 'Ali Effendi found themselves in disagreement over when to attack. The former wanted to wait until the following day to attack, while the latter (who won the argument) wanted to move out right away.

Using some merchants as guides, the Egyptian forces reached Muhammad Ahmad's hut and 'Ali Effendi burst into the shelter, shooting the man inside, who turned out to be a guest of the Mahdi. Muhammad Ahmad and his followers were waiting "in the dense bush outside the village." The zealous Mahdists, "armed with sticks, stones, hoes, and palm-knives, and a very few with spears and swords" attacked the Egyptians and completely overwhelmed them. The ground was muddy (it had rained during the Egyptians' march to the village) and this favored the bare-foot Mahdist rebels over the boot-clad government soldiers. The routed Egyptians made a dash for the Isma'iliyya. The Egyptians had suffered 120 casualties with nine of them taken prisoner. Of the Mahdi's forces, only twelve had been killed and Muhammad Ahmad, himself, was wounded after being shot in the right shoulder.

After learning of the disaster, Abu Sa'ud ordered the Isma'iliyya to shell the village. The Mahdists arrived on the banks of the river to taunt the Egyptians. The first shell missed the rebels by twenty yards, and, after that, the Mahdists walked out of range of the Isma'iliyya, ending the confrontation.

The Mahdi compared his victory to the Battle of Badr, Mohammad's first victory in battle.
