= Ansar (Sudan) =

Sudanese group, initially followers of the Mahdi Mohamad Ahmed

The Ansar (Arabic: أنصار supporter) are a Sufi religious movement in the Sudan whose followers are disciples of Muhammad Ahmad (12 August 1844 – 22 June 1885), a Sudanese religious leader based on Aba Island who proclaimed himself Mahdi on 29 June 1881. His followers won a series of victories against the Egyptians, culminating in the capture of Khartoum in January 1885.

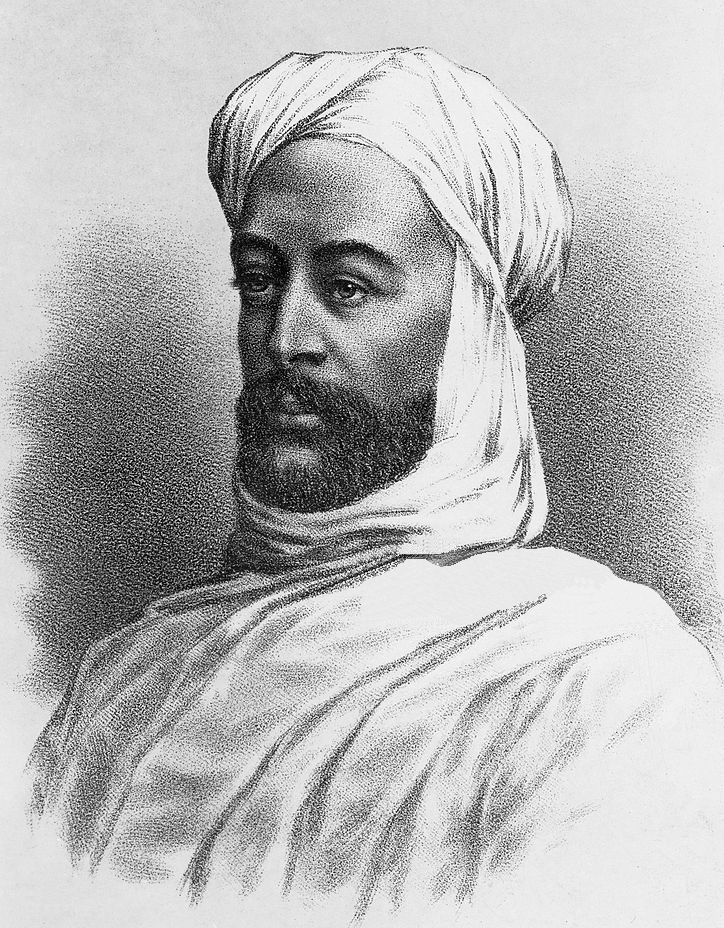
Muhammad Ahmad, who inspired the Ansar movement

When Muhammed Ahmad died a few months later, his successor, Abdallahi ibn Muhammad, maintained the independence of the Mahdist State until 1898, when an Anglo-Egyptian force re-conquered the area. The Mahdi's eldest surviving son, Abd al-Rahman al-Mahdi, was the religious and political leader of the Ansar throughout most of the colonial era of Anglo-Egyptian Sudan (1898–1955) and for a few years after the Sudan gained independence in January 1956. His descendants have led the movement since then.

== History ==
=== Mahdiyah ===
Muhammed Ahmad claimed to receive direct inspiration from God. After taking power in Sudan between 1883 and 1885, he established the Mahdist regime which was ruled using a modified version of sharia. Muhammed Ahmed appointed three Caliphs or lieutenants: Abdallahi ibn Muhammad, Ali wad Hilu, and his young cousin and son-in-law Muhammad Sharif. He emulated Muhammad, who was followed by the four Rashidun caliphs. Abdillahi corresponded to Abu Bakr, Ali wad Hilu to Umar, and Muhammad Sharif to Ali. Muhammad ibn Ali as-Senussi was to have taken the place of Uthman, but refused the honor. When the Mahdi died on 22 June 1885 a few months after capturing Khartoum, Abdillahi became head of state, although he had to deal with challenges from members of the Mahdi's family and Muhammad Sharif.

==== Followers of the Mahdī ====
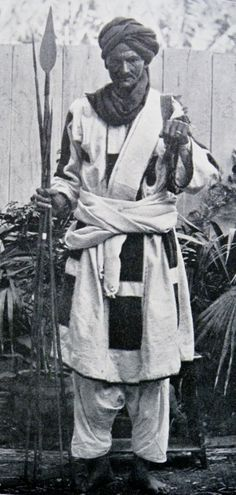
A Mahdist Dervish from Sudan (1899)

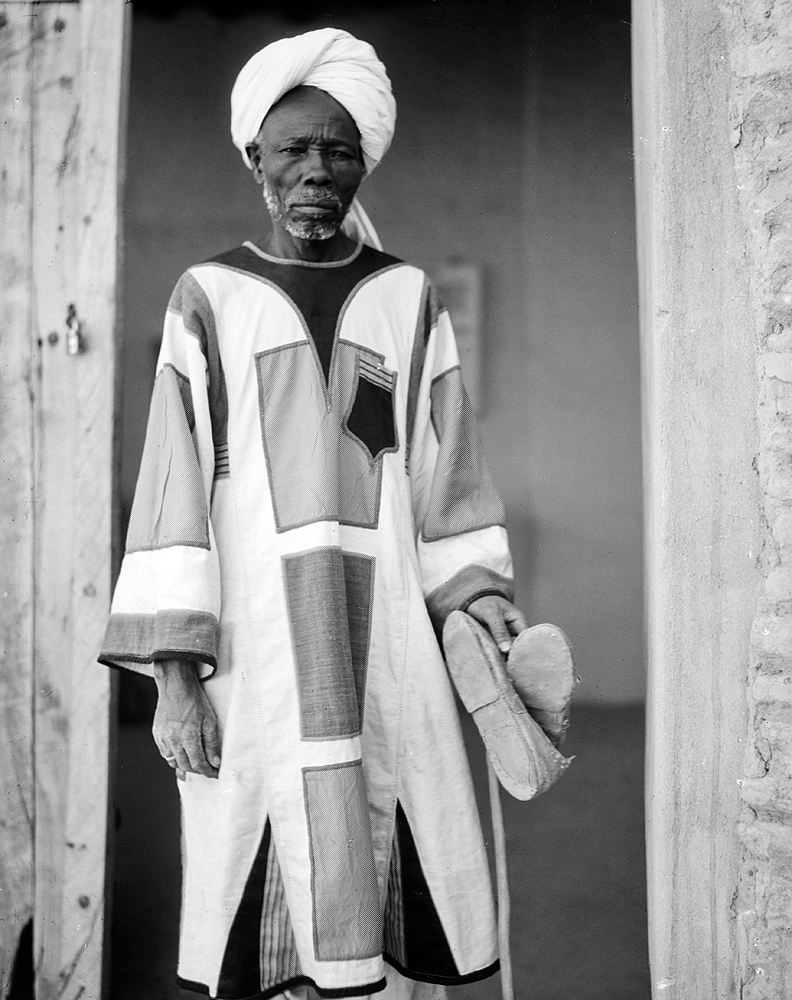
Mahdist in the Khalifa's House, Omdurman, wearing the distinctive patched uniform worn by the followers of the Mahdī

To distinguish his followers from adherents of other Sufi orders, Muhammad Ahmad forbade the use of the word dervish (Arabic darwīsh, pl. darawīsh) to describe his followers, replacing it with the title Anṣār, the term Muhammad used for the people of Medina who welcomed him and his followers after their flight from Mecca. "Dervish" was widely used in the Sudanese context to describe an affiliate of a Sufi denomination or, more specifically, a religious mendicant who chose to reject material wealth. By renaming his followers anṣār, the Mahdī unified his Sufi and non-Sufi followers under one name. Despite the Mahdī's prohibition, British soldiers and government officials continued to use the term to describe the Anṣār throughout the late 1880s and 1890s. It was used in a pejorative sense by British government officials such as Major FR Wingate of British Military Intelligence. On the other hand, British soldiers, in their accounts of the conflicts, often described the Mahdist "dervishes'" as brave and fearless and the word came to suggest a sense of respect and wonder in this context.

==== Mahdist state (1885–1898) ====
The Mahdist State was at first run on military lines as a jihad state, with the courts enforcing Islamic jurisprudence and the precepts of the Mahdi, which had equal force. Later, the Caliph established a more traditional administration. The state was expansionary, and engaged in wars with Ethiopia.

In 1892 General Herbert Kitchener was appointed commander of the Egyptian army. After careful preparations and a slow advance, on 2 September 1898 the main Anglo-Egyptian forces engaged with a Mahdist army of 52,000 at the Battle of Omdurman. With greatly superior firepower, the British won a decisive victory. Caliph Abdillahi fled, and a year later was killed with other Mahdist leaders at the Battle of Umm Diwaykarat (25 November 1899).

=== Abd al-Rahman al-Mahdi (1885–1959) ===
In 1899, after the fall of the Mahdist State the British government placed restrictions on the movements and activity of the Mahdi's son, Sayyid 'Abd al-Rahman al-Mahdi. However, he soon emerged as the leader of the Ansar. Throughout most of the colonial era of Anglo-Egyptian Sudan, the British government considered him important as a moderate leader of the Mahdists.

In the early 1920s, from 5,000 to 15,000 pilgrims were coming to Aba Island each year to celebrate Ramadan. Many of them identified Abd al-Rahman with the prophet Isa, the Islamic interpretation of Jesus, and assumed that he would drive the white Christian colonists out of Sudan. The British government found that Abd al-Rahman was in correspondence with agents and leaders in Nigeria and Cameroon, predicting the eventual victory of the Mahdists over the Christians. They blamed him for unrest in these colonies. After pilgrims from West Africa held mass demonstrations on Aba Island in 1924, the Sayyid was told to put a stop to the pilgrimages.

Ali al-Mirghani, leader of the Khatmiyya, was often in opposition to Abd al-Rahman and the Ansar. Both of these Sufi movements organized youth groups and supported competing parties in the run-up to independence. The Anglo-Egyptian treaty of 1936 discussed the future of Sudan, among other subjects. The Sudanese were not consulted. Educated Sudanese became increasingly concerned, and the Ansar appealed to many people in this group. The leaders portrayed the Mahdi to them as the first Sudanese nationalist and Abd al-Rahman was to many an attractive leader of the independence movement. In contrast, Ali al-Mirghani and the Khatmiyya became identified with the pro-Egyptian school of thought that favored unity of the Nile Valley.

In August 1944 'Abd al-Rahman met with senior Congress members and tribal leaders to discuss formation of a pro-independence political party that was not associated with Mahdism. In February 1945 the National Umma Party had been organized and the party's first secretary, Abdullah Khalil, applied for a government license. The constitution of the party made no mention of Sayyid 'Abd al-Rahman or of the Ansar. The only visible link to Abd al-Rahman was the party's reliance on him for funding.

Sayyid 'Abd al-Rahman died in 1959 aged 74. His son, Sadiq al-Mahdi, was imam of the Ansar for the next two years. After his death in 1961, he was succeeded as imam by his brother, Imam al-Hadi al-Mahdi, while al-Sadiq's son, Sadiq al-Mahdi, took over the leadership of the Umma Party.

=== Sadiq Al-Mahdi (1964–2020) ===
The National Umma Party of Sudan has generally been associated with the Ansar movement. Sadiq al-Mahdi, the grandson of Abd al-Rahman, was elected president of the Umma party in November 1964.

==== Military assault on Aba island (1970) ====
In November 1969 Gaafar Nimeiry became Prime Minister at the head of a mainly civilian government. Ansar-led conservative forces were opposed to the government, and Imam al-Hadi al-Mahdi withdrew to his base in Aba Island. In March 1970 Nimeiri tried to visit the island to talk with the imam, but was prevented by hostile crowds. Fighting later broke out between government forces opposed by up to 30,000 Ansar. Army units backed up by air support assaulted the island, and about 3,000 people were killed.

Sadiq Al-Mahdi was arrested in 1970, and for many years alternated between spells in prison in Sudan and periods of exile. In 1985 Sadiq al-Mahdi was again elected president of the Umma party. In the 1986 elections he became Prime Minister of Sudan, holding office until the government was overthrown in 1989. After further imprisonment and exile, Sadiq al-Mahdi returned to Sudan in 2000 and in 2002 was elected Imam of the Ansar. In 2003 Sadiq was re-elected President of Umma.

== Beliefs ==
According to the hadith, "no one will more resemble me than al-Mahdi". It is said that the Mahdi will appear "after hearts become hard and the earth is filled with wickedness". Following him, the Antichrist will appear, with all the accompanying signs that the Hour has come, one of which will be the descent of the Jesus. Sunnis believe that Jesus will slay al-Masih ad-Dajjal or "the False Messiah".

Muhammed Ahmed revealed himself as "al-Mahdi al-Muntazar", "the awaited guide in the right path", usually seen as the Mahdi. His mission was to redeem the faithful and to prepare the way for the second coming of the prophet Isa. His movement was fundamentalist, demanding a return to the early principles of Islam. Men were to abstain from alcohol and tobacco, and women were to be strictly secluded.

Ahmed taught that warfare was a duty incumbent upon all Muslims rather than the Hajj (pilgrimage to Mecca). The creed was altered to say that "Muhammad Ahmad is the Mahdi of God and the representative of His Prophet". Another change was that zakat (almsgiving) became a tax paid to the state.

== See also ==
- Fuzzy-Wuzzy
- Mahdist War
