= Muhammad Ahmad =

Sudanese religious and political leader (1843–1885)

- محمد أحمد
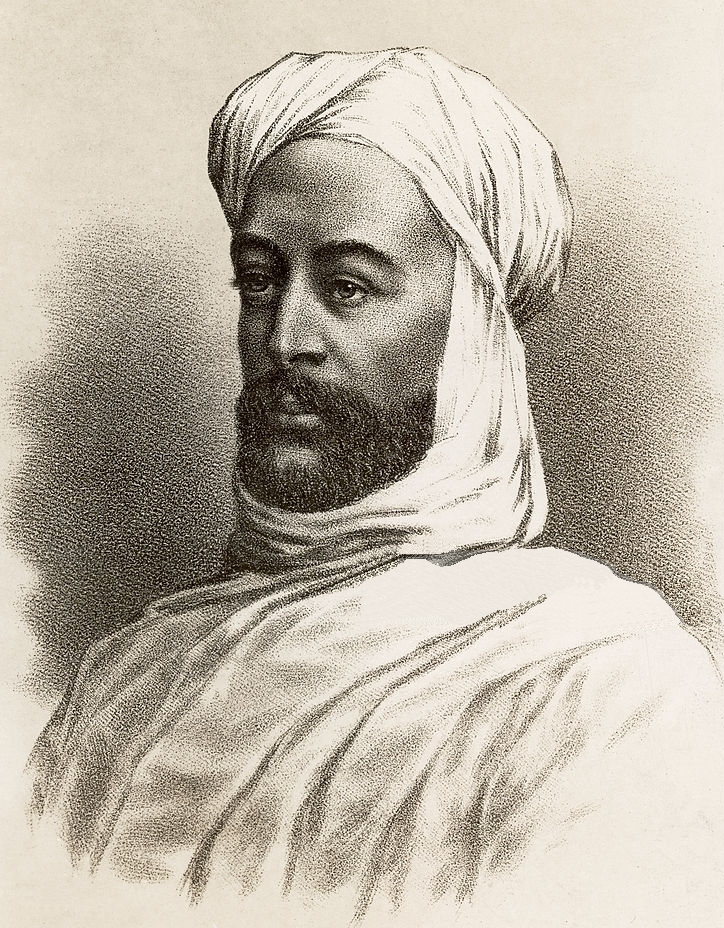
- Illustration of Muhammad, 1884

Mahdi (claimed)
- In office 1881–1885
- Preceded by: Position established
- Succeeded by: Abdallahi ibn Muhammad (as Khalifa)

Personal details
- Born: 12 August 1843 Labab Island, Dongola, Turco-Egyptian Sudan
- Died: 21 June 1885 (aged 41) Khartoum, Mahdist State
- Cause of death: Typhus
- Resting place: The Mahdi's tomb, Omdurman, Sudan
- Children: Abdul Rahman al-Mahdi
- Occupation: Politician; theologian; military leader
- Title: Mahdi

Personal life
- Main interest(s): Fiqh, Tafsir

Religious life
- Religion: Islam
- Denomination: Sunni
- Jurisprudence: Maliki
- Tariqa: Sammāniyya

Muḥammad Aḥmad ibn ʿAbd Allāh ibn Faḥal (Arabic: محمد أحمد بن عبد الله بن فحل; 12 August 1843 (Note: Various sources specify birth years of 1843, 1844, and 1848; see the citations under Authority conrol databases.) – 21 June 1885) was a Sudanese religious and political leader. In 1881, he claimed to be the Mahdi and led a war against Egyptian rule in Sudan, which culminated in a remarkable victory over them in the Siege of Khartoum. He created a vast Islamic state extending from the Red Sea to Central Africa and founded a movement that remained influential in Sudan a century later.

From his announcement of the Mahdist State in June 1881 until its end in 1899, the Mahdi's supporters, the Ansar, established many of its theological and political doctrines. After Muhammad Ahmad's unexpected death from typhus on 22 June 1885, his chief deputy, Abdallahi ibn Muhammad took over the administration of the nascent Mahdist State.

The Mahdist State, weakened by his successor's autocratic rule and inability to unify the populace to resist the British blockade and subsequent war, was dissolved following the Anglo-Egyptian conquest of Sudan, in 1899. Despite that, the Mahdi remains a respected figure in the history of Sudan. In the late 20th century, one of his direct descendants, Sadiq al-Mahdi, twice served as prime minister of Sudan (1966–1967 and 1986–1989) and pursued pro-democracy policies.

== Early life ==
Muhammad Ahmad bin Abdullah bin Fahal was born on 12 August 1843 in Labab Island, Dongola in northern Sudan. He was born into a notable religious Arabized Nubian family from the Danagla tribe tracing their lineage from the Prophet of Islam Muhammad through the lineage of his grandson Hassan. When Mohammed Ahmed was still a child, his family moved to the town of Karari, north of Omdurman. There his father, Ahmad bin Abdullah, managed to find enough supplies of wood for his work in boat-building, but died shortly after they arrived. After the death of his father, his brothers Mohammed and Hamed continued to trade and built boats. Then the family moved to live in Khartoum for a short time, where their mother, Zainab bint Nasr, died and was buried.

While his siblings joined his father's trade, Muhammad Ahmad showed a proclivity for religious study. He studied first under Sheikh al-Amin al-Suwaylih in the Gezira region south of Khartoum, and subsequently under Sheikh Muhammad al-Dikayr 'Abdallah Khujali near the town of Berber in northern Sudan.

Determined to live a life of asceticism, mysticism and worship, in 1861 he sought out Sheikh Muhammad Sharif Nur al-Dai'm, the grandson of the founder of the Samaniyya Sufi sect in Sudan. Muhammad Ahmad stayed with Sheikh Muhammad Sharif for seven years, during which time he was recognized for his piety and asceticism. Near the end of this period, he was awarded the title of Sheikh, and began to travel around the country on religious missions. He was permitted to give tariqa and Uhūd to new followers.

In 1870, his family moved again in search for timber, returning to Aba Island. There, Muhammad Ahmad built a mosque and started to teach the Quran. He soon gained a notable reputation among the local population as an excellent speaker and mystic. The broad thrust of his teaching followed that of other reformers: his Islam was one devoted to the words of Muhammad and based on a return to the virtues of strict devotion, prayer, and simplicity as laid down in the Quran.

In 1872, Muhammad Ahmad invited Sheikh Sharif to move to al-Aradayb, an area on the White Nile neighboring Aba Island. Despite initially amicable relations, in 1878 the two religious leaders had a dispute motivated by Sheikh Sharif's resentment of his former student's growing popularity. As a result, Sheikh Sharif expelled his former student from the Samaniyya Order and, despite numerous attempts at reconciliation by Muhammad Ahmad, his mentor refused to make peace.

After recognizing that the split with Sheikh Sharif was irreconcilable, Muhammad Ahmad approached another respected leader of the Samaniyya Order named Sheikh al-Qurashi wad al-Zayn. Muhammad Ahmad resumed his life of piety and religious devotion at Aba Island. During this period, he also traveled to the province of Kordofan, west of Khartoum, where he visited with the notables of the capital, El Obeid. They were enmeshed in a power struggle between two rival claimants to the governorship of the province.

On 25 July 1878, Sheikh al-Qurashi died and his followers recognized Muhammad Ahmad as their new leader. Around this time, Muhammad Ahmad first met Abdallahi bin Muhammad al-Ta'aishi, who was to become his chief deputy and successor in the years to come.

== Announcement of the Mahdiyya ==
On 29 June 1881, Muhammad Ahmad claimed to be the Mahdi so as to prepare the way for the second coming of Jesus. In part, his claim was based on his status as a prominent Sufi sheikh with a large following in the Samaniyya Order and among the tribes in the area around Aba Island.

Yet the idea of the Mahdiyya had been central to the belief of the Samaniyya prior to Muhammad Ahmad's pronouncement. The previous Samaniyya leader, Sheikh al-Qurashi Wad al-Zayn, had asserted that the long-awaited redeemer would come from the Samaniyya line. According to Sheikh al-Qurashi, the Mahdi would make himself known through a number of signs, some established in the early period of Islam and recorded in the Hadith literature. Others had a distinctly local origin, such as the prediction that the Mahdi would ride the sheikh's pony and erect a dome over his grave after his death.

Drawing from aspects of the Sufi tradition that were intimately familiar to both his followers and his opponents, Muhammad Ahmad claimed that he had been appointed as the Mahdi by a prophetic assembly or hadra (Arabic: Al-Hadra Al-Nabawiyya, الحضرة النبوية). A hadra, in the Sufi tradition, is a gathering of all the prophets from the time of Adam to Muhammad, as well as many Sufi holy men who are believed to have reached the highest level of affinity with the divine during their lifetime. The hadra is chaired by Muhammad, known as Sayyid al-Wujud, and at his side are the seven Qutb, the most senior of whom is known as Ghawth az-Zaman. The hadra was also the source of a number of central beliefs about the Mahdi, including that he was created from the sacred light at the centre of Muhammad's heart, and that all living creatures had acknowledged the Mahdi's claim since his birth.

Muhammad Ahmad framed the Mahdiyya as a return to the early days of Islam, when the Muslim community, or Ummah, was unified under the guidance of Muhammad and his immediate successors. Later, in order to distinguish his followers from adherents of other Sufi sects, the Mahdi forbade the use of the word darwish (commonly known as "dervish" in English) to describe his followers, replacing it with the title Ansār, the term which Muhammad used for the people of Medina who welcomed him and his followers after their flight from Mecca.

== Response of the scholars ==
Despite his popularity among the clerics of the Samaniyya and other sects, and among the tribes of western Sudan, some of the Ulama' (scholars), or orthodox religious authorities, rejected Muhammad Ahmad's claim as the Mahdi. Among his most prominent critics were the Sudanese Ulema loyal to the Ottoman Sultan and employed by the Turco-Egyptian government. Examples were the Mufti Shakir al-Ghazi, who sat on the Council of Appeal in Khartoum, and the Qadi Ahmad al-Azhari in Kordofan. These critics were careful not to deny the concept of the Mahdi as such, but rather to discredit Muhammad Ahmad's claim to it.

They pointed out that Muhammad Ahmad's manifestation did not conform to the prophecies laid out in the Hadith literature. In particular, they argued for the political interests of the Turco-Egyptian government and the British, that his manifestation did not conform with the "time of troubles" "when the land is filled with oppression, tyranny, and enmity".

== Advance of the rebellion ==
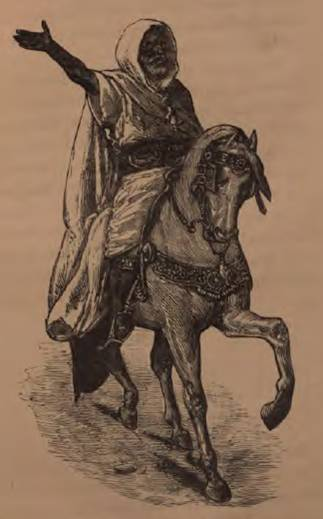
Muhammad Ahmad, The Mahdi of Sudan, Charles Chaillé-Long, 1884

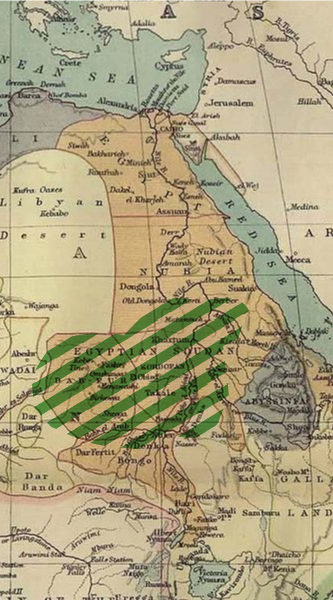
Extent of the Mahdi rebellion in 1885 (green hatching)

When Governor General Muhammad Rauf Pasha in Khartoum learned of the 29 June 1881 declaration by Muhammad Ahmad as the Mahdi, he believed that the man would be satisfied with a government pension, and he sent Ahmad a friendly letter. The Mahdi telegraphed an uncompromising reply, saying, "He who does not believe in me will be purified by the sword."

Mohammed Rauf Pasha sent a small party to arrest the Mahdi on Aba Island, but on 11 August 1881 it was overwhelmed, and the insurrection in southern Sudan began to grow. Rauf Pasha downplayed the "affray" in his report to Cairo, and sent the governor of Kordofan to Aba Island with 1,000 soldiers to crush the Mahdi. When they arrived, they found the Mahdi had fled to the southwest. The soldiers marched after him, but gave up the pursuit when the September rains flooded the roads and riverbeds; they returned to El Obeid. The Mahdi established a new base in the Nuba Mountains.

The Mahdi and a party of his followers, the Ansār (helpers, known in the West as "the Dervishes"), made a long march to Kurdufan. There he gained numerous recruits, especially from the Baqqara, and notable leaders such as Sheikh Madibbo ibn Ali of the Rizeigat and Abdallahi ibn Muhammad of the Ta'aisha tribes. They were also joined by the Hadendoa Beja, who were rallied to the Mahdi in 1883 by Osman Digna, an Ansār captain in eastern Sudan.

The Mahdist revolution was backed by the northern and western regions of Sudan. It also found great support from the Nuer, Shilluk and Anuak tribes of southern Sudan, in addition to the tribes of Bahr Alghazal. This widespread support affirmed that the Mahdist Revolution was a national rather than regional revolution. In addition to unifying different tribes, the revolution cut across religious divides, despite its religious origins. The Mahdi was supported by non-Muslims and Muslims alike. This had important implications for the slave trade. Going against traditional Islamic injunctions, the Mahdi allowed the enslavement of free Muslims, if they did not support him, and forbade the enslavement of traditional victims, non-Muslims, if they supported him.

Late in 1883, the Ansār, armed only with spears and swords, overwhelmed a 4,000-man Egyptian force not far from El Obeid, and seized their rifles and ammunition. The Mahdi followed up this victory by laying siege to El Obeid and starving it into submission after four months. The town remained the headquarters of the Ansār for much of the decade.

The Ansār, now 40,000 strong, defeated an 8,000-man Egyptian relief force led by British officer William Hicks near Kashgil, in the Battle of Shaykan. The defeat of Hicks also resulted in the fall of Darfur to the Ansār, which until then had been effectively defended by Rudolf Carl von Slatin. Jabal Qadir in the south was also taken. The western half of Sudan was now firmly in Ansārī hands.

Their success emboldened the Hadendoa, who under the generalship of Osman Digna wiped out a smaller force of Egyptians under the command of Colonel Valentine Baker near the Red Sea port of Suakin. Major General Gerald Graham was sent with a force of 4,000 British soldiers and defeated Digna at El Teb on 29 February. Two weeks later he suffered high casualties at Tamai, and Graham eventually withdrew his forces.

== Khartoum ==
After much debate the British decided to abandon Sudan in December 1883, holding only several northern towns and Red Sea ports, such as Khartoum, Kassala, Sannar, and Sawakin. The evacuation of Egyptian troops and officials, and other foreigners from Sudan was assigned to General Charles George Gordon, who had been reappointed governor general with orders to return to Khartoum and organize a withdrawal of the Egyptian garrisons there.

=== Arrival of Gordon ===
Gordon reached Khartoum in February 1884. At first he was greeted with jubilation, as many of the tribes in the immediate area were at odds with the Mahdists. Transportation northward was still open and the telegraph lines intact. But the uprising of the Beja soon after his arrival changed things considerably, reducing communications to runners.

Gordon considered the routes northward to be too dangerous to extricate the garrisons and so pressed for reinforcements to be sent from Cairo to help with the withdrawal. He also suggested that his old enemy Al-Zubayr Rahma Mansur, a fine military commander, be given tacit control of the Sudan in order to provide a counter to the Ansār. London rejected both proposals, and so Gordon prepared for a fight.

In March 1884, Gordon tried to stage an offensive to clear the road northward to Egypt, but a number of the officers in the Egyptian force went over to the enemy and their forces fled the field after firing a single salvo. This convinced him that he could carry out only defensive operations, and he returned to Khartoum to construct defensive works.

By April 1884, Gordon had managed to evacuate some 2,500 of the foreign population who had been able to make the trek northwards. His mobile force under Colonel Stewart returned to Khartoum after repeated incidents when the 200 or so Egyptian forces under his command would turn and run at the slightest provocation.

=== Siege ===
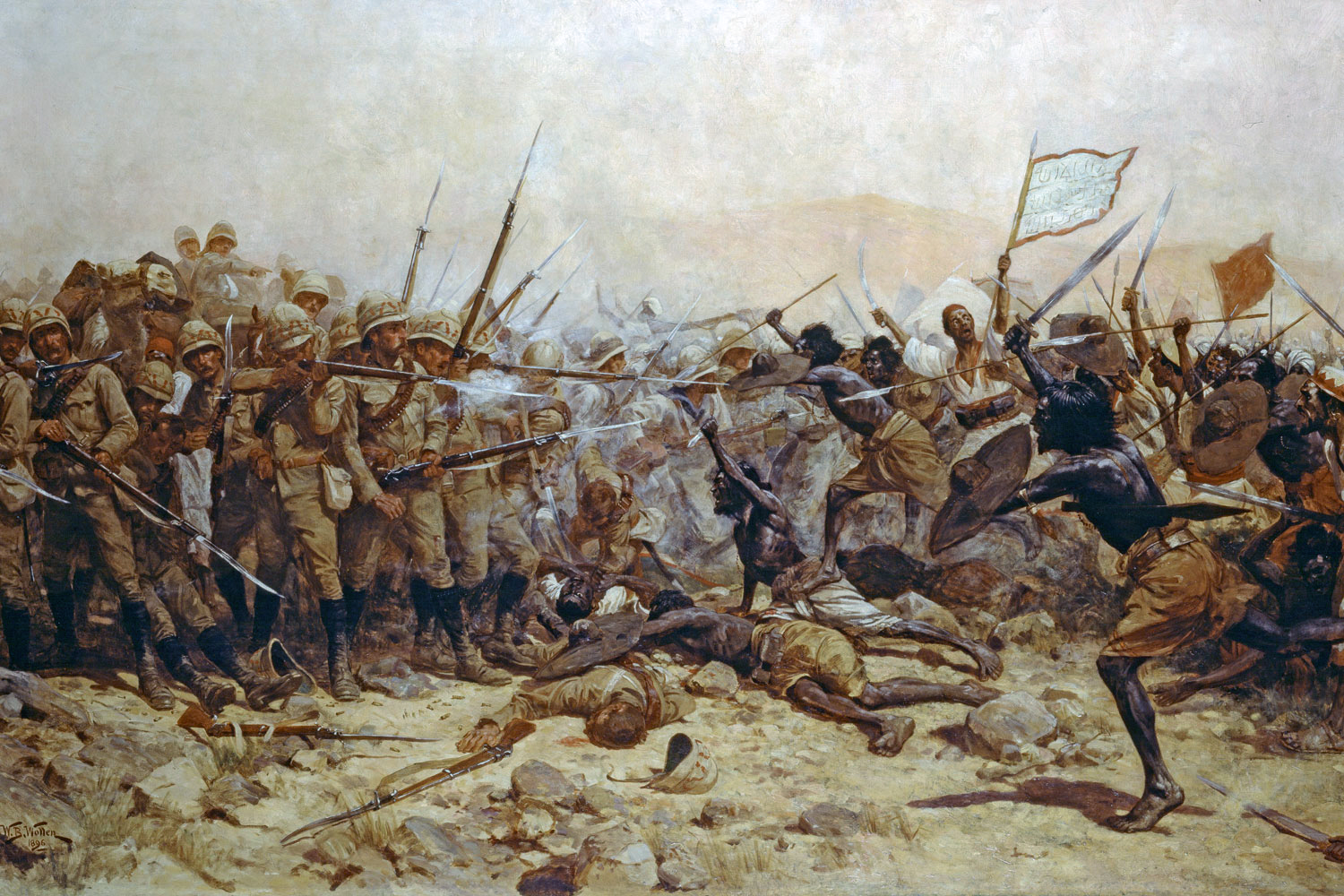
A depiction of the British square at the Battle of Abu Klea, during the Mahdist War, 1885

That month the Ansār besieged Khartoum, and Gordon was completely cut off. But his defensive works, consisting mainly of mines, proved so frightening to the Ansār that they were unable to penetrate the city. Once the waters rose, Stewart used gunboats on the Nile to conduct several small skirmishes and in August managed to recapture Berber for a short time. But Stewart was killed soon after in another foray from Berber to Dongola, a fact Gordon learned only in a letter from the Mahdi himself.

Under increasing pressure from the public to support Gordon, the British Government under Prime Minister Gladstone eventually had ordered Lord Garnet Joseph Wolseley to relieve Gordon. He was already deployed in Egypt due to the attempted coup there earlier, and organized a large force of infantry, but advanced at an extremely slow rate. Realizing they would take some time to arrive, Gordon pressed Wolseley to send forward a "flying column" of camel-borne troops across the Bayyudah Desert from Wadi Halfa under the command of Brigadier-General Sir Herbert Stewart. This force was attacked by the Hadendoa Beja, or "Fuzzy Wuzzies", twice, first at the Battle of Abu Klea and two days later closer to Metemma. Twice the British square held and the Mahdists were repelled with high losses.

At Metemma, 100 miles (160 km) north of Khartoum, Wolseley's advance guard met four of Gordon's steamers, sent downriver to provide speedy transport for the first relieving troops. They gave Wolseley a dispatch from Gordon claiming that the city was about to fall. Moments later a runner brought in another message, claiming the city could hold out for a year. Deciding to believe the latter, the force stopped while they refit the steamers to hold more troops.

=== Fall of Khartoum ===
They finally reached Khartoum on 28 January 1885, to find the town had fallen two days earlier during the siege of Khartoum. After the Nile had receded from flood stage, one of Gordon's pashas (officers), Faraz Pasha, had opened the river gates and let the Ansār in. The garrison was slaughtered, the male population massacred, and the women and children enslaved. Gordon was killed fighting the Mahdi's warriors on the steps of the palace, where he was hacked to pieces and beheaded. When Gordon's head was unwrapped at the Mahdi's feet, he ordered the head to be fixed between the branches of a tree "where all who passed it could look in disdain, children could throw stones at it and the hawks of the desert could sweep and circle above." When Wolseley's force arrived in Khartoum, they retreated after attempting to force their way to the center of the town on ships, where they were met by a hail of gunfire.

The Mahdi Army continued its sweep of victories. Kassala and Sannar fell soon after and, by the end of 1885, the Ansār had begun to move into the southern regions of Sudan. In all of Sudan, only Suakin, reinforced by Indian troops, and Wadi Halfa on the northern frontier remained in Anglo-Egyptian hands.

=== Death and succession ===
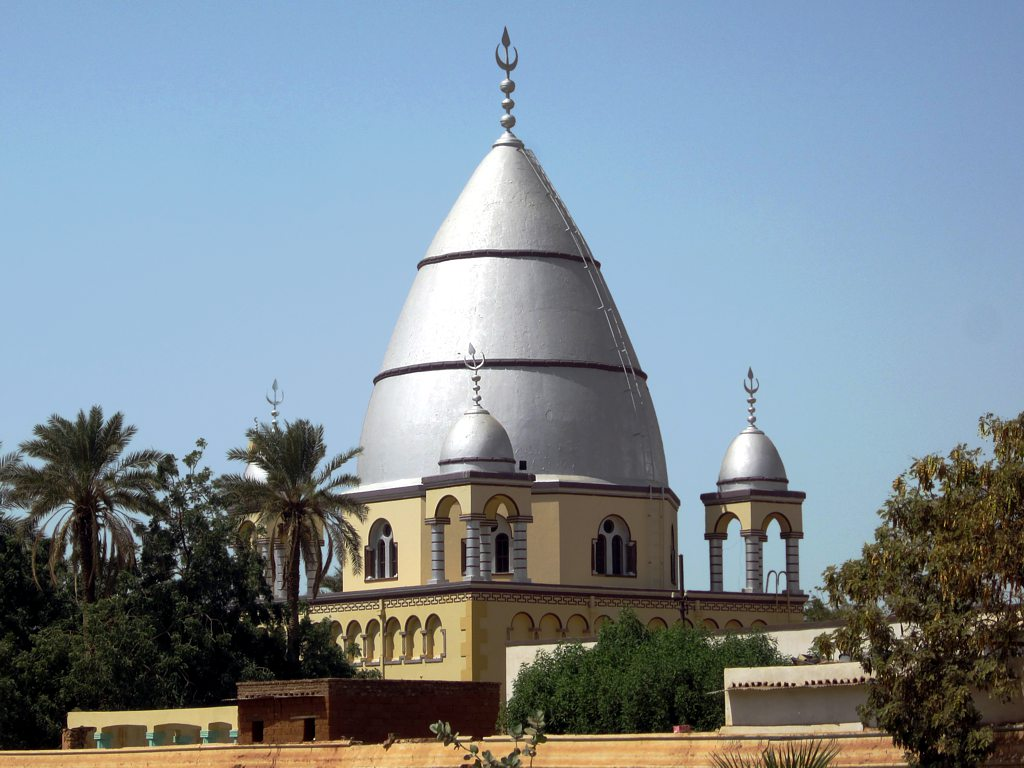
The rebuilt tomb of Muhammad Ahmad in Omdurman

Five months after the capture of Khartoum, Muhammad Ahmad died of typhus. He was buried in Omdurman near the ruins of Khartoum. The Mahdi had planned for this eventuality and had chosen three deputies to replace him.

After the final defeat of the Khalifa by the British under General Kitchener in 1898, Muhammad Ahmad's tomb was destroyed to prevent it from becoming a rallying point for his supporters. His bones were thrown into the Nile. Kitchener was said to have retained his skull and, in the words of Winston Churchill, "carried off the Mahdi's head in a kerosene can as a trophy". Allegedly the skull was later buried at Wadi Halfa. The tomb was eventually rebuilt.

== Aftermath ==
=== Political heritage ===
The flag of Sudan. The black represents the black flag of nationalists who fought colonial rule during the Mahdist Revolution, late in 19th century.

Muhammed Ahmad's son, Abd al-Rahman al-Mahdi, born after his father's death, whom the British considered important as a popular leader of the Mahdists, became a leader of the neo-Mahdist movement in the Anglo-Egyptian Sudan. Some Sudanese considered Abd al-Rahman to qualify as future King of Sudan, as the country gained independence, but he declined the title for spiritual reasons. 'Abd al-Rahman sponsored the Umma (Nation) political Party in the period before and just after Sudan became independent in 1956.

In modern-day Sudan, Muhammad Ahmad is sometimes considered to be a precursor of Sudanese nationalism. The Umma party claims to be his political descendants. Their former leader, Imam Sadiq al-Mahdi, was the great-great-grandson of Muhammad Ahmad, and also the imam of the Ansār, the religious order that pledges allegiance to Muhammad Ahmad. Sadiq al-Mahdi was a democratic leader and Prime Minister of Sudan on two occasions: first briefly in 1966–1967, and then between 1986 and 1989. Further, the Mahdi is an ancestor of Sudanese-English actor Alexander Siddig, whose birth name was Siddig El Tahir El Fadil El Siddig Abdurrahman Mohammed Ahmed Abdel Karim El Mahdi.

== Writings ==
The Complete Writings of the Mahdi of the Sudan, published in 1993, includes his written works (letters, proclamations, sermons, prayers, legal rulings), approximately 1,000 in total, produced between 1881 and 1885.

== In popular culture ==
- In the story Ibn el 'amm (1887) by German writer Karl May, the Mahdi explains the death of a praying person killed by a lion.
- Im Lande des Mahdi (The Mahdi Trilogy, 1896) by Karl May, where Kara Ben Nemsi meets Muhammad Ahmad.
- In Desert and Wilderness, a young adult novel by Henryk Sienkiewicz (1912)
- In the 1966 movie Khartoum, the Mahdi was played by Laurence Olivier.
- In the British sitcom Dad's Army, Lance-Corporal Jones often talks about his encounters with the Mahdi.
- In the 1999 film Topsy-Turvy, characters discuss the news of the Mahdi's destruction of the British garrison at Khartoum.
- The Four Feathers, a much-filmed adventure novel from 1902 is set during the British military expedition against the Mahdi.
- A 2007 episode of the crime drama Waking the Dead featured an attempt to locate the Mahdi's missing skull, in order to defuse tensions due to the hunger strike of a Sudanese Mahdist politician. The episode also made reference to the 1966 film in particular reference to Olivier's portrayal of the Mahdi.
- The 2008 novel After Omdurman by John Ferry deals with the reconquest of the Sudan and the destruction of the army of the Mahdi's successor, the Khalifa.
- "Winston's Lost Night", a 2013 episode of Murdoch Mysteries, involves the murder of a man for desecrating the Mahdi's tomb. The young Winston Churchill is initially suspected of the murder. He gives a speech denouncing the desecration.
- Wilbur Smith's novel The Triumph of the Sun is set around the siege of Khartoum led by the Mahdi.

== See also ==
- History of Mahdist Sudan
- In Desert and Wilderness (novel)
- Millenarianism in colonial societies
- List of Mahdi claimants
- Rabih az-Zubayr
- Reginald Wingate
- Ahmad Zayni Dahlan
- Ibn Tumart
