= Aba Island =

White Nile island south of Khartoum, Sudan

Aba
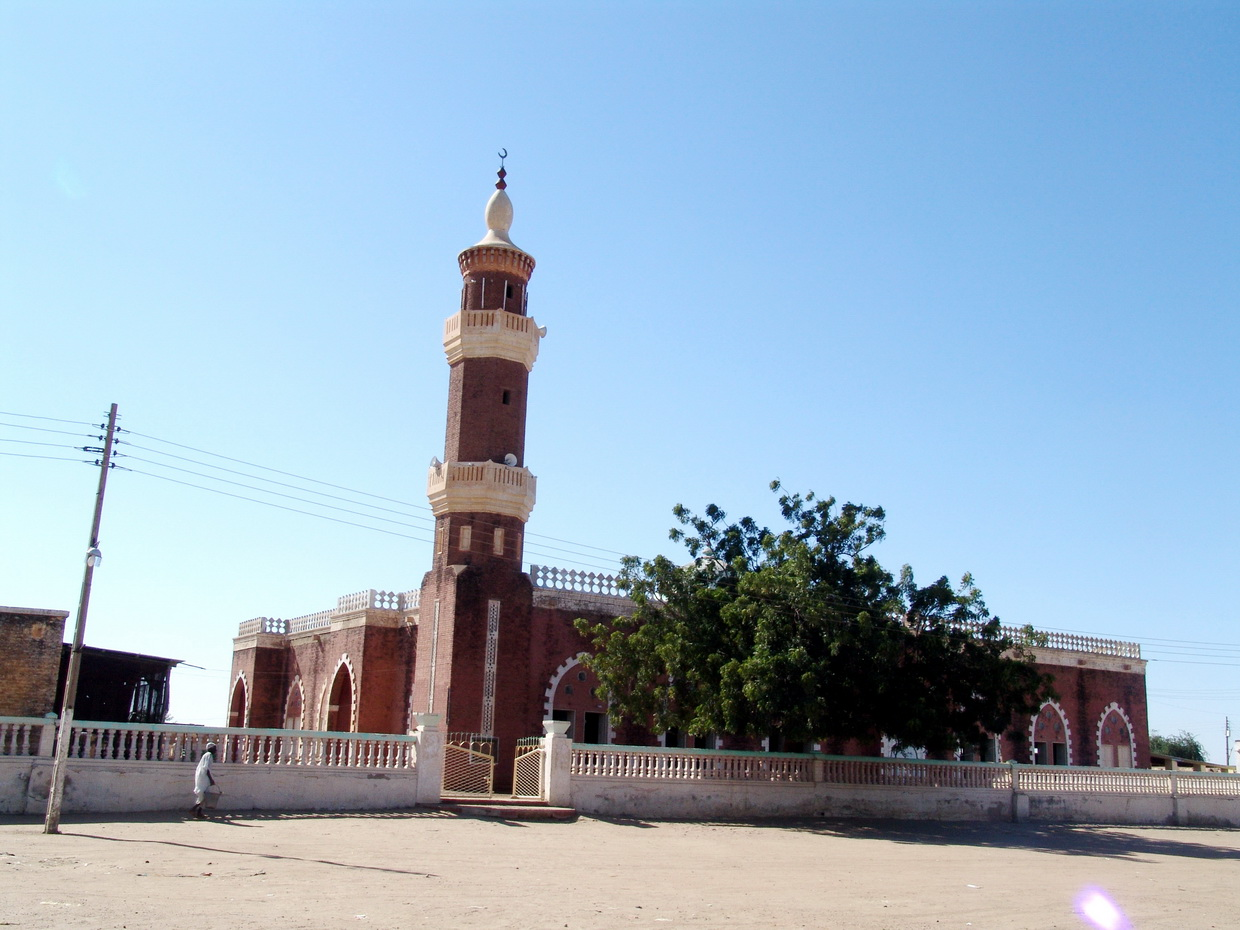
- The Old Mosque of Aba Island

Geography
- Location
- Coordinates: 13°20′N 32°37′E

Administration
- Sudan

Aba Island is an island on the White Nile to the south of Khartoum, Sudan. It is the original home of the Mahdi in Sudan and the spiritual base of the Umma Party.

== History ==
Aba Island was the birthplace of the Mahdiyya, first declared on June 29, 1881 as a religious movement by Muhammad Ahmad, the self-proclaimed Mahdi.

The island was the site of the first battle of the Mahdist War on August 12, 1881.

In the early 1920s, between 5,000 and 15,000 pilgrims were coming to Aba Island each year to celebrate Ramadan. Many of them identified 'Abd al-Rahman with the Islamic prophet Isa (Jesus) and assumed that he would drive the Christian colonists out of Sudan.

The British found that the Abd al-Rahman al-Mahdi was in correspondence with agents and leaders in Nigeria and Cameroon, predicting the eventual victory of the Mahdists over the Christians. They blamed him for unrest in these colonies. After pilgrims from West Africa held mass demonstrations on Aba Island in 1924, Abd al-Rahman al-Mahdi was told to put a stop to the pilgrimages.

=== Airstrike (1970) ===
Responding to a 1970 Ansar protest against his newly established government in Khartoum, Gaafar Nimeiry attacked the island in March-April 1970 with the help of Egyptian Air Force fighter-bombers, allegedly directed by Hosni Mubarak who was then a young air force chief. About 12,000 Ansar were killed in the assault including the uncle of Sadiq al-Mahdi and the extensive holdings and property of the Mahdi family were sequestered by the state.

== Sources ==
- Warburg, Gabriel (2003). "Sayyid 'Abd al-Rahman al-Mahdi, 1885 - 1959". Islam, sectarianism, and politics in Sudan since the Mahdiyya. Univ of Wisconsin Press. pp. 125–127. ISBN 0-299-18294-0.
