= Politics of Sudan =

Republic of the Sudan جمهورية السودان (Arabic) Jumhūriyyat Asūdān
- Emblem of Sudan
- Polity type: Federal provisional republic
- Constitution: 2019 Draft Constitutional Declaration

Legislative branch
- Name: Transitional Legislative Authority
- Type: Unicameral
- Meeting place: Omdurman

Executive branch
- Head of state
- Title: Presidency
- Currently: Transitional Sovereignty Council
- Appointer: Commander-in-Chief of the Armed Forces
- Head of government
- Title: Prime Minister
- Currently: Kamil Idris
- Appointer: Transitional Sovereignty Council

The politics of Sudan takes place in the context of a civil war between two factions of the country's military dictatorship. Sudan has usually been ruled by the military, interspersed with short periods of democratic parliamentary rule.

Formally, the politics of Sudan takes place in a framework of a federal provisional government. Previously, a president was head of state, head of government, and commander-in-chief of the Sudanese Armed Forces in a de jure multi-party system. Legislative power was officially vested in both the government and in the two chambers, the National Assembly (lower house) and the Council of States (upper house), of the bicameral National Legislature. The judiciary is independent and obtained by the Constitutional Court.

Following a deadly civil war and the still ongoing genocide in Darfur, Sudan was widely recognized as a totalitarian state where all effective political power was held by President Omar al-Bashir and his National Congress Party (NCP). However, al-Bashir and the NCP were ousted in a military coup which occurred on 11 April 2019. The government of Sudan was then led by the Transitional Military Council or TMC. On 20 August 2019, the TMC dissolved giving its authority over to the Transitional Sovereignty Council, who were planned to govern for 39 months until 2022, in the process of transitioning to democracy. However, the Sovereignty Council and the Sudanese government were dissolved on 25 October 2021. On 11 November 2021, the Sovereignty Council was restored with new membership.

== History ==
The political system of Sudan was rigorously restructured following a military coup on 30 June 1989, when Omar al-Bashir, then a brigadier in the Sudanese Army, led a group of officers and ousted the government of Prime Minister Sadiq al-Mahdi. Under al-Bashir's leadership, the new military government suspended political parties and introduced an Islamic legal code on the national level. He then became Chairman of the Revolutionary Command Council for National Salvation (RCCNS-Sudan), a newly established body with legislative and executive powers for what was described as a transitional period, and assumed the posts of chief of state, prime minister, chief of the armed forces, and minister of defense. Further on, after institutionalizing Sharia law in the northern part of the country along with Hassan al-Turabi, al-Bashir issued purges and executions in the upper ranks of the army, the banning of associations, political parties, and independent newspapers and the imprisonment of leading political figures and journalists. In 1993, Sudan transformed into an Islamic totalitarian one-party state as al-Bashir abolished the Revolutionary Command Council and created the National Islamic Front (NIF) with a new parliament and government obtained solely by members of the NIF, and proclaimed himself President of Sudan. As a result, the Second Sudanese Civil War with the Sudan People's Liberation Army (SPLA) would only escalate in the following years.

From 1983 to 1997, the country was divided into five regions in the north and three in the south, each headed by a military governor. After the military coup in 1989, regional assemblies were suspended. With the Revolutionary Command Council for National Salvation abolished in 1993 and the ruling National Islamic Front (NIF) forming the National Congress Party (NCP), the new party included some non-Muslim members, mainly Southern Sudanese politicians, some of whom were appointed as ministers or state governors.

In 1997, the structure of regional administration was replaced by the creation of twenty-six states. The executives, cabinets, and senior-level state officials are appointed by the president, and their limited budgets are determined by and dispensed from Khartoum. The states, as a result, remain economically dependent upon the central government. Khartoum state, comprising the capital and outlying districts, is administered by a governor.

Following the signing of the Comprehensive Peace Agreement (CPA) in 2005 between the government of Omar al-Bashir and the Sudan People's Liberation Movement/Army (SPLM/A), a Government of National Unity was installed in Sudan in accordance with the Interim Constitution whereby a co-Vice President position representing the south was created in addition to the northern Sudanese vice president. This allowed the north and south to split oil deposits equally, but also left both the north's and south's armies in place.

Following the Darfur Peace Agreement, the office of senior presidential advisor, the fourth highest constitutional post, was allocated to Minni Minnawi, a Zaghawa of the Darfur-based Sudanese Liberation Army (SLA). Executive posts were divided between the National Congress Party (NCP), the Sudan People's Liberation Movement/Army (SPLM/A), Eastern Front and factions of the Umma Party and Democratic Unionist Party (DUP). This peace agreement with the SPLM/A granted Southern Sudan autonomy for six years, to be followed by a referendum about independence in 2011. According to the new 2005 constitution, the bicameral National Legislature is the official Sudanese parliament, and is divided between two chambers; the National Assembly, a lower house with 426 seats, and the Council of States, an upper house with 32 seats. Thus the parliament consists of 500 appointed members altogether, where all are indirectly elected by state legislatures to serve six-year terms.

Despite his international arrest warrant, Omar al-Bashir was re-elected in the 2010 Sudanese presidential election, the first democratic election with multiple political parties participating in nine years. His political rival was Vice President Salva Kiir, current leader of the SPLA.

In December 1999, a power struggle climaxed between President Omar al-Bashir and Hassan al-Turabi, NIF founder, Islamist ideologue and speaker of parliament. Al-Turabi was stripped of his posts in the ruling party and the government, parliament was disbanded, the constitution suspended, and a state of national emergency declared by presidential decree. Parliament resumed in February 2001 after the December 2000 presidential and parliamentary elections, but the national emergency laws remain in effect. Around the same time the Black Book, a manuscript by dissident Westerners detailing the domination of the northern peoples, was published. Al-Turabi was arrested in February 2001, and charged with being a threat to national security and the constitutional order for signing a memorandum of understanding with the SPLM/A. He was placed in a maximum-security prison until freed in 2005.

As part of the agreement ending the Second Sudanese Civil War, nine members of the SPLM/A and 16 members of the government were sworn in as Ministers on 22 September 2005, forming the first post war government of national unity. The inauguration was delayed over arguments over who would get various portfolios and as a result of the death of Vice President John Garang. The National Congress Party kept control of the key energy, defense, interior and finance posts, while an SPLM appointee became foreign minister. Vice President Salva Kiir was reported to have backed down in the argument over who would have control of the vital Ministry of Energy and Mining, which handles the output of Sudan's oil fields.

On April 11, 2019, al-Bashir and his government were overthrown in a military coup led by his first vice president and defense minister, who then established the now ruling military junta. The next day Auf handed power to Lt. General Abdel Fattah Abdelrahman Burhan.

Sudan’s Sovereign Council, the military-civilian body that is the highest power in the transitional government, has ruled Sudan since the fall of Omar al-Bashir. Prime Minister Abdalla Hamdok is the civilian leader of the cabinet.

In October 2020, Sudan made an agreement to normalize diplomatic relations with Israel, as part of the agreement the United States removed Sudan from the U.S. list of State Sponsors of Terrorism.

As of August 2021, the country was jointly led by the chairman of the Sovereignty Council, Abdel Fattah al-Burhan, and Prime Minister Abdallah Hamdok.

On 25 October 2021, the Sovereignty Council and the Sudanese government were immensely dissolved after being overthrown in the 2021 Sudan coup. On 11 November 2021, Chairman Abdel Fattah al-Burhan re-formed the Sovereignty Council with new membership.

== See also ==
- Corruption in Sudan
- Human rights in Sudan
- Sudanese peace process
- 2011–13 protests in Sudan
- 2019 Sudanese transition to democracy
- Sudanese Sovereignty Council (disambiguation)
- Sudanese coup d'état
