= Ali Ahmed Karti =

Sudanese politician (born 1953)

- علي أحمد كرتي
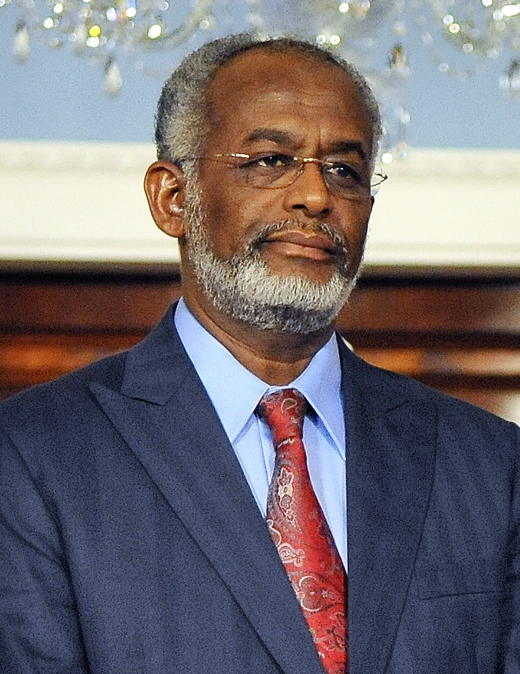
- Ali Ahmed Karti in 2011

Minister of Foreign Affairs
- In office 2010 – 7 June 2015
- President: Omar al-Bashir
- Preceded by: Deng Alor Kuol
- Succeeded by: Ibrahim Ghandour

State Minister of Foreign Affairs
- In office 2005–2010

State Minister of Justice
- In office 2001–2005

Member of the National Assembly of Sudan
- In office 2000–2005
- Constituency: South Shandi, River Nile State

Personal details
- Born: Ali Ahmed Karti; 11 March 1953 (age 73) or 27 October 1953 (age 73) Hajar Alasal, Anglo-Egyptian Sudan
- Party: National Congress Party
- Education: University of Khartoum
- Occupation: Politician, lawyer, businessman

Ali Ahmed Karti (Arabic: علي أحمد كرتي; born 11 March or 27 October 1953) is a Sudanese politician and businessman. Karti served as Minister of Foreign Affairs of Sudan from 2010 to 2015. As of June 2021 he is the secretary general of the Sudanese Islamic Movement.

He previously served as State Minister of Foreign Affairs (2005–2010) and Justice (2001–2005) and was member of the National Assembly of Sudan from 2000 to 2005.

== Early life and career ==
Karti was born on 11 March or 27 October 1953 in Hajar Alasal, River Nile State. He studied law at the University of Khartoum and obtained his degree in 1979. Between 1979 and 1998 he worked as a consultant and lawyer. At one point Karti attended training camps in Libya. He was an erstwhile loyal supporter of Hassan al-Turabi. In 1998 however he was a signatory of a memorandum against al-Turabi together with Ghazi Salah al-Din al-Atabani.

During the 1990s he was one of the founders of the Popular Defence Forces (PDF) and from 1998 to 2000 he was its general coordinator (munassiq). He also served as its commander. He oversaw the group during the Second Sudanese Civil War. In leaked information from the United States Department of State on WikiLeaks Karti was also credited with organizing the Janjaweed which were active in the Darfur genocide. On 12 January 2001, PDF forces attacked facilities of the International Committee of the Red Cross in Chelkou, Southern Sudan.

== Political career ==
In the late 1990s Karti became one of the founding members of the National Congress Party.

During the 2000 Sudanese general election Karti was elected a member of the National Assembly of Sudan for South Shandi, River Nile State. He held this office until 2005. From 2001 until 2005 he was State Minister at the Ministry of Justice. In this period he flew to Darfur to buy the support of Arab tribal leaders with money supplied by Salah Gosh. Subsequently he was State Minister at the Ministry of Foreign Affairs from 2005 until 2010. In this period he was granted a visa to the United States to meet with Jendayi Frazer, the Assistant Secretary of State for African Affairs. He however did not show up to the meeting. During the 2010 Sudanese general election he was once more elected for South Shandi, but became Minister of Foreign Affairs. He succeeded Deng Alor Kuol.

In May 2011 he and vice president Ali Osman Taha declined to meet with a United Nations Security Council delegation that investigated the crisis in Abyei. In 2011 Karti met with Chinese diplomat Liu Guijin, who urged Sudan and South Sudan to work out their differences to keep oil transported between the two countries. In 2012 this was followed by visits from Chinese president Hu Jintao and vice president Xi Jinping. During his term in office Karti requested the United States to remove Sudan from its list of State Sponsors of Terrorism. He also tried to foster closer relations with African countries, opened an embassy in Rwanda and planned to open several others in different countries. He also stated he want to mediate between Ethiopia and Egypt regarding the Grand Ethiopian Renaissance Dam, not wanting to take sides.

In 2015 Sudanese president Omar al-Bashir formed a new government, and Karti was succeeded on 7 June by Ibrahim Ghandour.

=== Post 2019 Sudanese coup d'état ===
After the events of the 2019 Sudanese coup d'état, on 17 March 2020, the Sudanese prosecutor's office ordered his arrest for his role in the 1989 coup d'état which brought Omar al-Bashir to power. It said in a statement that his assets would be frozen.

After the death of al-Zubeir Mohamed al-Hassan, Kharti became secretary general of the Sudanese Islamic Movement in June 2021. He was elected in a secret meeting by its Shura council. Karti is alleged to have supported the 2021 Sudanese coup d'état in October. Furthermore, Karti is considered a prominent figure in the Sudanese Islamic Movement, which comprises the U.S. sanctioned Sudanese Muslim Brotherhood.

=== Rejectionist Stance in Sudanese Peace Talks ===
Ali Ahmed Karti has consistently rejected international peace initiatives and ceasefire efforts throughout the Sudan conflict. U.S. officials sanctioned Karti in 2023 for actively obstructing negotiations aimed at reaching a ceasefire, while he publicly denounced Quad-led mediation efforts as “blatant interference” in Sudan’s internal affairs. His alignment with hardline Islamist factions and support for Burhan’s refusal to negotiate with the RSF have made Karti widely associated with an uncompromising and rejectionist approach to the war.

== International sanctions ==
In September 2023, the United States imposed sanctions on Karti, accusing him of undermining the transition to a civil administration in Sudan since 2019. It also accused him undermining peace efforts between the Sudanese Armed Forces and the Rapid Support Forces in the War in Sudan. Both the disbanded National Congress Party and the Sudanese Islamic Movement challenged the sanctions, and claimed pride could be derived from them.

In April 2024 Canada also imposed sanctions on Karti. On 24 June 2024, the EU Council imposed personal sanctions on Karti for his continuous efforts to obstruct peace process between the SAF and the RSF as well as derailing Sudan's transition to civilian-led democracy.

== Business career ==
Karti is a prominent Sudanese businessman, and bought the Friendship Hotel in Khartoum for $85 million at one point. As of July 2023 he was seen as one of the richest people in Sudan.

== Personal life ==
Karti is Muslim. He is married and has one or more children.

Preceded by Deng Alor Kuol	Minister of Foreign Affairs; 2010–2015	Succeeded by Ibrahim Ghandour
