= Republic of the Sudan (1985–2019) =

Government of Sudan from 1985 to 2019

Republic of the Sudan جمهورية السودان (Arabic) Jumhūriyyat as-Sūdān
- 1985–2019
- Flag Emblem
- Motto: النصر لنا an-Naṣr lanā "Victory is ours"
- Anthem: نحن جند الله، جند الوطن; Naḥnu Jund Allah, Jund Al-waṭan "We are Soldiers of God, Soldiers of the Homeland"
- Map of Sudan before South Sudanese independence on 9 July 2011
- Capital and largest city: Khartoum; 15°36′N 32°30′E
- Official languages: Arabic; English
- Ethnic groups: 70% Sudanese Arabs; 5.5% Beja; 2.5% Nuba; 2% Fur; 1.2% Egyptian; 0.5% Fulani; 18.3% other
- Religion: Islam
- Demonym: Sudanese
- Government: Transitional Military Council (1985–1986); Parliamentary republic (1986–1989); Islamic republic under a dictatorship (1989–2019)
- President
  - 1985–1986: Abdel Rahman Swar al-Dahab
  - 1986–1989: Ahmed al-Mirghani
  - 1989–2019: Omar al-Bashir
- Prime Minister
  - 1985–1986: Al-Jazuli Daf'allah
  - 1986–1989: Sadiq al-Mahdi
  - 1989–2017: Post abolished
  - 2017–2018: Bakri Hassan Saleh
  - 2018–2019: Motazz Moussa
  - 2019: Mohamed Tahir Ayala
- Legislature: National Legislature
  - Upper house: Council of States
  - Lower house: National Assembly
- Historical era: Cold War, Arab Cold War, war on terror
  - Establishment: 6 April 1985
  - Parliamentary election: 1–12 April 1986
  - Omar al-Bashir seizes power: 30 June 1989
  - Coup d'état attempt failed: 23 April 1990
  - Constitutional referendum: 27 May 1998
  - Comprehensive Peace Agreement: 9 January 2005
  - South Sudanese independence referendum: 9–15 January 2011
  - General election: 13–16 April 2015
  - Sudanese revolution: 2018–2019
  - End of Islamist rule: 11 April 2019

Area
- 1985: 2,530,397 km^{2} (976,992 sq mi)
- 2011: 1,886,068 km^{2} (728,215 sq mi)

Population
  - 1985: 19,905,871
  - 2011: 36,140,806
- GDP (PPP): 2019 estimate
  - Total: $51.31 billion
  - Per capita: $1,126
- GDP (nominal): 2019 estimate
  - Total: $32.34 billion
  - Per capita: $710
- Gini (2019): 55 high inequality
- HDI (2019): 0.521 low
- Currency: Sudanese pound (to 1992); Sudanese dinar (1992–2007); Sudanese pound (from 2007)
- Time zone: UTC+2 (CAT)
- Calling code: +249
- ISO 3166 code: SD
- Internet TLD: .sd; .السودان
Preceded by	Succeeded by
Democratic Republic of the Sudan	Republic of the Sudan; Republic of South Sudan
- Today part of: Sudan; South Sudan

On 6 April 1985, Defence Minister Abdel Rahman Swar al-Dahab seized power from President Gaafar Nimeiry in a coup d'état. Not long after, on 30 June 1989, Lieutenant General Omar al-Bashir, with instigation and support from the National Islamic Front (NIF), overthrew the short lived government in a coup d'état where he ruled as president with the National Congress Party (NCP) until his fall on 11 April 2019. During Bashir's rule, also referred to as Bashirist Sudan, or as they called themselves the al-Ingaz (Arabic for "salvation") regime, he was re-elected three times while overseeing the independence of South Sudan in 2011. His regime was criticized for human rights abuses, atrocities and genocide in Darfur and allegations of harboring and supporting terrorist groups (most notably during the residency of Osama bin Laden from 1992 to 1996) in the region while being subjected to United Nations sanctions beginning in 1995, resulting in Sudan's isolation as an international pariah.

== History ==
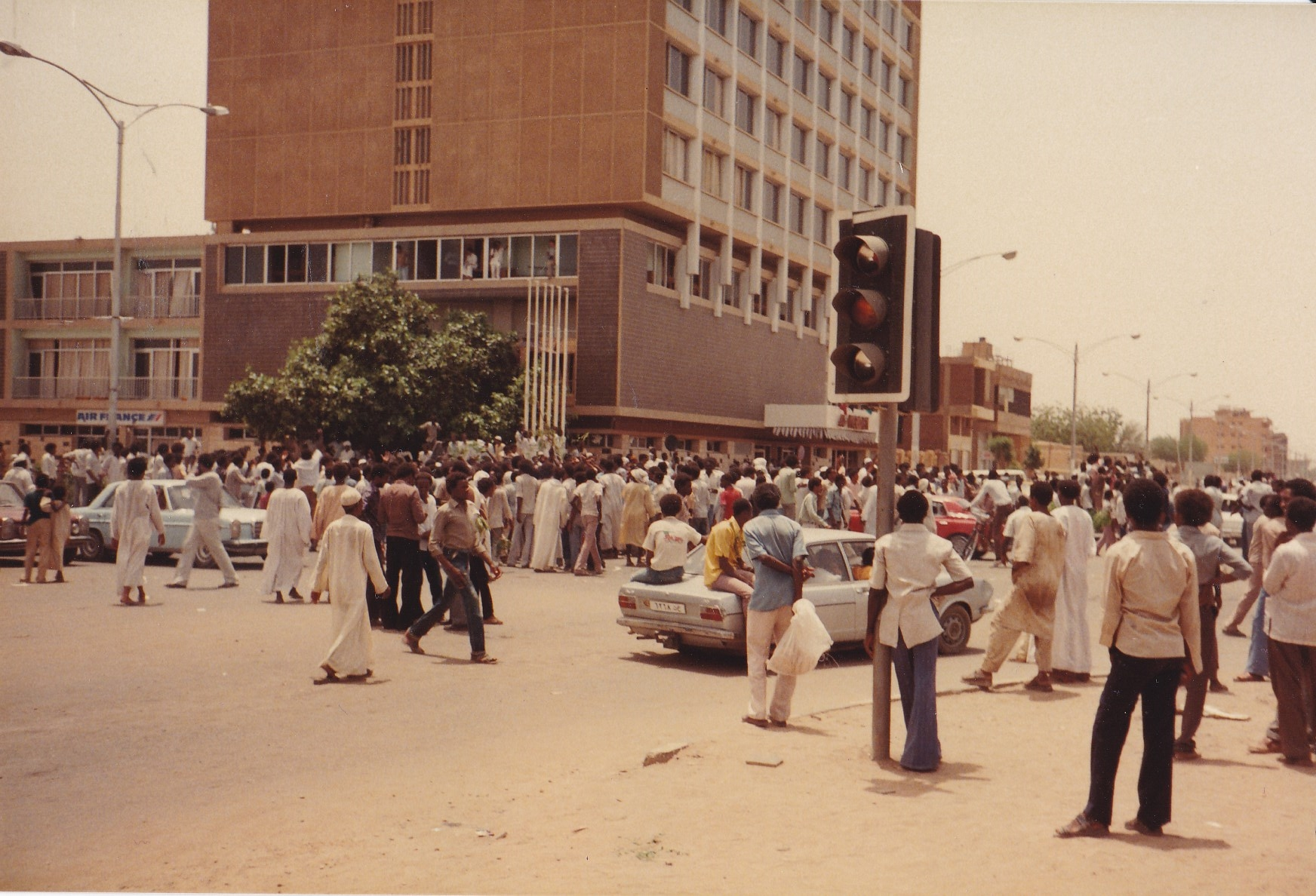
Celebrations outside the Meridian Hotel in central Khartoum.

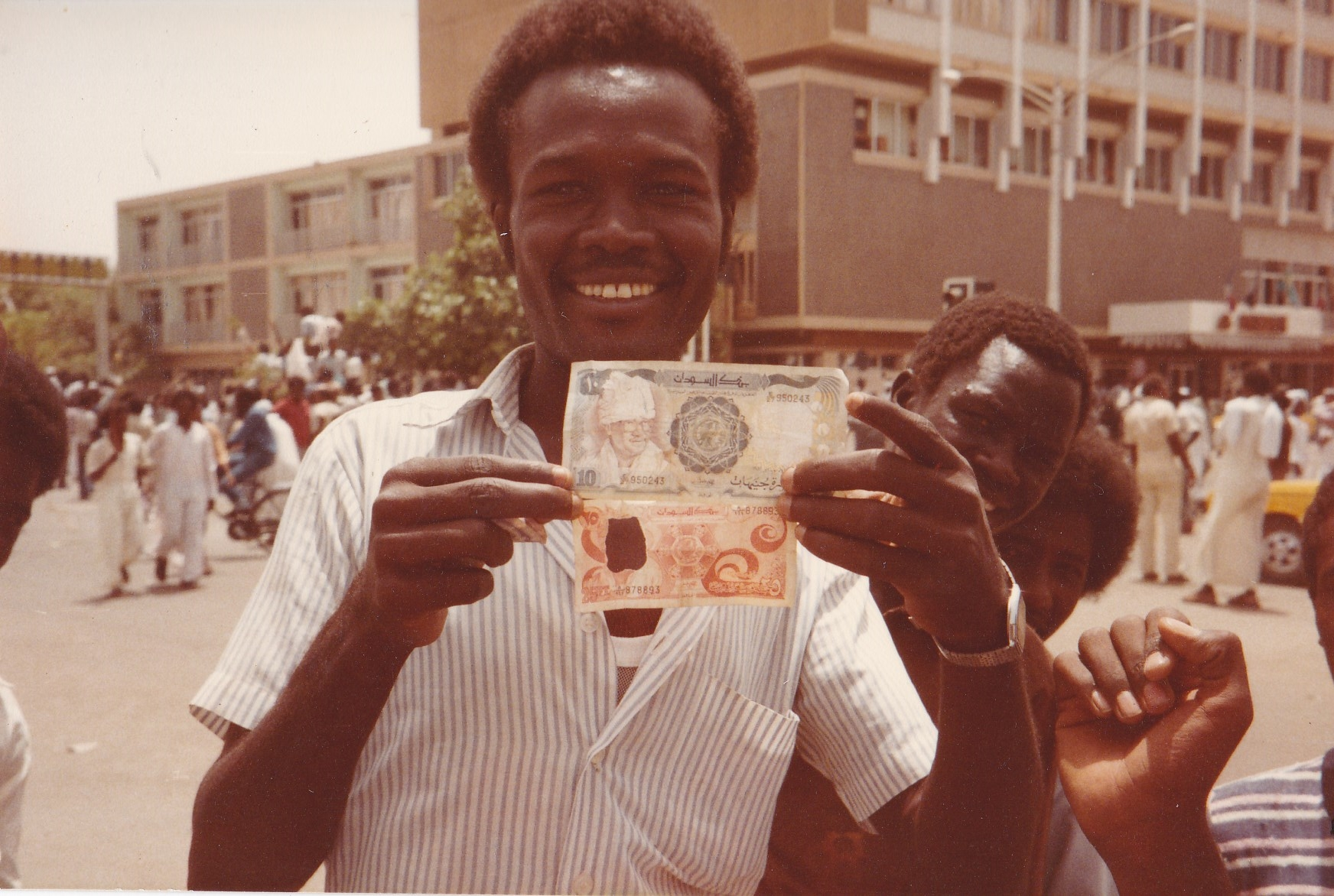
Numeri's face removed from a 25pt note.

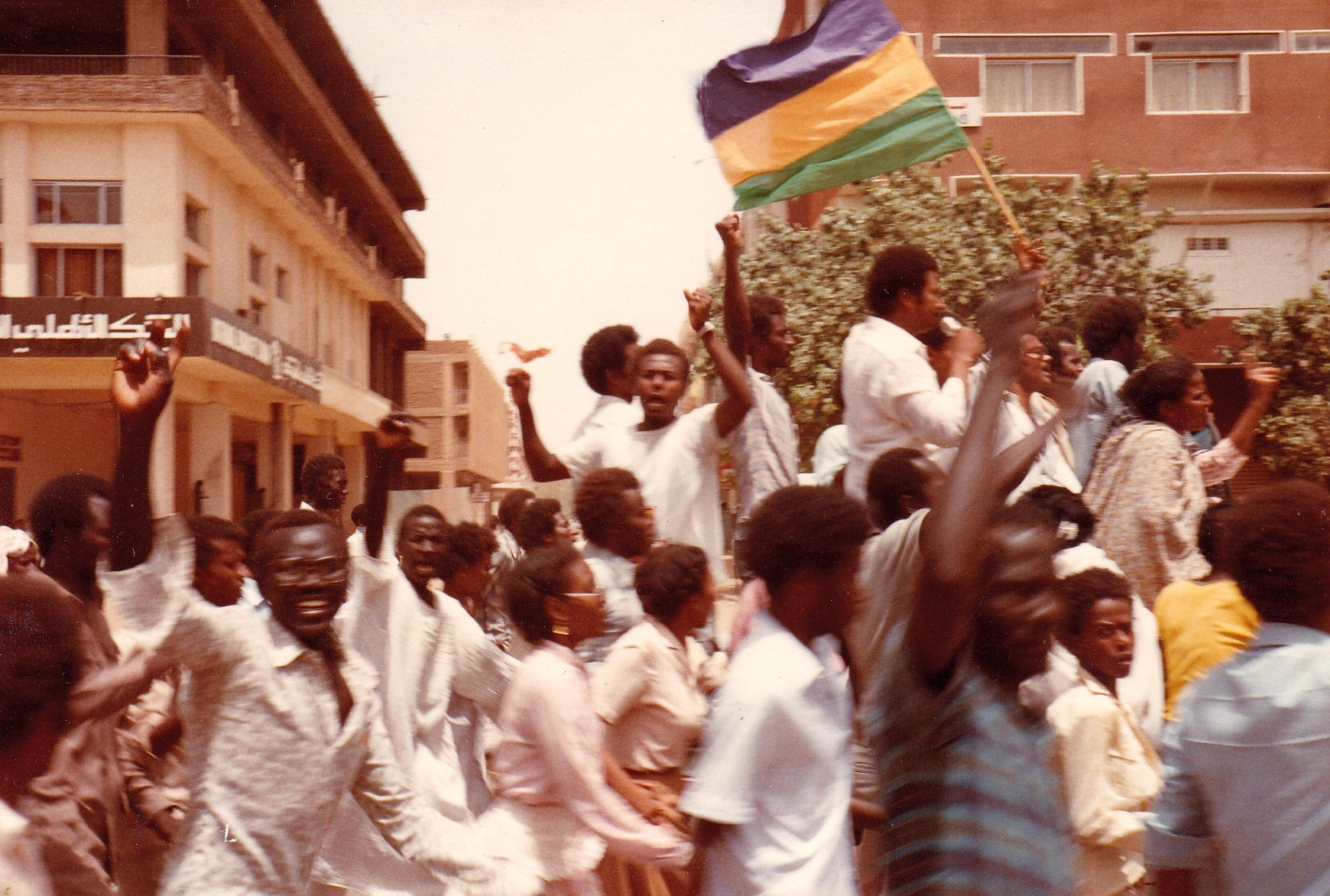
Celebrations featuring the pre-Numeri (1969) national flag of Sudan.

=== Al Mahdi government ===
In June 1986, Sadiq al-Mahdi formed a coalition government with the National Umma Party (NUP), the Democratic Unionist Party (DUP), the National Islamic Front (NIF), and four southern parties. Party factionalism, corruption, personal rivalries, scandals, and political instability characterized the Sadiq regime. After less than a year in office, Sadiq dismissed the government because it had failed to draft a new penal code to replace Sharia law, reach an agreement with the IMF, end the civil war in the south, or devise a scheme to attract remittances from Sudanese expatriates. To retain the support of the DUP and the southern political parties, Sadiq formed another ineffective coalition government.

Instead of removing the ministers who had been associated with the failures of the first coalition government, Sadiq retained thirteen of them, of whom eleven kept their previous portfolios. As a result, many Sudanese rejected the second coalition government as being a replica of the first. To make matters worse, Sadiq and DUP leader Ahmed al-Mirghani signed an inadequate memorandum of understanding that fixed the new government's priorities as affirming the application of the Sharia to Muslims, consolidating the Islamic banking system, and changing the national flag and national emblem. Furthermore, the memorandum directed the government to remove former leader Nimeiry's name from all institutions and dismiss all officials appointed by Nimeiry to serve in international and regional organizations. As expected, anti-government elements criticized the memorandum for not mentioning the civil war, famine, or the country's disintegrating social and economic conditions.

In August 1987, the DUP brought down the government because Sadiq opposed the appointment of a DUP member, Ahmad as Sayid, to the Supreme Commission. For the next nine months, Sadiq and al-Mirghani failed to agree on the composition of another coalition government. During this period, Sadiq moved closer to the NIF. However, the NIF refused to join a coalition government that included leftist elements. Moreover, Hassan al-Turabi, leader of the NIF indicated that the formation of a coalition government would depend on numerous factors, the most important of which were the resignation or dismissal of those serving in senior positions in the central and regional governments, the lifting of the state of emergency reimposed in July 1987, and the continuation of the Constituent Assembly.

Because of the endless debate over these issues, it was not until May 15, 1988, that a new coalition government emerged headed by Sadiq al Mahdi. Members of this coalition included the Umma, the DUP, the NIF, and some southern parties. As in the past, however, the coalition quickly disintegrated because of political bickering among its members. Major disagreements included the NIF's demand that it be given the post of commissioner of Khartoum, the inability to establish criteria for the selection of regional governors, and the NIF's opposition to the replacement of senior military officers and the chief of staff of the executive branch.

In August 1988, severe flooding occurred in Khartoum.

In November 1988, another more explosive political issue emerged when Mirghani and the Sudan People's Liberation Movement (SPLM) signed an agreement in Addis Ababa that included provisions for a cease-fire, the freezing of Sharia law, the lifting of the state of emergency, and the abolition of all foreign political and military pacts. The two sides also proposed to convene a constitutional conference to decide Sudan's political future. The NIF opposed this agreement because of its stand on Sharia. When the government refused to support the agreement, the DUP withdrew from the coalition. Shortly thereafter armed forces commander in chief Lieutenant General Fathi Ahmad Ali presented an ultimatum, signed by 150 senior military officers, to Sadiq al-Mahdi demanding that he make the coalition government more representative and that he announce terms for ending the civil war.

=== Fall of al-Mahdi and brief NIF regime ===
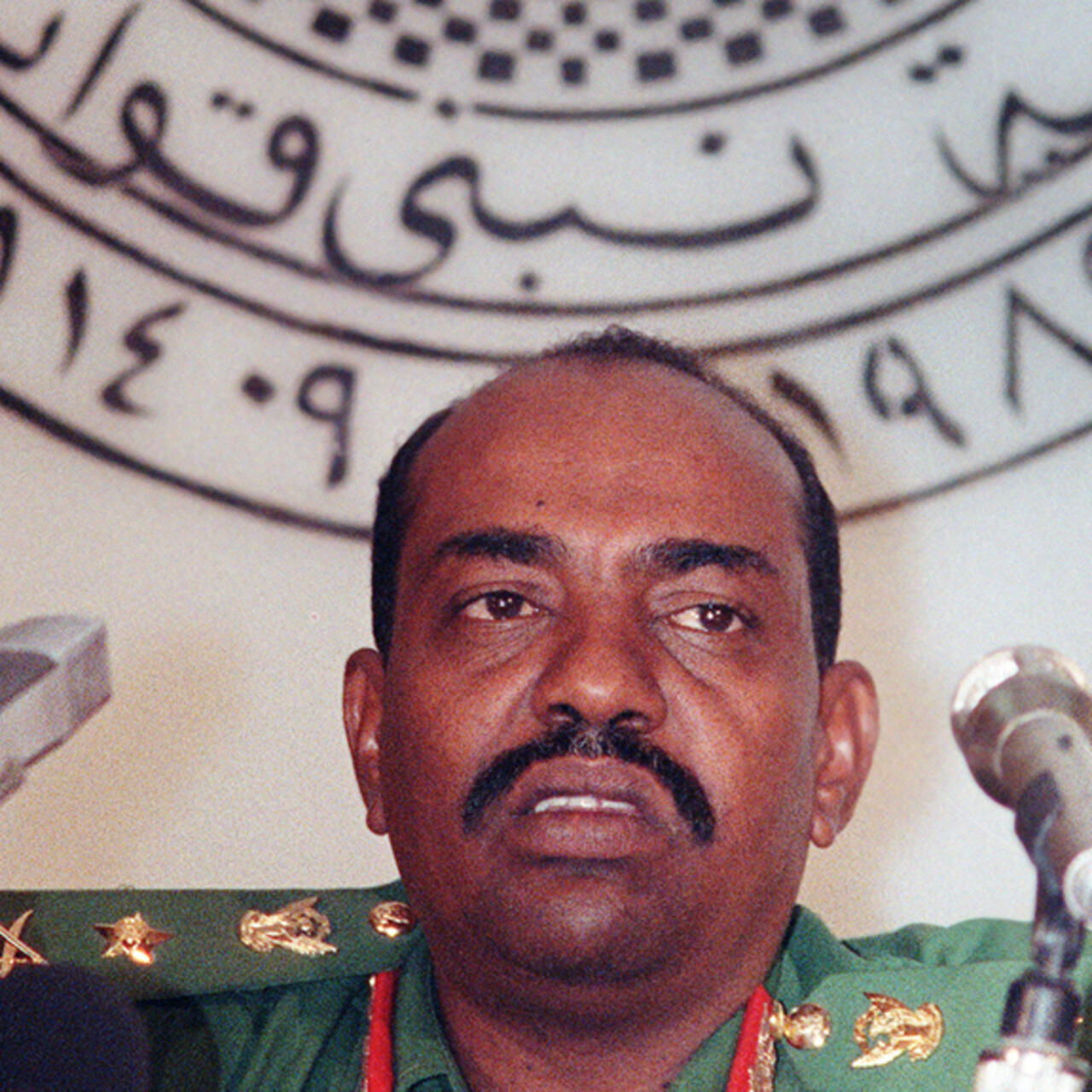
Omar al-Bashir in 1989

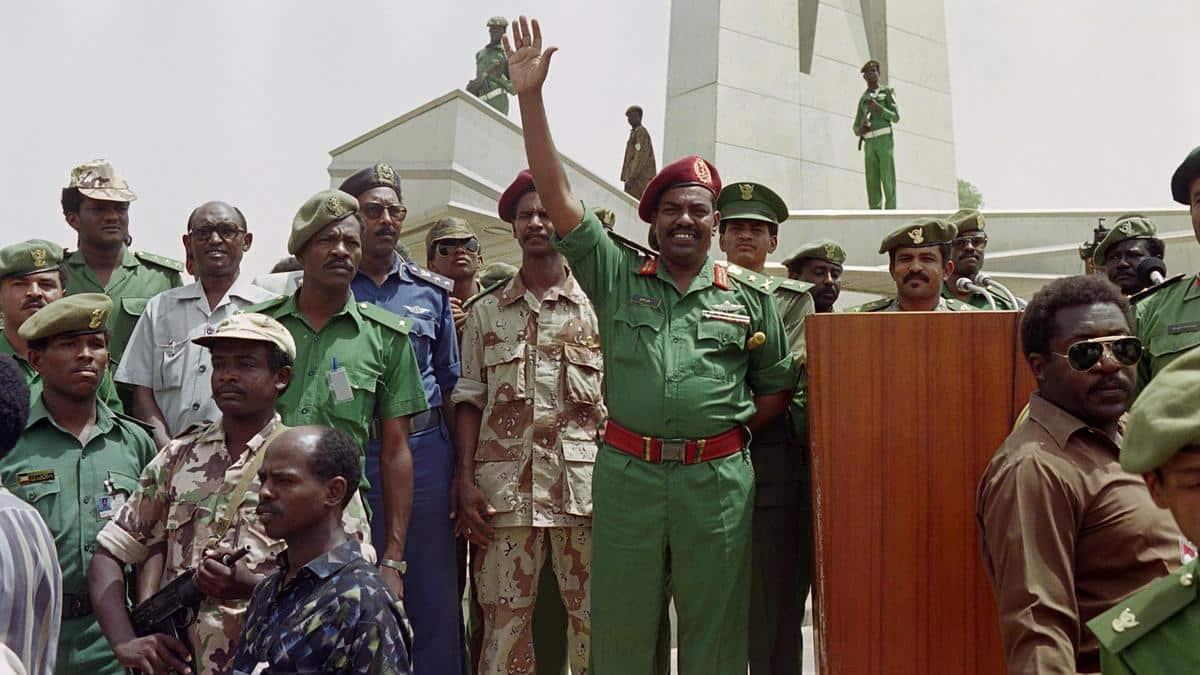
Omar al-Bashir (centre) and Abdel Rahim Mohammed Hussein (blue fatigue) in front of the Republican Palace after the coup

On March 11, 1989, Sadiq al-Mahdi responded to this pressure by dissolving the government. The new coalition had included the Umma, the DUP, and representatives of southern parties and the trade unions. The NIF refused to join the coalition because the coalition was not committed to enforcing Sharia law. Sadiq claimed his new government was committed to ending the southern civil war by implementing the November 1988 DUP-SPLM agreement. He also promised to mobilize government resources to bring food relief to famine areas, reduce the government's international debt, and build a national political consensus.

Sadiq's inability to live up to these promises eventually caused his downfall. On June 30, 1989, Colonel (later Lieutenant General) Umar Hassan Ahmad al-Bashir overthrew Sadiq and established the Revolutionary Command Council for National Salvation to rule Sudan. Bashir's commitment to imposing the Sharia on the non-Muslim south and to seeking a military victory over the Sudan People's Liberation Army (SPLA), however, seemed likely to keep the country divided for the foreseeable future and hamper resolution of the same problems faced by Sadiq al-Mahdi. Moreover, the emergence of the NIF as a political force made compromise with the south more unlikely.

The Revolutionary Command Council dissolved itself in October 1993. Its powers were devolved to the president (al-Bashir declared himself president) and the Transitional National Assembly.

The Popular Police Forces was created in 1989, they were estimated to have at least 35,000 members who technically were under the supervision of the director general of police, but it operated as a politicized militia that sought to enforce "moral standards" among the country's Islamic population. The PPF had a poor human-rights record. It was dissolved by the transitional government after the Sudanese Revolution.

=== Conflict in the south, Darfur conflict and conflict with Chad ===
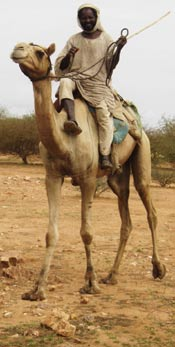
Series of droughts in Darfur led to disputes over land between non-Arab sedentary farmers and Arab Janjaweed nomads (see illustrative photo).

The civil war in the south had displaced more than 4 million southerners. Some fled into southern cities, such as Juba; others trekked as far north as Khartoum and even into Ethiopia, Kenya, Uganda, Egypt, and other neighboring countries. These people were unable to grow food or earn money to feed themselves, and malnutrition and starvation became widespread. The lack of investment in the south resulted in what international humanitarian organizations call a “lost generation” who lack educational opportunities, access to basic health care services, and little prospects for productive employment in the small and weak economies of the south or the north.

In early 2003 a new rebellion of the Sudan Liberation Movement/Army (SLM/A) and Justice and Equality Movement (JEM) groups in the western region of Darfur began. The rebels accused the central government of neglecting the Darfur region, although there is uncertainty regarding the objectives of the rebels and whether they merely seek an improved position for Darfur within Sudan or outright secession. Both the government and the rebels have been accused of atrocities in this war, although most of the blame has fallen on Arab militias (Janjaweed) allied with the government. The rebels have alleged that these militias have been engaging in ethnic cleansing in Darfur, and the fighting has displaced hundreds of thousands of people, many of them seeking refuge in neighboring Chad. There are various estimates on the number of human casualties, ranging from under twenty thousand to several hundred thousand dead, from either direct combat or starvation and disease inflicted by the conflict.

In 2004 Chad brokered negotiations in N'Djamena, leading to the April 8 Humanitarian Ceasefire Agreement between the Sudanese government, the JEM, and the SLA. However, the conflict continued despite the ceasefire, and the African Union (AU) formed a Ceasefire Commission (CFC) to monitor its observance. In August 2004, the African Union sent 150 Rwandan troops in, to protect the ceasefire monitors. It, however, soon became apparent that 150 troops would not be enough, so they were joined by 150 Nigerian troops.

On September 18, 2004 United Nations Security Council issued Resolution 1564 declaring that the government of Sudan had not met its commitments, expressing concern at helicopter attacks and assaults by the Janjaweed militia against villages in Darfur. It welcomed the intention of the African Union to enhance its monitoring mission in Darfur and urged all member states to support such efforts. During 2005 the African Union Mission in Sudan force was increased to about 7,000.

The Chadian-Sudanese conflict officially started on December 23, 2005, when the government of Chad declared a state of war with Sudan and called for the citizens of Chad to mobilize themselves against Rally for Democracy and Liberty (RDL) militants (Chadian rebels backed by the Sudanese government) and Sudanese militiamen who attacked villages and towns in eastern Chad, stealing cattle, murdering citizens, and burning houses.

Peace talks between the southern rebels and the government made substantial progress in 2003 and early 2004, although skirmishes in parts of the south have reportedly continued. The two sides have agreed that, following a final peace treaty, southern Sudan will enjoy autonomy for six years, and after the expiration of that period, the people of southern Sudan will be able to vote in a referendum on independence. Furthermore, oil revenues will be divided equally between the government and rebels during the six-year interim period. The ability or willingness of the government to fulfill these promises has been questioned by some observers, however, and the status of three central and eastern provinces was a point of contention in the negotiations. Some observers wondered whether hard line elements in the north would allow the treaty to proceed.

A final peace treaty was signed on 9 January 2005 in Naivasha. The terms of the peace treaty are as follows:

- The south will have autonomy for six years, followed by a referendum on secession.
- Both sides of the conflict will merge their armed forces into a 39,000-strong force after six years, if the secession referendum should turn out negative.
- Income from oilfields is to be shared evenly between north and south.
- Jobs are to be split according to varying ratios (central administration: 70 to 30, Abyei/Blue Nile State/Nuba Mountains: 55 to 45, both in favour of the government).
- Islamic law is to remain in the north, while continued use of the Sharia in the south is to be decided by the elected assembly.

On 31 August 2006, the United Nations Security Council approved Resolution 1706 to send a new peacekeeping force of 17,300 to Darfur. In the following months, however, UNMIS was not able to deploy to Darfur due to the Government of Sudan's steadfast opposition to a peacekeeping operation undertaken solely by the United Nations. The UN then embarked on an alternative, innovative approach to try to begin stabilize the region through the phased strengthening of AMIS, before transfer of authority to a joint African Union/United Nations peacekeeping operation. Following prolonged and intensive negotiations with the Government of Sudan and significant international pressure, the Government of Sudan finally accepted the peacekeeping operation in Darfur.

In 2009 the International Criminal Court issued an arrest warrant for al-Bashir, accusing him of crimes against humanity and war crimes.

In 2009 and 2010 a series of conflicts between rival nomadic tribes in South Kordofan caused a large number of casualties and displaced thousands.

An agreement for the restoration of harmony between Chad and Sudan, signed January 15, 2010, marked the end of a five-year war between them.

The Sudanese government and the JEM signed a ceasefire agreement ending the Darfur conflict in February, 2010.

=== Partition and rehabilitation ===
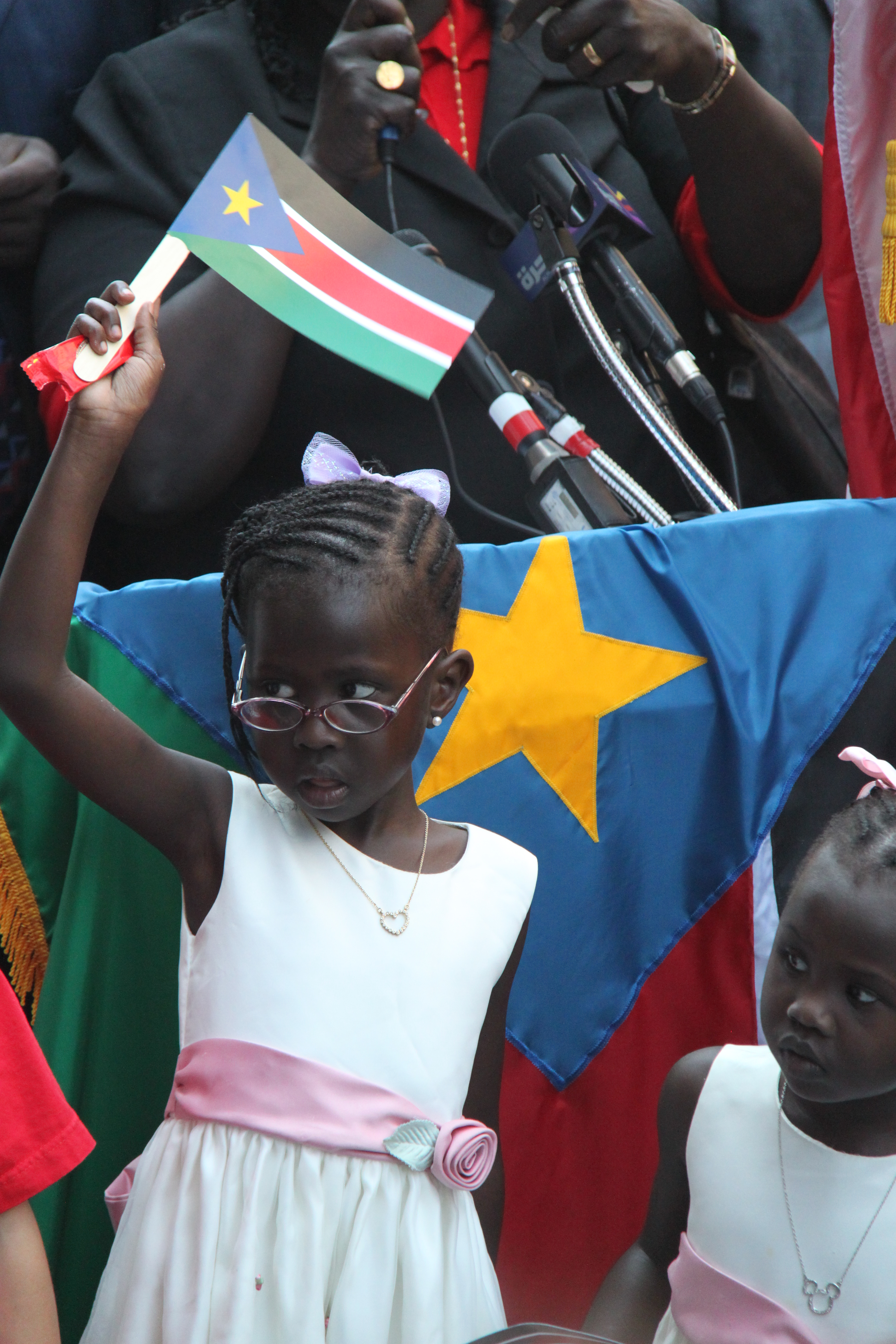
A South Sudanese girl at independence festivities

=== Protests ===
The Sudanese conflict in South Kordofan and Blue Nile in the early 2010s between the Army of Sudan and the Sudan Revolutionary Front started as a dispute over the oil-rich region of Abyei in the months leading up to South Sudanese independence in 2011, though it is also related to civil war in Darfur that is nominally resolved, in January 2011 a South Sudanese independence referendum was held, and the south voted overwhelmingly to secede later that year as the Republic of South Sudan, with its capital at Juba and Salva Kiir as its first president. Al-Bashir announced that he accepted the result, but violence soon erupted in the disputed region of Abyei, claimed by both the north and the south.

=== Re-elected ===
On 9 July 2011, South Sudan became an independent country. A year later in 2012 during the Heglig Crisis Sudan would achieve victory against South Sudan, a war over oil-rich regions between South Sudan's Unity and Sudan's South Kordofan states. The events would later be known as the Sudanese Intifada, which would end only in 2013 after al-Bashir promised he would not seek re-election in 2015. He later broke his promise and sought re-election in 2015, winning through a boycott from the opposition who believed that the elections would not be free and fair. Voter turnout was at a low 46%.

On 13 January 2017, US president Barack Obama signed an Executive Order that lifted many sanctions placed against Sudan and assets of its government held abroad. On 6 October 2017, the following US president Donald Trump lifted most of the remaining sanctions against the country and its petroleum, export-import, and property industries.

=== 2019 Sudanese Revolution and the fall of the Al Bashir regime ===
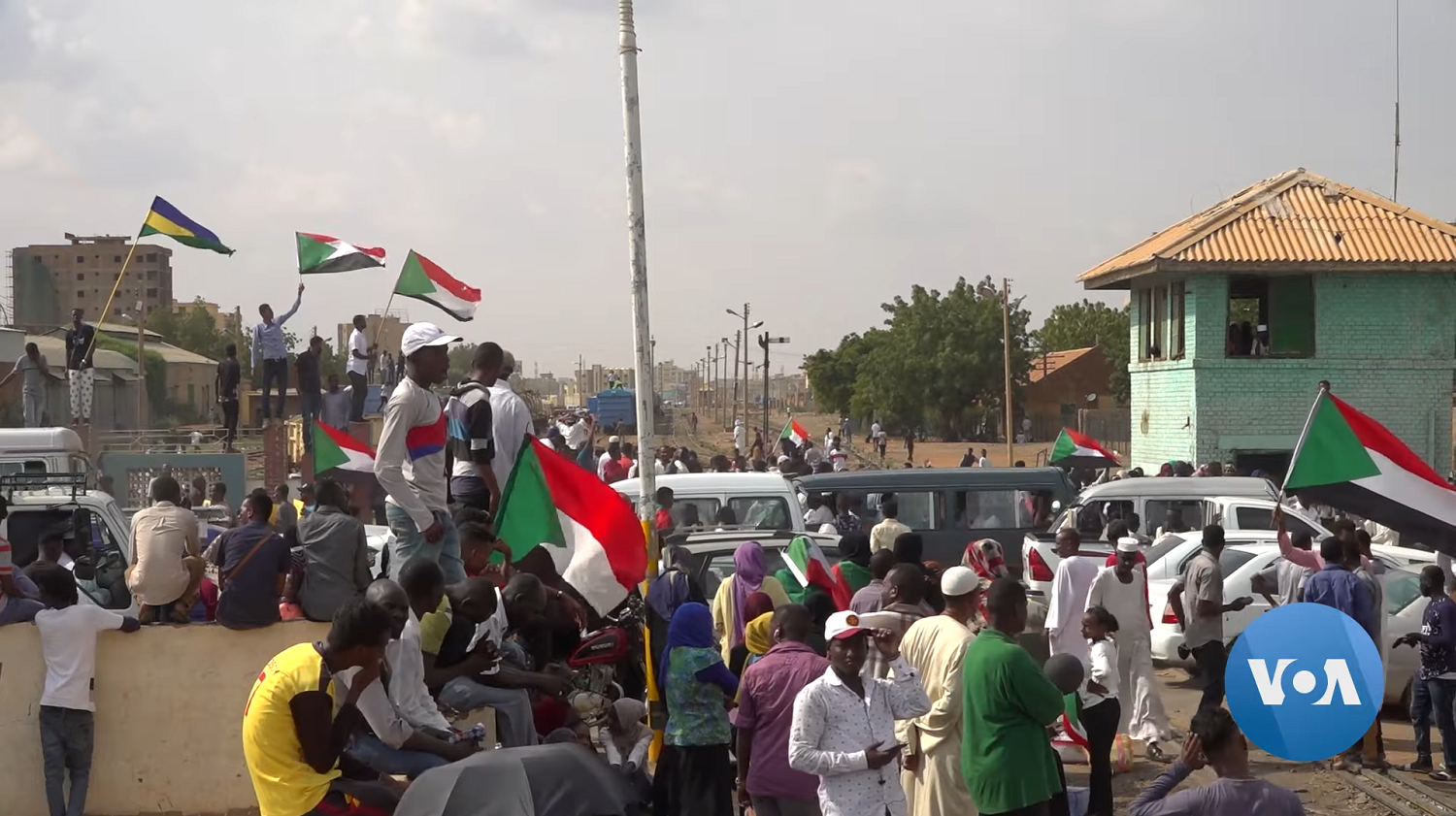
Sudanese protestors celebrate the 17 August 2019 signing of the Draft Constitutional Declaration between military and civilian representatives.

On 19 December 2018, massive protests began after a government decision to triple the price of goods at a time when the country was suffering an acute shortage of foreign currency and inflation of 70 percent. In addition, President al-Bashir, who had been in power for more than 30 years, refused to step down, resulting in the convergence of opposition groups to form a united coalition. The government retaliated by arresting more than 800 opposition figures and protesters, leading to the death of approximately 40 people according to the Human Rights Watch, although the number was much higher than that according to local and civilian reports. The protests continued after the overthrow of his government on 11 April 2019 after a massive sit-in in front of the Sudanese Armed Forces main headquarters, after which the chiefs of staff decided to intervene and they ordered the arrest of President al-Bashir and declared a three-month state of emergency. Over 100 people died on 3 June after security forces dispersed the sit-in using tear gas and live ammunition in what is known as the Khartoum massacre, resulting in Sudan's suspension from the African Union. Sudan's youth had been reported to be driving the protests. The protests came to an end when the Forces for Freedom and Change (an alliance of groups organizing the protests) and Transitional Military Council (the ruling military government) signed the July 2019 Political Agreement and the August 2019 Draft Constitutional Declaration. The transitional institutions and procedures included the creation of a joint military-civilian Sovereignty Council of Sudan as head of state, a new Chief Justice of Sudan as head of the judiciary branch of power, Nemat Abdullah Khair, and a new prime minister. The former Prime Minister, Abdalla Hamdok, a 61-year-old economist who worked previously for the UN Economic Commission for Africa, was sworn in on 21 August 2019. He initiated talks with the IMF and World Bank aimed at stabilising the economy, which was in dire straits because of shortages of food, fuel and hard currency. Hamdok estimated that US$10bn over two years would suffice to halt the panic, and said that over 70% of the 2018 budget had been spent on civil war-related measures. The governments of Saudi Arabia and the United Arab Emirates had invested significant sums supporting the military council since Bashir's ouster. On 3 September, Hamdok appointed 14 civilian ministers, including the first female foreign minister and the first Coptic Christian, also a woman. As of August 2021, the country was jointly led by Chairman of the Transitional Sovereign Council, Abdel Fattah al-Burhan, and Prime Minister Abdallah Hamdok.

== Government ==
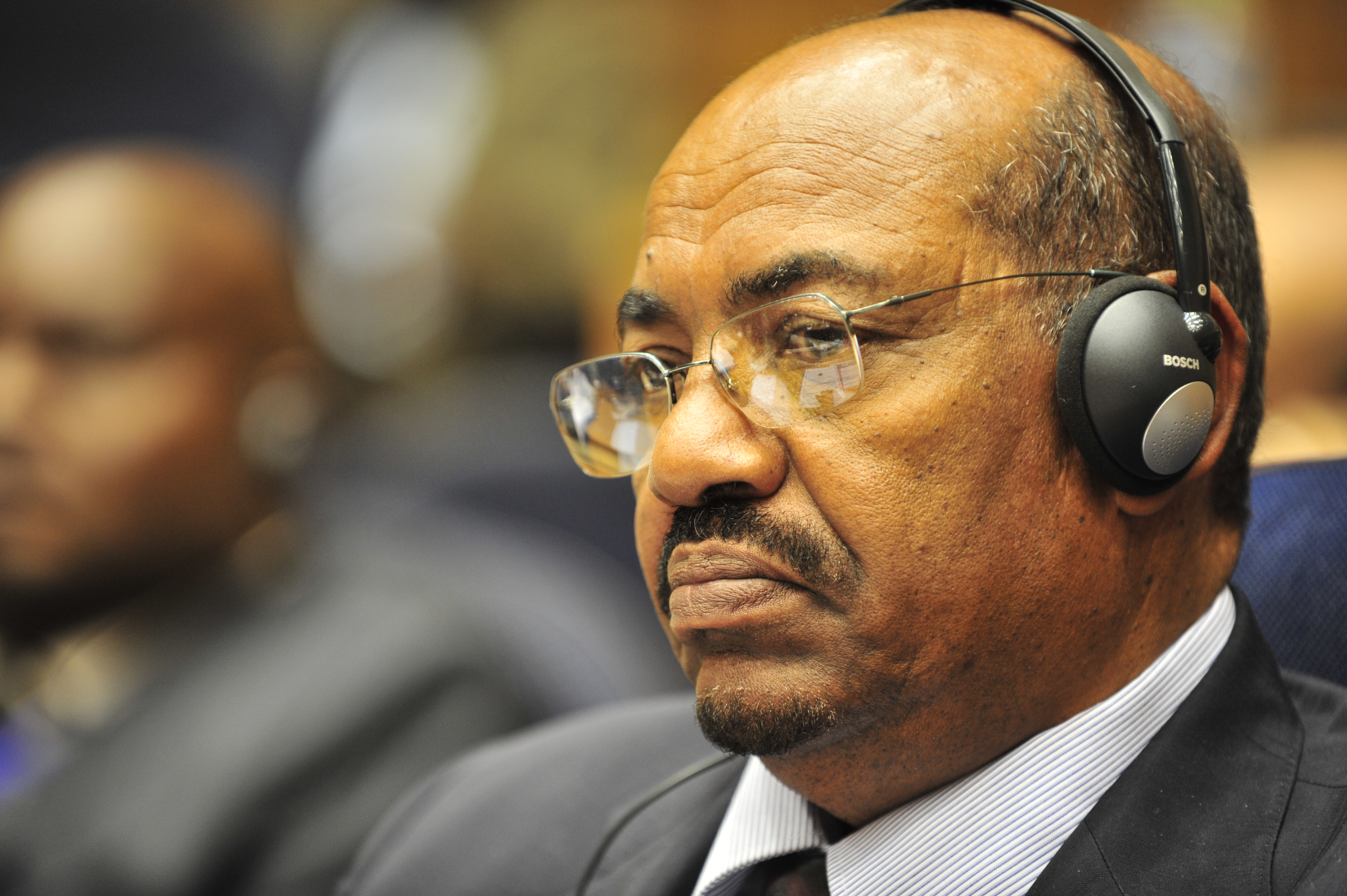
Sudanese President Omar al-Bashir

The president of Sudan was head of state, head of government, and commander-in-chief of the Sudanese Armed Forces in a de jure multi-party system. Legislative power was officially vested in both the government and in the two chambers, the National Assembly (lower house) and the Council of States (upper house), of the bicameral National Legislature. The judiciary is independent and obtained by the Constitutional Court. However, following a deadly civil war and the still ongoing genocide in Darfur, Sudan was widely recognized as a totalitarian state where all effective political power was held by President Omar al-Bashir and his National Congress Party (NCP).

=== Sharia law ===
During the regime of Omar al-Bashir, the legal system in Sudan was based on Islamic Sharia law. The 2005 Naivasha Agreement, ending the civil war between north and south Sudan, established some protections for non-Muslims in Khartoum. Sudan's application of Sharia law is geographically inconsistent.

Stoning was a judicial punishment in Sudan. Between 2009 and 2012, several women were sentenced to death by stoning. Flogging was a legal punishment. Between 2009 and 2014, many people were sentenced to 40–100 lashes. In August 2014, several Sudanese men died in custody after being flogged. 53 Christians were flogged in 2001. Sudan's public order law allowed police officers to publicly whip women who were accused of public indecency.

Crucifixion was also a legal punishment. In 2002, 88 people were sentenced to death for crimes relating to murder, armed robbery, and participating in ethnic clashes. Amnesty International wrote that they could be executed by either hanging or crucifixion.

International Court of Justice jurisdiction is accepted, though with reservations. Under the terms of the Naivasha Agreement, Islamic law did not apply in South Sudan. Since the secession of South Sudan there was some uncertainty as to whether Sharia law would apply to the non-Muslim minorities present in Sudan, especially because of contradictory statements by al-Bashir on the matter.

The judicial branch of the Sudanese government consists of a Constitutional Court of nine justices, the National Supreme Court, the Court of Cassation, and other national courts; the National Judicial Service Commission provides overall management for the judiciary.

=== Human rights ===
Since 1983, a combination of civil war and famine has taken the lives of nearly two million people in Sudan. It is estimated that as many as 200,000 people had been taken into slavery during the Second Sudanese Civil War.

Muslims who convert to Christianity can face the death penalty for apostasy; see Persecution of Christians in Sudan and the death sentence against Mariam Yahia Ibrahim Ishag (who actually was raised as Christian). According to a 2013 UNICEF report, 88% of women in Sudan had undergone female genital mutilation. Sudan's Personal Status law on marriage has been criticised for restricting women's rights and allowing child marriage. Evidence suggests that support for female genital mutilation remains high, especially among rural and less well educated groups, although it has been declining in recent years. Homosexuality is illegal; as of July 2020 it was no longer a capital offence, with the highest punishment being life imprisonment.

A report published by Human Rights Watch in 2018 revealed that Sudan has made no meaningful attempts to provide accountability for past and current violations. The report documented human rights abuses against civilians in Darfur, southern Kordofan, and Blue Nile. During 2018, the National Intelligence and Security Service (NISS) used excessive force to disperse protests and detained dozens of activists and opposition members. Moreover, the Sudanese forces blocked United Nations-African Union Hybrid Operation and other international relief and aid agencies to access to displaced people and conflict-ridden areas in Darfur.

=== Press freedom ===
Under the government of Omar al-Bashir, Sudan's media outlets were given little freedom in their reporting. In 2014, Reporters Without Borders' freedom of the press rankings placed Sudan at 172th of 180 countries.

=== International organisations in Sudan ===
Several UN agents are operating in Sudan such as the World Food Programme (WFP); the Food and Agriculture Organization of the United Nations (FAO); the United Nations Development Programme (UNDP); the United Nations Industrial Development Organization (UNIDO); the United Nations Children Fund (UNICEF); the United Nations High Commissioner for Refugees (UNHCR); the United Nations Mine Service (UNMAS), the United Nations Office for the Coordination of Humanitarian Affairs (OCHA) and the World Bank. Also present is the International Organization for Migration (IOM).

Since Sudan has experienced civil war for many years, many non-governmental organisations (NGOs) are also involved in humanitarian efforts to help internally displaced people. The NGOs are working in every corner of Sudan, especially in the southern part and western parts. During the civil war, international non-governmental organisations such as the Red Cross were operating mostly in the south but based in the capital Khartoum. The attention of NGOs shifted shortly after the war broke out in the western part of Sudan known as Darfur. The most visible organisation in South Sudan is the Operation Lifeline Sudan (OLS) consortium. Some international trade organisations categorise Sudan as part of the Greater Horn of Africa

Even though most of the international organisations are substantially concentrated in both South Sudan and the Darfur region, some of them are working in the northern part as well. For example, the United Nations Industrial Development Organization is successfully operating in Khartoum, the capital. It is mainly funded by the European Union and recently opened more vocational training. The Canadian International Development Agency is operating largely in northern Sudan.

== Foreign policy ==
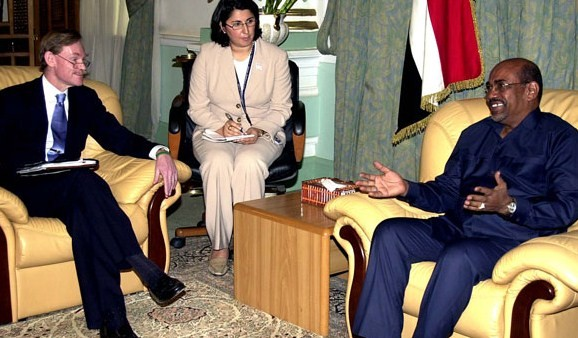
Al-Bashir and U.S. Deputy Secretary of State Robert Zoellick, 2005

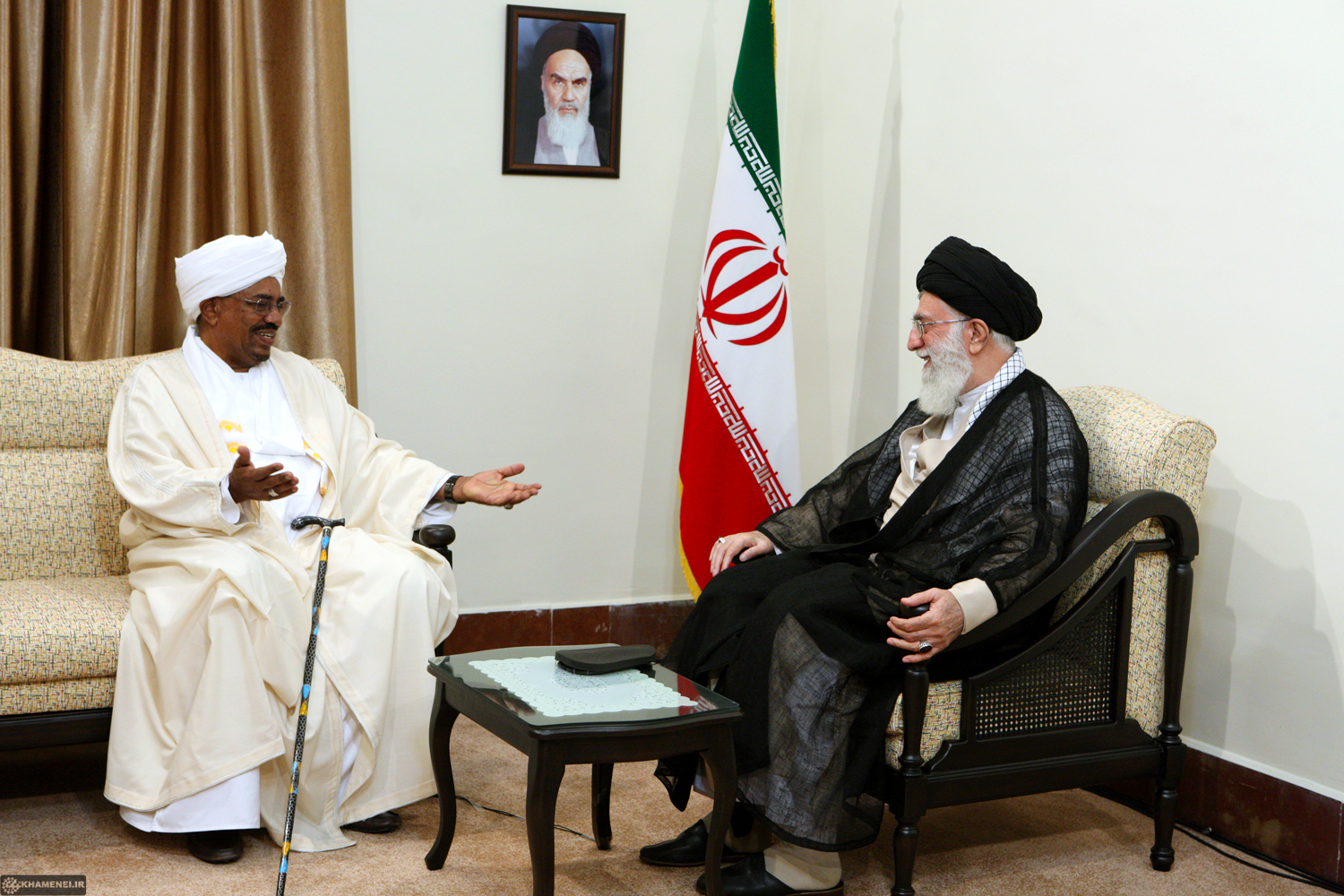
Al-Bashir with Iran's Supreme Leader Ali Khamenei, Tehran, 31 August 2012

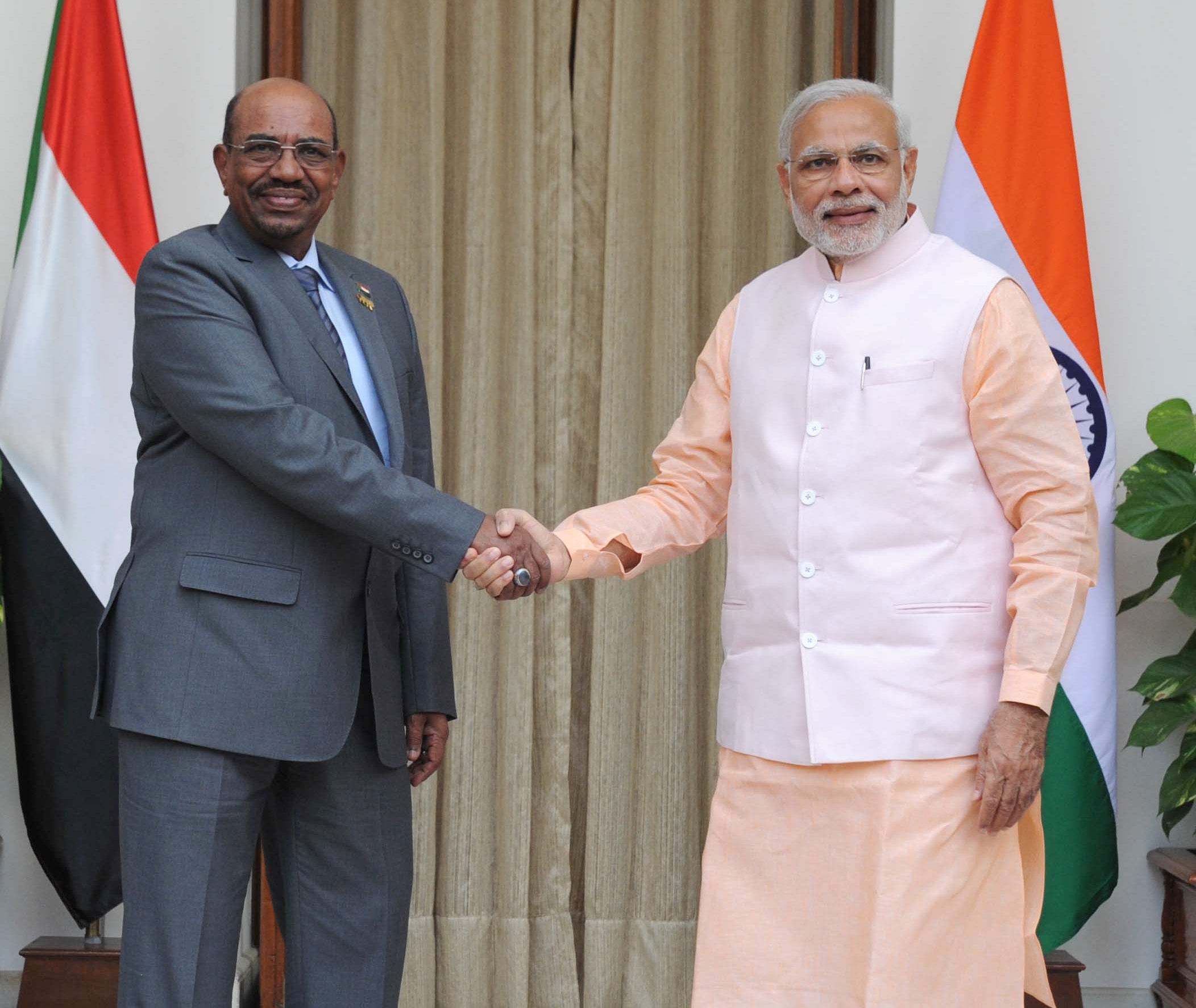
Al-Bashir meeting with Indian Prime Minister Narendra Modi, New Delhi, India, 30 October 2015

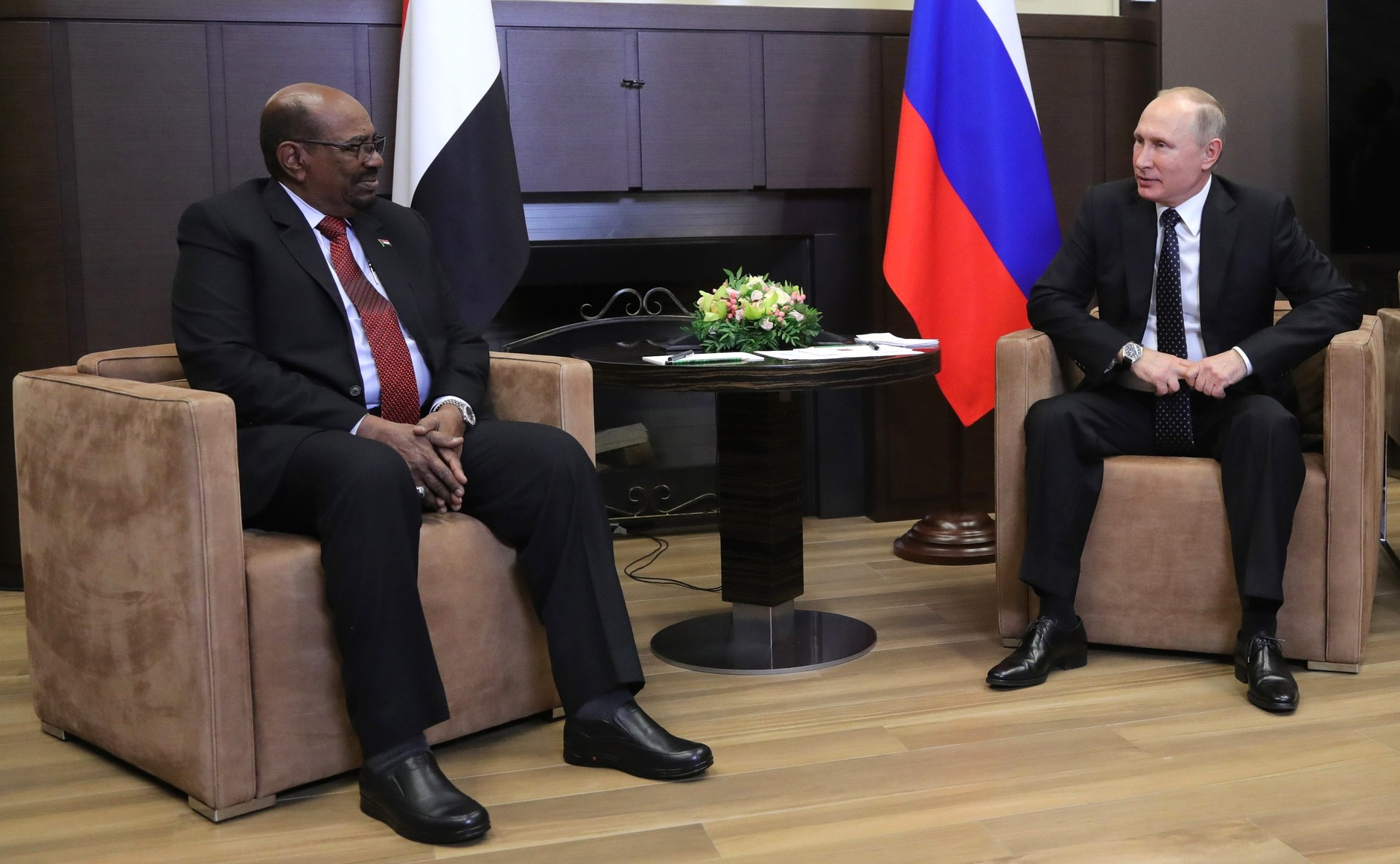
Al-Bashir and Russian President Vladimir Putin during a meeting in Sochi on 27 November 2017

From the early 1990s, after Omar al-Bashir assumed power, Sudan backed Iraq in its invasion of Kuwait and was accused of harboring and providing sanctuary and assistance to Islamic terrorist groups. Carlos the Jackal, Osama bin Laden, Abu Nidal and others labeled "terrorist leaders" by the United States and its allies resided in Khartoum. Sudan's role in the Popular Arab and Islamic Congress (PAIC), spearheaded by Hassan al-Turabi, represented a matter of great concern to the security of American officials and dependents in Khartoum, resulting in several reductions and evacuations of American personnel from Khartoum in the early to mid 1990s.

Sudan's Islamist links with international terrorist organizations represented a special matter of concern for the American government, leading to Sudan's 1993 designation as a state sponsor of terrorism and a suspension of U.S. Embassy operations in Khartoum in 1996. In late 1994, in an initial effort to reverse his nation's growing image throughout the world as a country harboring terrorists, Bashir secretly cooperated with French special forces to orchestrate the capture and arrest on Sudanese soil of Carlos the Jackal.

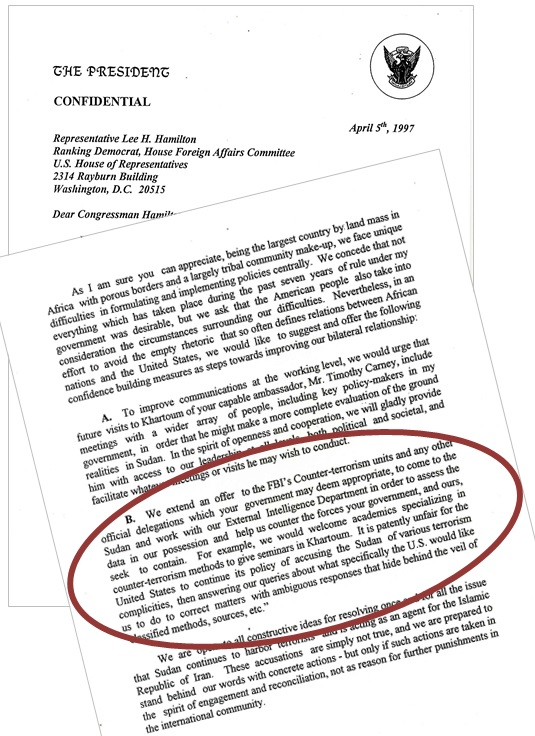
Sudan's offer of and request for counter-terrorism assistance, April 1997

In early 1996, al-Bashir authorized his Defense Minister at the time, El Fatih Erwa, to make a series of secret trips to the United States to hold talks with American officials, including officers of the CIA and United States Department of State about American sanctions policy against Sudan and what measures might be taken by the Bashir regime to remove the sanctions. Erwa was presented with a series of demands from the United States, including demands for information about Osama bin Laden and other radical Islamic groups. The US demand list also encouraged Bashir's regime to move away from activities, such as hosting the Popular Arab and Islamic Congress, that impinged on Sudanese efforts to reconcile with the West. Sudan's Mukhabarat (central intelligence agency) spent half a decade amassing intelligence data on bin Laden and a wide array of Islamists through their periodic annual visits for the PAIC conferences. In May 1996, after the series of Erwa secret meetings on US soil, the Clinton Administration demanded that Sudan expel Bin Laden. Bashir complied.

Controversy erupted about whether Sudan had offered to extradite bin Laden in return for rescinding American sanctions that were interfering with Sudan's plans to develop oil fields in southern areas of the country. American officials insisted the secret meetings were agreed only to pressure Sudan into compliance on a range of anti-terrorism issues. The Sudanese insisted that an offer to extradite bin Laden had been made in a secret one-on-one meeting at a Fairfax hotel between Erwa and the then CIA Africa Bureau chief on condition that Washington end sanctions against Bashir's regime. Ambassador Timothy M. Carney attended one of the Fairfax hotel meetings. In a joint opinion piece in the Washington Post Outlook Section in 2003, Carney and Ijaz argued that in fact the Sudanese had offered to extradite bin Laden to a third country in exchange for sanctions relief.

In August 1996, American hedge-fund manager Mansoor Ijaz traveled to Sudan and met with senior officials including al-Turabi and al-Bashir. Ijaz asked Sudanese officials to share intelligence data with US officials on bin Laden and other Islamists who had traveled to and from Sudan during the previous five years. Ijaz conveyed his findings to US officials upon his return, including Sandy Berger, then Clinton's deputy national security adviser, and argued for the US to constructively engage the Sudanese and other Islamic countries. In April 1997, Ijaz persuaded al-Bashir to make an unconditional offer of counterterrorism assistance in the form of a signed presidential letter that Ijaz delivered to Congressman Lee H. Hamilton by hand.

In late September 1997, months after the Sudanese overture (made by al-Bashir in the letter to Hamilton), the U.S. State Department, under Secretary of State Madeleine Albright's directive, first announced it would return American diplomats to Khartoum to pursue counterterrorism data in the Mukhabarat's possession. Within days, the U.S. reversed that decision and imposed harsher and more comprehensive economic, trade, and financial sanctions against Sudan, which went into effect in October 1997. In August 1998, in the wake of the East Africa embassy bombings, the U.S. launched cruise missile strikes against Khartoum. U.S. Ambassador to Sudan, Tim Carney, departed post in February 1996 and no new ambassador was designated until December 2019, when U.S. president Donald Trump's administration reached an agreement with the new Sudanese government to exchange ambassadors.

Al-Bashir announced in August 2015 that he would travel to New York in September to speak at the United Nations. It was unclear to date if al-Bashir would have been allowed to travel, due to previous sanctions. in 1997, after the U.S. placed sanctions on Sudan, banning all American companies from engaging in its oil sector, after allegations that the government of Omar al-Bashir was supporting terrorists and committing human rights violations. Bashir decided to travel to China in 1995 to request help in developing its oil sector and, this time, China agreed. This appeal came at an opportune moment since China had grown considerable interest in acquiring foreign oil reserves as its own oilfields had already surpassed peak production.

== See also ==
- History of Sudan
