= Omar Suleiman Adam =

Sudanese politician

Omar Suleiman Adam Wanis (Arabic: عمر سليمان أدم ونيس) is a Sudanese politician. He was state minister in Greater Kordofan State from 1991 to 1994 and in West Darfur State from 1994 to 1995. He was a member of the National Assembly of Sudan from 1996 to 2000 and 2005 to 2007. He was the governor of South Kordofan State from 2007 to 2009. Suleiman became a member of the Council of States of Sudan in 2011. He was elected as the speaker of the Council of States on 1 June 2015. He was ousted in the 2019 coup d'état.

Wanis was born in Al-Dabakar village in West Kordofan. He earned a bachelor's degree in education (mathematics and physics) in 1973.
