= Rashid Bakr =

Rashid Bakr may refer to:

- Rashid Bakr (musician) (born 1943), American free jazz drummer
- Rashid Bakr (politician) (1933–1988), Sudanese politician
