= Transitional Legislative Council (Sudan) =

Interim legislative body after President Omar al-Bashir's overthrow

Transitional Legislative Council المجلس التشريعي الانتقالي السوداني

Type
- Type: Unicameral

History
- Founded: 2019
- Preceded by: National Legislature

Leadership
- Speaker: TBD
- Seats: 300 (planned)

Meeting place
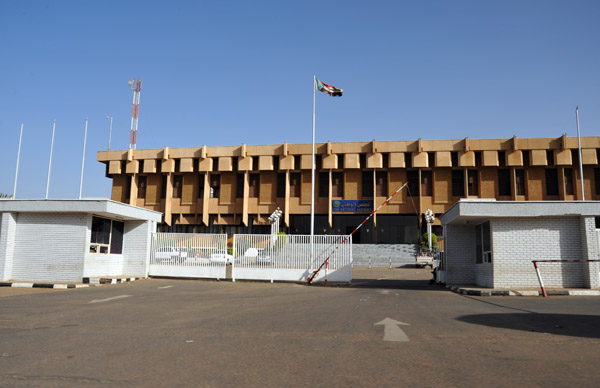
- Omdurman, Sudan

The Transitional Legislative Council (Arabic: المجلس التشريعي الانتقالي السوداني al majlis al tashrieiu al aintiqaliu al sudaniu) is a planned legislative body for Sudan to be formed as a stage in the Sudanese transition to democracy. As of 23 February 2025, the Transitional Legislative Council is not yet operational and instead, the members of the Transitional Sovereignty Council and Cabinet of Sudan constitute a Transitional Legislative Authority to act as the Sudan's interim legislature.

== Background ==
Prior to the overthrow of president Omar al-Bashir in a coup d'état on 11 April 2019, Sudan's National Legislature was bicameral with a 32-member Council of States and a 426-member National Assembly. As part of a transition to democracy, a 300-member Transitional Legislative Council was to have been formed to act as Sudan's legislature until elections planned for 2022. A transitional constitution was adopted in August 2019 resulting in a Transitional Sovereignty Council and interim government being formed. The transition period ended abruptly following a further coup d'état, led by Abdel Fattah al-Burhan, in October 2021. A civil war between the military Sudanese Armed Forces (SAF) led by Abdel Fattah al-Burhan and the paramilitary Rapid Support Forces (RSF) led by Mohamed Hamdan Dagalo broke out on 15 April 2023.

== Transitional Legislative Council proposed in 2019 ==
Under the terms of the constitutional declaration, a Transitional Legislative Council was to be formed within three months of the declaration entering into force. The Forces of Freedom and Change (FFC) group was to nominate two-thirds of the members of the council with the remaining third appointed by "other forces". The council was to have no more than 300 members of which a minimum of 40% should be women. Members of the National Congress Party (NCP) were not permitted to be members of the council. Other criteria for membership are being a Sudanese national, at least 21 years old, not having been convicted of a criminal offence, possessing integrity and competence and being able to read and write.

Lebanese academic Gilbert Achcar credits the No to Oppression against Women Initiative and Women of Sudanese Civic and Political Groups for having been influential in obtaining the 40% quota for women.

In November 2019, the FFC stated that the distribution of seats would be proportional to the population distribution, "taking into account the representation of all communities in Sudan". Following the signing of a peace agreement signed on 31 August 2020 between the Transitional Government of Sudan and rebel factions in Darfur, South Kordofan and Blue Nile State, a quarter of seats on the council will be reserved for the members of those factions.

== Transitional Legislative Authority ==
On 23 February 2025, the transitional constitution was amended to extend the transitional period for a further 39 months. The amended constitution empowers the members of the Transitional Sovereignty Council and the Cabinet of Sudan to jointly constitute a Transitional Legislative Authority which acts as Sudan's interim legislature until the Transitional Legislative Council is established.

On 19 May 2025, the Transitional Sovereignty Council named Kamil Idris prime minister, the first civilian to hold the office since Abdalla Hamdok's resignation in January 2022; he was formally appointed on 31 May 2025. The appointment of a civilian-led transitional government was welcomed by the United Nations, African Union and the Intergovernmental Authority on Development.

As of 2026, the Transitional Legislative Council had still not been established, and the Transitional Legislative Authority continued to act as Sudan's interim legislature.

== See also ==
- Politics of Sudan
- Government of Sudan
- Sudanese Revolution
