= Ali Yahya Abdullah =

Sudanese politician

Ali Yahya Abdullah is a Sudanese politician and former president of the Council of States of Sudan.

Abdullah was born in 1951 in Geneina, Sudan. He earned a law degree in Omdurman Islamic University. Later he worked in West Darfur state judiciary. He was appointed to the Constitutional Court of Sudan in 1998.

Abdullah was appointed as the president of the Council of States of Sudan on 31 August 2005, and served until 2010.
