= Corruption in Sudan =

Corruption in Sudan is widespread, as it is considered one of the most corrupt nations in the world. On the 2010 World Bank Worldwide Governance Indicators, on a one hundred point scale, it scored in the single digits in every category, including 0.9 for political stability, 6.2 for rule of law, 7.2 for regulatory quality, 6.7 for government effectiveness, and 4.3 for control of corruption. In 2011 Freedom House named Sudan as one of the worst nations for human rights.

Sudan presents one of the most challenging business environments in the world. Sectors where foreign investments are concentrated, such as construction and transportation, are recognized worldwide as being very prone to corruption. Corruption exists in every sector of the economy and in every level of the Sudanese government. It takes the form of "financial and political corruption, nepotism, and misuse of power". According to the Sudan Democracy First Group, petty corruption is pervasive for citizens seeking government services.

One source notes the ubiquity in Sudan of "petty and grand corruption, embezzlement of public funds, and a system of political patronage well entrenched within the fabrics of society", and that the effects of corruption are often obfuscated by constant instability. While patronage negatively affects businesses, police and military corruption infringes on civil rights.

In the years preceding the civil war, Sudan had experienced rapid economic growth, mainly owing to its natural resources, including several high-demand natural resources, increasing the opportunities for corruption.

== Background ==
Colonel Omar al-Bashir took power during an Islamic 1989 coup after which he executed 30 military officers who initiated a failed coup attempt in 1990. He acceded to the presidency in 1993. He then took further measures to silence his opposition including numerous executions.

The Second Sudanese Civil War ended in 2005, and after a long ceasefire, in 2011 South Sudan gained independence. Nonetheless, corruption remained rampant, all while a new conflict arose in Darfur, between government-supported Janjaweed forces and rebel groups seeking control of state natural resources. By 2009 the conflict was deemed a genocide and the International Criminal Court called for al-Bashir's arrest.

== Corruption in the public sector ==
Corruption is common among Sudanese government officials, who routinely act with total impunity, knowing that they will almost certainly not be investigated for any transgression. Sources have stated that the opportunities for corruption are created by an inefficient administration and bureaucracy, along with poor record-keeping and a lack of transparency. Bribes are commonly demanded by government employees.

On Transparency International's 2025 Corruption Perceptions Index, Sudan scored 14 on a scale from 0 ("highly corrupt") to 100 ("very clean"). When ranked by score, Sudan ranked 175th among the 182 countries in the Index, where the country ranked first is perceived to have the most honest public sector. For comparison with regional scores, the best score among sub-Saharan African countries (Note: Angola, Benin, Botswana, Burkina Faso, Burundi, Cameroon, Cape Verde, Central African Republic, Chad, Comoros, Côte d'Ivoire, Democratic Republic of the Congo, Djibouti, Equatorial Guinea, Eritrea, Eswatini, Ethiopia, Gabon, Gambia, Ghana, Guinea, Guinea-Bissau, Kenya, Lesotho, Liberia, Madagascar, Malawi, Mali, Mauritania, Mauritius, Mozambique, Namibia, Niger, Nigeria, Republic of the Congo, Rwanda, Sao Tome and Principe, Senegal, Seychelles, Sierra Leone, Somalia, South Africa, South Sudan, Sudan, Tanzania, Togo, Uganda, Zambia, and Zimbabwe.) was 68, the average was 32 and the worst was 9. For comparison with worldwide scores, the best score was 89 (ranked 1), the average was 42, and the worst was 9 (ranked 181, in a two-way tie).

=== Bribery ===
Bribery is a commonplace demand made by public officials for services that the citizenry is entitled to by law. Of respondents to a 2011 Transparency International survey who had dealt with various Sudanese government entities, almost a quarter were forced to pay bribes. Bribery demands were particularly high among the police, the customs bureau, tax authorities, and land services.

=== Police ===
Sudanese police officers are alleged to have committed several human rights abuses, including making arbitrary and unwarranted arrests. Law enforcement officials are said to receive bribes regularly from the citizenry. In addition, investigations lack any due process and retaliations against police critics are common.

The Sudanese police force is said to surpass all other government agencies in the public's perception of corrupt agencies. In addition, law-enforcement officers are subject to interference by government officials, and hiring for the police force can often be explained by political connections rather than by professional qualifications.

=== Judiciary ===
The Sudanese judiciary is not an independent branch of government and is therefore subject to influence by other branches of government. Efficiency in the courts is also hampered by inadequate resources, poor infrastructure, poor training, inadequate salaries, and long delays before trial. Freedom House reported that courts are often subject to political manipulation and fail to meet international legal standards.

=== Customs officials ===
Customs regulations are not uniformly enforced. Companies and officials with political connections are often exempted from customs duties and earn income through importing goods without paying tariffs.

=== Job appointments ===
In August 2015, the head of the Darfur Regional Authority (DRA) and former head of the Liberation and Justice Movement (LJM), were publicly accused of corruption. Abu Garda said Sese had complete authority over appointing government positions at every level. In other words, Sese had stripped all authority from the DRA, as a result of which the Council of Ministers had a total of four meetings in four years. Abu Garda said that the people of Darfur should impeach Sese as president of the DRA for failure to implement a recovery and enabling corruption in the Disarmament, demobilization and reintegration program.

=== Procurement ===
Sudanese legislation is supposed to address conflicts of interest on the part of public procurement officials and is also supposed to provide for the monitoring of these officials' finances, but in practice these laws are not enforced. Companies with Islamist connections are unfairly awarded public contracts without following the proper procedures for bidding. They subsequently subcontract to party loyalists, eliminating any competition, leading to a high frequency of small businesses failing.

=== Ministry of Finance and budgeting ===
In January 2014, the Sudanese Ministry of Finance was accused by El Tahir Abdel Gayoum, an auditing body, of omitting £s.16 billion in liabilities from its ledger. The auditors noted other irregularities, including the retention by ministries of $12.1 million in funds intended for the finance ministry, the spending of extra-budgetary funds by some government units, the retention of consultants whose contracts had not been renewed, the retention on the payroll of former government employees, and the awarding of bids by influential government figures to associates at above-market prices and without written contracts.

In March 2014, economic minister Adel Abdel Aziz, held the Ministry of Finance responsible for Sudan's poor showing on international corruption indexes. He accused the Ministry of Finance of mismanaging the budget and of administrative negligence and said that the Ministry uses political power to force tenders, bribery, royalties, and allocation of lands to their benefit.

The Sudanese budget is alleged to be completely opaque and therefore easily allow embezzlement. Sudan was ranked lowest score in all of East Africa on the 2010 Open Budget Index. According to the United States sources, over US$2 billion of public funding was embezzled in 2008. The entire military budget is undisclosed, allowing for no insight into spending.

Tax collection in Sudan is characterized as lacking the rule of law where the politically connected are given breaks, but all others suffer unjustly high taxes. There is no uniform tax code across the country, leading many to misreport incomes and apply creative methods to cheat taxes. In addition, the one agency involved in fixing the tax code lacks the necessary resources and independence to sufficiently improve the tax environment.

=== Treatment of media ===
Media outlets in Sudan are subjected to political manipulations and lack journalistic independence. As a result, government agencies regularly censor newspapers and mandate outlets to release pro-government stories.

Under the 2009 Press and Publication Act, journalists and others who are critical of the government can face harassment and arrest, as well as violence in some cases. Several private newspapers have faced arrests, seizures, and raids. Visas are denied to some foreign reporters as well.

According to the Radio Dabanga website, the Sudanese Security Service monitors all Sudanese newspapers daily, demanding editors delete and censor news about corruption, security, or the war crimes committed by the government against its own citizens in Darfur, South Kordofan, and along the Blue Nile. Also, several journalists have noted that the ruling National Congress Party does not allow any media to be published not in their interests.

On 22 January 2014, members of Sudanese police in Khartoum confiscated all of that day's El Jareeda newspapers at the printer. The government did not explain the action, although the headline story in that day's newspaper was about corruption at the Sudanese Cottons Company. El Jareeda's story reported that the Auditor General's office had accused Badr El Din Mahmoud, Minister of Finance and former deputy director of the Bank of Sudan, of several crimes including forgery and misuse of legal tender, while he was chairman of the Committee on Purchases of the New Ginneries.

In July 2015, the Sudanese government ordered the director of the National Television and Radio Corporation to stop airing "Beit El Jalous", a new radio show hosted by screenwriter and psychologist Ali Baldo, who on the program addressed rising corruption and nepotism in Sudan. Baldo accused prominent leaders and major figures in the media of pressuring officials to stop the series.

=== Treatment of NGOs ===
Conditions for NGOs in Sudan, according to Freedom House, have worsened significantly due to antagonism towards government critics. In 2009, when an arrest warrant was issued for Omar al-Bashir, Sudan responded by expelling several international humanitarian aid organizations, revoking permits for thirteen foreign NGOs and permanently shutting down three domestic NGOs.

=== Elections ===
Elections in Sudan are riddled with corruption. Bashir was re-elected by a large majority in the 2010 elections, the country's first open election in over two decades, but international observers expressed deep concern about extensive fraud and intimidation. According to the observers, the election was not fair by international standards; the US State Department deemed them unfree and unfair.

Fairness in the 2010 election was rendered impossible by the strict limits on freedom of the press, assembly, and expression, by a lack of media coverage, and by the buying of votes. While some opposition parties boycotted the 2010 elections, other opposition parties that took part in them refused to recognize the results, charging voting fraud. Prior to the elections, several candidates have been known to withdraw their candidacies in exchange for explicit and implicit bribes. This practice has made it common for some to run without the intent of taking office, but rather be offered a bargain to withdraw from the election.

Writing in the New York Daily News about the April 2010 elections, Dan Morrison stated that in addition to such "structural issues" as "the manipulated census, the gerrymandering, the packing of the National Election Commission with ruling party retainers, or the use of patronage to secure blocks of votes and suppress competition", there were reports of school children who were allowed to cast votes; soldiers who voted "both at their duty station and also, magically, at their home villages hundreds of miles away"; election officials who used "solvents to dilute the indelible ink that is meant to stain the fingers and prevent repeat voting"; and "stuffed or stolen" ballot boxes.

=== Sale of public lands ===
In 2014 public lands were sold in great quantity in southern Darfur. In November of that year an investigation was launched to determine if these lands were sold to ineligible owners with government connections, without the proper consent. In turn, the investigative committee was accused of neglecting legal recourse against those responsible for the illegal sales.

=== DDR misappropriations ===
In late 2014, the nation's Minister of Health, accused Dr. Tijani Sese, leader of the Liberation and Justice Movement (LJM), of using his own personal guard rather than LJM operatives to aid in the DDR program, allowing for over $2 billion of public funding to be misappropriated by private soldiers and embezzled into undisclosed accounts.

== Corruption in business ==
Sudan's business sector is rife with corruption, due to no mechanisms existing to promote transparency. Several international business organizations have warned investors that Sudan's business environment is considered high-risk.

Doing business in Sudan requires unordinary excessive amounts of documentation, fees, and procedures which all increase the likelihood of public officials soliciting bribes to ease the process or ignore certain rules. Sudan was ranked 135th (of 183 countries) on the 2012 Ease of doing business index. The Financial Standards Foundation characterized Sudan in 2010 as a difficult nation to conduct business.

=== The oil sector ===
After South Sudan seceded, taking with it most of Sudan's oil wealth, the Sudanese government imposed greater rule and regulation of the remaining industry. Omar al-Bashir is alleged to have funnelled the nation's oil revenues into his own private accounts. A leaked diplomatic cable alleged that al-Bashir embezzled nearly US$9 billion in Sudanese oil revenues.

=== Sports ===
According to a September 2015 report, a lack of oversight governing the sale of tickets to soccer matches has led to the emergence of a criminal network that profits illegally by manipulating the sale of ticket sales. The people involved in this corruption are the stadium ticket-sellers, stadium employees, and the relevant regulatory authorities.

The stadium employees only tear a handful of the tickets they are handed by fans. They then resell the bulk of them to the ticket seller, who in turn sell them back to the public, greatly overfilling the stadiums.

The scheme is said to be run by a mafia. Also, some fans can get into games by bribing stadium employees with an amount less than the ticket price, while the stadium can report the full seat price as an expense. This scheme results in substantial financial losses for football clubs and the cities in which they are based and causes widespread consternation. But the Sudanese Football Association, which employs these people, has failed to address it seriously.

=== Transport ===
Corruption is endemic in the sale of bus tickets. After approximately half the tickets for any given bus trip have been sold at the ticket office for the official price, the sale is cut off and the bus conductors then start selling the remaining tickets on the black market for almost double the official price. When would-be ticket buyers complain, they are informed that the tickets have been reserved for soldiers, or that the tickets have been reserved in advance by other passengers.

Moreover, after all the tickets have been sold, either legally or illegally, the conductor and driver load yet more passengers onto the bus, usually under the supervision of traffic enforcement who purposefully do not report newly added passengers. These police are therefore participants in this corrupt system.

In addition, they record a false departure time for the bus, so that the driver can drive faster and make extra trips. Also involved in this scheme are police officers at highway checkpoints, who play along with these deceptions. This kind of corruption not only cheats customers but endangers them and others, and in case of a bus accident would invalidate any insurance claims.

== Nepotism ==
Nepotism and favoritism are rampant problems. It is common practice for businessmen to pay kickbacks to family members in government positions in exchange for contracts.

Top leaders of the ruling party control at least 164 companies. Among the richest men in Sudan, for example, is one of President Bashir's brothers, who controls the cement industry and is the chief supplier of the Merowe Dam construction firm. Two other brothers of Bashir are reportedly majority shareholders of a firm that owns shares of over twenty of the largest subsidiaries.

== Corruption in mine disposal program ==
Dismissed employees of the Sudanese Association for Combating Mines (Jasmar), accused its director in November 2014 of stealing large numbers of technical devices borrowed from the UN, of creating shell companies in Ed Daein, East Darfur, and Zalingei, Central Darfur, of forging invoices, and of making off with "vehicles, office furniture, and other equipment" worth about half a million Sudanese pounds. The director had also allegedly dealt out over 20 Toyota Land Cruisers to individuals who were in no way associated with the mine disposal program, charged one dismissed official, who also said that three major power generators had also gone missing.

== Anti-corruption efforts ==
Until recently, Sudan had no federal anti-corruption agency. Corruption charges were almost never investigated, although the Auditor General urged the prosecution of certain officials for embezzling public funds. At an emergency cabinet meeting in March 2014, President Bashir ordered his Council of Ministers to combat corruption and introduced an anti-corruption reform plan which would be implemented by a new committee and five new sub-committees. Despite the government's claims to want to fight corruption, its anti-corruption agency has so far failed to bring corrupt public officials to justice.

The relevant public disclosing body is supposed to serve as an ombudsman, but is underfunded and lacks independence. The office of the Auditor General is nominally independent under Sudanese law, but in practice is subject to political influence. The office also has insufficient resources and the government rarely takes any serious steps to combat corruption. The office has itself, moreover, been the target of corruption allegations. In a 2007 case, three high-ranking officials in the office were suspended in an embezzlement case.

According to one source, Sudan has poor anti-corruption measures in place due to weak administrative protocols, "wavering" political will to combat corruption, and a blurred distinction between the government and the ruling political party. Sudan has endorsed anti-corruption protocols from the United Nations. Still, however, public officials are not required to disclose their finances and there is no provision for transparency.

Sudanese criminal law is supposed to protect officials who report corruption. In practice, however, whistleblowers often experience retaliation.

== See also ==
- International Anti-Corruption Academy
- Group of States Against Corruption
- International Anti-Corruption Day
- ISO 37001 Anti-bribery management systems
- United Nations Convention against Corruption
- OECD Anti-Bribery Convention
- Transparency International
