= Council of States of Sudan =

Upper house of the parliament of Sudan

Council of States of Sudan مجلس الولايات السوداني
- 5th National Legislature
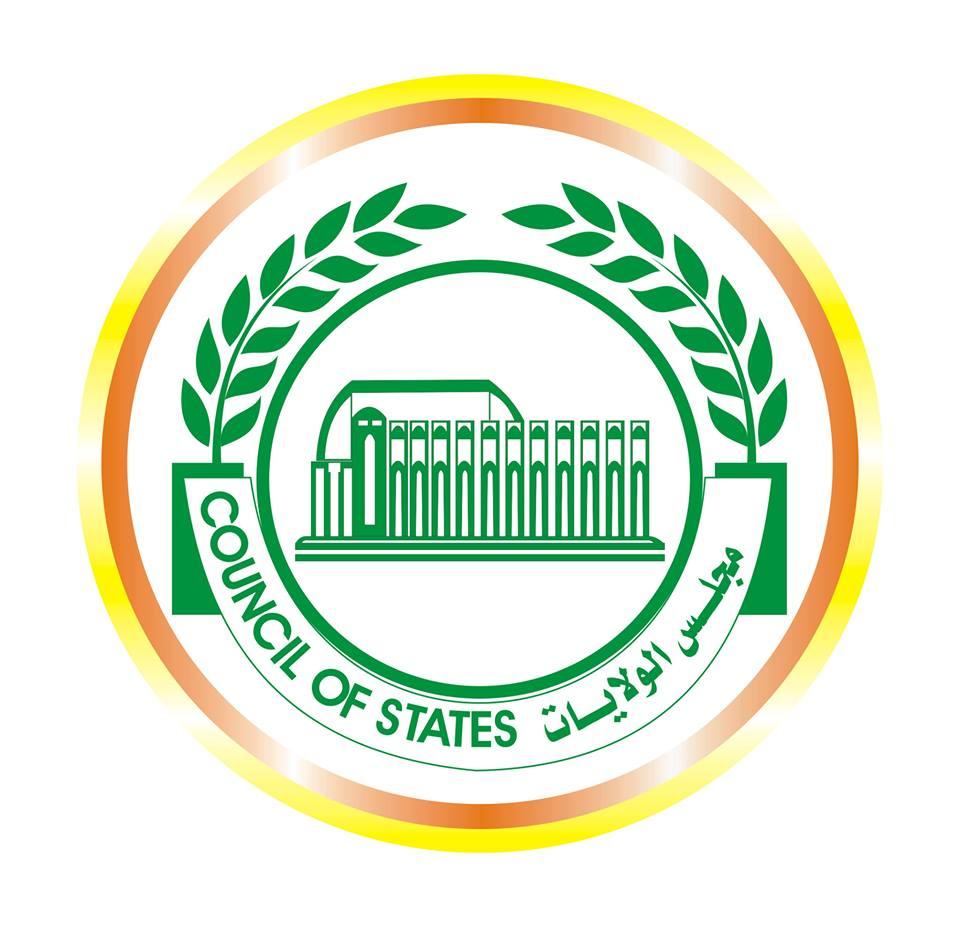

Type
- Type: Upper house

History
- Founded: August 2005
- Disbanded: May 2019

Leadership
- Speaker: Omar Suleiman Adam (last)

Structure
- Seats: 32
- Political groups: Partisan (28); Vacant (4)
- Length of term: 5 years

Elections
- Voting system: Indirect election
- First election: 2005
- Last election: 19 May 2015

Meeting place
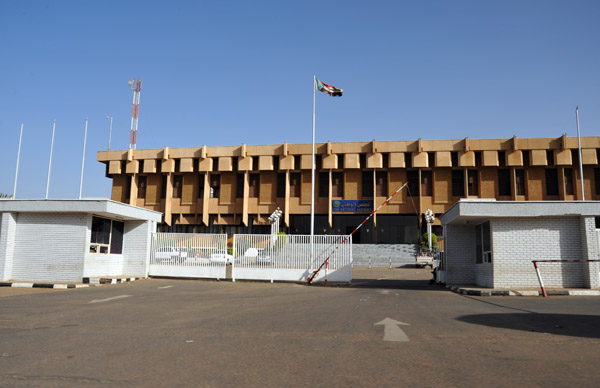
- Omdurman, Sudan

Website
- The Council of States (permanent dead link)

The Council of States (Arabic: مجلس الولايات السوداني, Maǧlis al-Wilāyāt) was the upper house of the National Legislature of Sudan from 2005 to 2019. It was established as part of the Comprehensive Peace Agreement (CPA) which aimed to end the long-standing civil war between the Sudanese government and rebel groups in southern Sudan. The CPA provided for the creation of a bicameral National Legislature, consisting of the Council of States and the National Assembly.

The National Legislature, which includes the Council of States, was dissolved on 11 April 2019 following the overthrow of President Omar al-Bashir and his National Congress Party in a military coup.

However, following the ousting of President Omar al-Bashir and his National Congress Party in a military coup on 11 April 2019, the National Legislature, including the Council of States, was dissolved. The coup was followed by months of protests and a power struggle between the military and civilian groups, which ultimately resulted in the formation of a transitional government in August 2019.

As part of the Sudanese transition to democracy, a Transitional Legislative Council is to be formed which will function as the legislature of Sudan until elections scheduled for 2022.

In August 2020, a power-sharing agreement was reached between Sudan's military and civilian leaders, which led to the formation of a transitional government with a joint military-civilian ruling council. The agreement also provided for the formation of a new legislative body, the Sovereign Council, which would serve as the country's interim legislative authority until elections could be held.

== Speakers ==
Position	Took office	Left office	Notes
Ali Yahya Abdullah	31 August 2005	2010	
Maj-Gen. Adam Hamid Musa	May 2010	2014	
Omar Suleiman Adam	1 June 2015	11 April 2019	
