= Rashid Bakr (politician) =

Vice President of Sudan (1976–1977)

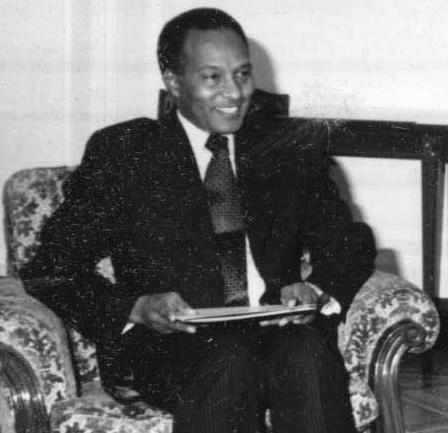
Rashid Bakr

El Rashid El Tahir Bakr (24 June 1933 – 11 March 1988) was a Sudanese politician during the rule of Gaafar Nimeiry, which lasted from 1969 to 1985.

== Biography ==
Bakr was born in the Karkoj Blue Nile region of Sudan. In 1958 he graduated from the University of Khartoum Faculty of Law. He was Vice President and Prime Minister of the Democratic Republic of Sudan from 11 August 1976 until 10 September 1977. He was the speaker of the National Assembly from 1974 to 1977 and from 1980 to 1981. He was Foreign Minister of Sudan from 1977 to 1980.

He was a member of the Sudanese Socialist Union.
