= National Assembly of Sudan =

Lower house of Sudan's legislature

National Assembly of Sudan الجمعية الوطنية السودانية
- 5th National Legislature

Type
- Type: Lower house Unicameral (1948–2005)

History
- Founded: 1948
- Disbanded: 2019

Leadership
- Speaker: Ibrahim Ahmed Omer Ahmed (last)

Structure
- Seats: 426
- Political groups: Government (323): National Congress Party (323); Opposition (103): Democratic Unionist Party (25); National Umma Party (3); Others (56); Independents (19)
- Length of term: 5 years

Elections
- Voting system: Mixed member majoritarian: 213 seats are elected by First-past-the-post; 128 seats reserved for women are elected by Closed list proportional representation; 85 seats unreserved are elected by Closed list proportional representation
- First election: 15 November 1948
- Last election: 13–16 April 2015

Meeting place
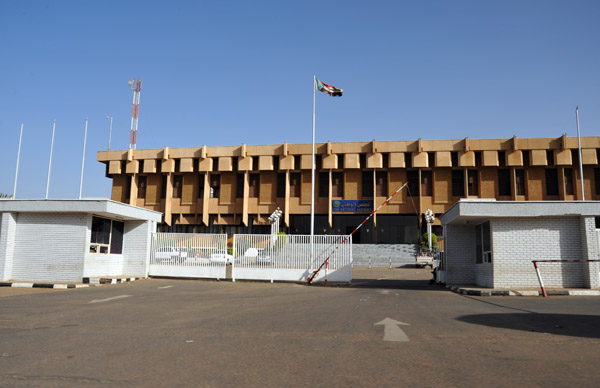
- Omdurman, Sudan

Website
- The National Assembly (permanent dead link)

The National Assembly (Arabic: الجمعية الوطنية السودانية, Al-Maǧlis al-Waṭaniy) was the lower house of the National Legislature of Sudan. The legislature was unicameral until 2005. The upper house was the Council of States (Majlis Welayat).

The National Assembly was dissolved on 11 April 2019 following a military coup which overthrew Sudan President Omar al-Bashir and Assembly's ruling National Congress Party.

As part of the Sudanese transition to democracy, a Transitional Legislative Council was to be formed which would function as the legislature of Sudan until elections scheduled for 2022. As of 2025, the Transitional Legislative Council has failed to be formed; rather, the members of the Transitional Sovereignty Council and Cabinet of Sudan constitute a Transitional Legislative Authority acting as Sudan's interim legislature.

== Speakers ==
Hassan Abdallah al-Turabi was the speaker from 1996 until he stripped of the post in December 1999, and placed under arrest after a falling out with President Omar al-Bashir.

Position	Name	Took office	Left office	Notes
President of the Assembly	Muhammad Salih Shingitti	1948	1953	
Speaker of the upper house, Senate	Ahmed Mohamed Yassin	1954	1956	
Speaker of the upper house, Senate	Mohammed El Hassan Diab	1956	1957	
Speaker of the lower house, House of Representatives	Babiker Awadalla	1954	1957	
Speaker of the lower house, House of Representatives	Muhammad Salih Shingitti	1957	November 1958	
Speaker of the upper house, Senate	Amin al-Sayed	1957	November 1958	
President of Central Council	Awad Abdel Rahman Sghir	1962	1964	
Chairman, first constituent assembly	Mubarak Fadel Shaddad	1965	1965	
Chairman, second constituent assembly	Mubarak Fadel Shaddad	1968	1969	
Chairman, people's assembly	Alnadhir Dafeallah	1972	1973	
Chairman, people's assembly	Rashid Bakr	1974	1976	
Chairman, people's assembly	Abu al-Qasim Hashim	1976	1980	
Chairman, people's assembly	Rashid Bakr	1980	1981	
Chairman, fifth people's assembly	Izz al-Din al-Sayed Mohammed	1982	1985	
Chairman, constituent assembly	Mohamed Ibrahim Khalil	1986	1988	
Chairman, constituent assembly	Mohamed Yousef Mohamed	1988	1989	
Chairman, constituent assembly	Farouk Ali Al-Barir	12 April 1989	30 June 1989	
Chairman, National Transitional Council	Mohamed Al-Amin Khalifa	1992	1996	
Speaker, National Assembly	Hassan al-Turabi	1996	December 1999	
Dissolved		December 1999	December 2000	
Speaker, National Assembly	Ahmed Ibrahim al-Tahir	2001	31 August 2005	
Speaker, National Assembly	Ahmed Ibrahim al-Tahir	31 August 2005	November 2013	
Speaker, National Assembly	Fatih Ezzedine al-Mansur	November 2013	1 June 2015	
Speaker, National Assembly	Ibrahim Ahmed Omer Ahmed	1 June 2015	11 April 2019	

== 2015–2019 session ==
The most recent session was elected in 2015.

Party	Votes	%	Seats	+/–
National Congress Party	4,321,901	83.4	323	–1
Democratic Unionist Party–Original	249,768	4.8	25	+24
Democratic Unionist Party	137,265	2.6	15	+11
Other parties	475,185	9.2	44	–
Independents	475,185	9.2	19	+16
Invalid/blank votes	–	–	–	–
Total	5,184,119	100	426	–24
Registered voters/turnout	13,126,989	–	–	–
Source: Adam Carr Sudan News Agency

== 2010–2015 session ==
Sudan was previously in a transitional period following the signing of a Comprehensive Peace Agreement (CPA) on 9 January 2005 that officially ended the civil war between the Sudanese Government (based in Khartoum) and the southern-based Sudan People's Liberation Movement (SPLM) rebel group. The National Assembly consisted of 450 appointed members who represent the government, former rebels, and other opposition political parties. The National Assembly, whose members were appointed in mid-2005 replaced the latest elected parliament. All members of the National Legislature serve six-year terms. Article 117 of the Interim Constitution called for the 450 members of the National Assembly to be appointed according to the following power-sharing formula:

National Congress Party Party (52%)

- 49% to northerners

Other Arab political parties (14%)

- Umma Party (Hizb al-Umma)
- Democratic Unionist Party
- Sudanese Communist Party
- Sudanese Ba'ath Party

Sudan People's Liberation Movement (28%)

- 28% to southerners

Other Black political parties (6%)

- United Democratic Sudan Forum
- Union of Sudan African Parties 1
- Union of Sudan African Parties 2
- United Democratic Front
- South Sudan Democratic Forum/ Democratic Forum for South Sudan
- Sudan African National Union

Composition of the National Assembly following the 2010 election and the independence of South Sudan.

Party	2010 Election Results	Following independence of South Sudan
National Congress Party	324	316
Sudan People's Liberation Movement	99	8
Popular Congress Party	4	4
Democratic Unionist Party	4	4
Federal Umma Party	4	3
Umma Party for Reform and Development	3	2
Democratic Unionist Party - Original	1	0
Sudan People's Liberation Movement–Democratic Change	2	0
Umma Collective Leadership	1	1
Federal Umma Party	1	1
National Umma Party	1	1
Muslim Brotherhood	1	1
Independents	3	3
Vacant	4	8
Total	450	354

== Parliament building ==
The seat of the National Assembly is Omdurman, immediately north-west of the country's capital Khartoum. The building was designed in the style of brutalist architecture by the Romanian architect Cezar Lăzărescu and completed in 1978. It is located on the banks of the White Nile at the confluence with the Blue Nile near the old Omdurman bridge.
