= National Legislature of Sudan =

Bicameral legislature of Sudan

National Legislature of Sudan الهيئة التشريعية الوطنية السودانية

Type
- Type: Bicameral
- Houses: Council of States (upper house) National Assembly (lower house)

History
- Founded: 2005
- Disbanded: 2019
- Succeeded by: Transitional Legislative Council

Leadership
- Speaker of the Council of States: Omar Suleiman Adam (last)
- Speaker of the National Assembly: Ibrahim Ahmed Omer Ahmed (last)

Structure
- Seats: 458: Council of States: 32; National Assembly: 426
- Council of States political groups: Partisan (28); Vacant (4)
- National Assembly political groups: Government (323): National Congress Party (323); Opposition (103): Democratic Unionist Party (25); National Umma Party (3); Others (56); Independents (19)

Elections
- Council of States voting system: Indirect election
- National Assembly voting system: Mixed member majoritarian: 213 seats are elected by First-past-the-post; 128 seats reserved for women are elected by Closed list proportional representation; 85 seats unreserved are elected by Closed list proportional representation
- First Council of States election: 2005
- First National Assembly election: 15 November 1948
- Last Council of States election: 19 May 2015
- Last National Assembly election: 13–16 April 2015

Meeting place
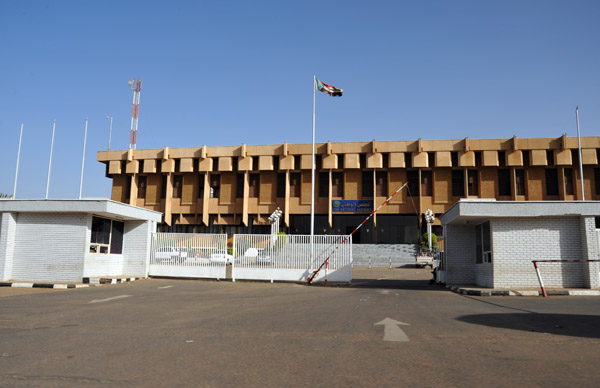
- Omdurman, Sudan

Website
- The National Legislature (permanent dead link)

The National Legislature of Sudan (Arabic: الهيئة التشريعية الوطنية السودانية, al-maǧlis at-tašrīʿī) is the legislative branch of the government of Sudan.

Prior to the 2019 coup d'état, it was composed of two chambers:

- The Council of States (مجلس الولايات السوداني, al-maǧlis al-wilāyāt).
- The National Assembly (الجمعية الوطنية السودانية, al-maǧlis al-waṭaniy).

The National Legislature was dissolved on 11 April 2019 following the overthrow of President Omar al-Bashir and his National Congress Party in a military coup.

As part of the Sudanese transition to democracy, a Transitional Legislative Council was to have been formed which would function as the legislature of Sudan until elections initially scheduled for 2022.

Amendments made to the transitional constitution in February 2025, established a "Transitional Legislative Authority" made up of the members of the Transitional Sovereignty Council and Cabinet of Sudan to act as an interim legislature until a Transitional Legislative Council is formally established.

== Latest election ==
=== National Assembly ===
Party	Proportional			Women			Constituency			Total seats	+/–
Party	Votes	%	Seats	Votes	%	Seats	Votes	%	Seats	Total seats	+/–
National Congress Party	3,915,590	78.32	67	4,321,901	83.37	107			149	323	–1
Democratic Unionist Party–Original	218,120	4.36	4	249,768	4.82	6			15	25	+24
Umma Collective Leadership	214,531	4.29	4						2	6	+5
Democratic Unionist Party	114,806	2.30	2	137,265	2.65	3			10	15	+11
Federal Umma Party	79,292	1.59	1	107,102	2.07	3			3	7	+4
Freedom and Justice Party	60,373	1.21	1	36,899	0.71	1			1	3	–
United Umma Party	49,923	1.00	1	63,770	1.23	2			1	4	–
Umma Reform and Development Party	35,309	0.71	1	45,199	0.87	1			3	5	–
National Umma Party	30,966	0.62	1						2	3	+2
Federal Truth Party	30,254	0.61	1	33,046	0.64	1			0	2	–
National Bond Party	30,079	0.60	1	43,199	0.83	1			0	2	–
National Freedom and Justice Party	29,642	0.59	1						3	4	–
Constitution Party	27,466	0.55	0	39,783	0.77	1			0	1	–
Movement for Justice and Equality	26,723	0.53	0	18,493	0.36	0			0	0	–
National Reform Party	25,990	0.52	0	30,107	0.58	1			0	1	–
Popular Forces for Rights and Democracy Movement	23,089	0.46	0	27,260	0.53	1			0	1	–
Justice Party	18,196	0.36	0						0	0	–
National Movement for Peace and Development	17,231	0.34	0	14,732	0.28	0			0	0	–
Sudanese Socialist Democratic Union	16,508	0.33	0						0	0	–
People's Movement Party	14,018	0.28	0	15,595	0.30	0			1	1	–
Sudanese National Front Party	12,740	0.25	0						0	0	–
Sudanese Socialist Union Party al-Maywa	8,686	0.17	0						0	0	–
Centre Party for Justice and Development									1	1	–
General Federation of North and South Funj									1	1	–
Ana al-Sudan									1	1	–
Black Free									1	1	–
Independents									19	19	+16
Total	4,999,532	100.00	85	5,184,119	100.00	128			213	426	–24
Registered voters/turnout	13,126,989	–		13,126,989	–		13,126,989	–			
Source: NEC

== Parliament building ==
The seat of the National Legislature is in Omdurman, immediately north-west of the country's capital Khartoum. The building was designed in the style of brutalist architecture by the Romanian architect Cezar Lăzărescu and completed in 1978. It is located on the banks of the White Nile at the confluence with the Blue Nile near the old Omdurman bridge.

== See also ==
- Transitional Legislative Council (Sudan)
- List of legislatures by country
