= Revolutionary Command Council for National Salvation =

1989–1993 governing body of Sudan following the 1989 coup

Military government overview
- Formed: 30 June 1989
- Dissolved: 16 October 1993
- Jurisdiction: Republic of Sudan
- Military government executives: Omar al-Bashir, Chairman; Zubair Mohamed Salih, Deputy chairman; Abdel Rahim Mohammed Hussein, Secretary-General

The Revolutionary Command Council for National Salvation (RCCNS) was the governing body of Sudan following the June 1989 coup. It grew out of the collaboration between the Sudanese Armed Forces and the National Islamic Front. It was the authority by which the military government of Sudan under Lt. Gen. Omar al-Bashir exercised power.

Al-Bashir was the chair of the council, as well as Prime Minister, Defense Minister and Commander-in-Chief of the Sudanese Armed Forces. The rest of the council consisted of fourteen military officers, all of whom were involved in and associated with the coup. Therefore, no regulations about the selection and tenure of its members were declared to the public.

The RCCNS exercised legislative as well as some executive authority. It appointed committees to draft various legal decrees including the Criminal Act 1991. The RCCNS did not publish any rules of procedures over its deliberations.

It banned political activity, arrested opposition members and closed down newspapers.

The RCCNS survived a coup attempt in 1990.

Among the RCCNS members were ethnic Fur Brigadier al-Tijani al-Tahir, Major General Zubeir and Major Ibrahim Shams al-Din. All three had strong ties to Libya and Muammar Gaddafi.

Al-Bashir dissolved the RCCNS in October 1993 and appointed himself President. The powers of the RCCNS were devolved to the President and the National Legislature of Sudan. This resulted in a majority of the power remaining with al-Bashir.

== Sources ==
- Helen Chapin Metz (ed.). "Government". A Country Study: Sudan. U.S. Library of Congress.
- "Sudan's President Bashir". Profiles. BBC News Online. 2003-11-25.
