= National Congress Party (Sudan) =

1998–2019 ruling party of Sudan

National Congress Party حزب المؤتمر الوطني
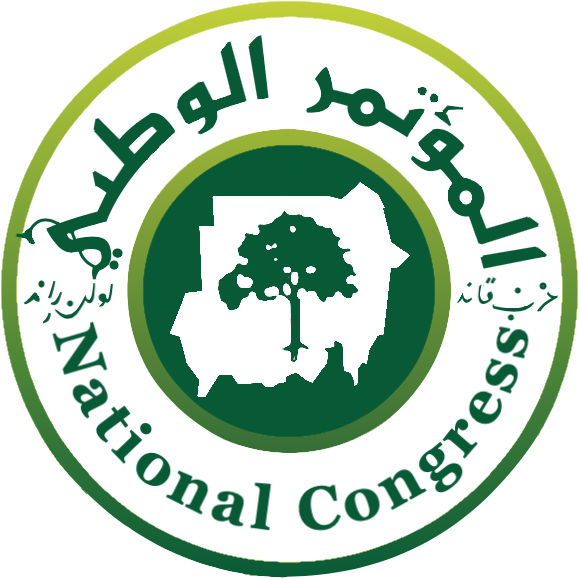
- Abbreviation: NCP
- Leader: Omar al-Bashir
- Founded: 1998; 28 years ago
- Banned: 29 November 2019 (6 years, 310 days)
- Preceded by: National Islamic Front
- Headquarters: Khartoum
- Armed wing: Popular Defence Forces
- Ideology: Arab–Islamic nationalism Salafism; Social conservatism Authoritarianism; Militarism; Right-wing populism Islamic economics Neoliberalism
- Political position: Right-wing to far-right
- Religion: Sunni Islam
- International affiliation: Muslim Brotherhood
- Colours: Green
- National Assembly (2015): 323 / 426 (76%)

The National Congress Party (NCP; Arabic: حزب المؤتمر الوطني, Ḥizb al-Mu'tamar al-Waṭanī) was a major political party of ousted Sudanese President Omar al-Bashir, it dominated domestic politics in Sudan from its foundation until it was banned following the Sudanese revolution.

After a military coup in 1969, Sudanese President Gaafar Nimeiry abolished all other political parties, effectively dissolving the Islamic parties. Following political transition in 1985, the leader of Islamic Charter Front (ICF), Hassan al-Turabi, reorganised the former party into the National Islamic Front (NIF), which pushed for an Islamist constitution. The NIF ultimately backed another military coup bringing to power Omar al-Bashir, who publicly endorsed the NIF's Islamist agenda. The party structure was composed at the national level of the General Conference, the Shura Council and the Leadership Council, and the Executive Office.

After the split of the NIF, the party was divided into two parties. The Islamic Movement led by its secretary Hassan al-Turabi and the military commanded by Omar al-Bashir launched a military coup against Prime Minister Sadiq al-Mahdi and President Ahmed al-Mirghani in 1989. Omar al-Bashir, who also became Chairman of the National Congress Party (NCP) and President of Sudan, seized power and began institutionalising Sharia at a national level.

The NCP was established in 1998 by key political figures in the National Islamic Front as well as other politicians. The rule of the NCP was the longest in independent contemporary Sudanese history. It grew out of the Islamist student activism of the Muslim Brotherhood, passing through the same revolutionary salafi jihadism. The party followed the ideologies of Islamism, Pan-Arabism, and Arab nationalism.

The NCP was banned by the Transitional Sovereignty Council in the aftermath of the military takeover on 29 November 2019. All party properties were confiscated and all party members were barred from participating in elections or holding office for ten years.

== History ==
=== Formation ===
NCP logo used in the 2010 Sudanese general election, dropped after South Sudan gained independence in 2011.

With Omar al-Bashir becoming President of Sudan, the National Congress Party (NCP) was established as the only legally recognised political party in the nation in 1998, with the very same ideology as its predecessors National Islamic Front (NIF) and the Revolutionary Command Council for National Salvation (RCCNS), which Omar al-Bashir headed as chairman until 1993. As the sole political party in the state, its members quickly came to dominate the entire Sudanese parliament. However, after Hassan al-Turabi, the speaker of parliament, introduced a bill to reduce the president's powers, prompting Omar al-Bashir to dissolve parliament and declare a state of emergency, a split began to form inside the organisation. Reportedly, Hassan al-Turabi was suspended as Chairman of National Congress Party after he urged a boycott of the President's re-election campaign. Then, a splinter-faction led by Hassan al-Turabi, the Popular Congress Party (PCP), signed an agreement with Sudan People's Liberation Army (SPLA), one of the largest rebel groups in the country, which led Omar al-Bashir to believe that they were plotting to overthrow him and the government. Hassan al-Turabi was subsequently imprisoned in 2000 on allegations of conspiracy before being released in October 2003.

=== Approving South Sudanese autonomy ===
In 2000, following the Sudanese government approving democratic elections that were boycotted by the opposition, it merged with the Alliance of Working Peoples' Forces Party of former President Gaafar Nimeiry. This merger later disintegrated with the launch of the Sudanese Socialist Democratic Union (SSDU). The utility of the elections was questioned due to their boycotting by the Democratic Unionist Party (DUP) and the National Umma Party (NUP). At the legislative elections, held between 13–23 December 2000, the party won 355 out of 360 seats. At the presidential elections of the same year, its candidate Omar al-Bashir was re-elected with 86.5% of the popular vote. NCP members continued to dominate the Lawyers' Union and heads of most of Sudan's agricultural and university student unions. Following the Comprehensive Peace Agreement with the Sudan People's Liberation Movement (SPLM) in 2005, the NCP-dominated government of Sudan allowed Southern Sudan autonomy for six years, to be followed by a referendum on independence in 2011, thus ending the Second Sudanese Civil War. South Sudan voted in favour of secession.

=== War in Darfur ===
Since the outbreak of the War in Darfur in 2004 between the government of Omar al-Bashir and rebel groups such as the Sudan Liberation Movement/Army (SLM/A) and the Justice and Equality Movement (JEM), the NCP has been almost universally criticised for allegedly, however not officially, supporting Arab militias such as the Janjaweed through a campaign of murder, rape and deportation against the militants as well as the local population. Because of the guerrilla warfare in the Darfur region, between 200,000 and 400,000 people have been killed, while over 2.5 million people have been displaced and the diplomatic relations between Sudan and Chad has never been worse. This has led to the International Criminal Court (ICC) indicting State Minister for Humanitarian Affairs Ahmed Haroun and alleged Muslim Janjawid militia leader Ali Mohammed Ali, also known as Ali Kushayb, in relation to the atrocities in the region. On 14 July 2008, ten criminal charges were announced against President Omar al-Bashir, and subsequently. a warrant for his arrest was issued. As of June 2019, Omar al-Bashir, Ahmed Haroun and Abdel Rahim Mohammed Hussein, also a member of the NCP and indicted by the ICC, were held under detention by Sudanese authorities while the Transitional Military Council held power. Ali Kushayb and Abdallah Banda, also indicted by the ICC, remained fugitives as of June 2019.

=== 2010 election ===
Despite his international arrest warrant, President Omar al-Bashir remained the leader of the NCP and its candidate in the elections held between 11–15 April 2010, the first election with multiple political parties participating in ten years. His political rival was Vice President Salva Kiir, who was also a leader of the Sudan People's Liberation Army (SPLA) and subsequently became President of South Sudan. As a result, the NCP won 324 out of 450 seats in the legislative elections and its candidate Omar al-Bashir was re-elected with 68.24% of the popular vote in the presidential elections.

=== Downfall ===
Mass demonstrations began on 19 December 2018 and ultimately ousted Omar al-Bashir on 11 April 2019. After a transitional government came into power in November, it passed a decree that placed a 10-year ban on political activities for the NCP, confiscated its properties and assets, and removed its members from public institutions.

== Electoral history ==
=== Presidential elections ===
Election	Candidate	Votes	%	Result
2000	Omar al-Bashir		86.5%	Elected ✓
2010	Omar al-Bashir	6,901,694	68.24%	Elected ✓
2015	Omar al-Bashir	5,252,478	94.05%	Elected ✓

=== National Assembly elections ===
Election	Leader	Votes	%	Seats	+/–	Position	Result
2000	Omar al-Bashir			355 / 360	New	1st	Supermajority government
2010	Omar al-Bashir			324 / 450	▼31	1st	Supermajority government
2015	Omar al-Bashir	3,915,590	78.32%	323 / 426	▼1	1st	Supermajority government

=== Southern Sudan Legislative Assembly elections ===
Election	Leader	Votes	%	Seats	+/–	Position	Result
2010	Omar al-Bashir			1 / 170	New	3rd	Minority

== See also ==
- List of Arab nationalist parties
- List of Islamic political parties
- Sudan People's Liberation Movement
- National Islamic Front
- Sudanese Socialist Union
