= 1989 Sudanese coup d'état =

Military overthrow of Prime Minister Sadiq al-Mahdi

- Part of the Second Sudanese Civil War
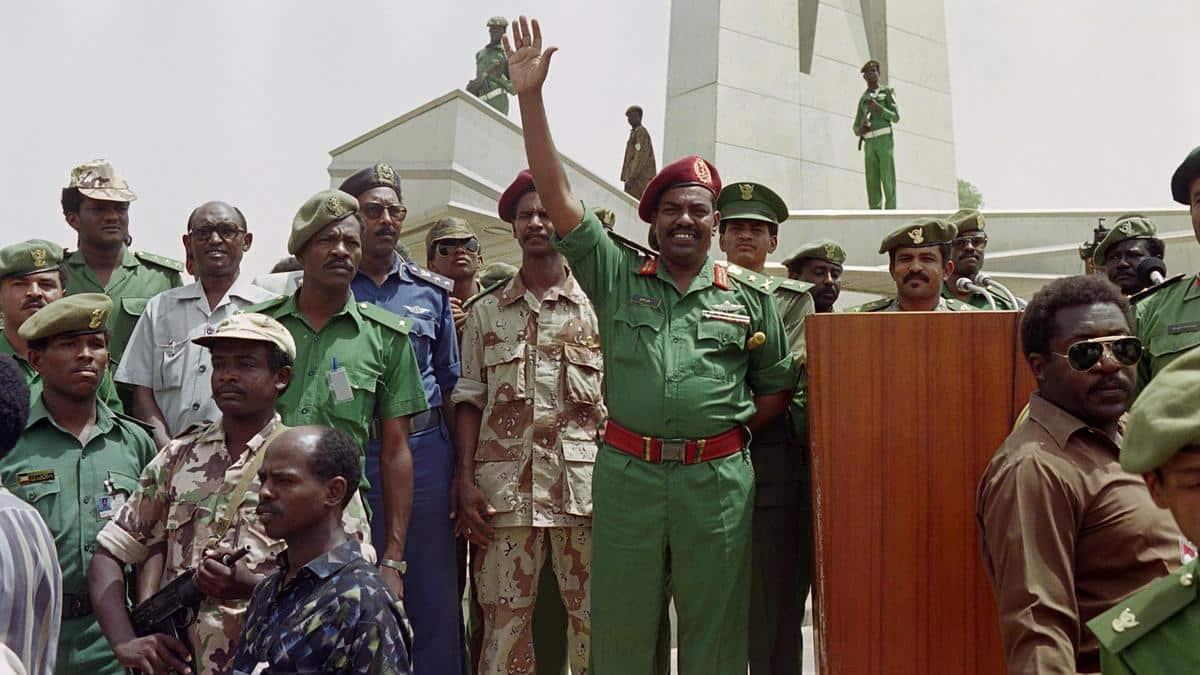
- Omar al-Bashir (centre) and Abdel Rahim Mohammed Hussein (blue fatigue) in front of the Republican Palace after the coup
Date	30 June 1989
Location	Khartoum, Sudan 15°30′2″N 32°33′36″E
Result	Coup attempt succeeds; Overthrow of democratically elected government; Establishment of Revolutionary Command Council for National Salvation

Belligerents
Sudan; Democratic Unionist Party; Umma Party	Sudanese Armed Forces; National Islamic Front; Supported by: Libya

Commanders and leaders
Ahmed al-Mirghani; Sadiq al-Mahdi	Omar al-Bashir; Hassan al-Turabi

Units involved
10,000–15,000	~100 officers

Strength
Unknown	Unknown
- Location within Sudan.

A bloodless coup d'état in Sudan overthrew the democratically elected government of Prime Minister Sadiq al-Mahdi and President Ahmed al-Mirghani on 30 June 1989, ending Sudan's third democratic era. Carried out by a faction of the Sudanese Armed Forces heavily infiltrated and directed by the National Islamic Front (NIF), the coup was led by Brigadier General Omar al-Bashir and architected by Islamist ideologue Hassan al-Turabi, establishing a totalitarian military-religious regime that ruled the country for the next 30 years until its overthrow in 2019.

== Background ==
Following the restoration of civilian rule in 1986, Sudan was paralyzed by extreme economic deterioration and the escalating human cost of the Second Sudanese Civil War against the Sudan People's Liberation Army (SPLA) in the south. By 1989, the number of civilian casualties resulting from conflict-induced famine was estimated to be as high as 250,000.

The political establishment in Khartoum was deeply divided on how to end the war. Prime Minister Sadiq al-Mahdi led a fragile coalition government that was incrementally moving toward a peace agreement with the SPLA. This proposed peace plan explicitly required the freezing of the "September Laws" – the strict interpretation of Sharia imposed nationwide by former president Gaafar Nimeiry in 1983. The prospect of secularizing the state apparatus enraged the National Islamic Front (NIF), a highly organized Islamist political machine led by Hassan al-Turabi. To prevent the revocation of Islamic law, the NIF systematically recruited and cultivated a loyal cadre of mid-ranking officers within the Sudanese Armed Forces.

The immediate catalyst for the military intervention was a legislative deadline. Following months of political paralysis and ultimatums from the military command, Sadiq al-Mahdi initialed draft legislation to suspend the September Laws on 19 June 1989. The bill was scheduled to be presented to parliament for enactment on 1 July, and the prime minister planned to fly to Addis Ababa on 4 July to finalize the peace conference with SPLA leader John Garang. Recognizing that the legal foundation of their Islamic state was about to be dismantled, the NIF and Brigadier al-Bashir executed their coup during the night of 30 June to preempt the parliamentary vote.

== The coup ==
On 30 June 1989, NIF-aligned military officers under the command of Brigadier Omar al-Bashir seized control of Khartoum in a bloodless operation. They quickly arrested the highest echelons of the civilian government, including Sadiq al-Mahdi, claiming their intervention was necessary to save the country from the paralyzing factionalism of "rotten political parties."

To obscure the deeply ideological and Islamist nature of the coup in its early days, Turabi orchestrated a deliberate campaign of tactical dissimulation. He allowed himself and his lieutenants to be arrested and sent to a minimal security cell in Kobar prison alongside their political rivals. This charade successfully created the illusion for the urban populace and foreign diplomats that the new military junta was politically neutral and impartial. In reality, the NIF and the military faction operated in strict tandem.

That same day, Al-Bashir dissolved the civilian administration and established the Revolutionary Command Council for National Salvation (RCCNS). Al-Bashir was declared head of state, Prime Minister, Defense Minister, and Commander-in-chief of the armed forces. While the RCCNS consisted of inexperienced military officers, the actual power and strategic direction of the state were wielded by a shadowy civilian advisory body known as the "Council of Defenders of the Revolution" (or the "Committee of Forty"). Controlled by prominent Islamists and chaired by Turabi's deputy, Ali Osman Taha, this council ensured the military adhered to the fundamentalist mission.

== Aftermath ==
The coup permanently dismantled the fragile democratic system established in 1985. Under the total ideological control of the NIF, the RCCNS banned all political parties, trade unions, and secular civil society institutions, and suspended the Sudanese Bar Association. A constitution was created in 1998 during the regime.

To secure the new totalitarian order, the regime radically restructured the state's apparatus of repression. The internal security portfolio was handed to General Bakri Hassan Salih, who established the Internal Security-Security of the Revolution (IS-SOR). Staffed by NIF zealots, the IS-SOR bypassed traditional law enforcement and became infamous for utilizing clandestine detention centers known as "Ghost Houses," where political opponents were subjected to ruthless interrogation, torture, and extrajudicial killings. Concurrently, more than 78,000 individuals were purged from the army, police, and civil administration to ensure absolute loyalty to the Islamist project.

Distrustful of the regular Sudanese army – which the NIF considered too "secularized" and professional to fight a religious war – the government established the Popular Defence Forces (PDF). This paramilitary organization, heavily indoctrinated with jihadist ideology by NIF clerics, served as a parallel ideological militia to protect the regime from internal dissent and to act as shock troops against the non-Muslim insurgents in the southern civil war. Bolstered by an alliance with Iran and arms purchases from China, the regime utilized these forces to aggressively escalate the conflict.

The totalitarian regime consolidated by Al-Bashir and Turabi presided over decades of intense conflict, leading to severe war crimes and human rights violations. Al-Bashir was ultimately indicted by the International Criminal Court, which has sought his extradition since 2008 on charges of genocide, war crimes, and crimes against humanity primarily related to the Darfur Genocide.

Following 30 years of autocratic rule and months of intense civilian protests, Al-Bashir's regime was removed from power in another military intervention on 11 April 2019.

== See also ==
- Revolutionary Command Council for National Salvation
- National Islamic Front

== Sources ==
- Burr, J. Millard; Collins, Robert O. (2003). Revolutionary Sudan: Hasan al-Turabi and the Islamist State, 1989–2000. Leiden: Brill. ISBN 978-90-04-13196-5.
- Cowell, Alan (1 July 1989). "Military Coup in Sudan Ousts Civilian Regime". The New York Times.
