= 2019 Sudanese coup d'état =

Military overthrow of President Omar al-Bashir

- Part of the Sudanese Revolution
Date	11 April 2019
Location	Khartoum, Sudan 15°30′2″N 32°33′36″E
Result	Military coup successful, protests continue: Omar al-Bashir removed from power; National Legislature dissolved; State of emergency imposed for three months; Constitution suspended; Transitional Military Council established; Protesters denounce military government; Transition Agreement reached between protestors and military government

Belligerents
Government of Sudan	Sudanese Armed Forces

Commanders and leaders
Omar al-Bashir	Ahmed Awad Ibn Auf

Casualties and losses
- 11 killed
- Location within Sudan

A coup d'état overthrew President Omar al-Bashir and his three-decade authoritarian regime in Sudan on 11 April 2019, after months of widespread popular protests demanding his departure. Led by Defense Minister Lieutenant General Ahmed Awad Ibn Auf, the high command of the Sudanese Armed Forces dissolved the National Legislature, suspended the constitution, and declared a three-month state of emergency, before ultimately agreeing to a power-sharing arrangement with civilian forces that paved the way for a transitional government.

== Background ==
President Omar al-Bashir had ruled Sudan since taking power in the 1989 Sudanese coup d'état, presiding over an authoritarian regime characterized by severe political repression, Islamist policies, and international isolation, including his indictment by the International Criminal Court for war crimes in Darfur. Sudan's economy suffered a massive structural blow following the secession of South Sudan in 2011, which deprived Khartoum of crucial oil revenues. By late 2018, the country faced soaring inflation reaching nearly 70%, severe currency devaluation, and chronic shortages of cash, fuel, and basic goods. The crisis was further compounded in August 2018 when the ruling National Congress Party announced its intention to back al-Bashir for another presidential term in the 2020 elections, defying constitutional term limits and angering an already disillusioned public.

On 19 December 2018, the abrupt tripling of bread prices and the removal of wheat and fuel subsidies triggered spontaneous riots in the city of Atbara, which rapidly spread to the capital, Khartoum, and other major urban centers. Initially driven by economic grievances, the demonstrations rapidly morphed into a nationwide popular uprising – later known as the Sudanese Revolution. Protesters redirected their demands toward the immediate resignation of al-Bashir and his entire government. In an attempt to crush the escalating civil disobedience, al-Bashir declared a one-year state of national emergency in February 2019, dissolving the central and regional cabinets and replacing civilian governors with military and intelligence officers. However, the heavy-handed security crackdown failed to deter the demonstrators, culminating in the massive April sit-ins outside the military headquarters that ultimately precipitated the coup.

== Coup d'état and aftermath ==
On 11 April 2019, the Sudanese military removed Omar al-Bashir from his position as President of Sudan, dissolved the cabinet and the National Legislature, and announced a three-month state of emergency, to be followed by a two-year transition period. Lt. Gen. Ahmed Awad Ibn Auf, who was both the defense minister of Sudan and the Vice President of Sudan, declared himself the de facto Head of State. He announced the suspension of the country's constitution and imposed a strict curfew, effectively ordering the dissolution of the ongoing protests. Along with the national government, state governments and regional legislative councils were systematically dissolved.

State media reported that all political prisoners, including anti-Bashir protest leaders, were being released from jail. Al-Bashir's National Congress Party responded by announcing that they would hold a rally supporting the ousted president. In retaliation, soldiers raided the offices of the Islamic Movement, the main ideological wing of the ruling party, in Khartoum.

The following day, facing intense pressure, the ruling military government agreed to shorten the length of its rule and transfer control to a civilian authority if negotiations were successful. That evening, Auf stepped down as head of the military council following protests over his decision not to extradite Bashir to the International Criminal Court. He was succeeded by Lt. Gen. Abdel Fattah Abdelrahman Burhan, the general inspector of the armed forces, a move celebrated as a "triumph" by the overjoyed protestors. Burhan was considered to have a cleaner record than the rest of al-Bashir's generals and was not implicated in war crimes.

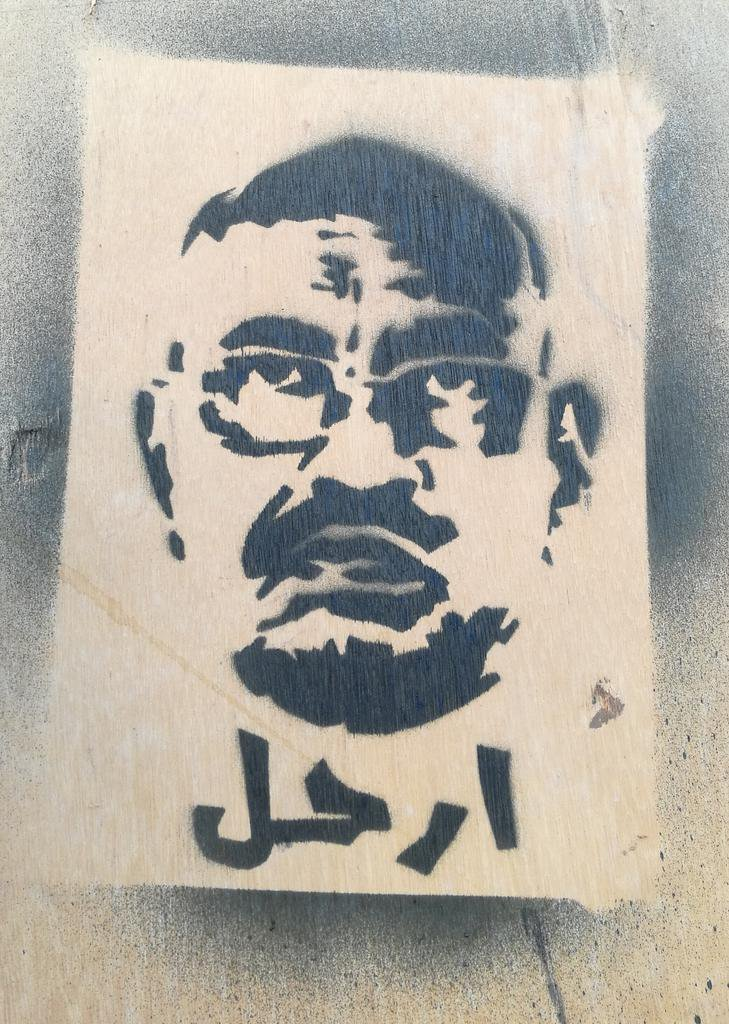
Anti-Omar al-Bashir revolutionary street stencil in Khartoum which reads "Leave" in Arabic.

Despite the imposed curfew, protesters remained on the streets. Shortly after taking power, Burhan lifted the curfew, ordered the release of prisoners jailed under Bashir's emergency laws, and accepted the resignation of intelligence and security chief Salah Gosh, who had overseen the violent crackdown on protestors. Following these concessions, talks to transition to a civilian government officially began.

In subsequent statements, several Sudanese activists, including the Sudanese Professionals Association and the Sudanese Communist Party, denounced the Transitional Military Council as a continuation of the old regime, demanding an immediate handover to civilians. By mid-April, the military council agreed to allow protesters to nominate a civilian Prime Minister and run every government ministry except for Defense and Interior. The military council also announced a restructuring of the armed forces and intelligence services, formally barring the former ruling National Congress Party from participating in the transitional government.

The African Union intervened shortly after the coup, initially giving Sudan 15 days to install a civilian government under threat of suspension, a deadline later extended to three months. Concurrently, to appease the opposition, the military sacked the nation's top prosecutors and saw the resignation of several controversial generals from the political committee.

Internationally, while western powers and supranational organizations condemned the coup or urged a democratic transition, the ouster of al-Bashir and the establishment of the military council were quickly welcomed by Saudi Arabia and the United Arab Emirates, who pledged immediate economic aid to the new regime.

On 3 June 2019, negotiations collapsed in bloodshed when the Rapid Support Forces (RSF) and other state troops violently tore apart a sit-in camp in Khartoum. Dozens of women were raped by security forces and at least 87 people were killed in the massacre.

== Fate of al-Bashir and his allies ==
After being detained, al-Bashir was initially placed under house arrest under heavy guard; his personal bodyguard was dismissed. The military government stated it would seek to prosecute al-Bashir domestically, refusing to extradite him to The Hague to face the International Criminal Court (ICC) charges for crimes against humanity and war crimes in connection with the Darfur genocide.

In the weeks following the coup, more than 100 of al-Bashir's political and military allies were systematically arrested. This included Prime Minister Mohamed Taher Ayala, former vice presidents Bakri Hassan Saleh and Ali Othman Taha, and prominent ICC fugitives like Ahmed Haroun and former defense minister Abdel Rahim Mohammed Hussein.

In mid-April, al-Bashir was transferred from the presidential palace to Khartoum's Kobar Maximum Security Prison. He was reported to be surrounded by tight security and held in solitary confinement in the same facility where he had imprisoned his political opponents for decades. During subsequent raids on his home, authorities located suitcases loaded with around $6.7 million in cash. Arrests of Bashir-era officials, including leaders of the Islamic movement and former state governors, continued into May 2019.

== Agreement reached on transition government and constitution ==
Despite the brutal crackdown in June, diplomatic efforts resumed. In July 2019, a power-sharing deal was agreed upon between the TMC and the civilian protesters, represented by the Forces of Freedom and Change (FFC). The written agreement was formally signed in mid-July. The two factions announced they would run Sudan via executive and legislative institutions and launch a judicial investigation into post-coup events, including the Khartoum massacre, until general elections could be held in 2022. The deal mandated that the leadership of the sovereign council be transferred from a military to a civilian leader midway through the 39-month transitional period.

In August 2019, terms concerning a transitional government were finalized. Opposition leader Ahmed Rabie and Gen Mohamed Hamdan Dagalo officially signed the Constitutional Declaration, ensuring that a joint council of six civilians and five military officials would lead the Sudanese government.

== In popular culture ==
- Sudan, Remember Us, a 2024 documentary film directed by Hind Meddeb
