= Mirghani =

Mirghani or al-Mirghani (Arabic: الميرغني) can be a given name, a middle name, or a surname. Notable people with the name include:

== Given name ==
- Mirghani Alnasri, Sudanee politician
- Mirghani Al Zain (born 1978), Sudanese-born Qatari football midfielder and coach

== Middle name ==
- Mohammed Uthman al-Mirghani al-Khatim (1793–1852), Mecca-born founder of the Khatmiyya sufi tariqa

== Surname ==
- Ahmed al-Mirghani (1941–2008), former president of Sudan
- Ali al-Mirghani (c. 1873 – 1968), Sudanese politician and Islamic leader
- Ibrahim al-Mirghani (born 1982), Sudanese politician
- Mohamed Osman al-Mirghani (born 1936), Sudanese politician and Islamic leader
- Suzannah Mirghani, Qatar-based filmmaker

== See also ==
- Al Mirghani ESC, football club based in Kassala, Sudan
- Al-Mahdi and al-Mirghani rivalry, former sectarian feud in Anglo-Egyptian Sudan
