= Sudan Self-Government Statute =

1953 agreement in Sudan

The Sudan Self-Government Statute of 1953 was a step towards Sudan's independence, granting the territory internal self-government while still under Anglo-Egyptian colonial rule.

== Background ==
After the defeat of the Mahdist State in 1899, Sudan came under a de jure condominium of the British Empire, and the Kingdom of Egypt, in which Britain had de facto control over Sudan.

In the 1910s up to the 1924 White Flag League Revolt, nationalism emerged in Sudan and Sudanese graduates of Gordon Memorial College formed the Graduates' Club on 18 May 1918, which wanted to restrict the Governor-General of Sudan's power and to obtain Sudanese participation in the council's deliberations. However, any change in government required a change in the condominium agreement. Neither Britain nor Egypt would agree to a modification. After the 1924 revolt was crushed, Sudanese educated elites shifted their focus to cultural and intellectual activities.

In the 1930s, nationalism reemerged in Sudan, culminating in the formation of the Graduates' General Congress (GGC) on 12 February 1938. The GGC worked to mobilise public support for Sudanese independence, organising strikes and protests to pressure the British government to grant greater autonomy to Sudan. On 3 April 1942, amid global shifts like the publication of the Atlantic Charter, the Congress presented twelve demands to the government, including a call for Sudan's right to self-determination after the World War II and end to the "Closed-door" ordinances for southern Sudan. These demands were rejected, leading to division in the GGC, influenced by the Khatmiyya and Ansar.

Nationalists and religious leaders were divided on the issue of whether Sudan should apply for independence or union with Egypt. The Mahdi's son, Abd al-Rahman al-Mahdi, emerged as a spokesman for independence in opposition to Ali al Mirghani, the Khatmiyyah leader, who favoured union with Egypt. Coalitions supported by these leaders formed rival wings of the nationalist movement. Later, radical nationalists and the Khatmiyyah created the Ashigga, renamed the National Unionist Party (NUP), to advance the cause of Sudanese-Egyptian unification. The moderates favoured Sudanese independence in cooperation with Britain and together with the Ansar established the Umma Party.

In 1948, the pro-Egyptian NUP boycotted the parliamentary election. As a result, pro-independence Umma Party groups dominated the Legislative Assembly. In December 1950, a member of the Umma tabled a resolution asking the Governor-General to demand that Egypt and Britain grant Sudan independence at once. The British strongly opposed the measure.

In 1952, leaders of the Umma-dominated legislature negotiated the Self-Determination Agreement with Britain. The draft agreement was sent to Egypt in May 1952, but Cairo, which demanded recognition of Egyptian sovereignty over Sudan, repudiated the condominium agreement in protest and declared its reigning monarch, Faruk, King of Egypt and the Sudan. Later that year, on n 23 July 1952, Farouk was toppled by the Free Officers Movement, who supported Sudan independence.

The statue was debated in the Parliament of the United Kingdom on 22 October 1952, and on 20 January 1953 after Egypt approved the agreement. During this time, Abdul Rahman al-Mahdi, Imam of the Ansar, became Chief Minister of Sudan on 22 October 1952.

== The statue ==
The Self-Government Statute was signed on 12 February 1953, in Cairo, and enacted on 21 March 1953. It allowed for a three-year transition period from condominium rule to self-government. It established a Council of Ministers and a parliament, paving the way for a more autonomous Sudan. The Statute also included a bill of rights, a first for a territory under British dominion. The new Sudanese government had responsibility in all areas except military and foreign affairs, which remained in the British Governor-General of Sudan's hands.

Prior to the implementation of self-government, a parliamentary elections were held between 2 and 25 November 1953, which was won by the NUP (51 of the 97 seats). Sudan then started the process of Sudanisation of the civil service. The legislators then enacted a constitution that provided for a prime minister and council of ministers responsible to a bicameral parliament, and Ismail al-Azhari, leader of the NUP, became Chief Minister of Sudan on 6 January 1954.

As mandated by the statute, in 1954, the Governor-General of Sudan formed a Commission of the Sudan consisting of a Chairman from Pakistan, a representative of the Egyptian government and another for the British, along with two Sudanese members. The two Sudanese members were initially appointed by agreement between the British and Egyptian Governments, with their appointments subject to approval by the Sudanese Parliament. However, one of the two appointed Sudanese members from the pro-independence Umma Party was not approved by the NUP-dominated parliament in April 1954, continuing the long rivalry between the Khatmiyya and Ansar religious sects.

== Sudan's independence ==
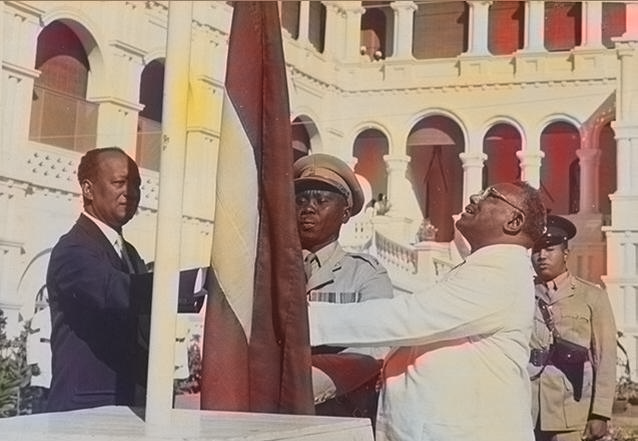
Sudan's flag was raised at the independence ceremony by the Prime Minister Isma'il Alazhari and opposition leader Muhammad Ahmad Mahgoub on 1 January 1956.

On 19 December 1955, the Sudanese parliament, under al-Azhari's leadership, unanimously adopted a declaration of independence effective on 1 January. Both Egypt and Britain recognised Sudan sovereignty. The Governor-General of Sudan commission was adopted into Supreme Commission. The statue was modified into the Transitional Constitution of Sudan; however, political factions had yet to reach a consensus on a permanent constitutional framework.
