= Jaafar M. H. Elmirghani =

Academic in communication networks

Professor Jaafar M. H. Elmirghani IEEE Fellow, FREng, FInstP FIET
- Elmirghani in 2015
- Born: Sudan
- Education: University of Khartoum (BSc) University of Huddersfield (PhD) University of Leeds (DSc)
- Occupations: Engineer and professor
- Known for: Communication networks and systems

Jaafar Mohamed Hashim Elmirghani is a Sudanese-British engineer specialising in communication networks and systems. He is a Professor of Communication Networks and Systems at King's College London.. His research has focused on energy-efficient communications, optical and wireless networks, and data-centre networking. He is a Fellow of the Institute of Electrical and Electronics Engineers (IEEE) and was elected a Fellow of the Royal Academy of Engineering in 2025.

== Early life and education ==
Elmirghani was born in Sudan and moved to England in 1991. He received a Bachelor of Science degree in Electrical Engineering from the University of Khartoum in 1989 and a PhD from the University of Huddersfield in 1994. His doctoral research concerned synchronisation of optical systems and optical receiver design. In 2012, he was awarded a Doctor of Science (DSc) in Communication Systems and Networks by the University of Leeds.

== Academic and professional career ==
Elmirghani was Chair in Optical Communications at the University of Wales Swansea from 2000 to 2007. During this period, he established the Communications and Photonics Group and became head of Swansea's Institute of Advanced Telecommunications. In 2007, Elmirghani joined the University of Leeds as Professor of Communication Networks and Systems. At Leeds, his research included energy-efficient communication networks, optical communications, network optimisation and data-centre systems. He also served as Director of the Institute of Communication and Power Networks. In 2022, Elmirghani joined King's College London as Professor of Communication Networks and Systems.

In 2020, Elmirghani was an expert contributor to the Royal Society project Carbon emissions from digital systems: what’s the evidence?, which examined evidence concerning the environmental impact of digital technologies.

During a visit to King Abdulaziz University from December 2011 to January 2012, Elmirghani delivered scientific lectures, discussed student-exchange and joint-research opportunities in communications, and worked with university faculty on proposals for a communications and networking research group.

== Research ==
Elmirghani's research has addressed the energy consumption and performance of communication networks and computing infrastructure. His work has included optical networks, wireless communications, data-centre networks, network optimisation and energy-efficient computing.

Elmirghani has published over 600 technical papers and supervised over 75 PhD students and was awarded over £50m in research grants.

He has led and participated in research projects funded by the UK Engineering and Physical Sciences Research Council (EPSRC). These include the Intelligent Energy Aware Networks (INTERNET) project, and the Terabit Bidirectional Multi-user Optical Wireless System (TOWS) programme, and The Intelligent Networked Airport (TINA) project.

In 2008, The Daily Telegraph reported on an intelligent-road research project led by Elmirghani at the University of Leeds, involving vehicle-to-vehicle and vehicle-to-infrastructure communications for improving road safety and traffic management.

== Awards and honours ==
Elmirghani has received awards from professional organisations for his work in communication networks and energy-efficient communications. He received the IEEE Communications Society Transmission, Access and Optical Systems (TAOS) Outstanding Technical Achievement Award in 2020 for contributions to the energy efficiency of optical communication systems and networks, and the TAOS Outstanding Service Award in 2015 for leadership and contributions to green communications. He received the IEEE Communications Society Signal Processing and Communication Electronics Outstanding Service Award in 2009. He also received the IEEE Communications Society Harold Sobol Award for Exemplary Service in 2005. In 2016, Elmirghani received an IET Premium Award for a paper published in IET Optoelectronics and an Edison Award for his work on GreenTouch innovations. In 2015, he received the GreenTouch 1000x Award for pioneering research contributions to energy efficiency in telecommunications.

Elmirghani is also a Fellow of the Institution of Engineering and Technology (IET) and a Fellow of the Institute of Physics.

He was elected Fellow of the IEEE in 2021 for contributions to energy-efficient communications and Fellow of the Royal Academy of Engineering in 2025 for contributions to the energy efficiency and sustainability of communication and computing systems.

== Standards development ==
Elmirghani has chaired the IEEE Energy Efficient ICT Working Group within the IEEE Communications Society's Green ICT Standards Committee and has chaired the IEEE Sustainable ICT standards initiative. Under these initiatives, the working group has developed a series of IEEE standards addressing energy-efficient networking and computing, including dynamic line-rate transmission, distributed big-data processing, virtualised data-centre orchestration, virtual machine placement, and content distribution.

== Entrepreneurship ==
In 2020, Elmirghani founded Ultracell Networks Ltd, a University of Leeds spin-off company developing energy-efficient optical networking technologies for cloud and edge data centres. The company originated from research conducted at the University of Leeds.

== Family and ancestry ==
Jaafar M. H. Elmirghani is a member of the Al-Mirghani family, a prominent Sudanese religious and political family associated with the Khatmiyya Sufi order. The family traces its lineage to Mohammed Uthman al-Mirghani al-Khatim, the founder of the Khatmiyya.

Among the prominent members of the family are Sir Sayyid Ali al-Mirghani, a religious and political leader, who was awarded the Companion of the Order of St Michael and St George in 1900, and Knight Commander of the Order of St Michael and St George in 1916, and Knight Commander of the Royal Victorian Order in 1919, Ahmed al-Mirghani, who served as President of Sudan from 1986 to 1989, Mohamed Osman al-Mirghani, a Sudanese religious and political figure associated with the Khatmiyya Sufi order, and several muftis of Mekkah including Abdullah Al-Mirghani the renowned mufti of Mekkah, died 1857.
