= Mohamed Osman al-Mirghani =

Sudanese politician and Islamic leader (1936–2026)

Sayyid Mohamed Osman al-Mirghani
- محمد عثمان الميرغني
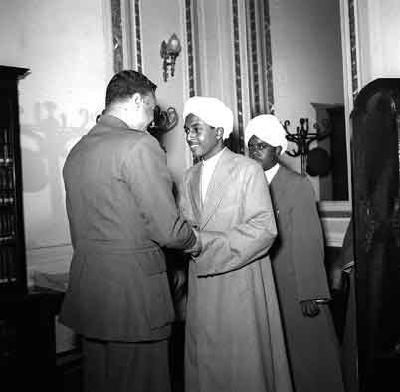
- Al-Mirghani (middle) with Gamal Abdel Nasser (left) and Ahmed al-Mirghani (right) in the 1960s

Personal life
- Born: 1936 Khartoum North, Anglo-Egyptian Sudan
- Died: 13 November 2026 (aged 90) Cairo, Egypt
- Political party: People's Democratic Party (until 1969); Democratic Unionist Party (1969–2026)

Religious life
- Religion: Khatmiyya (Sunni Islam)
- Lineage: Al-Mirghani family

Sayyid Mohamed Osman al-Mirghani (Arabic: محمد عثمان الميرغني; 1936 – 13 November 2026) was a Sudanese politician, and leader of the Khatmiyya Sufi order and the Democratic Unionist Party (DUP).

== Early life ==
Mohamed Osman al-Mirghani was born in Hilla Hamad district in Khartoum North in 1936, into a notable political and religious family that had headed the Khatmiyya, Sudan's largest Sufi order, for generations. He was named after his grandfather, Mohammed Uthman, who founded the Khatmiyya order.

== Political career ==
Al-Mirghani became Khatmiyyat and the People's Democratic Party (PDP) leader after the death of his father Ali al-Mirghani in 1968. In December of the previous year, he reunited with Ismail al-Azhari in the presence of King Faisal of Saudi Arabia to end the division between the National Unionist Party and the PDP under the Democratic Unionist Party (DUP), which was subsequently led by al-Azhari, while al-Mirghani was made a sponsor of the party. Sharif Hussein al-Hindi became the DUP leader after al-Azhari's death in 1969, and al-Mirghani became the leader after al-Hindi's death in 1982. He refrained from holding any official government positions, preferring the role of political mediator.

Following the 1985 coup d'état, the DUP placed second in the 1986 Sudanese parliamentary election and formed a coalition government with their historical rival, the National Umma Party, led by Sadiq al-Mahdi, with al-Mirghani's youngest brother Ahmed becoming the President of Sudan.

In November 1988, al-Mirghani met the Sudan People's Liberation Movement's leader John Garang in Addis Ababa to forge a peace agreement to stop the Second Sudanese Civil War. This led to the signing of the Mirghani–Garang Agreement on 16 November, which proposed a ceasefire, suspension of the September Laws, and political action to overcome the country's constitutional crisis. When al-Mahdi objected to the agreement, the DUP withdrew from his coalition. The agreement was further complicated by the 1989 coup d'état by military officer Omar al-Bashir and Hassan al-Turabi, leader of the National Islamic Front, and was ultimately never implemented. Following the coup, the DUP was banned, and al-Mirghani arrested, initially being held at Kober prison in Khartoum before being placed under house arrest in November 1989 and released by February 1990.

Upon his release, al-Mirghani left for Cairo and the DUP joined the National Democratic Alliance (NDA), an umbrella anti-Bashir coalition. Al-Mirghani became chairman of the NDA, which under his leadership approved an armed insurrection against al-Bashir in 1995. However, after the Comprehensive Peace Agreement was passed, ending the Second Sudanese Civil War, he signed a reconciliation agreement with al-Bashir's government on 18 June 2005, with Ali Osman Taha signing on behalf of Khartoum. In 2011, the DUP joined al-Bashir's coalition.

Al-Mirghani left Sudan for London in 2013 after disagreements within his party, then left it to settle in Cairo. In 2014, he received Sudan's Order of the Republic from al-Bashir.

In March 2022, he introduced an initiative to resolve Sudan's political crisis through dialogue. On 22 November 2022, after the 2019 revolution and Sudan's transition to democracy, Egyptian President Abdel Fattah el-Sisi issued a decision to transfer al-Mirghani, the head of the Sudanese DUP, from Cairo to Sudan on a private plane, ending a voluntary exile in Egypt. Upon his return, al-Mirghani was received by tens of thousands of his sect followers. He returned to Cairo the following year.

During the Sudanese civil war, al-Mirghani supported the Sudanese Armed Forces against the Rapid Support Forces.

== Death ==
Al-Mirghani died on 13 November 2026 at Cleopatra Hospital in Cairo, at the age of 90. His body was flown to Khartoum International Airport on 16 November, where a military funeral took place with senior officials Malik Agar, Kamil Idris, and a number of other ministers in attendance. His body was then driven in an ambulance to the Mosque of Sayyid Ali Al-Mirghani in Khartoum North, where he was buried.
