= Ibrahim al-Mirghani =

Sudanese politician (born 1982)

- إبراهيم الميرغني

Minister of State of Ministry of Communications and Information Technology
- In office 11 May 2017 – 2018
- Nominated by: The Government of National Accord

Personal details
- Born: 1982 (age 43–44) Kassala, Sudan
- Party: Democratic Unionist Party (until 2024)
- Education: Cairo University

Ibrahim Ahmed Mohamed Osman al-Mirghani (Arabic: إبراهيم أحمد محمد عثمان الميرغني) is a Sudanese politician and a former Minister of Communications and Information Technology. He is a member of the Democratic Unionist Party.

== Biography ==
Al-Mirghani was born in Kassala in 1982, into the Maraghna family. He obtained his primary school certificate from Hilla Hamad Primary School, he attended Bahri Government School and Blue Nile Secondary School. He obtained his first degree in Economics and Political Science from Cairo University.

=== Political career ===
Al-Mirghani is a member of Democratic Unionist Party (DUP), which was co-founded by his great-grandfather Sayyid Ali al-Mirghani. He served as a one term member of the DUP's Executive Office, a member of the Political Bureau, the official spokesman for the DUP before he became the Youngest Minister of State of the Ministry of Communications and Information Technology on 11 May 2017 at the age of 35.

Al-Mirghani DUP membership was frozen on 4 December 2022, after meeting Hemedti, leader of the Rapid Support Forces (RSF). He was dismissed from the DUP due to internal disputes.

He sided with the RSF in the on-going civil war. He is one of the signatories of the Sudan Founding Alliance, that formed the rival government, Government of Peace and Unity, led by Hemedti.
