= Yusuf al-Ajab =

Sudanese politician

Yusuf al-Ajab (Arabic: يوسف العجب) was a Sudanese politician.

He was born in 1895 at Abu Hashim (Adandar). He obtained elementary education and was dedicated to farming. He was a tribal leader, serving as the Nazir of Rufa'a ash-Sharq. His family dominated politics in Dinder.He was a great man.

During a 1932 famine, he bankrupted himself by providing relief to the starving population in the area, having been reassured that his contributions would be reimbursed later by the government. However, the government did not live up to its commitments. Subsequently, Yusuf al-Ajab was dismissed from his post as nazir. He fasted in protest until he was reinstated as nazir.

He was appointed to the Advisory Council for the Northern Sudan, set up in 1943.

He was elected to the Legislative Assembly in the 1948 Sudanese parliamentary election, from the Funj Nazirate constituency. He was again elected to the House of Representatives from the Funj Nazirates constituency in the 1953 Sudanese parliamentary election, standing as a Socialist Republican Party candidate. A founding member of the Socialist Republican Party, he served as the party chairman. As of the mid-1950s he served as President of the Rufaa ash-Sharq Court. He was a holder of a Special Robe of Honour.

He was named Minister of State without Portfolio in February 1956 in the cabinet of Ismail al-Azhari, and retained this post in the July 1956 cabinet of Abdallah Khalil.

His sons and nephews have continued to dominate Dinder politics. Prominent among his sons are Dr. Mansour Yusuf al-Ajab and Dr. Omar Yusuf al-Ajab.
