= Abdallah Bakr Mustafa =

Sudanese politician

Abdallah Bakr Mustafa (Arabic: عبد الله بكر مصطفى), O.B.E. was a Sudanese officer and politician. He left the army in 1928. After leaving the military he became the nazir of the central Gedaref area. Later he became the nazir of Dar Bakr. During the Second World War Abdallah Bakr led a force of irregulars, nicknamed 'Banda Bakr', fighting on the British side.

In 1944, he was appointed to the Advisory Council for the Northern Sudan. He was one of the indirectly elected members of the Legislative Assembly for the 1948–1953 term. In the 1953 legislative election he was elected to the House of Representatives from Gedaref South as an Umma Party candidate.
