= Sudan Founding Alliance =

Sudan Founding Alliance تحالف السودان التأسيسي
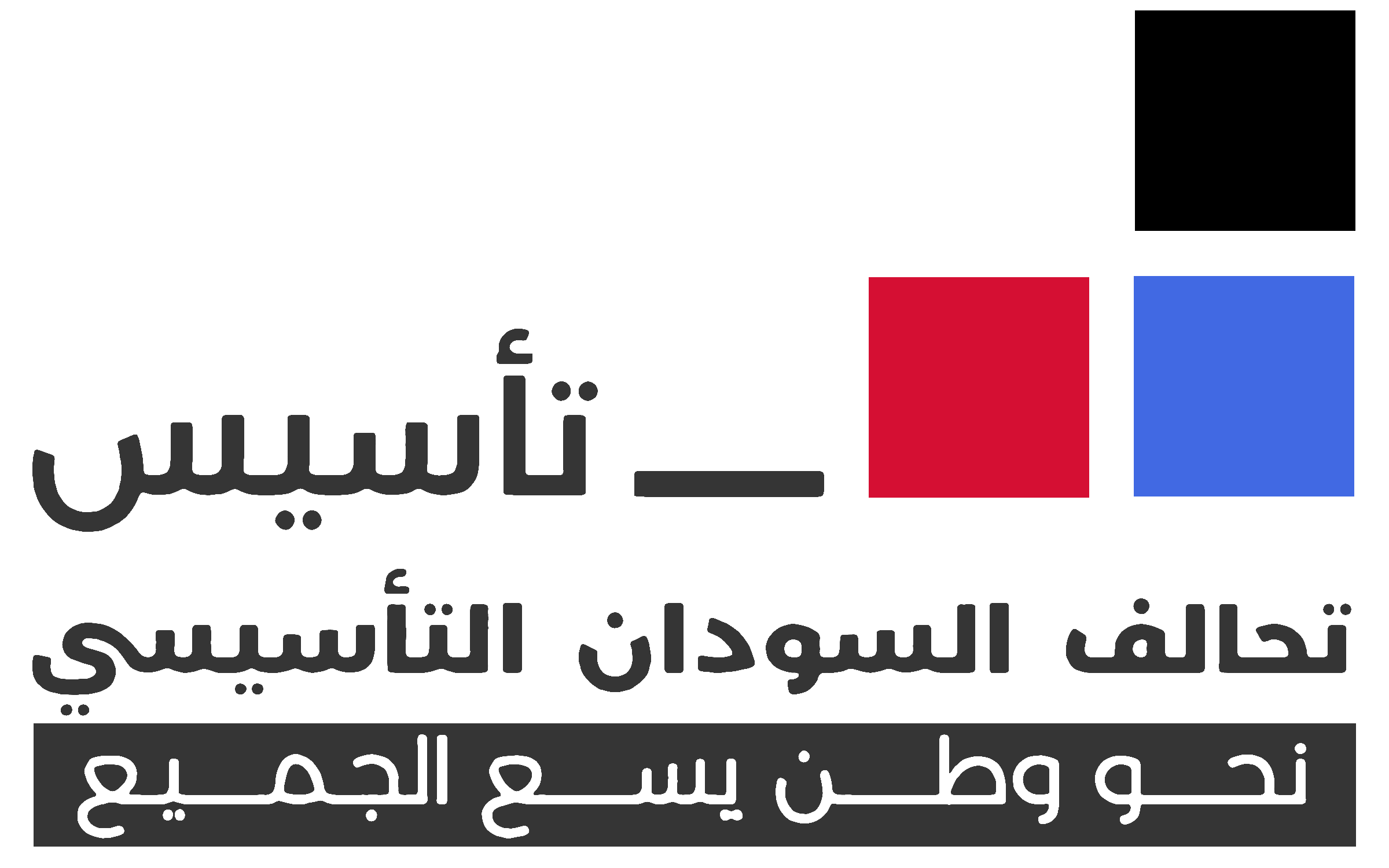
- Abbreviation: Tasis
- Leader: Admiral-General Mohamed Hamdan Dagalo
- Founder: Rapid Support Forces
- Founded: 23 February 2025
- Headquarters: Nyala, South Darfur
- Members: Rapid Support Forces; SPLM–N (al-Hilu); SLM-TC

The Sudan Founding Alliance (Note: Arabic: تحالف السودان التأسيسي, romanized: tahaluf alsuwdan altaasisiu) also known as Tasis or Tasees, (Note: Arabic: تأسيس) is an alliance of Sudanese anti-governmental political factions and paramilitary forces formed in February 2025 during the Sudanese civil war (2023–present).

== Background ==
Following the ousting of longtime president Omar al-Bashir in April 2019, Sudan entered a period of political transition which abruptly ended with a further coup by the Sudanese Armed Forces led by Abdel Fattah al-Burhan in October 2021. A civil war between the Sudanese Armed Forces (SAF) led by al-Burhan and the paramilitary Rapid Support Forces (RSF) led by Mohamed Hamdan Dagalo (Hemedti) broke out in April 2023. As Chairman of the Transitional Sovereignty Council, Al-Burhan announced plans to form a new transitional government and amended Sudan's transitional constitution to remove references to the RSF and the Forces of Freedom and Change in February 2025.

== Sudan Founding Charter ==
=== Drafting ===
The Chairman of the Transitional Sovereignty Council, Abdel Fattah al-Burhan, announced plans for the formation of a civilian led transitional government on 10 February 2025. In response, the RSF held a meeting at the Kenyatta International Convention Centre in Nairobi, Kenya on 18 February 2025 to establish a Sudan Founding Alliance and draft a Sudan Founding Charter to pave the way for the formation of a rival Government of Peace and Unity to administer territory under RSF control. The signing of the charter was later postponed, initially to 21 February 2025 and it was finally signed at 2am on 23 February 2025 at the Edge Convention Centre in Nairobi.

=== Signatories ===
In addition to the Rapid Support Forces, the charter was also supported by 23 political factions including Abdelaziz al-Hilu of the SPLM-N (al-Hilu), Fadlallah Baramah Nasser of the National Umma Party, Al-Hadi Idris of the Sudan Revolutionary Front, and Ibrahim al-Mirghani of the Original Democratic Unionist Party.

The National Umma Party subsequently removed Fadlallah Burma Nasir as its acting leader following him signing the Sudan Founding Charter. However, Nasir rejected his dismissal and ordered the dissolution of the party's Presidential Institution instead.

The Original Democratic Unionist Party also denied signing the Charter and disavowed Ibrahim al-Mirghani.

=== Provisions ===
The charter calls for “a secular, democratic, decentralised state based on freedom, equality, and justice, without bias toward any cultural, ethnic, religious, or regional identity”, and outlines plans for a “new, unified, professional, national army”.

== Transitional constitutional framework ==
On 4 March 2025, the Sudan Founding Alliance announced that it had adopted a transitional constitutional framework at a ceremony held at the Mercure Upper Hill Hotel in Nairobi. The transitional constitutional framework establishes the structure of the Government of Peace and Unity and defines the powers of national, regional and local authorities. It also contains provisions for the division of Sudan into eight administrative regions. Rapid Support Forces leader Mohamed Hamdan Dagalo officially announced the establishment of the Government of Peace and Unity on 15 April 2025.

== Member parties and factions ==
The alliance includes 23 political and military factions including:

- Rapid Support Forces (Janjaweed)
- Sudan People's Liberation Movement–North (al-Hilu)
- National Umma Party (Fadlallah Burma Nasir faction)
- Sudan Liberation Movement/Army (Transitional Council faction)
- Democratic Unionist Party (Ibrahim al-Mirghani faction)
- Justice and Equality Movement (Suleiman Sandal faction)
- Sudan Liberation Forces Alliance

== Leadership ==
A Leadership Council was established on 1 July 2025:

- President: Admiral-General Mohamed Hamdan Dagalo
- Vice-president: Commander Abdelaziz al-Hilu
- Spokesperson: Aladdin Awad Nugud
- Rapporteur: Makin Hamed Tirab

== See also ==
- Government of Peace and Unity
- Tagadum
