= Ajab =

Ajab is a surname. Notable people with the surname include:

- Ahmad Ajab (born 1994), Kuwaiti footballer
- Khalid Ajab (born 1986), Kuwaiti footballer

== See also ==
- Ajab Shir, city in East Azerbaijan Province, Iran
- Yusuf al-Ajab (1895–?), Sudanese politician
