= Ali al-Mirghani =

Sudanese politician and Islamic leader (1873–1968)

Sir Sayyid Ali al-Mirghani CMG, KCMG, KCVO
- علي الميرغني
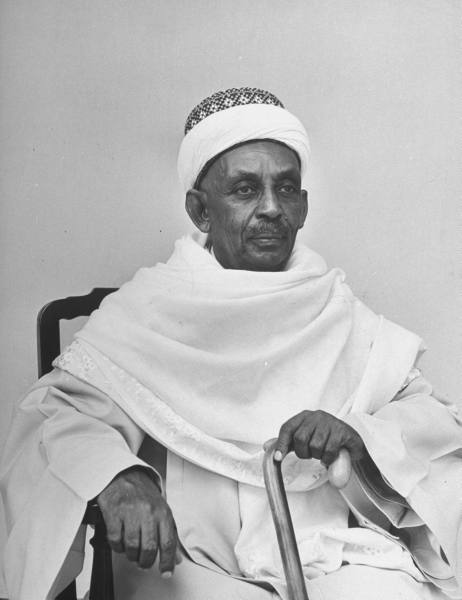

Personal life
- Born: 1873 Massawa, Turco-Egyptian Sudan
- Died: 21 February 1968 (aged 94–95) Hillat Khojali, Khartoum North, Republic of Sudan
- Political party: National Unionist Party (1952–1956); People's Democratic Party (1956–1967)
- Education: Al-Azhar University (no degree)

Religious life
- Religion: Khatmiyya (Sunni Islam)
- Lineage: Al-Mirghani family

Sir Sayyid Ali al-Mirghani (Arabic: علي الميرغني, 1873 – 21 February 1968) was a Sudanese religious and political leader. The late leader of the Khatmiyya, a sufi order known in Egypt, Sudan and Eritrea. His family, settled in Kassala and Suakin, were hostile to the Mahdist state and allied with the Egyptian government, and the hostility between the Mahdist and Khatmiyya was fierce until the 1989 coup d'état.

== Biography ==
=== Early life ===
Ali al-Mirghani was born on Masawa in northern Sudan in 1873 (Note: 1879, 1875, and 1884 are also mentioned) into the Maraghna family, founded by his grandfather Mohammed Uthman al-Mirghani al-Khatim. His mother is from the Anqariab tribe of Berber and she died when he was 7.

IN 1881, Ali moved with his father to Kassala, where he remained, studied primary school until the Battle of Kassala between the Ansar of the Mahdist state and the Italian troops. After the battle, he left it to Masawa and then Suakin with his father, where he studied fiqh at the hands of his uncle, Muhammad Uthman Taj al-Sir al-Mirghani. During this time, his father visited Egypt seeking support in confronting the Mahdist state, but he died on 15 January 1886, and his grave in Cairo became a Sufi shrine.

=== Egyptian and English care ===
The family enjoyed the attention of the intelligence and colonial Anglo-Egyptian Sudan government, as stated in a letter from Holder Smith, Director of the Red Sea Directorate, to the Sirdar:

The Khatmiyya order still has a strong presence in Sudan, and this boy [Ali al-Mirghani] is expected to be of use to the government.

The government arranged financial allocations for the family to spend on followers, successors, and family members. The head of the family, Muhammad Uthman Taj al-Sir, received the largest share, and his share was transferred to Ali al-Mirghani after him. His uncle was encouraged to send him to Cairo, where he stayed for five years, during which he visited Al-Azhar al-Sharif and expanded his reading and learning, but he did not obtain an official degree from it.

=== Return to Sudan ===
Mahdism began to decline in eastern Sudan after the fall of Tokar in 1891 and then Kassala in 1894, so Ali al-Mirghani returned to Suakin, then moved to Kassala and then to Khartoum in 1901, three years after the Anglo-Egyptian occupation of Sudan in 1899 and.

Following the elimination of the Mahdist State, Ali and the rest of the Maraghna cooperated with the British in Sudan and were rewarded by facilitating his requests, continuing to receive subsidies, and enjoying a prominent social and political position. Ali was awarded decorations and knighted in 1916, and the Maraghna family regained and expanded their lands and religious sect, the Khatmiyya. The Maraghna divided the regions in Sudan among themselves. The regions under the leadership of Ali al-Mirghani were: Berber, Dongola, Wadi Halfa, Khartoum, and Kordofan, with his headquarters in Khartoum Bahri. Following his brother Sayyid Ahmed al-Mirghani's death in 1928, Ali al-Mirghani became the religious and political leader of the family, which rivalled the Ansar sect led by Sayyid Abd al-Rahman al-Mahdi.

Ali al-Mirghani responded by standing by the government on all occasions, supporting it in World War I and fighting Turkish propaganda that tried to exploit Turkey's status as an Islamic caliphate (as did his rival al-Mahdi). He helped to marginalise Ali Dinar, Sultan of Darfur, and signed a letter drafted by the intelligence services in his name, calling on Dinar to withdraw his forces from the border and securing his government's side. This enabled the British to prepare for the invasion of Darfur in 1916. Then, also by support of the British intelligence, he contacted Hussein bin Ali, King of Hejaz and reconciled him with the Muhammad ibn Ali al-Idrisi. He participated in the Arab Revolt (1916–1918) against the Ottoman Turks in coordination with Reginald Wingate Pasha, the British High Commissioner in Egypt. Ali al-Mirghani opposed the 1919 revolution in Egypt and sided with the British, issuing a memorandum to that effect with several Sudanese political leaders. He also condemned the Sudanese White Flag revolution in 1924.

Following the creation of Graduates' Club, in 1918, Ali became close to members of the club and promoted the idea of "Unity of the Nile Valley" that supported unity with Egypt under the Egyptian crown,emphasising cultural and geographical ties between the two nations, also fearing being under the rule of the Ansar. This led to the formation of the Ashiqqa (Brothers) party in 1943, which later became the National Unionist Party (NUP) in 1952. On the other hand, Abdul Rahman al-Mahdi of the Ansar sect, promoted the idea of "Sudan for Sudanese". This group dominated the club's leadership from 1920 to 1933. For this faction, the Mahdi was portrayed as the first Sudanese nationalist and Abd al-Rahman was to many an attractive leader of the independence movement. This faction formed the National Umma Party in February 1945.

The pro-Egyptian NUP boycotted the 1948 Legislative Assembly elections. As a result, pro-independence groups dominated the Legislative Assembly. On 19 October 1952, an agreement was reached between Britain and the Umma-dominated legislature and their allies in a coalition known as the Sudanese Independence Front. In 1953 parliamentary elections, the pro-Egyptian NUP won the election and his leader Ismail al-Azhari's recognised growing public opposition to union with Egypt. In response, al-Azhari shifted the party's stance to support Sudanese independence, which was declared on 1 January 1956.

Internal divisions between the al-Azhari faction and the Khatmiyya order, primarily around al-Azhari's secular policies, led to a split in June 1956, with the Khatmiyya order founding the new People's Democratic Party (PDP), under Ali al-Mirghani's leadership. The PDP and Umma steered the parliament to remove al-Azhari. His successor Abdallah Khalil orchestrated a self-coup on 17 November 1958 and handed the power to General Ibrahim Abboud. Abboud outlawed all political parties.

=== Death ===
Ali was afflicted with a disease in his kidney and died after the surgery, on 21 February 1968 in Hillat Khojali, Khartoum Bhari. He was succeeded by his son Mohamed Osman al-Mirghani as the leader of the Khatmiyya and the People's Democratic Party (PDP).

== Awards and honours ==
Ali was awarded the Companion of the Order of St Michael and St George in 1900, Knight Commander of the Order of St Michael and St George in 1916, and Knight Commander of the Royal Victorian Order in 1919.
