= Sara Nugdallah =

Sudanese politician (born 1945)

- سارة نقد الله
- Born: December 16, 1945; Wad Madani
- Education: University of Khartoum
- Employer: Omdurman Ahlia University

Sara Nugdallah (born December 16, 1945) is a Sudanese politician and educator who is Secretary General of the National Umma Party.

Sara Nugdallah was born on December 16, 1945 in Wad Madani, Sudan, the daughter of Prince Abdalla Abdul-Rahman Nugdalla, a prominent official in the National Umma Party, and Zainab Awad Jibril. She graduated with a BSC in mathematics from Cairo University in Khartoum in 1978 and a master's degree in mathematics from the University of Khartoum 1983. She worked as a faculty member and administrator at Omdurman Ahliya University.

Following the 1989 coup by Omar al-Bashir, she became a leading figure of opposition to the Bashir regime. She has been repeatedly arrested and imprisoned by Sudanese authorities, leading to outcries by Amnesty International and other groups. She was arrested and imprisoned for ten weeks in 1994 and again for two months in 1995. In 2014, she was beaten, arrested, and released on bail following a protest outside a prison. She was arrested and imprisoned in 2018 and following her release her passport was confiscated when she attempted to journey to Egypt for medical treatement. Her family members have also been government targets: her brother has been in a coma since 2003 following imprisonment and torture.
