= Socialist Republican Party (Sudan) =

Socialist Republican Party الحزب الجمهوري الاشتراكي
- General secretary: Ibrahim Bedri
- Founded: 1951
- Ideology: Socialism

The Socialist Republican Party (Arabic: الحزب الجمهوري الاشتراكي) was a political party in Sudan, founded in 1951. Ibrahim Bedri was the general secretary of the party. The party was floated ahead of the 1953 Sudanese legislative election. The party mobilized a section of tribal chiefs and sheikhs. However, the development of the Socialist Republican Party never took off, and the party lacked financial resources, organizational structures and a coherent programme.

== Profile ==
The party made its manifesto public on December 18, 1951. The party had a non-sectarian profile and advocated a republican form of government for an independent Sudan. Compared to some other parties, the party was open to a slower process towards independence and the possibility of Sudan staying in the Commonwealth. Moreover, the party opposed Egyptian influence over Sudan. The party supported the continuation of the leading role of the governor-general, and rejected mass dismissals of British administrators.

== Following ==
Some of the members of the new party were won over from the Umma Party. The party also gathered a few intellectuals.

It won support mainly in regions were the legacy of Muhammad Ahmad (father of the Umma Party leader Abd al-Rahman al-Mahdi) was remembered as violent and repressive.

== Allegations of British involvement ==
The creation of the party was attributed to the British colonial authorities. Through the launching the Socialist Republican Party the Sudan Political Service (a British colonial government institution) sought to win support from Khatimyya voters in order to counter the influence of al-Mahdi. The open support from the British authorities did, however, render the party unpopular amongst the Sudanese population in general. The Umma Party refused any cooperation with it. By January 1952 it had gained the nickname 'Mr. Hawkesworth's Party' by the Sudanese, playing on the perception that the party had been engineered by the Assistant Civil Secretary (Political) Desmond Hawkesworth. Abd al-Rahman al-Mahdi perceived the party as a British conspiracy and an immediate threat to his political life, and set out to destroy it. As a result of the pressure from Abd al-Rahman al-Mahdi, several nazirs left the party and rejoined the Umma Party.

== 1953 election ==
The Socialist Republican Party won three seats in the House of Representatives in the 1953 election, two from Blue Nile and one from Darfur. The poor showing of the party in the election was seen with disappointment amongst the British colonial authorities. Immediately after the 1953 election, the Republican Socialist Party began to fall apart. As of 1954, the party had virtually disappeared. In early 1955 the party joined Independence Front, a coalition of opponents to the Ismail al-Azhari cabinet.
