= 1986 Sudanese parliamentary election =

- 1–12 April 1986

260 of the 301 seats to the National Assembly Elections delayed in 41 seats 131 seats needed for a majority
- Registered: 5,978,000
- Turnout: 3,948,544 (66.05%)
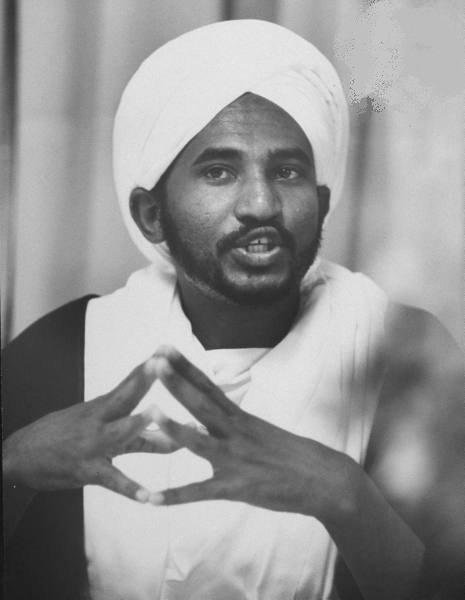

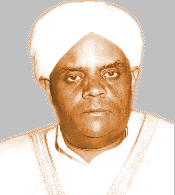

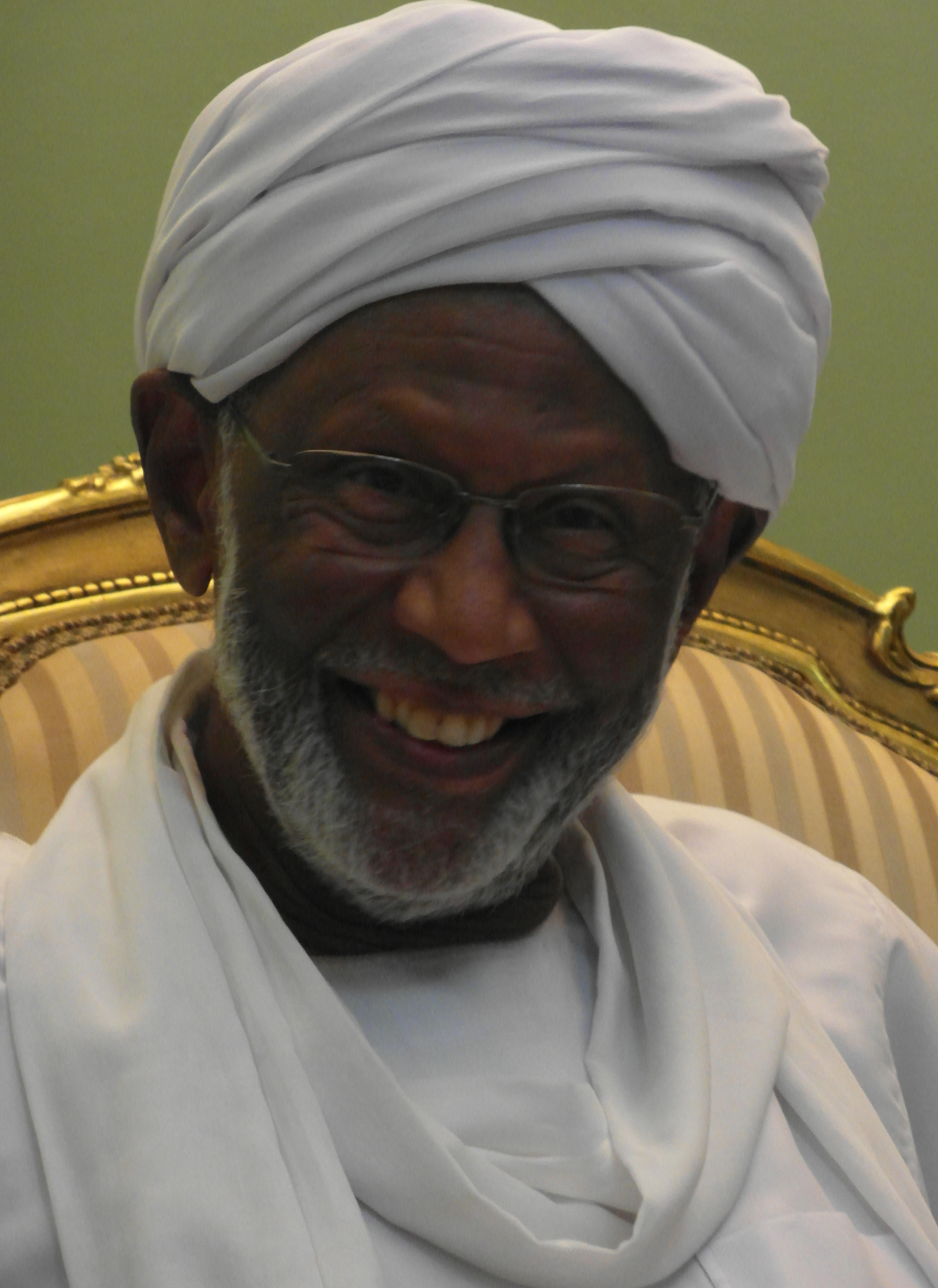
	First party	Second party	Third party
Leader	Sadiq al-Mahdi	Ahmed al-Mirghani	Hassan al-Turabi
Party	National Umma Party	DUP/NUP	NIF
Leader's seat	Aba Island		Sahafa-Gabra (lost)
Last election	Banned	Banned	Banned
Seats won	100	63	51
Seat change	▲100	▲63	▲51
Popular vote	1,508,334	1,201,623	726,021
Percentage	38.44%	30.63%	18.51%
- Results by state
Prime Minister before election
Al-Jazuli Daf'allah
Independent
Elected Prime Minister
Al-Sadiq al-Mahdi
NUP

Parliamentary elections were held in Sudan between 1 and 12 April 1986 to elect members of the National Assembly. They were the first multi-party elections in the country since 1968, taking place one year after the overthrow of President Gaafar Nimeiry by the military. The National Umma Party, led by Sadiq al-Mahdi, emerged as the largest party, winning 100 of the 260 filled seats. It was followed by the Democratic Unionist Party with 63 and the National Islamic Front with 51. No single party secured a majority, leading to the formation of a fragile coalition government.

The election took place amidst the Second Sudanese Civil War, and voting was postponed indefinitely in 41 seats in Southern Sudan due to security concerns. The election was among the freest and fairest elections in Africa up to that time. There were no reports by observers of electoral fraud.

To date, these are the last free elections held in Sudan.

== Issues ==
=== Nimeiri's rule and aftermath ===
The 1969 Sudanese coup d'état disrupted Sudan's evolving electoral landscape, temporarily halting the political development but not eliminating it entirely. The beneficiary of this time was the National Islamic Front (INF). Unlike most other parties, which were banned or forced to operate underground, the Muslim Brotherhood, which was linked to the INF, was permitted to participate in government, occupy judicial positions, and operate relatively openly. This enabled the INF to consolidate and expand its influence during a time of widespread political repression. The long-term consequences of this era were economic decline, social dislocation, and political confusion.

In the month following the 1985 Sudanese coup d'état, political activity surged, with 48 political groups being established or revived, most signing the Charter of the National Alliance. The INF was one of the major parties rejecting the charter as it called for constitutional revision, a secular constitution, had the Sudanese Communist Party (SCP) as a member, and for negotiating with the Sudan People’s Liberation Movement (SPLM).

=== Modern forces ===
Some alliance members advocated for special representation of the "modern forces" (trade unionsist, professional groups, farmers' societies, and women), as many as half the seats. They argued that these forces had played a leading role in the popular uprising that led to Gaafar Nimeiry's downfall and thus deserved guaranteed representation to safeguard their achievements. Others argued for a more narrow definition, limiting special representation to post-secondary graduates, as had been the case in previous democratic elections, citing the high illiteracy rate among the population. The first idea was rejected by the Transitional Military Council (TMC).

=== September Laws ===
In September 1983, Nimeiri implemented his version of Sharia law known as the September Laws. The laws were highly controversial, particularly for their harsh and punitive elements. Despite widespread criticism, the TMC neither annulled the laws nor introduced a new, non-punitive penal code.

=== Second Sudanese Civil War ===
In the South, the Second Sudanese Civil War was raging between the Sudanese government and the SPLM, a South Sudanese rebel group demanding more representation for Southern Sudan. In addition to the SPLM, various other insurgent groups had been active in different regions of the country. The alliance members engaged in meetings and negotiations with the SPLM in an effort to find common ground and explore paths toward peace.

=== Foreign relations ===
At the time, the United States was the largest aid donor to Sudan; however, relations began to strain after the TMC re-established ties with Muammar Gaddafi's Libya. Soon after, Libya shut down an anti-Sudanese radio station operating within its borders and pledged to cease its support for the southern rebels.

== Parties ==
=== Tradition-based parties ===
The Democratic Unionist Party (DUP) and National Umma Party drew their support from traditional religious loyalties of well-established Muslim sects, which, while gradually declining, still held considerable influence in northern Sudan. Both of these groups had been dominant until the 1969 coup.

==== Democratic Unionist Party ====
The DUP evolved out of the Ashiqqa Party, a party established by western-educated, urban Sudanese. While this meant leading Unionists were secularly inclined elite, its rural base was anchored in the Khatmiyya, the largest tariqa in northern Sudan. As the Mirghani family, hereditary leaders of the Khatmiyya, had enjoyed favor under colonial rule, the tariqa, and later by extension the party that it supported, drew support from groups influenced by administrative and economic factors, the northern riverine tribes and the commercial classes in the towns. This uneasy alliance came as a result of the Unma Party being founded by Abdul Rahman al-Mahdi, Imam of the Ansar, the largest Muslim sect and traditional rivals of the Khatmiyya. Traditionally, the Unionists were pro-Egyptian.

During Nimeiri's rule, the urban wing of the party, the National Unionist Party (NUP), was led by Sharif al-Hindi, who died in exile in 1982 after refusing to return to Sudan. Within the country, the party's local branches, which had functioned more as electoral vehicles than as organized political institutions, fell into decline. Meanwhile, Muhammad Osman al-Mirghani, the head of the Khatmiyya, kept a distance from active politics and made no clear statements on the September Laws. Nevertheless, some of his followers held senior administrative positions within Nimeiri's government.

Consequently, by the time of the uprising, the DUP was left relatively leaderless and without a coherent platform or structure. The NUP branch was revived under Ali Mahmud Hasanain, who advocated for a multilingual, multiracial, multireligious, and non-sectarian Sudan. They supported decentralisation to ensure more equitable distribution of the country's wealth.

The mainstream DUP was more conservative on social issues, with Mirghani and DUP Secretary General al-Sharif Zein al-Abedeen al-Hindi believing that Sharia should remain the law of the land, supporting revision to Nimeiri's code but not annulment. It also criticized the effort to negotiate with the SPLM, positioning itself against the NUP. The DUP wished to curb the latter.

The DUP never issued a complete political platform, leaving much to the discretion of individual candidates. Most of them endorsed a parliamentary system, rejected special representation for the modern forces (which would have favored the NUP), and advocated for a mixed economy rooted in Islamic principles that still allowed space for private enterprise.

The party lacked a formal nomination process, permitting anyone to run under its banner. This often led to vote-splitting among DUP candidates in the same constituencies, contributing to electoral losses.

==== National Umma Party ====
Abd al-Rahman had built extensive agricultural enterprises in the White Nile area, providing employment for thousands of Ansar immigrants from the west, and using the profits to increase his following by patronising local shaykhs and a minority section of the emerging Khartoum intelligentsia, benefiting the future party. In the mid-1960s, Umma split between conservatives led by the Ansar Imam Al-Hadi al-Mahdi, the second son of Abd al-Rahman, and a younger, reform-minded element represented by his Oxford-educated nephew, Sadiq al-Mahdi.

During Nimeiri's rule, Sadiq repeatedly called for popular elections and accountable public officials, intensifying after the passing of the Stember laws. Another dissident party, the Umma and Ansar Party of Ahmed al-Madhi, an uncle of Sadiq who supported Nimeiri and the law, arose from this. This party did not partake in the election. After the bombing of Aba Island in 1970, Sadiq went into exile in London and Libya. The attack led to the death of Al-Hadi, who was killed while attempting to flee to Ethiopia. Sadiq maintained good relations with Libya.

After Nimeiri's fall, Sadiq undertook efforts to reorganize and reinvigorate the party by bringing in young intellectuals and activists, while also maintaining the party's traditional Ansar base. The party platform envisioned the establishment of a modern Islamic society grounded in principles of human dignity and personal freedom, opposing the September laws. It advocated for a legal system based on the Quran, Sunnah, and other legislative sources, provided they did not conflict with each other. The envisioned government structure included both a president and a parliament, alongside empowered regional administrations, proportional representation, more modern forces representation, and a fair distribution of development and investment across sectors and regions. He also emphasized the protection of civil liberties and religious freedom.

Sadiq wished for the party to be in the center of the political spectrum, wanting it to serve as a nationwide umbrella party that would attract a wide range of political allies, including unionists, regionalists, and even anti-NIF Muslim Brotherhood. He saw the party as the most legitimate nationalist force in the Sudan, deriving its authority and inspiration from the Mahdist State and opposition to Nimeriri. In his vision, the party would remain faithful to Islamic principles while also accommodating peaceful coexistence with non-Muslims.

Sadiq reserved his political criticism primarily for the NIF. He openly condemned his brother-in-law, Hassan al-Turabi, and the NIF's "blood-thirsty" judiciary for their involvement in supporting Nimeiri's regime and enforcing the September Laws. Sadiq even expressed a desire to see the NIF's political activities curtailed, arguing that the group had been a key component of Nimeiri's system and had actively opposed the popular uprising.

=== Ideology parties ===
In the 1940s, communism and neo-Islamic revivalism arrived in Sudan via Egypt. These groups, along with ethnic-based parties, didn't emerge as alternatives until the 1965 elections. That election followed the October 1964 Revolution, which had been led by the left-wing Professionals Front. These groups made electoral inroads into urban areas traditionally dominated by Unionists.

==== Sudanese Communist Party ====
Founded in 1946 by a group of Cairo University students, the SCP played a pioneering role in trade union activity among railwaymen and cotton-growing tenants in the Gezira. The party dominated the Gezira tenants' union and the national railway workers' movement.

After Nimeiri's fall, the party opposed ties with Egypt or Libya and advocated for state-driven national planning. In the election, it ran a subdued campaign, recognizing the need for more time to regroup its base and out of fear of provoking religious backlash, which had happened before. The party attacked the NIF and pan-Arab Ba'ath Party activists, although it occasionally cooperated with the latter in opposition to the NIF.

==== Arab Ba'ath Socialist Party ====
The Iraqi-backed Arab Ba'ath Socialist Party, led by brothers Badr al-Din Muddathir Amin and Taisir, invested heavily in the election campaign, with the primary goal of defeating the NIF, even extending both political and financial support to the Umma and the DUP. Its most impressive victory was backing the DUP candidate who took out the NIF leader.

==== Other leftist ====
Much of the Ba'ath activists' energy was spent debating with rival leftists, including the Syrian Ba'ath Party, the Arab Nasserite Socialist Party, the Islamic Socialist Party, and the allegedly Libyan-backed Popular Revolutionary Committees.

The Arab Nasserite Socialist Party, Syrian Ba'ath Party, the Marxist Union of Democratic National Forces, Socialist Labor Organization, and some regional groups formed the National Progressive Front, an electoral alliance. These groups were too small to have an impact on the national political scene and often ran against each other. Additionally, they were seen by Sudanese as non-indigenous parties, as opposed to the indigenous SCP.

==== National Islamic Front ====
The local branch of the Muslim Brotherhood also emerged out of Cairo-educated students and staff at the University of Khartoum. Initially, the movement focused its activities within the university and higher secondary schools, until the October Revolution, when it established the NIF. In the 1965 election, the group won several seats and its leader, Turabi, topped the poll in the Graduates constituency.

Under Nimeiri, the Brotherhood participated in government, held judicial posts, and operated with relative openness. The party benefited significantly from financial support from sympathizers in Saudi Arabia and the Gulf states, as well as from the rise of Islamic banking in the early 1980s. These resources enabled the NIF to expand its social infrastructure by building health clinics and mosques.

The NIF's political platform described Islam as the official religion of the state and Arabic as the official language. Sharia was to guide all aspects of life and laws, with exception for religious freedom and the rights of minorities. It supported a Federal system, claiming they'd let miniortiy dominated regions void the Sharia, at least in terms of the criminal code. NIF supporters defended Nermimi's September laws and the execution of Mahmoud Mohammed Taha. The party also gained traction for its hard-liner stance against the rebellion in the south.

Unlike a lot of parties, the NIF was competent, knowing not to present more than one candidate in each constituency and operating a network of youth and women organisations to ensure maximum registration and participation among its adherents. Exploiting the absence of proof of residency requirements for foreign citizens, the NIF also coordinated overseas supporters to register in constituencies across the country, giving it broad influence in all graduate districts.

==== Anti-INF Islamists ====
A small group led by Sadiq Abdallah Abd al-Majid retained the Muslim Brotherhood name. It was a part of the alliance and only ran three candidates.

=== Regional/ethnic parties ===
Alongside the ideological parties, non-arab, ethnic-based groups emerged across the country, accelerated by economic policies that concentrated resources in the already more developed riverine regions. In the mid-1950s, both the Nuba Mountains General Union and the Beja Congress arose as pressure groups of assemblymen from the traditional parties who felt neglected in favor of Arab-speaking areas. In 1965, Nuba and Beja stood on their own, winning several seats. After the uprising, the number of these parties expanded.

==== Sudan Rural Solidarity ====
The Sudan Rural Solidarity (SRS) formed as an alliance of 13 regionalist parties to improve their chances by coordinating support in their respective strongholds. The SRS advocated for a federal system, repeal of the September law, modern forces representation, and balanced economic development. It criticised the TMC for stripping away representation for the south.

The alliance was split on whether to support a secular constitution, fearing it'd cost them votes, and whether they preferred a capitalist or socialist system, but agreed to disagree.

Most member groups were too small and localizaed to have a chance at winning a seat, simply running to get voters accumulated with them. In the north, only the Sudanese National Party (SNP), a personal vehicle for Rev. Philip Abbas Ghabboush, had a chance at winning seats. Ghabboush was a Nuba Christian who had fought with the South Sudanese rebels, advocating for Nuba and South Sudanese autonomy or independence, and openly supported the southern rebel cause, attempting a coup in 1984. He sought an African Sudan, not an Arab one. For this election, the SNP reached an agreement with Umma that the latter would not contest the SNP in the Nuba mountains or Ghabboush's seat.

==== Beja Congress ====
The Beja were divided over supporting the Beja Congress or running under the DUP, hoping to influence the government better that way.

==== South ====
Unlike the SPLM, the Southern Sudanese Political Association (SSPA), the Sudan African Congress (SAC), and the Sudan African National Union (SANU) were wary of boycotting. They felt that if they could secure enough seats to form a bloc, they could argue in favor of negotiations with the SPLM and southern interests. Of these, the SAC was the newest and closest in ideology to the SPLM.

The Peoples Progressive Party (PPP) and the Sudan African Peoples Congress Organization (SAPCO), the two parties in Equatoria, ran to maintain Equatoria as a separate region, opposing reunion with Bahr al-Ghazal and Upper Nile, a position supported by several other southern parties. They also opposed the September law and saw the SPLM as a Marxist, Dinka-led, Ethiopian-backed organization. They opposed each other as they were made up of different ethnic groups.

In Bahr al-Ghazal and Upper Nile, the contesting parties included the SSPA, SANU, SAC, and minor groups such as the Sudanese Peoples Federal Party (SPFP). The SPFP was linked to Anyanya II and opposed the SPLM on ethnic and partial ideological grounds.

== Electoral system ==
After conducting lengthy discussions with political forces, the TMC decided that the National Assembly would comprise 301 seats, 264 of which being geographic and another 28 reserved for post-secondary graduates. The election in 37 of the 68 constituencies in the south, where fighting from the war was most intense, was postponed indefinitely. A total of 41 southern seats ended up being vacant.

Each constituency operated under First-past-the-post voting, which resulted in situations where winners received only a small plurality and won by a narrow margin of victory. Voting was available to all men and women over 18.

During voting, an election official, a police officer, who was responsible for verifying voters and supervising the sealing of ballot boxes at the end of each day, and representatives of the competing parties, were present at each polling booth. Ballot boxes were stored securely in military camps, and after the election, they were opened by the same officials who had sealed them, in the presence of other witnesses. To prevent double voting, each voter had two fingers marked with indelible ink, which was designed to last at least two weeks.

== Campaign ==
=== Voter registration ===
Voter registration lasted from 18 January to 23 February, with candidate nominations held in the first half of March. Of the estimated 8.8 million eligible voters, a total of 5,978,000 people were registered, a 93% increase from the electorate in the 1968 election. In the south, only about 1/4 were registered, according to likely inflated numbers.

=== Campaigning ===
The campaign period was relatively subdued, largely due to the famine and restraints on public demonstrations imposed by the TMC, which sought to prevent unrest. Main party leaders, such as Sadiq and Turabi, conducted province tours. In Khartoum, campaigning was mainly conducted through party newspapers, posters, and vehicles equipped with loudspeakers, such as minibuses and pickup trucks.

== Conduct ==
In the months preceding the election, at least 30 people were killed in violent clashes in Wau, Kordofan, Port Sudan, and Khartoum between supporters of the NIF, left-wingers and Nuba. The deadliest incident occurred in Port Sudan, where a clash between supporters of the SNP and pro-INF Beni Amer tribesmen left 16 dead and over 100 wounded.

The election in the north went relatively smoothly, with only a few individuals being jailed or fined for attempting to vote in place of someone else. While some parties did accuse each other of bribing voters and/or providing transport to the polls for their voters, observers did not report any incidents of political fraud. In two southern constituencies, voting was revoked due to the assassination of one of the candidates.

== Results ==
Only 30 parties ran, with only 11 winning a seat. Voting was conducted over 12 days, beginning on 1 April, with turnout fluctuating daily. The highest were in the Khartoum division of the capital region (80+%) and Graduates (90+%). In Khartoum constituency no.27 (Sahafa-Gabra), where Turabi faced off against a coalition candidate, the turnout reached 90%. A total of 1,178 candidates ran for 232 geographical constituencies, and 172 nominations were made for the 21 northern graduates seats. In 12 Southern constituencies, fewer than 1,000 votes were cast in each; in one instance, a candidate won with just 371 votes.

Umma improved this election, bolstered by the influx of Ansar migrants from the west and middle-class voters who viewed Sadiq as a moderate figure capable of defeating the NIF. Riding the Islamic revivalist sentiment following the Iranian Revolution, promoting a more restrained Islamization than that of Nimeiri or the Muslim Brotherhood, also helped it against the INF and dissidents.

The Unionists suffered their worst defeat ever, resulting from the NUP branch, led by Ali Mahmoud Hassanien, rejecting any links with the Khatmiyya religious leadership, as well as the presence of numerous unofficial Unionist candidates.

The INF found its base in the educated and urban middle class, who grew tired of the Sufi orders and the secular parties. The INF were competent, fielding only one candidate per constituency, deploying its resources effectively, and having a rank and file with discipline stronger than all other parties. There were also disappointing results for the party; Turabi lost to the DUP's Hassan Shibhu, who was backed by Umma, SCP, and the Ba'ath Party, being replaced by Ali Osman Mohamed Taha as the party's legislative leader. NIF general secretary, Yasin Omar al-Imam, was defeated by an SCP candidate backed by Umma and DUP.

Party	Votes	%	Seats
National Umma Party	1,508,334	38.44	100
Democratic Unionist Party	1,163,961	29.67	63
National Islamic Front	726,021	18.51	51
Sudanese National Party	86,461	2.20	8
Sudanese Communist Party	67,937	1.73	3
National Unionist Party	37,662	0.96	0
Sudan Rural Forces Solidarity	37,070	0.94	0
Arab Socialist Ba'ath Party	35,767	0.91	0
Sudan African People's Congress	31,944	0.81	7
National Umma Party–Iman	29,241	0.75	0
Peoples Progressive Party	27,674	0.71	10
Southern Sudanese Political Association	25,268	0.64	8
Beja Congress	14,291	0.36	1
Sudan African Congress			2
Sudan People's Federal Party			1
Other parties	33,122	0.84	0
Independents	98,606	2.51	6
Vacant			41
Total	3,923,359	100.00	301
Valid votes	3,923,359	99.36	
Invalid/blank votes	25,185	0.64	
Total votes	3,948,544	100.00	
Registered voters/turnout	5,978,000	66.05	

=== By state ===
==== Graduate constituencies total ====
Votes given towards the graduate seats. Graduate seats also included in the seat total of the state results below.

The total vote was 207,555

Party	Votes	%	Seats
National Islamic Front		38.2	23
Sudanese Communist Party		19.2	1
Umma Party		15.9	0
Democratic Unionist Party		9.6	0
National Unionist Party		2.0	0
Arab Socialist Ba'ath Party		2.0	0
Peoples Progressive Party		0.4	2
Southern Sudanese Political Association		0.3	1
Sudan African People's Congress		0.2	0
Sudanese African Congress			1
Others		5.2	0
Independents		7.0	0
Total			28

==== Central total ====
Turnout was 75.3%

Party	Votes	%	Seats
Umma Party		47.2	29
Democratic Unionist Party		30.5	15
National Islamic Front		13.2	9
Sudanese National Party		1.5	0
Sudanese Communist Party		1.2	0
Umma Party–Iman		1.1	0
National Unionist Party		0.8	0
Arab Socialist Ba'ath Party		0.6	0
Sudan Rural Forces Solidarity		0.3	0
Other parties		0.6	0
Independents		2.8	2
Total			55

==== Darfur total ====
Turnout was 63.3%

Party	Votes	%	Seats
Umma Party		61.5	34
Democratic Unionist Party		16.7	2
National Islamic Front		15.5	6
Umma Party–Iman		1.0	0
Arab Socialist Ba'ath Party		0.6	0
Sudanese Communist Party		0.1	0
Other parties		1.9	0
Independents		3.0	1
Total			43

==== Kordofan total ====
Turnout was 65.7%

Party	Votes	%	Seats
Umma Party		48.4	20
Democratic Unionist Party		26.4	9
National Islamic Front		15.2	7
Sudanese National Party		6.6	7
Arab Socialist Ba'ath Party		0.9	0
National Unionist Party		0.2	0
Sudanese Communist Party		0.1	0
Other parties		0.2	0
Independents		0.1	0
Total			43

==== Khartoum total ====
Turnout was 80.1%

Party	Votes	%	Seats
Democratic Unionist Party		30.5	9
National Islamic Front		29.8	16
Umma Party		20.7	6
Sudanese Communist Party		6.0	2
Sudanese National Party		4.5	1
National Unionist Party		2.4	0
Arab Socialist Ba'ath Party		2.1	0
Sudan Rural Forces Solidarity		1.6	0
Umma Party–Iman		0.1	0
Other parties		0.7	0
Independents		1.6	0
Total			34

==== Eastern total ====
Turnout was 57.5%

Party	Votes	%	Seats
Democratic Unionist Party		43.0	17
Umma Party		22.2	7
National Islamic Front		18.3	5
Sudan Rural Forces Solidarity		5.4	0
Beja Congress		3.3	1
Sudanese Communist Party		1.4	0
Sudanese National Party		1.0	0
National Unionist Party		0.6	0
Arab Socialist Ba'ath Party		0.4	0
Other parties		0.1	0
Independents		4.3	1
Total			31

==== Bahr el Ghazal total ====
Turnout was 17.3%

Party	Votes	%	Seats
Southern Sudanese Political Association		44.5	4
Umma Party		31.2	1
National Islamic Front		23.4	1
Sudanese Communist Party			1
Independents		0.8	0
Vacant			24
Total			31

==== Equatoria total ====
Turnout was 28.3%

Party	Votes	%	Seats
Sudan African People's Congress		38.0	7
Peoples Progressive Party		32.5	10
Southern Sudanese Political Association		16.9	2
National Islamic Front		6.6	0
Umma Party		0.3	0
Other parties		1.4	0
Independents		4.3	1
Vacant			2
Total			22

==== Upper Nile total ====
Turnout was 39.9%

Party	Votes	%	Seats
Umma Party		37.1	1
Southern Sudanese Political Association		21.8	2
National Islamic Front		9.4	1
Democratic Unionist Party		3.8	0
Peoples Progressive Party		1.1	0
Sudan African Congress			2
Sudan People's Federal Party			1
Other parties		25.5	0
Independents		1.3	0
Vacant			15
Total			22

==== Northern total ====
Turnout was 82.2%

Party	Votes	%	Seats
Democratic Unionist Party		46.2	11
National Islamic Front		30.2	6
Umma Party		15.2	2
National Unionist Party		2.3	0
Sudanese Communist Party		1.6	0
Arab Socialist Ba'ath Party		0.9	0
Sudanese National Party		1.0	0
National Unionist Party		0.6	0
Arab Socialist Ba'ath Party		0.4	0
Other parties		0.1	0
Independents		3.4	1
Total			20
