= Mirghani Alnasri =

Sudanese politician (1927–2010)

Member of The State Council of Sudan
- In office 1987–1989
- President: Ahmed al-Mirghani
- Preceded by: Abdel Rahman Swar al-Dahab
- Succeeded by: Post abolished

Personal details
- Born: 1 July 1927 Rufa'a, Al Jazeera, Anglo-Egyptian Sudan (now Sudan)
- Died: 4 October 2010 (aged 83)
- Spouse: Maymouna Muhammed Taha

Mirghani Alnasri (Arabic : ميرغني النصري) (1 July 1927 – 4 October 2010) was a Sudanese politician. He started out as a lawyer in 1956, eventually becoming recognized as one of the Members of the Council of the State of Sudan.

== Background ==
Mirghani Alnasri was born in Rufa'a, Al Jazeera, Anglo-Egyptian Sudan on 1 July 1927. He graduated with a diploma from Hantoub High School, which is known for its high-profile politician alumni. Alnasri graduated from Gordon Memorial College in 1955.

In 1957, he married Maymouna Muhammed Taha, and they had eight children. He died on 4 October 2010, at the age of 83.

== Political career ==
While in college, Alnasri was a member of the Islamic Socialist Party.

He started his career as a lawyer in 1956.

From 1973 to 1985 (with the exception of 1974 and 1976), he was elected the leader of the Sudanese Bar Association.

== Publishing career ==
Alnasri was the author of a variety of political articles that were published in Al Rai Alaam Newspaper (Arabic: الرأي العام). He also published a book, Principles of constitutional law and the democratic experiment in Sudan (Arabic: مبادي القانون الدستوري والتجربة الديمقراطية في السودان), in 1998.

== Sources ==
- https://news.google.com/newspapers?nid=1309&dat=19870824&id=UXtPAAAAIBAJ&sjid=YpADAAAAIBAJ&pg=6785,5255928
- "Sudan 1991" (PDF). Human Rights Watch.
- Mabadi al-qanun al-dusturi wa-al-tajribah al-dimuqratiyah fi al-Sudan
