= People's Democratic Party (Sudan) =

1956–1967 political party in Sudan

- Abbreviation: PDP
- Leader: Sayyid Ali al-Mirghani
- Founded: June 1956
- Dissolved: 1967
- Split from: National Unionist Party (NUP)
- Merged into: Democratic Unionist Party (DUP)
- Ideology: Khatmiyya Sufi Islamism
- Religion: Islam with Sufi-orientation

The People's Democratic Party was a political party in Sudan. It was formed in 1956 following a split in the National Unionist Party (NUP). Those who left the NUP to form the PDP were largely members of the Khatmiyya Sufi order. After a period of siding with the Umma party, the PDP would later realign with the NUP, and the two parties merged in 1968 to form the Democratic Unionist Party.

== Background ==
The National Unionist Party had been founded in 1953 from supporters of Ismail al-Azhari, and members of the Khatmiyya Sufi order. These two factions sat uneasily with each other, and had been brought together as much for tactical reasons as for ideological cohesion. The initial Azhari-Khatmiyya alliance had come about because the Azhari led urban nationalists lacked a wide enough base to achieve electoral success alone, and had found greater cause with the Khatmiyya than with the Ansar, who would form the Umma party.

== Split from the NUP ==
Despite their union however, the Azhari faction and the Khatmiyya faction lacked ideological cohesion, and this internal divide would form the basis of the split, which saw 21 members of the ruling NUP leaving to form the People's Democratic Party in June 1956.
