= Democratic Unionist Party (Sudan) =

Political party in Sudan

Democratic Unionist Party الحزب الإتحادي الديموقراطي Al Hizb Al-Ittihadi Al-Dimuqrati
- Founder: Sayyid Ali al-Mirghani, Ismail Al-Azhari
- Founded: 1952
- Merger of: Khatmiyya Sufi order Ashigga Party
- Headquarters: Khartoum
- Ideology: Sudanese nationalism; Liberal conservatism; Secularism; Mixed economy; Historical: New Sudan
- Political position: Centre-right
- National affiliation: National Democratic Alliance
- International affiliation: Socialist International
- National Assembly: 0 / 426

Party flag

The Democratic Unionist Party (DUP; Arabic: الحزب الإتحادي الديموقراطي, romanized: al-Hizb al-Ittihadi al-Dimuqrati), also referred to by itself as the Original Democratic Unionist Party, is a political party in Sudan, closely tied to the Khatmiyya Sufi order.

Established in 1952 as the National Unionist Party (NUP), it is one of two political parties predating Sudan's independence, along with the Umma Party. Founded by Mohammed Uthman al-Mirghani II's Khatmiyya order and Ismail al-Azhari's urban nationalist Ashigga Party (est. 1943), it is often considered Sudan's oldest political party. Having won a clear majority in Sudan's first parliamentary election, al-Azhari became Sudan's first prime minister, who in 1955 declared independence from colonial rule.

The party broke apart in 1956, with the Khatmiyya order founding the new People's Democratic Party (PDP), but reunited in 1967, resulting in the current name. In 1986, DUP leader Ahmed al-Mirghani became President of Sudan until ousted by Omar al-Bashir's military coup in 1989. While the party's official leadership around Muhammad Uthman al-Mirghani II remained in exile, the Khartoum-based Political Secretariat seceded in 2011, resulting in the split into the Registered Democratic Unionist Party led by Jalal al-Digair.

== History ==
The party emerged in 1952 from the historic approach of the Khatmiyya Sufi order, founded in the first half of the 19th century by Mohammed Uthman al-Mirghani II, and Ismail al-Azhari's urban nationalist Ashigga Party, established in 1943. In Sudan's first parliamentary election the NUP won a legislative majority, making al-Azhari the first Sudanese Prime Minister under British–Egyptian colonial rule. On 19 December 1955, shortly after the First Sudanese Civil War had broken out, al-Azhari, declared the Independence of Sudan. Internal divisions between the al-Azhari faction and the Khatmiyya order however led to a split in 1956, with the Khatmiyya order founding the new People's Democratic Party (PDP). The party subsequently lost its majority, but remained a major political force even after General Abboud's 1958 coup d'état.

Al-Azhari and PDP leader Mohamed Osman al-Mirghani reunited in December 1967 in the presence of King Faisal of Saudi Arabia. Reestablished under the new name Democratic Unionist Party (DUP), the party won the 1968 election and subsequently formed a coalition government with the Umma Party. The government's proposal of an Islamic constitution thus making Sudan an Arab Muslim state lead to Colonel Nimeiry's 1969 coup d'état and the abolition of the parliament.

The party shortly returned to the political landscape in the 1986 election, where it won the largest number of votes though came second in number of seats having allowed too much freedom to its membership for constituency nominations. Ahmed al-Mirghani became President of Sudan, until ousted by Omar al-Bashir's 1989 military coup. Since then, the party's Chairman remained outside Sudan while allowing its members to freely decide on the degree of participation in central and state governments. In November 2022, following General al-Burhan's coup in 2021, party leader Mohamed Osman al-Mirghani returned to lead the party from Sudan, then shortly returned to Egypt where he resided for the last 3 decades.

== Ideology ==
The party's main platform is in favour of a united Sudan, and previously a united Sudan and Egypt.

The basic intellectual underpinnings of the party since its general congress in late 1960s, are: democratic pluralism politically, a mixed economy economically, and the establishment of a secular country towards as "the only acceptable way for peaceful coexistence in a country with different components of ethnic, tribal, religious, intellectual and cultural aspects in order to ensure the principle of that 'The sole basis of rights and duties should be based upon the Citizenship alone'."

The party has long-standing relations with the Sudan People's Liberation Movement (SPLM) with whom it signed the Peace Deal of November 1988 in Ethiopia which was then opposed by the National Islamic Front (NIF). It also enjoys good relationships with almost all Sudanese political groups.

The last legislative elections, December 2000, were boycotted by the party, as most of the political groups, described as unfair and rigged.

Through the National Democratic Alliance it played a major role in the opposition to the NIF regime in Sudan from 1989 until the signing of the Cairo Peace Agreement between the NDA and the Government of Sudan in 2005. As a consequence of its stances the DUP has suffered continuous attempts to divide and weaken it by the Sudanese security forces and the ruling party of Sudan, which seem to have failed so far.

Since the signing of the Comprehensive Peace Agreement between the SPLM and the Government of Sudan, the party's position has shifted towards a more mediatory role attempting to re-align the old and new opposition parties in a comprehensive stance to tackle the broader Sudanese issues such as unity, elections and transition into democracy avoiding polarisation which it views as damaging to the long term interests of the country.

It continues to view the National Democratic Alliance as a long-term alliance that could rightly guide the political movement in Sudan.

== Electoral history ==
=== Presidential elections ===
Election	Party candidate	Votes	%	Result
2010	Hatim al-Sir	195,668	1.93%	Lost ✗

=== National Assembly elections ===
National Assembly
Election	Party leader	Votes	%	Seats	+/–
1953	Ismail al-Azhari	229,221	Not released	51 / 97	▲51
1958	Ismail al-Azhari	Not released	Not released	45 / 173	▼6
1965	Ismail al-Azhari	Not released	Not released	59 / 207	▲14
1968	Ismail al-Azhari	742,226	40.8%	101 / 218	▲63
1986	Ahmed al-Mirghani	1,163,961	29.5	63 / 301	▲63
2010	Hatim al-Sir	Not released	Not released	2 / 426	▲2
2015		Not released	Not released	25 / 426	▲23
