= National Islamic Front =

1976–1998 Sudanese political Party

National Islamic Front الجبهة الإسلامية القومية
- Abbreviation: NIF
- Leader: Hassan al-Turabi
- Founded: 1976; 50 years ago
- Dissolved: 1998; 28 years ago
- Preceded by: Islamic Charter Front
- Succeeded by: National Congress Party
- Headquarters: Khartoum
- Armed wing: Popular Defence Forces
- Ideology: Sunni Islamism; Anti-communism; Neoliberalism
- Political position: Right-wing
- Religion: Sunni Islam
- International affiliation: Muslim Brotherhood

The National Islamic Front (NIF; Arabic: الجبهة الإسلامية القومية; transliterated: al-Jabhah al-Islamiyah al-Qawmiyah) was an Islamist political organization founded in 1976 and led by Dr. Hassan al-Turabi that influenced the Sudanese government starting in 1979, and dominated it from 1989 to the late 1990s. It was one of only two Islamic revival movements to secure political power in the 20th century (the other being the followers of Ayatollah Ruhollah Khomeini in the Islamic Republic of Iran).

The NIF emerged from Muslim student groups that first began organizing in the universities during the 1940s, and its main support base has remained the college educated. It supported the maintenance of an Islamic state run on Sharia and rejected the concept of a secular state. It took a "top down" or "Islamisation from above" approach of "infiltrating Sudan's state apparatus, army, and financial system". It demonstrated itself to be both politically adept and ruthless in its use of violence, in particular in the internal conflicts of the Second Sudanese Civil War and the War in Darfur, as well in the provisioning of proxy forces such as the Lord's Resistance Army, the West Nile Bank Front and the Uganda National Rescue Front II against Uganda.

In the late 1990s, the National Islamic Front changed its name to National Congress Party, and the "gross human rights violations" of the regime's early years gave way to "more subtle methods of social control such as restrictions on the right to freedom of expression, opinion, religion, association, and movement." In 1999, Hassan al-Turabi, leader of the NIF and his supporters were expelled from the ruling National Congress Party by President of Sudan Omar Hassan al-Bashir and subsequently founded the rival Popular Congress Party which has remained in opposition.

== History ==
=== Formation and early history ===
Created in the 1960s as an Islamist student group, it was known as the Islamic Charter Front (ICF). From 1964 to 1969, it was headed by Hassan al-Turabi after the overthrow of the government of President Ibrahim Abboud. During this period, the ICF supported women's right to vote and ran women candidates. In 1969, the government was overthrown by General Gaafar Nimeiry in a coup d'état, after which the members of the Islamic Charter Front were placed under house arrest or fled the country. Although strongly opposed to Communism, the NIF copied their organization. The National Islamic Front itself was founded following the failure of the anti-Numayri coup, led by the Ansar in July 1976.

=== Sources of strength ===
Turabi's group served as "intermediaries" between Sudan and Saudi Arabia, whose port Jeddah was almost directly across the Red Sea only about 200 miles from Port Sudan and capable of hosting Saudi immigrant workers. Following the Arab Oil Embargo, Saudi Arabia had serious financial resources which it could invest in Sudan to discourage communist influence. Throughout the Cold War, the organization benefited from the pro-Islamist support of Saudi Arabia. Saudi financial help for the NIF and its dominance of Islamic banking (which later meant all banking), gave them the means to transcend their original bases in intellectual and university circles.

In the fall of 1977, the Faisal Islamic Bank opened a branch in Sudan—60% of its start up capital was Saudi. By the mid-1980s the bank was second biggest in Sudan in terms of money held on deposit. Also founded in the late 1970s was the Al Baraka Bank. Both provided rewards for whose affiliated with Hassan al-Turabi's Islamist National Islamic Front—employment and wealth for young militant college graduates and easy credit for devout Muslim investors and businessmen.

In 1979, when Nimeiry sought an accommodation with the NIF, al-Turabi was invited to become Attorney-General, NIF members would help other member be placed in "every available position of power" in the Sudanese government. It also benefited from Nimeiry's falling out with his former communist allies. The Sudanese Communist Party (SCP) was the largest communist party in the Arab world and was the Islamists' rival amongst university students. The SCP and NIF appealed to university students by being less based on family connections than the mainstream Sudanese parties. Although Nimeiry called his regime socialist to the end he turned on the SCP as a threat to his power and likely as an impediment in gaining aid from the United States.

=== With al-Nimeiry regime ===
In 1983, al-Tarabi used his position as Attorney General to push for the strict application of Sharia. "Within eighteen months, more than fifty suspected thieves had their hands chopped off. A Coptic Christian was hanged for possessing foreign currency; poor women were flogged for selling local beer." Mahmoud Mohammed Taha, an Islamic intellectual who had reinterpreted Islamic law in a more liberal direction and opposed the new Sharia laws was hanged in January 1985. In March 1985, the leadership of the Muslim Brotherhood was charged with sedition. This came, in part, because Nimeiry had grown suspicious of their banking power. This official condemnation of the group proved temporary though as President Nimeiry had lost support of the Sudanese people and the military and was consequently overthrown. An attempt at democracy followed his overthrow and the organization attempted to use this to their advantage. In the 1986 elections their financial strength and backing among university graduates still gave them only ten percent of the vote and therefore a third-place position. They made up for this by increasingly gaining support of the military during a time of civil war. The well educated status of their leadership, al-Turabi was one of the best educated men in Sudan, also gained them prestige.

=== 1989 coup ===
In 1989, the southern rebels, Sudan People's Liberation Movement (SPLM) signed an agreement with the democratic government that included provisions for a cease-fire, the freezing of the Sharia (which the non-Muslim south opposed), the lifting of the state of emergency, and the abolition of all foreign political and military pacts and proposed a constitutional conference to decide Sudan's political future. On March 11 1989, Prime Minister Sadiq al-Mahdi formed a new governing coalition that included the Umma Party, the Democratic Unionist Party (DUP), and representatives of southern parties and the trade unions. The NIF refused to join the coalition because it was not committed to enforcing the Sharia.

On June 30 1989 this government was overthrown by Colonel (later General) Omar al-Bashir who was committed to imposing Sharia law and to seeking a military victory over the Sudan People's Liberation Army (SPLA). While some NIF leaders, including al-Turabi, were placed under house arrest following the coup as part of the internal power struggle that brought al-Bashir to power, they were soon released.

=== Alliance with military ===
The NIF alliance with the Omar al-Bashir putch has been described (by Olivier Roy) as similar to the Jamaat-e-Islami alliance with Pakistan General Muhammad Zia-ul-Haq. Jamaat-e-Islami also favored top-down Islamism and Zia also staged a coup against an elected government. Explanations for why the military allied itself with the NIF include its infiltration by the NIF, and the "ideological justification" the NIF gave the war as a jihad against the animists and Christians of the south, while the Pakistan military had just lost a war and Omar al-Bashir was continuing a war, both wars ended in the loss by secession of a large area of their country (Bangladesh and South Sudan), and in international criticism for millions of civilians killed and human rights abused.

=== Governance ===
Like the Jamaat-e-Islami in Pakistan, and unlike the Muslim Brotherhood in Egypt, or Islamic Salvation Front in Algeria, the NIF was interested in spreading Islam from above rather than preaching to the masses. It strove to eliminate the power of the traditional Sufi brotherhood based parties (the Democratic Unionist Party and the Umma Party) and replace them with itself. Under the NIF government, education was overhauled to focus on the glory of Arab and Islamic culture, and memorizing the Quran. Religious police in the capital insured that women were veiled, especially in government offices and universities.

Alleged human rights abuses by the NIF regime included war crimes, ethnic cleansing, a revival of slavery, torture of opponents, and an unprecedented number of refugees fleeing into Uganda, Kenya, Eritrea, Egypt, Europe and North America. Repression of the "secular middle class" was "savage" and unprecedented for Sudan where "political customs" were relatively relaxed. "Purges and executions were carried out in the upper ranks" of the army, and civil and military officials were subjected to Islamist "reeducation". Opponents were forced into exile to prevent them from organizing an alternative to the regime.

International organizations denounced the routine interrogation and torture by security agencies in anonymous "ghost houses". To compensate for its lack of mass support the NIF employed paramilitary force made up of Fula tribesmen (traditionally agricultural day labourers) to "do its dirty work", the tribesmen being bound to the NIF because "they risked forfeiting everything should the NIF lose its grip on power." In interviews al-Turabi dismissed abuses as minimal and attributed them to the "extreme sensitively" of his opponents.

The NIF intensified the war against the south which was declared a jihad. School uniforms were replaced with combat fatigues and students engaged in paramilitary drills. Young students learned jihadist chants. On state television, actors simulated “weddings” between jihad martyrs and heavenly virgins (houris) on state television. Turabi also gave asylum and assistance to non-Sudanese jihadi, including Osama bin Laden and other Al-Qaeda members. They also placed Sadiq al-Mahdi in prison (despite the fact he was related to Turabi by marriage, the two had become bitter enemies by the mid-1980s). The regime also committed what are widely deemed to have been massive human rights violations against religious minorities, particularly in the south. Women in Sudan could face execution for adultery even in cases of rape. This was used by several soldiers in their war against the south.

The NIF also tried to position itself as the world's leading Sunni Islamist organization, leading the only Sunni Islamist state before the Taliban. Although critical of Saddam Hussein, al-Turabi held an anti-American Islamist conference during Operation Desert Storm, toward the end of supporting the Iraqi people in their war. During terrorism expert Steven Emerson's 1998 testimony before the United States Senate, he implicated the Sudanese National Islamic Front as partly responsible for the February 1993 World Trade Center bombing. That attack, on February 26, 1993, occurred on the 2nd anniversary of the retreat of Iraqi forces from Kuwait, thus ending the 1991 Gulf War.

Beginning in 1991, they also harbored Osama bin Laden for several years after the Saudis revoked his citizenship. It is suspected they hoped he could aid them through his wealth and construction company. However, eventually the NIF government deemed him too great a liability and banished him.

Bin Laden had been exiled to Sudan because he had publicly spoken out against the Saudi government for basing U.S. troops in Saudi Arabia in order to oppose Iraq's takeover of Kuwait. So although bin Laden and the NIF appeared to be on opposite sides of sympathy for or against the Iraqi invasion of Kuwait, they both found differing reasons for their greater and common concern, the presence and involvement of the United States in that region's conflict.

The abuses against southerners (some of whom were Christians) had aroused the activism of Christian groups in Europe and the US. Sanctions were imposed by US and parlayed into legitimacy for the narrowly based NIF—a symbol of "resistance to imperialism". Sudan came under United Nations sanctions for sponsoring a 1995 assassination attempt on Egyptian President Hosni Mubarak.

=== Decreasing influence ===
Starting around 1999, Hassan al-Turabi's political clout waned. Between late 1999 and early 2000 the NIF went through a power struggle following an attempt by al-Turabi to take away Bashir's ability to name regional governors. In December 1999, Bashir stripped al-Turabi of his posts, dissolved parliament, suspended the constitution and declared a state of national emergency. Al-Turabi created a splinter Popular Congress Party in summer of 2000.

After the September 11, 2001 attacks, the regime made attempts to downplay, at least on the public international stage, any international Islamist aspects of the organization. Further, al-Turabi was imprisoned (temporarily) in 2004 and the regime allowed the Christian John Garang to be Vice President in a peace deal. By 2006, there had been “a hundred-and-eighty-degree turn” in al-Turabi’s stated views, with declarations of support for gender equality, democracy and human rights.

By 2012, South Sudan had gained independence, but abuses in Darfur had gained note, and the government was reportedly "still dominated" by high-ranking members of the NIF.

=== Islamist connections to the Sudanese Armed Forces ===
Although Bashir was deposed in the 2019 Sudanese Revolution, the NIF's structural legacy persisted. Many of its cadres and allied networks were never fully dismantled, and they re-emerged following the outbreak of war in 2023 as key supporters of the Sudanese Armed Forces (SAF). During the conflict, the SAF has increasingly relied on Islamist-aligned groups and militias connected to the Bashir era, including the al-Baraa Bin Malik Brigade. Individuals with ties to the former NIF regime were actively fighting alongside the army, and subsequent coverage has documented an organized "Islamist comeback" through their backing of the SAF. Analysts characterize this development as the revival of the NIF's broader political-military network, rather than a restoration of the old party itself.

== Electoral history ==
=== National Assembly elections ===
Election	Leader	Votes	%	Seats	+/–	Position	Result
1986	Hassan al-Turabi	726,021	18.51%	51 / 301	New	3rd	Opposition

== See also ==
- National Congress Party
- Sudan People's Liberation Movement
- Sudanese Socialist Union
