= Ahmed al-Mirghani =

President of Sudan from 1986 to 1989

Ahmad Al-Mirghani
- أحمد الميرغني
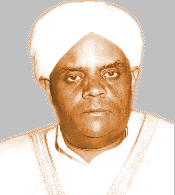
- Al-Mirghani, c. 1985

3rd President of Sudan
- In office 6 May 1986 – 30 June 1989
- Deputy: Abd al-Rahman Saeed
- Preceded by: Abdel Rahman Swar al-Dahab as Chairman of the Transitional Military Council
- Succeeded by: Omar al-Bashir

Personal details
- Born: 16 August 1941 Khartoum North, Anglo-Egyptian Sudan
- Died: 2 November 2008 (aged 67) Alexandria, Egypt
- Party: Democratic Unionist Party
- Children: 3

Ahmad Ali Al-Mirghani (Arabic: أحمد علي الميرغني; 16 August 1941 – 2 November 2008) was a Sudanese politician who served as the third President of Sudan from 1986 to 1989, when the democratically elected government was overthrown by a military coup led by Omar al-Bashir.

== Early life ==
Al-Mirghani was the descendant of the Mirghani family of Sudan and the son Ali al-Mirghani, the great-great-grandson of al-Sayyid Mohammed Uthman al-Mirghani al-Khatim. Ahmad Al-Mirghani held the title of Sayyid, denoting that he was accepted as a descendant of the Islamic prophet Muhammad. He graduated with a first class degree from the University of London and returned to Sudan. He played a major role in convincing King Faisal of Saudi Arabia to travel and meet President Nasser of Egypt in Sudan in the famous 1967 Arab League summit in Khartoum.

== Presidency ==
Al-Mirghani was elected President of Sudan in May 1986 after the country's last democratic elections. Under him an economic recovery program was created which began to be used in August 1987. This program was followed, beginning in October 1988, by a three-year recovery program to reform trade policy and regulate the exchange rate, reduce subsidies and the Budget deficit, and encourage exports and privatization. The government under him also had contact to the International Monetary Fund. He was unseated during the 1989 Sudanese coup d'état, led by Omar al-Bashir.

== Later years ==
Following the coup Al-Mirghani lived in Alexandria, Egypt. He returned to Sudan shortly before his death and lobbied for peace in the War in Darfur. He actively worked on the Darfur file and was chosen as the head of the Darfur Circle in the Democratic Unionist Party. His final trip abroad was to Libya where he held a number of meetings with Darfur rebel groups and the Libyan leadership regarding the solutions to the Western Sudan problem.

=== Death ===
Al-Mirghani died in Egypt on November 2, 2008, at the age of 67. Several Sudanese politicians including al-Bashir travelled to the Mirghani base in Khartoum to mourn the former president. His body was flown to Khartoum on November 5, and his funeral was held there on the same day. The funeral procession travelled from the airport in the south of the capital Khartoum through the city streets to the north of the capital, where he was buried.

== Panama Papers ==
In April 2016, al-Mirghani was named in the Panama Papers as owner of Orange Star Corporation, which was created in 1995 and based in the British Virgin Islands, an offshore tax haven that is often used for tax-evasion purposes. The Panama Papers revealed that Orange Star bought an apartment North of the Hyde Park area in London for £600,000. Today, apartments in the same area are sold for over 2 million British pounds. In 2008 at the time of al-Mirghani's death through the company he held 2.72 million US dollars in assets.
