= 1948 Sudanese parliamentary election =

Parliamentary elections were held in Sudan on 15 November 1948.

== Background ==
Constitutional reforms in 1948 replaced the appointed Advisory Council with a Legislative Assembly. The new Assembly had 75 members, of which 10 were appointed by the Governor-General, 42 elected by electoral colleges in northern provinces, 13 nominated by the provincial councils in the three southern provinces and 10 directly-elected in Khartoum and Omdurman.

== Campaign ==
The elections were boycotted by pro-Egyptian parties such as the National Front, leaving only the Umma Party and the Independence Front (which opposed union with Egypt) to contest the elections. Demonstrations led to the deaths of 10 deaths and 100 injured.

== Results ==
The Umma Party won 26 seats and the Independence Front four. Most of the remaining 44 members had been elected due to the influence of officials and sheikhs. Voter turnout in the directly-elected seats was only 18%.

== Aftermath ==
The newly-elected Legislative Assembly met for the first time on 15 December 1948. The Umma Party's Abdallah Khalil was elected Speaker.
