= 1953 Sudanese parliamentary election =

- 2 and 25 November 1953

All 50 seats in the Senate 26 seats needed for a majority All 97 seats in the House of Representatives 49 seats needed for a majority
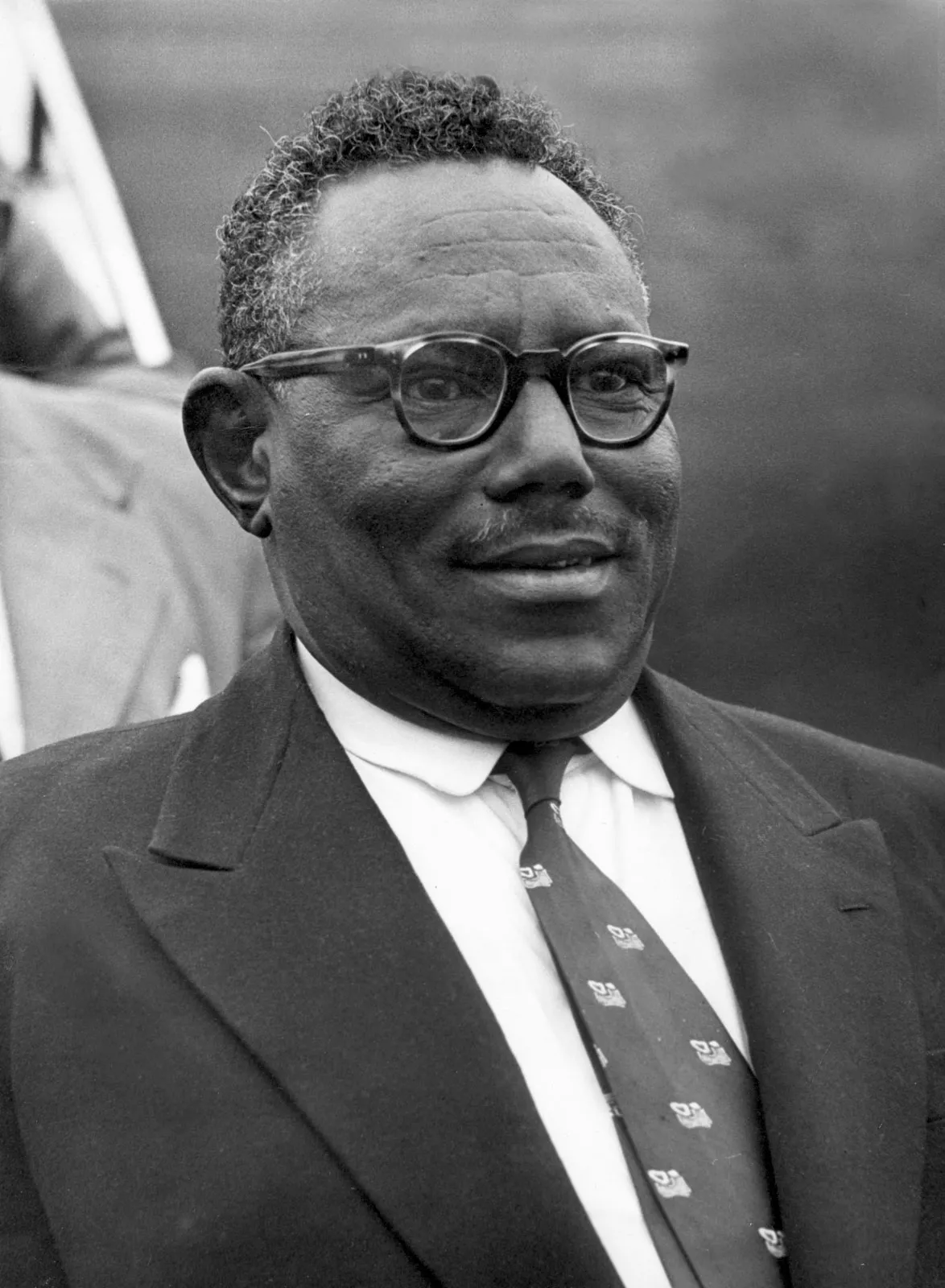

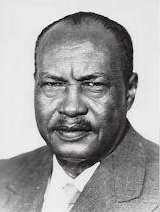
| | First party | Second party |
|---|---|---|
| Leader | Ismail al-Azhari | Abdullah Khalil |
| Party | DUP | NUP |
| House seats | 51 | 22 |
| Senate seats | 31 | 8 |
Chief Minister before election
Abd al-Rahman al-Mahdi
NUP
Elected Chief Minister
Ismail al-Azhari
DUP

Parliamentary elections were held in Sudan on 2 and 25 November 1953, prior to the implementation of home rule. The result was a victory for the recently founded National Unionist Party, led by Ismail al-Azhari, which won 51 of the 97 seats in the House of Representatives and was invited to form a government. The NUP also secured a majority in the Senate, winning 21 of the 30 indirectly elected seats, which were chosen by local and provincial councils; a further 10 of the 20 Senate members were nominated by British Governor-General.

Although the Umma Party and sections of the British press alleged that Egypt had interfered in the election, it was generally regarded as free and fair.

== Results ==
=== Senate ===
| Party | Votes | % | Seats | | |
| Party | Votes | % | Elected | Nominated | Total |
|---|---|---|---|---|---|
| National Unionist Party | | | 21 | 10 | 31 |
| Umma Party | | | 4 | 4 | 8 |
| Southern Party | | | 3 | 3 | 6 |
| Socialist Republican Party | | | 1 | 0 | 1 |
| Independents | | | 1 | 3 | 4 |
| Total | | | 30 | 20 | 50 |
| Total votes | 4,092 | – | | | |
| Registered voters/turnout | 4,926 | 83.07 | | | |
Source: Nohlen et al., Sternberger et al

=== House of Representatives ===
| Party | Votes | % | Seats |
|---|---|---|---|
| National Unionist Party | 229,221 | | 51 |
| Umma Party | 190,822 | | 22 |
| Southern Party | | | 9 |
| Socialist Republican Party | | | 3 |
| Anti-Imperialist Front | | | 1 |
| Independents | | | 11 |
| Total | | | 97 |
| Registered voters/turnout | 1,687,000 | – | |
Source: Nohlen et al., Sternberger et al.
