= Khatmiyya =

Sufi order

Flag used by the Khatmiyya order.

The Khatmiyya Arabic: الختمية, romanized: Khatmiyyah is a Sufi order or brotherhood (tariqa) founded by Sayyid Mohammed Uthman al-Mirghani al-Khatim. The Khatmiyya is the largest Sufi order in Sudan. It also has followers in Egypt, Chad, Saudi Arabia, Somalia, Uganda, Yemen and India.

Al-Sayyid Al-Khatim was born in At-Ta'if in Hijaz and buried in Mecca in Tihamah. He started his travels at the age of twenty five after gaining his education through a number of prominent Islamic scholars in Mecca of his time among whom was Sayyid Ahmad Ibn Idris al-Fasi.

== In Eritrea ==
The Khatmiyya spread into Eritrea in the early 19th century and became the region's largest Sufi order, backed first by the Egyptian administration and later by the Italian colonial government.
