= Mohammed Uthman al-Mirghani al-Khatim =

Founder of the Khatmiyya Sufi order (1793–1852)

Mohammed Uthman al-Mirghani (Arabic: محمد عثمان الميرغني, 1793 – 1852), known as al-Khatim (Arabic: الختم), was the founder of the Khatmiyya Sufi tariqa, of Islam, that has a following in Egypt, Sudan, Eritrea, Somalia and Ethiopia.

== Family ==
He was born into the Mirghani family in Mecca which was one of the most noble families that have descended from the Islamic prophet Muhammad. He is the son of Muhammad Abu Bakr who is the son of Abdallah al-Mahjoub who is the son of Ibrahim who is a descendant of the Islamic prophet Muhammad. The lineage of Muhammad Othman al-Mirghani was verified by Murtada al-Zubeidi and this was further verified by al-Jabarti in his book Taareekh al-Jabarti / al-Jabarti's History part two.

1. Muhammad
2. Ali ibn Abi Talib and Fatima Al Zahra
3. Imam Hussain
4. Imam Ali Zayn al-Abidin
5. Imam Muhammad al Baqir
6. Imam Ja'far al-Sâdiq
7. Imam Musa al-Kazim
8. Imam Ali al Reza
9. Imam Muhammad al Taqi
10. Imam Ali al Hadi
11. Imam Hasan al-Askari al-Khalis
12. Sayyid Ali al-Muttaqi
13. Sayyid Mir Uthman
14. Sayyid Mir Ali
15. Sayyid Mir Umar
16. Sayyid Mir Khurd Bukhari
17. Sayyid Ismail
18. Sayyid Muhammad
19. Sayyid Ali
20. Sayyid Abu Bakr Hasan
21. Sayyid Isa Hasan
22. Sayyid Yahya
23. Sayyid Ibrahim
24. Sayyid Ali
25. Sayyid Ahmad
26. Sayyid Hasan
27. Sayyid Ali
28. Sayyid Abd Allah
29. Sayyid Hasan
30. Sayyid Haydar
31. Sayyid Mir Khurd
32. Sayyid Hasan
33. Sayyid Ali Mirghani
34. Sayyid Muhammad Amin
35. Sayyid Hasan
36. Sayyid Ibrahim
37. Sayyid Abd Allah al-Mahjoubi
38. Sayyid Muhammad Abu Bakr
39. Sayyid Muhammad Othman al-Mirghani

Muhammad Uthman al-Mirghani was born in Ta'if and died in Mecca and was buried there in al-Ma'alla.

His sons followed in his footsteps after his death, the most famous of whom were Muhammad al-Hassan al-Mirghani, Gaafar as-Sadig al-Mirghani, Abdullahi al-Mahjoub al-Mirghani, Hashim al-Mirghani and Sirr al-Khatim al-Mirghani.

== Travels ==
Al-Khatim's religious journey began in Mecca from whence he travelled to Tarim in Yemen and then to Somalia by sea and to Massawa on the Red Sea coast where he travelled inland into the Ethiopian hinterland before returning to Mecca. On this trip tens of thousands of people embraced Islam including entire clans and tribes.

On his second trip, which started in the Egyptian countryside south of Cairo, he was accompanied by his teacher Ahmad ibn Idris who parted ways with him in Al-Zeyniyyah. Al-Khatim traversed the Nubian lands of the Mahas and the Sakot and went to Kordofan where he met the 19th century judge and scholar Arabi Ahmed Al-Hawwari, who became a principal follower and leader within the movement in Kordofan. He continued to Western Sudan and reached the lands of the Fur people and the Borno tribe. He then travelled to Sennar on the banks of the Blue Nile and to Shendi via Gezira and via the Butana to the Taka Mountain region near Kassala from which he entered into Ethiopia and visited many regions before returning to Mecca.

== Literature ==
- Ali Salih Karrar, R.S. O'Fahey, The Sufi Brotherhoods in the Sudan, Northwestern University Press, 1992 ISBN 978-0-8101-1045-8
