= National Umma Party =

Political party in Sudan

National Umma Party حزب الأمة القومي
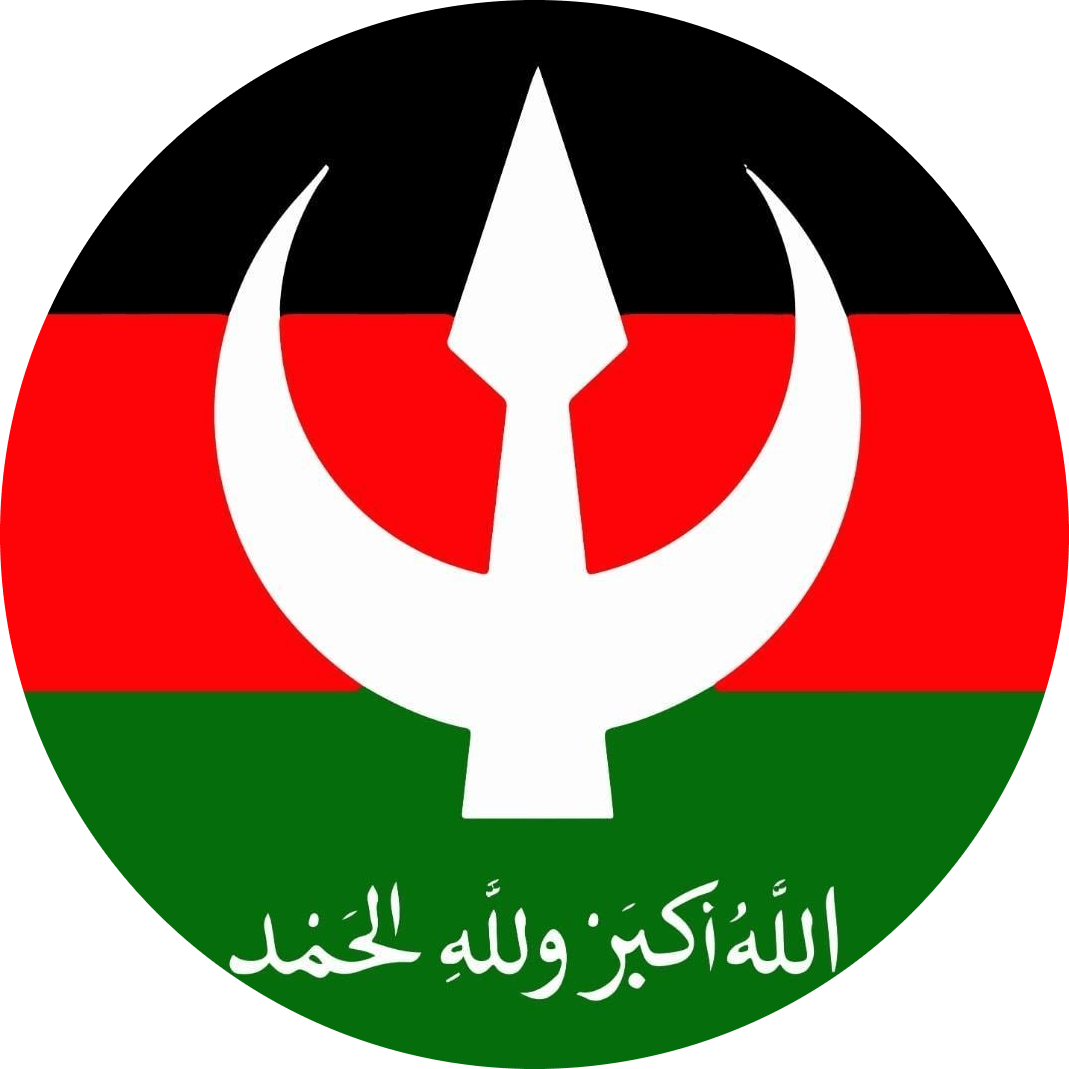
- Chairperson: Mohamed Abdallah Al-Douma (acting)
- Secretary-General: Sara Nugdallah
- Vice-chairs: Mariam al-Mahdi; Mohammed Abdullah Doma; Mohammed Ismail
- Founder: Abd al-Rahman al-Mahdi
- Founded: February 1945
- Preceded by: Ansar movement
- Headquarters: Omdurman
- Ideology: Sunni Islamism; Islamic democracy Sudanese nationalism
- Political position: Centre-right
- Religion: Sunni Islam (Ansar)
- National affiliation: National Consensus Forces
- Colours: green
- National Assembly: 3 / 426

Party flag
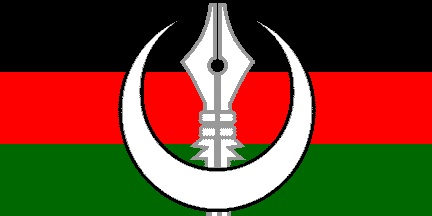

Website
- Official website

The National Umma Party (Arabic: حزب الأمة القومي, romanized: Hizb al-Umma al-qawmmy; English: Nation Party) is an Islamic political party in Sudan. It was formerly led by Sadiq al-Mahdi, who served twice as Prime Minister of Sudan, and was removed once by inter party conflict and once by a military coup. As of 2025, Mohamed Abdallah Al-Douma was the acting Chair of the party, and al-Mahdi's daughter, Mariam al-Mahdi, was one of the three vice-chairs.

== History ==
=== Foundation ===
In August 1944, Sayyid Abd al-Rahman al-Mahdi, leader of the Ansar, met with senior Congress members and tribal leaders to discuss the formation of a pro-independence political party that was not associated with Mahdism. They launched a daily newspaper, al-Umma (The Community). In February 1945 the al-Umma party was organized and the party's first secretary, Abdullah Khalil, applied for a government license. The constitution made no mention of Abd al-Rahman or of the Ansar. The only visible link to Abd al-Rahman was the party's reliance on him for funding. However, rumors held that al-Umma had been created by the government and aimed to place Abd al-Rahman in power. These rumors persisted until June 1945, when the government publicly said it would not support a Mahdist monarchy.

During his premiership, Abdalla Khalil and several senior Umma officials instigated the 1958 Sudanese coup d'état, led by General Ibrahim Abboud.

Sadiq al-Mahdi was the prominent leader of the party through much of its history. Other historic members include Abdallah Bakr Mustafa.

=== Twenty-first century ===
In 2002, 37 elected members split from the National Umma Party and formed the Umma Party (Reform and Renewal) (UPRR) led by Mubarak al Fadil al Mahdi, Sadiq al-Mahdi's first cousin. This party joined the ranks of the National Congress Party Government and stayed in power until Mubarak al-Fadil was dismissed from office. UPRR further split into four factions and later re-joined the National Umma Party.

All members of UPRR returned to the Umma National Party except for Mubarak al-Fadil due to allegations of conspiracy with South Sudan and for spreading slander and false information about colleagues in the National Umma Party and the opposition.

In 2010, the National Umma Party nominated Sadiq al-Mahdi as its presidential candidate in protest of 'electoral irregularities'. Mahdi placed fourth, and the party gained one assembly seat.

=== Sudanese Revolution ===
As a component of the National Consensus Forces (NCF) that signed Forces of Freedom and Change (FFC) charter on 1 January 2019, the Umma Party was integrated into the FFC alliance that coordinated the Sudanese Revolution and held a strong constitutional role in the 39-month transitionary period to democracy.

On 4 November 2019, according to Sudan News Agency, one of the Umma Party vice-chairs, Mariam al-Mahdi (daughter of party leader Sadiq al-Mahdi), was nominated to the Central Council of the FFC as a representative of Sudan Call, while the NCF of which the Umma Party is a member, had five other representatives on the council.

=== Sudanese civil war ===
On 24 February 2025, the party removed Major General Fadlallah Burma Nasir as its acting leader after he affixed his signature on the agreement establishing the Sudan Founding Alliance and a Government of Peace and Unity aligned with the Rapid Support Forces on 22 February. He was replaced by Mohamed Abdallah Al-Douma. However, Nasir rejected his dismissal and ordered the dissolution of the party's Presidential Institution.

== Factions ==
The most prominent Umma faction was the UPRR. Another faction of the UPRR is led by Information Minister Alzahawi Ibrahim Maalik.

Another faction is Umma Party (Collective Leadership) (UPCL), led by Dr. al Sadiq al Hadi al Mahdi, who is the nephew of Mubarak al Fadil and first cousin of Sadiq al Mahdi. Dr. al Sadiq is the son of Imam al Hadi al Mahdi who led a faction of the Umma Party that al Mahdi's faction in the 1960s. Dr al Sadiq is an adviser to the President of Sudan. UPCL became part of the government and agreed to continue cooperation with Sudan's ruling National Congress Party in the mid-interim period after 2008.

The last faction is the Federal Umma Party, led by Ahmad Babiker Nahar, ex-Secretary General of UPRR who formed his party because he was wrongfully fired by al Fadil. He became a member of Environment and Physical Development.
