= Siricio Iro Wani =

Southern Sudanese politician (1919–1985)

His Excellency Siricio Iro Wani
- سرسيو إيرو واني

Member of the Sovereignty Council
- In office 26 December 1955 – 17 November 1958
- Prime Minister: Ismail al-Azhari (1 January 1956–5 July 1956); Abdallah Khalil (5 July 1956–17 November 1958)

Personal details
- Born: 1919 Opari, Eastern Equatoria
- Died: 25 March 1985 (aged 65–66) Opari, Sudan

Siricio Iro Wani (1919–25 March 1985) was a Sudanese official and statesman from South Sudan. He served as a member of the collective body at the helm of the Sudanese state, the First Sudanese Sovereignty Council, from 1955 to 1958.

== Biography ==
=== Early life and education ===
Siricio Iro Wani was born in 1919 in Opari, Eastern Equatoria. He was educated at the Catholic Mission School in Opari, and later attended Okaru Intermediate School from 1935 to 1938. Wani was chosen for a teacher training course in 1940–1941, but instead decided to work as a storekeeper for the government in 1945, eventually transitioning to the role of an accountant.

=== Political career ===
==== Before independence ====
Wani then joined the administration and was appointed as a sub-mamur (Colonial administrator; Arabic: مأمور), serving in Wau, Bahr el Ghazal, and Torit.

As a delegate at the Juba Conference of 1947, Wani opposed the idea of Southern Sudan's participation in a unified legislative assembly in Khartoum. However, he suggested that if the South were to send representatives, they should act as observers to witness the assembly's proceedings. He also advocated for the establishment of province councils as training platforms for Southern Sudanese individuals prior to their involvement in the assembly. Despite his earlier stance, Wani was appointed as a member of the Legislative Assembly in Khartoum in 1948. In 1953, he was elected to the National Assembly of Sudan as a senator.

In 1954, Wani was chosen by the parliament to join the governor general's commission, where he was the sole representative from South Sudan. Alongside other Southern Sudanese politicians, he traveled to Cairo in November 1954 to discuss the future of Southern Sudan with Egyptian authorities. The discussions resulted in a resolution for unity between Egypt and Sudan, as well as the establishment of a separate parliament for Southern Sudan.

==== After independence ====
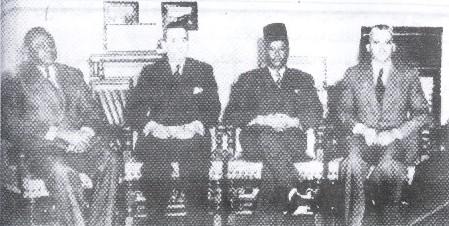
The First Sudanese Sovereignty Council (not including Ahmad Muhammad Salih), from right to left: Ahmad Muhammad Yasin, al-Dardiri Muhammad Uthman, Abd al-Fattah Muhammad al-Maghribi, and Siricio Iro Wani

After independence, Wani became a member of the first Sudanese Sovereignty Council from 26 December 1955 to 17 November 1958, the head of the state's five-man supreme council. Over time, he adopted a more moderate stance within the sovereignty council and parliament. He continued to serve under General Ibrahim Abboud's regime after 1958 coup and was appointed as the deputy speaker of the Central Council in Khartoum from 1961 to 1964. Additionally, he served as a member of the National Commission for Southern Affairs, which was formed in August 1964 to address the issues facing Southern Sudan.

== Retirement and death ==
Following the October 1964 Revolution, he retired from politics and settled in Opari in 1965. He dedicated his time to farming and played no significant active political role until his death on 25 March 1985. Wani was buried in his hometown of Opari.

His daughter, Theresa Siricio Iro Wani, was the Chairperson of Sudan African National Union.

== See also ==
- Santino Deng Teng
- Buth Diu
- Stanislaus Paysama
- Abdel Rahman Sule
- Luigi Adwok
