= Dardiri Mohammed Osman =

Sudanese judge and politician (1896–1977)

His Excellency Dardiri Mohammed Osman
- الدرديري محمد عثمان

Member of the Sovereignty Council
- In office 26 December 1955 – 17 November 1958
- Prime Minister: Ismail al-Azhari (1 January 1956–5 July 1956); Abdallah Khalil (5 July 1956–17 November 1958)

Personal details
- Born: 1896 Omdurman, Mahdist Sudan
- Died: 1977 (aged 80–81) Omdurman, Democratic Republic of Sudan
- Education: Gordon Memorial College

Dardiri Mohammed Osman (Arabic: الدرديري محمد عثمان; 1896 – 1977) was a Sudanese jurist, writer and politician who was an elected member of the 1955 Sudanese Sovereignty Council.

== Early life, education and career ==
Dardiri Mohammed Osman was born in Omdurman in 1896, where he received his early and middle education. He joined Gordon Memorial College, graduating in 1914.

Dardiri worked as a teacher in public schools until the British administration in Khartoum sought to appoint Sudanese administrators. He was appointed a Deputy warden, then warden. He also worked as a lecturer at the Police College. Dardiri was asked in 1937 in England about the reasons for the deterioration of education. He said that education after James Cree and his deputy Crawford had entrusted his command to administrative inspectors, not including a specialist, and they linked education and politics.

== Judicial career ==
When the judiciary was opened in Sudan in 1931, he was the first Sudanese to occupy the position of judge in civil courts and later the Supreme Court. He also became the Head of the Registry of Judicial Translation.

Dardiri was a judge in Port Sudan. During that time, he charged an English sailor with theft. But he saw the sailor imprisonment while the ship was ready to travel will impose punishment on others, including the owners of the ship. However, fine was not permissible for theft, but according to the law, the use of flogging was permitted for his age. So he was sentenced to be flogged which was carried out in front of Dardiri. Following the incident, the Englishmen, including the Chief Justice, boycotted Dardiri for a whole year, as they felt that the dignity of the Englishmen had been tarnished. Dardiri retired in 1952.

== Political career ==
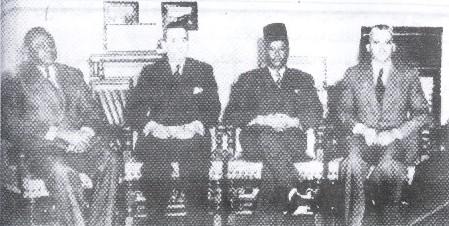
The First Sudanese Sovereignty Council (not including Ahmad Muhammad Salih), from right to left: Ahmad Muhammad Yasin, al-Dardiri Muhammad Uthman, Abd al-Fattah Muhammad al-Maghribi, and Siricio Iro Wani

Dardiri entered the political arena as secretary of the National Front, and travelled to Paris at the head of a delegation of senior Sudanese to defend the country's call for independence before the United Nations. He was elected as a member of the Governor-General's Committee in 1953, which was supervising the exercise of the powers of the Governor-General. In January 1956, when Sudan gained its independence, he was elected as a member of the Sovereignty Council.

=== Graduates' General Congress ===
When the Graduates' General Congress was established in 1938, a preparatory committee was formed, consisting of Hussein Sharif, Ahmed Othman Al-Qadi, Muhammad Ali Muhammad Salim and Dardiri. Dardiri and Muhammad Ali Selim formulated the request for the establishment of the congress in a diplomatic manner that combines preserving dignity and taking into account the status quo at the time. The first committee consisted of Hussein Sharif, Muhammad Al-Haj Al-Amin, Muhammad Ali Muhammad Selim, Ahmed Othman Al-Qadi, Ibrahim Israeli, Muhammad Al-Hassan Diab, Taha Saleh and Dardiri.

=== Al-Fajr magazine ===
Dardiri contributed to the issuance of Al-Fajr Group, which had a prominent role in the creation of the Graduates' General Congress. Arafat Muhammad Abdullah was a young Sudanese man with ambitions, far-fetched hopes, big-hearted and deep-rooted thoughts. And broad culture. He moved abroad from time to time, was selected and studied, then came to his country and met with elite graduates and made friendships that became authentic and deep over time. These friends shared his opinion, approach, and style, and at the forefront of these were Muhammad Ahmed Mahjoub, Abdel Halim Muhammad, and Youssef Mustafa Al-Tani. Al-Fajr magazine was issued in 1943. Dardiri says he contributed modestly to the issuance of Al-Fajr and encouraged the group, and he continued to do so. After the death of Arafat.

Dardiri contributed to the establishment of Voice of Sound (Arabic: صوت السودان) newspaper in 1939. He was a member of the board of directors of Al-Salam Company, which publishes the newspaper. Dardiri was the director of the Journalists Department and its presses for a period of five years. Dardiri says that the aim of establishing this newspaper was to serve the country and maintain balance in public opinion. Throughout the years of colonialism, it was a free platform in which free senior officials roamed and arrived. Its policies were purely national. This newspaper faced war from the colonialists, and its editors faced pressure, terror, and imprisonment.

=== White Flag League ===
Dardiri, during his work in eastern Sudan, worked for the White Flag League in Gedaref and Kassala, in cooperation with the Binbashi Muhammad Salih Jibril, the Yuzbashi Abdullah Bakr, the Yuzbashi Abdul Daem Muhammad and others of the tribesmen and leaders of the Sufi orders. The association has contacted all classes of the people, and Dardiri believed that if the hasty people did not rush, they would hasten the results before the movement matured, and if it were not for the unexpected betrayal that occurred from the only foreign party on which he relied fully and in whom he fully trusted. Were it not for all of that, this great movement would have had its danger and impact on hastening Sudan's independence.

=== Conciliation before the independence ===
Dardiri saw that the duty required an attempt to merge the federal parties, which are the Graduates Conference, the Republican Brotherhood, the Democratic Unionist, the Nile Valley Unity, the right wing of the Liberal Party of Sudan, and the National Islamic Front to establish the National Unionist Party. Dardiri, through the Nile Valley Unity party, supported closer relationship with Egypt. He had a prominent role in the meeting of the two Sayyids: Mohammed Uthman al-Mirghani II and Abd Al-Rahman Al-Mahdi. British policy was based on the survival of colonial rule in Sudan on contradictions, foremost of which was the traditional dispute between the Khatmiyya and Ansar sects and between the heads of these two sects. Dardiri was able bring the two gentlemen closer.

=== Sudan's independence ===
Sudan gained its independence on 1 January 1956 from the Anglo-Egyptian condominium rule, with a presidential system of government, a five-member Sovereignty Council, and a parliamentary system. The Sovereignty Council was formed and it included: Ahmad Muhammad Salih, Ahmad Muhammad Yasin (National Unionist Party), Dardiri Muhammad Uthman (Opposition Parties), Abd al-Fattah Muhammad al-Maghribi, and Siricio Iro Wani (Southern Liberal Party).
