= Ahmed Mohammed Yassin =

Sudanese politician

His Excellency Ahmed Mohammed Yassin
- أحمد محمد يس

Member of the Sovereignty Council
- In office 26 December 1955 – 17 November 1958
- Prime Minister: Ismail al-Azhari (1 January 1956–5 July 1956); Abdallah Khalil (5 July 1956–17 November 1958)

Personal details
- Born: 5 July 1913 Omdurman, Anglo-Egyptian Sudan
- Died: 27 June 2008 (aged 94)
- Party: Republican Brotherhood; National Unionist Party
- Education: Gordon Memorial College (1932)

Ahmed Mohammed Yassin (Arabic: أحمد محمد يس; 5 July 1913–27 June 2008) was a Sudanese politician who was served as a member of the collective body at the helm of the Sudanese state, the First Sudanese Sovereignty Council, from 1955 to 1958.

== Biography ==
Yassin was born in Omdurman in 1913. He joined the engineering department at Gordon Memorial College (today's University of Khartoum). He participated in the college in the first strike following the government's decision to implement a reduction in the salaries of graduates. He graduated in 1932 and was sent on a scholarship to the Military Survey School in the United Kingdom. He then worked in the Sudanese Survey Authority between 1933 and 1953.

Yassin was elected a member of the Graduates' General Congress and was chosen as an assistant secretary and cultural secretary during the period between 1936 and 1943. He was also chosen as a member of the Preparatory Committee for the Graduates' General Congress in 1937.

Yassin was one of the founders of the Republican Brotherhood Party and the National Unionist Party. He became the speaker of the National Assembly of Sudan after defeating Ahmad Muhammad Salih by 34 votes to 14.

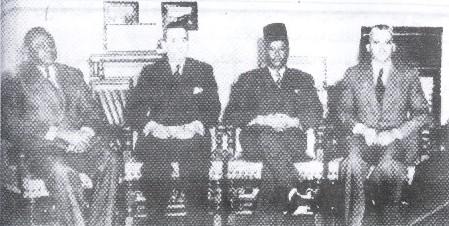
The First Sudanese Sovereignty Council (not including Ahmad Muhammad Salih), from right to left: Yassin, al-Dardiri Muhammad Uthman, Abd al-Fattah Muhammad al-Maghribi, and Siricio Iro Wani

Sudan gained its independence on 1 January 1956 from the Anglo-Egyptian condominium rule, with a presidential system of government, a five-member Sovereignty Council, and a parliamentary system. The Sovereignty Council was formed and it included: Ahmad Muhammad Salih, Yassin, Dardiri Muhammad Uthman, Abd al-Fattah Muhammad al-Maghribi, and Siricio Iro Wani. The prime minister was Ismail al-Azhari until 5 July 1956 followed by Abdallah Khalil until 17 November 1958.

The First Sudanese Sovereignty Council ended on 17 November 1958 when General Ibrahim Abboud seized power in a military coup. Ibrahim Abboud assumed the presidency, and the council was dissolved, leading to a change in Sudan's governance structure from a parliamentary system to military rule.

After the coup, Yassin chaired the Central Council Commission for the South which was tasked to look into the causes of the First Sudanese Civil War and the essence of the "South Sudan question" in general, and suggest reforms.
