= Ahmad Muhammad Salih =

Sudanese poet (1898–1973)

His Excellency Ahmad Muhammad Salih
- أحمد محمد صالح
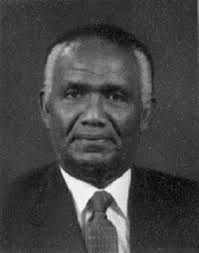
- Born: 1898; Omdurman, Mahdist State
- Died: 1973 (aged 74–75); Omdurman, Sudan
- Education: Gordon Memorial College (1914)
- Writing career
- Language: Arabic and English
- Notable work: National anthem of Sudan

Member of the Sovereignty Council
- In office 26 December 1955 – 17 November 1958
- Prime Minister: Ismail al-Azhari (1 January 1956–5 July 1956); Abdallah Khalil (5 July 1956–17 November 1958)

Personal details
- Party: National Unionist Party

Ahmad Muhammad Salih (Arabic: أحمد محمد صالح //; 1898–1973, Omdurman) was a prominent Sudanese poet and politician. A member of the Sudanese Sovereignty Council, he is best known for being the author of the Sudanese national anthem.

== Early life and education ==
Ahmad Muhammad Salih was born in Omdurman in 1898. He studied at Gordon Memorial College (today's University of Khartoum), where he graduated in 1914. He was known for his fondness for Arabic and English poetry, as he memorized many of the poems issued in these two languages that fell into his hands.

== Career ==
He worked as a teacher after graduating from college, and progressed in the career ladder until he rose to the position of a school superintendent (principal). He also worked as an employee in the Ministry of Education and rose in its administrative positions until he became a deputy director of knowledge. He also worked as a teacher at Gordon Memorial College in Khartoum.

=== Politics ===
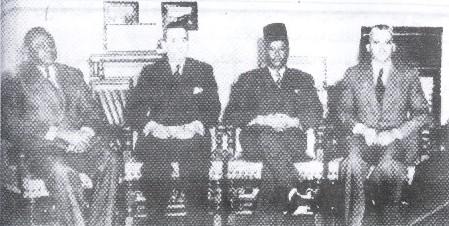
The First Sudanese Sovereignty Council (not including Ahmad Muhammad Salih), from right to left: Ahmad Muhammad Yasin, al-Dardiri Muhammad Uthman, Abd al-Fattah Muhammad al-Maghribi, and Siricio Iro Wani

Saleh was known for his patriotic poetry against colonialism during the period of condominium rule in Sudan, and he reached the point of clashing with the British administration in several matters and the decisions it imposed on the country, especially when he refused to obey an order from the administration requiring school teachers to wear the jubbah and kaftan instead of the French uniform. He was a capable orator who preached in both Arabic and English.

Sudan gained its independence on 1 January 1956 from the Anglo-Egyptian condominium rule, with a presidential system of government, a five-member Sovereignty Council, and a parliamentary system. The Sovereignty Council was formed and it included: Ahmad Muhammad Salih, Ahmad Muhammad Yasin (National Unionist Party), Dardiri Muhammad Uthman (Opposition Parties), Abd al-Fattah Muhammad al-Maghribi, and Siricio Iro Wani (Southern Liberal Party). The council was dissolved after the 1958 Sudanese coup d'état.

== Literary works ==
Salih published his collection of poetry With the Free, in Khartoum in 1998 by the National Authority for Culture and Information, and his poetry was distinguished by the power of expression and its sobriety. The Sudanese poet Abdullah Muhammad Omar al-Banna said about him that he was "the most poetic of Sudan," while his supporters and admirers of his poetry called him Professor al-Sha'ir (or Professor of Poetry). Ahmed Mohamed Saleh has preserved in his poetry the origins of Al-Khalili performances.

=== National anthem ===
Among his most famous poems is the poem "We are the soldiers of God, the soldiers of the nation," which was published in his collection With the Free, and later became the national anthem of Sudan and Sudan Defence Force, the nucleus of the current Sudanese Armed Forces anthem. Then the first four verses were chosen to form the poetic text of the music of the Sudanese Republican Peace. During independence, which was composed and composed by Colonel Ahmed Morgan, and later became the Sudanese national anthem.
