= Abdel Fattah al-Maghrabi =

Sudanese politician (1898–1985)

His Excellency Abdel Fattah al-Maghrabi
- عبد الفتاح المغربي

First President of the Republic of Sudan, Chairman of the Sovereignty Council,
- In office 26 December 1955 – 17 November 1958
- Prime Minister: Ismail al-Azhari (1 January 1956–5 July 1956); Abdallah Khalil (5 July 1956–17 November 1958)

Personal details
- Born: Abdel Fattah Muhammad al-Maghrabi; 1898
- Died: 1985 (aged 86–87) Newton Abbot, Devon, England
- Spouse: 1. Lutfia Shoaib 2. Phillippa Maghrabi

Abdel Fattah al-Maghrabi (Arabic: عبد الفتاح المغربي //; 1898 – 1985) was a Sudanese official and statesman. He served as the chairman of the collective body at the helm of the Sudanese state, the First Sudanese Supreme Sovereignty Council, from 1955 to 1958 and was the first President of the Republic of Sudan after British rule.

== Biography ==
=== Early life and education ===
Abdel Fattah Muhammad al-Maghrabi was born in 1898. Abdelfattah al-Maghrabi's father, Mohamed Mustafa, held the position of Chief Clerk of Dongola Province, which was bestowed upon him by the Mahdi. In 1889, following his forces' defeat by General Grenfell at Battle of Toski, the Khalifa, who succeeded the Mahdi, sought out individuals to blame and subsequently imprisoned Mohamed Mustafa. However, Mohamed Mustafa managed to secure his release by composing a poem consisting of 40 verses that praised the Khalifa.

al-Maghrabi studied at American University in Beirut as part of the first student delegation to study outside Sudan, and graduated with a PhD in mathematics. He then worked as a mathematics lecturer at Gordon Memorial College after his graduation.

=== Political career ===
al-Maghrabi was appointed in 1951 as the only member of the opposition in the Legislative Assembly that was discussing the matter of the country’s constitution.

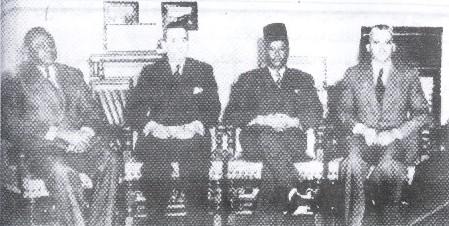
The First Sudanese Sovereignty Council (not including Ahmad Muhammad Salih), from right to left: Ahmad Muhammad Yasin, al-Dardiri Muhammad Uthman, Abd al-Fattah Muhammad al-Maghribi, and Siricio Iro Wani

After independence, al-Maghrabi became the chairman of the first Sudanese Sovereignty Council from 26 December 1955 to 17 November 1958, the head of the state's five-man supreme council. The prime minister was Ismail al-Azhari until 5 July 1956 followed by Abdallah Khalil until 17 November 1958. The First Sudanese Sovereignty Council ended on 17 November 1958 when General Ibrahim Abboud seized power in a military coup. Ibrahim Abboud assumed the presidency, and the council was dissolved, leading to a change in Sudan's governance structure from a parliamentary system to military rule.

=== Personal life and death ===
al-Maghrabi married twice, his first wife Lutfia Shoaib was from a well-known Egyptian military and political family linked to Jamal Abdel Nasser whose parents had moved to the Sudan during the rule of King Farooq of Egypt. He had two children with Lutfia, a girl named Buthaina al-Maghrebi and a boy named Abbas al-Maghrebi. Buthaina would eventually marry Brigadier General Hussein Ali Karrar who later became the Military Governor of the Blue Nile State in Sudan. His second wife was Phillippa Maghrabi who he married in 1937. She was a British nurse working for the Sudanese Health Services Authority and he had no children with her. Between 1937 and 1948, He and Phillippa resided in Gereif, which was located five miles outside of Khartoum along the banks of the Blue Nile. During their time there, Phillippa undertook the role of an informal district nurse in the neighboring villages. She wrote a memoirs documenting the history of Khartoum in a book called Early days at Gereif.

al-Maghribi died in 1985 in Newton Abbot in Devon, England.
