= Torit mutiny =

1955 insurrection in South Sudan

- Part of the First Sudanese Civil War
Date	August 18–30, 1955
Location	Equatoria, Anglo-Egyptian Sudan
Result	Government victory: Uprising put down; Beginning of the armed insurgency

Belligerents
Anglo-Egyptian Sudan; Supported by: Egypt	Rebel elements of the Equatoria Corps

Commanders and leaders
(Anglo-Egyptian Sudan) Ismail al-Azhari; (Anglo-Egyptian Sudan) Knox Helm; (Anglo-Egyptian Sudan) Saleh Abdel-Mageed (Sudanese commander)	Daniel Jumi Tongun; Marko Rume

Units involved
Royal Air Force	

Casualties and losses
361 dead	75 dead; 300 executed
- Uncertain

The Torit mutiny was an insurrection that took place in Anglo-Egyptian Sudan during August 1955. It began in and around Torit, Equatoria, but quickly spread to other southern cities such as Juba, Yei, and Maridi.

The rebellion began when a group of officers from No. 2 Company, Equatoria Corps, led by Daniel Jumi Tongun and Marko Rume, both of the Karo ethnic group, mutinied against the British administration on August 18. The immediate causes of the mutiny were a trial of a southern member of the national assembly and an allegedly false telegram urging northern administrators in the South to oppress southerners. Although the insurrection was suppressed, it ushered in a period of instability characterized by guerrilla activity, banditry, and political tensions between north and south that eventually escalated to full-scale civil war with the Anyanya rebellion in 1963.

== Background ==
The Cairo Agreement led to the Sudan Self-Government Statute of 1953 and paved the way for elections to the first Sudanese parliament in Khartoum that same year. In this parliament the South was allotted only 22 seats, while the Northern parties elected 75 members for a total of 97. Because Southerners were a minority, they were always outvoted in parliamentary debates. In those elections, the NUP won most of the seats in the new House of Representatives and its leader, Ismail al-Azhari, became Prime Minister. Al-Azhari's accession generated fears among Southern politicians in Khartoum because of his advocacy of Nile Valley unity.

As the Sudanese began to exercise their rights to self-determination and independence, the different political parties sought to gain control of the administrative machinery. On February 20, 1954, a Sudanization Committee was appointed and ended up recommending some 80% to 90% of posts for Sudanization "at an early date." Again, the southerners were excluded on this committee, so they began to feel cheated by Sudanization. After a protest organized by the Liberal Party in Malakal on August 27 demanding southern officials be promoted to higher posts, a NUP member sent a memo to al-Azhari warning him that if his party does not come to a fair deal with the southerners the situation in the south would lead to chaos and would instigate political intrigues by the opposition and the communists. Despite this, al-Azhari only gave the southerners 6 seats out of 800 on the Sudanization Committee. All this aroused the anger of the southerners, regardless of their social class, accusing the northerners of deceiving them and wanting to establish a new colonial administration.

In June and July 1955, as Sudanization continued, new northern managers arrived at Nzara to replace British administrators and technical staff. The new management quickly laid off three hundred workers at the industrial complex en masse without regard for economic and political repercussions. When the liberal Elia Kuze visited Yambio on July 26 to demonstrate his support for the workers, he was arrested, tried and sentenced to seven years in prison for civil disobedience and attempted popular mobilization. The Nzara workers protested against this and in response the army, police and northern landowners fired on the mob, killing eight civilians.

During the Sudanization Program, soldiers of the Equatoria Corps and their counterparts in Bahr al-Ghazal and Upper Nile similarly felt cheated when British and Egyptian officers were replaced not by southern but by northern officers. The Southern soldiers constituted the rank and file, with only a few NCOs, the highest rank Southerners held was second lieutenant, and only a few held this rank before the Torit mutiny.

On October 26, 1954, the Liberal Party organized a conference in Juba to demand federal status for the south, stating that only federalism could provide safeguards for them in an independent Sudan. After that, al-Azhari toured the southern region seeking to negotiate and gain the support of the southern parties for his new government, but wherever he went he was hostilely received by the locals. The most serious incident occurred in Malakal, where al-Azhari narrowly escaped being killed by a southern official armed with a knife. Despite the negative and discouraging reception, the Prime Minister promised to raise local wages to match those in the north to calm the situation. Once in Juba, al-Azhari met with the main provincial administrators, civil servants, members of the organized forces (army, police and prisons) and merchants at the Juba Hall, where he delivered a speech emphasizing the unity of the Nile Valley, which caused a crowd to leave the hall in protest. Daniel Jumi Tongun, a veteran politician, was the first to leave, prompting him to be immediately accused as an agitator and traitor.

In turn, the tour worsened north–south relations and entrenched al-Azhari's image as an "enemy of the people" among South Sudanese. Meanwhile, al-Azhari and his delegation acknowledged that a rift still existed between the peoples of the South and North, but they saw the southerners as rebellious and subversive elements that should be dealt with "an iron fist".

As the state of insecurity continued to deteriorate in the South, rumors spread among the public and the organized forces about the Sudan government's plans to dissolve the Equatoria Corps. This southern battalion that had fought against the Germans and Italians in World War II was one of the greatest symbols of prestige and honor for the people of the South. The rumors originated from an alleged telegram from Prime Minister Ismail al-Azhari in which he threatened the administrators of the three southern provinces with disbanding their military corps and prosecuting anyone who did not follow his orders. Currently, it is considered that the telegram was forged and, although there are theories, its real origin remains unknown. However, this false message was circulated far and wide in Equatoria: Yambio, Meridi, Nzara, Yei, and Torit all received copies. Indignation spread among the soldiers in the south, this being the prelude to a major mutiny.

== Uprising ==
Following the "arrow incident" on August 7, 1955, in which a soldier fired an arrow that missed a northern officer in Torit, multiple southern officers were arrested, including Lieutenant Saturlino, who was accused of being part of a conspiracy. A week later, the Khartoum government ordered the evacuation of the officers' wives and children, which southern troops interpreted as a prelude to a plan to exterminate South Sudanese soldiers. On August 14, the No. 2 Company of the Equatoria Corps was ordered "to proceed to Khartoum to take part, as representatives of the Southern Corps in a march past to celebrate the evacuation of foreign troops from the Sudan." However, this deepened the fears of the officers and men from the south, for after Lt. M.T. Taffeng was arrested, he claimed that the celebration was a lie and that the move to Khartoum was a trap to kill them.

On August 16, the Sudanese government voted unanimously to complete the evacuation of foreign troops and consecrate its full independence, scheduled for January 1, 1956. At the same time, members of the Equatoria Corps in Torit were preparing to go into action. Four Southern NCOs (Lance Corporals Mutek, Akeo, and Lubega, and Corporal Matiang) held a meeting with the original plan to provoke widespread riots in all the major cities of Sudan with the aim of getting rid of the northern troops and merchants and then proclaiming the independence of the South. The conspirators also believed that British troops from East Africa would come to their aid in the event of a mutiny, which was not the case. The plans were given to Rume and he to Tongun. Tongun warned Torit's soldiers against premature execution and advised the NCOs to wait for the return of key members of parliament from the south, such as Benjamin Lwoki and Buth Dui, to brief them on the political situation in the country prior to the rebellion.

On August 18, when Torit's troops were told to board the trucks for Khartoum, they refused and immediately attacked the northern officers and stormed the armory to secure weapons and ammunition. The mutineers killed the northern officers, burned their houses, and looted their property. News of what happened in Torit spread and another 190 troops rebelled in Juba, Yei, Yambio and Meridi. In the first wave of fighting, 75 southerners and 361 northerners were killed. Once the rebels took Torit, they contacted officials in Nairobi and sent a telegram requesting reinforcements, but received no response. Desperate for heavy weapons and ammunition, they continued to send messages to Nairobi, where the British finally responded after the fourth telegram but condemned the mutiny.

On August 19, the Governor of Khartoum sent a telegram to Cairo explaining the situation in Western Equatoria. He reported that soldiers in Meridi had mutinied and that civilians were being attacked, and claimed that the governors of Wau and Malakal urgently needed troops to help them. Khartoum had six companies ready to put down the rebellion, but Sudan Airways could not quickly transport them there, so Egypt was asked for help. The telegram concluded that four more companies were needed to fly to Juba to protect the lives of British officials, other foreigners and Arab Sudanese living outside Juba.

On August 20–21, at the expense of the Torit rebels, the Juba and Mongalla rebels devised a plan to provoke the military intervention of the KAR in support of the uprising from Uganda. Lieutenant Albino Tongun was ordered to command two companies to Ngangala, where a contingent of the KAR from Nimule was based, but the plan failed.

Al-Azhari sent a telegram promising the Torit rebels asking for dialogue and promising not to retaliate and to investigate the causes of the mutiny if they surrender within 24 hours. The rebels did not give up and responded with another telegram demanding the withdrawal of the northern troops. On top of this, the rebels made one last desperate attempt to gain outside support by trying to get the attention of the United Nations. Sir Knox Helm, still head of state, intervened and ordered the RAF to transport 8,000 Northern troops to the South and sent T. W. H. Luce, former Lieutenant Governor of Equatoria, with a proposal of peace terms to the rebels. Although the mandate of the Anglo-Egyptian forces in Sudan had expired, this military assistance was not disinterested. The British demanded from Khartoum a series of conditions in return for RAF support, including safeguarding British interests in the Suez Canal to ensure lasting British influence in an independent Sudan.

In addition to the military assistance, Helm sent a telegram similar to the one al-Azhari had sent earlier demanding surrender and negotiations. Helm's message had more effect than al-Azhari's, making it clear that the British had no intention of helping the southerners. On August 27, the rebels surrendered at Torit, the city that started the munity. The next day Mongalla also surrendered. The full surrender was signed on August 30. Some rebel elements did not accept the surrender, so they fled to the hills on the Uganda-Sudan border and started a small-scale insurgency. The day after the surrender, government troops entered Torit and arrested those who had surrendered. Breaking promises of pardon, the rebels received a summary trial and 300 of them were executed.
