= Haider Ahmed Dafalla =

His Excellency Honorable Chief justice Haider Ahmed Dafalla

15th Chief Justice of Republic of Sudan
- In office 23 April 2014 – 2019
- Appointed by: Nominated & Recommended by the national commission for judicial Services Presidential Decree No. 23/2014; .
- Preceded by: Mohamed Hamed Ahmed Abo Sien .2014
- Incumbent
- Assumed office 23 April 2014
- Deputy: First Deputy .Justice Mahajoub AL Amin Alfkei Abdalla Second Deputy . Justice . Abdul Majeed Idriess

Personal details
- Born: 1 January 1952 (age 74) Republic of Sudan
- Education: LL.B, LL.M. PhD. Cairo university 1983.

Haider Ahmed Dafalla was the Chief Justice of Sudan and president of the Supreme Court of Sudan, starting in 2014. He was the highest-ranking and presiding judge in the Supreme Court, and also head of administrative functions.

Dafalla was nominated and recommended by the national commission for judicial services to the chief justice post, as a Chief Justice is responsible for the allocation of cases that deal with important law matters. He was the 15th Chief Justice of the Republic of Sudan since January 1956. In April 2014, the president of the Republic of Sudan appointed Haider Ahmed Dafalla by Presidential decree No. 23/2014 as Chief justice. He took office on 23 April 2014.

== Education ==
Dafalla's Academic Qualifications are: LL.B, Cairo University – Khartoum branch "First Class" 1976. LL.M, Cairo University "First Class" 1983. Cairo -Egypt.PHD "Law" – Cairo –Egypt May 1989. Beside a Diploma in Islamic Shariah Law "First Class" 1982. Cairo -Egypt.

== Endorsements for Chief Justice, positions ==
Before Dafalla became Chief Justice of Sudan, he started his career as a legal assistant January 1977, then he was promoted to Second Grade District Judge December 1979. In November, 1981 he was promoted to District Judge First class and to Public Court Judge (it was named earlier Province Court Judge) in October 1986. Then he was promoted to Appeal Court Judge March 1992 and then finally promoted to Supreme Court Judge 5 March 2000. He was appointed by Presidential decree No. 23/2014 to Chief justice of the Republic of Sudan on 23 April 2014. Professional background Since (1977–1984) He served during this tenure in all courts hierarchy "Civil, Criminal & Sharia Courts" he served as a judge in both "Khartoum State & Red Sea State"; he also served as assistant registrar for court administration and judges affair 1984. Between (1984– 1992) He has been a member of the Technical & Scientific Research Bureau Administration; he had been seconded to Qatar from 1996– 2001; he has assigned to chair Khartoum North judicial administration (2006–2009). He was director of the training department of Sudan judiciary, member of judicial inspection (2000). He has then reappointed Director-General of Technical & Scientific Research Bureau Administration until promoted to Republic of Sudan Chief Justice. Notable Potencies – Associated Law lecturer for many Sudanese Universities. – Associated lecturer to Qatar University. – Associated lecturer of private international law.

== Studies and publications ==
1. – An introduction to Law
1. – An illustration to Sudanese Civil Procedure Code ( Part I & II)
1. – Private International Law .
2. – Fundamental of Commercial & Civil Pleadings – comparative study.
3. – Implementation of judicial rules in Quatrain Procedures Act.
4. – An introduction to comparative Law of Evidence .
5. – An illustration to Qatar Criminal Procedure Code .
6. – An illustration to Legal terminologies.

== See also ==
- Nemat Abdullah Khair - Chief Justice during the 2019 Sudanese transition to democracy
