= National Human Rights Commission (Sudan) =

Agency overview
- Jurisdiction: Sudan
- Agency executive: Hurriya Ismail

The Sudanese National Human Rights Commission has been headed by Hurriya Ismail, appointed by former president Omar al-Bashir, since March 2018 or earlier and continued under her leadership during the 2019 Sudanese transition to democracy.

== Creation ==
The National Human Rights Commission (NHRC) has existed since March 2018 or earlier. Hurriya Ismail (also: Hurria) was appointed as its head by former president Omar al-Bashir, wanted by the International Criminal Court for crimes against humanity carried out during the War in Darfur.

== Sudanese Revolution ==
On 24 September 2019, just a few days after civilian prime minister Abdalla Hamdok's decree initiating the creation of the Khartoum massacre investigation committee, Hurriya Ismail, head of the NHRC, stated that 85 people had been killed during the 3 June 2019 Khartoum massacre and 400 had been injured. She stated that the 85 people were killed by live bullets. In relation to Sudanese doctors' estimates of the rape of 70 women and men during the massacre, Ismail listed "16 allegations of sexual violence, 9 cases of rape and sexual violence" and stated that the NHRC had not received direct complaints from victims.

The newly appointed Chief Justice of Sudan and head of the Sudanese judiciary, Nemat Abdullah Khair, and Attorney-General of Sudan, Tag el-Sir el-Hibir, both appeared publicly with Ismail in late October 2019 and stated their intention to cooperate with Ismail and the NHRC on human rights protection and prosecutions for human rights violations committed during the al-Bashir era and during the Sudanese Revolution.
