= Sudanese Sovereignty Council (1955–1958) =

Leadership of Sudan (Dec 1955 – Nov 1958)

Their Excellency Sudanese Sovereignty Council
- مجلس السيادة السوداني
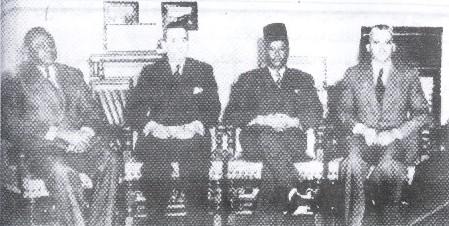
- The 1955 Sovereignty Council (not including Ahmad Muhammad Salih), from right to left: Ahmad Muhammad Yasin, Dardiri Mohammed Osman, Abd al-Fattah Muhammad al-Maghribi, and Siricio Iro Wani

Head of State of Sudan
- In office 26 December 1955 – 17 November 1958
- Prime Minister: Ismail al-Azhari (26 December 1955 – 5 July 1956); Abdallah Khalil (5 July 1956 – 17 November 1958)
- Preceded by: Knox Helm and Muhammad Ahmad Abu Rannat
- Succeeded by: Ibrahim Abboud

The First Sudanese Sovereignty Council (26 December 1955 – 17 November 1958), or Supreme Council or Commission of Sovereignty, was established in the context of Sudan's struggle for independence and the subsequent transition to self-rule. Sudan, formerly under joint British-Egyptian rule, gained independence on 1 January 1956. The council was formed on 26 December 1955 to oversee the governance of the Republic of Sudan during this transitional period. The members of the council included Abd al-Fattah Muhammad al-Maghribi, al-Dardiri Muhammad Uthman (National Umma Party), Ahmad Muhammad Yasin (National Unionist Party), Ahmad Muhammad Salih (NUP), and Siricio Iro Wani (Southern Liberal Party). The prime minister was Ismail al-Azhari until 5 July 1956 followed by Abdallah Khalil until the 17 November 1958 Sudanese coup d'état.

During its tenure, the council faced several challenges, including the First Sudanese Civil War, which lasted from 1955 to 1972. The conflict erupted shortly before Sudan's independence and continued throughout the council's existence. The civil war was fought primarily between the Sudanese government and southern rebels seeking greater autonomy and resource control. It was resolved through the Addis Ababa Agreement in 1972, which established the Southern Sudan Autonomous Region.

The council also grappled with issues related to Sudan's sovereignty and its position in the international arena. Sudan was navigating the complexities of the Cold War, with competing interests from global powers. Sudanese politicians held differing views on decolonisation, independence, and the balance between maintaining sovereignty and accepting foreign aid. The Umma Party, for example, saw accepting aid from the United States as necessary for protecting Sudanese sovereignty, while others had varying perspectives.

The First Sudanese Sovereignty Council ended on 17 November 1958 when General Ibrahim Abboud seized power in a military coup. Ibrahim Abboud assumed the presidency, and the council was dissolved, leading to a change in Sudan's governance structure from a parliamentary system to military rule.
