= 1956 Transitional Constitution of Sudan =

Constitution of Sudan

On 1 January 1956, Sudan gained independence from British-Egyptian rule without the rival political parties' having agreed on the form and content of a permanent constitution of Sudan. The nation had implemented the 1953 Self-Government Statute as a provisional constitution; however, political factions had yet to reach a consensus on a permanent constitutional framework, committing only to its future development and ratification. Instead, an interim constitution was adopted to provide a framework for governance during its early years as a sovereign state.

The 1956 Transitional Constitution of Sudan represented Sudan’s first step in forming an independent legal and political structure. The constitution established a Westminster-style government with a bicameral parliament, cabinet, and independent judiciary. The constitution also included fundamental rights, such as freedom of religion, opinion, and association, and the right to a constitutional remedy.

The transitional constitution allocated significant powers to the executive branch, positioning the Prime Minister at the centre of governance. The House of Representatives had the authority to nominate the Prime Minister, who was then confirmed to oversee the administration. This structure highlighted a parliamentary system that sought to balance power while maintaining the fledgling nation's political stability. The document also established a five-member Supreme Council, which elected by parliament and served as the head of state.
