= Muhammad Ahmad Abu Rannat =

Sudanese judge (1902–1977)

Sayyid Muhammad Ahmad Abu Rannat
- محمد أحمد أبو رنات
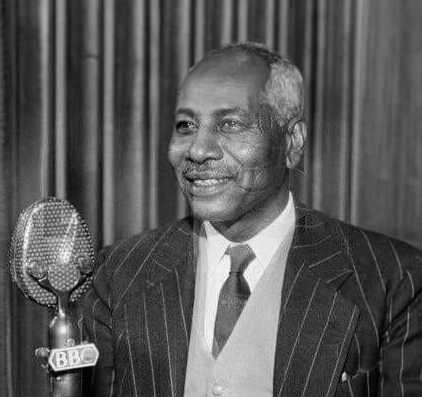
- Abu Rannat in 1960, during a BBC interview with Tayeb Salih

Chief Justice of Sudan
- In office July 1955 – 1964
- President: Sovereignty Council; Ibrahim Abboud (1958–1964)
- Prime Minister: Ismail al-Azhari (1956); Abdallah Khalil (1956–1958); Ibrahim Abboud (1958–1964)
- Preceded by: William O'Brien Lindsay
- Succeeded by: Babiker Awadalla

Governor-General of Sudan
- Acting
- In office 12 December 1955 – 1 January 1956
- Prime Minister: Ismail al-Azhari
- Preceded by: Knox Helm
- Succeeded by: Office abolished

Personal details
- Born: 1902 En Nahud, North Kordofan, Anglo-Egyptian Sudan
- Died: 1977 (aged 74–75)

Justice Sayyid Muhammed Ahmad Abu Rannat (Arabic: محمد أحمد أبو رنات, 1902 – 1977) was as a Sudanese jurist who served as the chief justice of Sudan from Sudan's independence until 1964. His work influenced the development of legal systems in post-colonial Africa, particularly in Sudan and Nigeria, with efforts to reconcile Islamic, customary, and Western legal principles.

== Biography ==
Abu Rannat was born in En Nahud, North Kordofan, in 1902, into the Shaigiya tribe. He was educated Gordon Memorial College in Khartoum between 1917 and 1920 as an accountant. He studied law in 1935 at Gordon Memorial College. and graduated in 1938. He was appointed a judge in 1943.

Abu Rannat served as the chief justice of Sudan from July 1955 until 1964. Abu Rannat acted as the Sudan's governor-general from 12 December 1955 until the independence on 1 January 1965.

In 1973 he was chosen to be the chairman of the Civil Service Appeals Committee.

In the late 1950s, Abu Rannat chaired a panel of jurists appointed by Northern Region, Nigeria to examine and reform the region's legal and judicial systems. This panel's work culminated in the drafting of the 1958 Penal Code, which sought to harmonize Islamic, customary, and British colonial laws into a unified legal framework suitable for the Northern Region.

On 17 November 1959, President Ibrahim Abboud announced a committee led by Abu Rannat to reform local government. Their recommendations were largely adopted in the 1960 Provincial Administration Act, which created rural, municipal, and provincial councils with advisory roles on local issues. On 1 July 1961, Abboud announced the formation of a second Constitutional Commission, again led by Abu Rannat, to propose elections for local councils and create a Central Legislative Council. The commission recommended expanding voting rights in local councils, lowering residency requirements, and limiting appointed members to no more than half of the total.

Abu Ranant also help updating the Police Law.

Abu Rannat authored scholarly works, including the article "The Relationship Between Islamic and Customary Law in the Sudan," published in the Journal of African Law in 1960.

Abu Rannat was involved in international legal affairs. He was a member of the United Nations Sub-Commission on Prevention of Discrimination and Protection of Minorities.

Abu Rannat died in 1977.
