= Tag el-Sir el-Hibir =

Sudanese lawyer

Attorney-General of Sudan
- In office 10 October 2019 – 02 January 2022
- Prime Minister: Abdalla Hamdok
- Preceded by: Office established
- Succeeded by: Office abolished

Personal details
- Born: 1948 (age 77–78)
- Education: University of Khartoum
- Occupation: lawyer

Tag el-Sir el-Hibir (also: Taj, El Sir, Alsir, El Hibir, Alhibir, born in 1948) is a Sudanese lawyer who became the Attorney-General of Sudan on 10 October 2019 during the 2019 Sudanese transition to democracy.

== Childhood and education ==
El-Hibir was born in 1948 in Khilaila, a village north of Khartoum, to a family that runs local Islamic seminaries. He studied law at the University of Khartoum.

== Legal experience ==
El-Hibir worked in the Attorney-General's Office, in the General Attorney Council and the Laws Committee. In the 1970s, el-Hibir was an assistant legal counsel. He helped the Law Commission of Sudan prepare Volume 4 of an updated compendium of Sudanese law. He worked in other lawyers' cabinets and then open his own office.

El-Hibir was a member of an indictment council preparing a case in June 2019 against members of the previous government involved in the 1989 Sudanese coup d'état. Lawyers filed the case in May 2019, shortly after the April 2019 coup d'état that overthrew president Omar al-Bashir and prior to the Transitional Military Council transferring power to a mixed civilian–military Sovereignty Council several months later. The indictment council consisted of el-Hibir, Kamal el-Jazouli and Mohamed el-Hafiz. On 24 June 2019, the council questioned Sadiq al-Mahdi, the former prime minister overthrown by Omar al-Bashir in the 1989 coup, retired Lt-Generals Mahdi Babu Nimer and Fadlallah Burma.

== Political neutrality ==
El-Hibir is seen by lawyer Kamal Jizouli as broadly supporting democracy with no specific political preferences. Jizouli says that el-Hibir was an active member of the Lawyers' Trade Union during the 1985 protests that led to the 1985 Sudanese coup d'état that overthrew president Gaafar Nimeiry, "fight[ing] for what is right, [but with] no partisan affiliations of any sort".

== Attorney General ==
On 10 October 2019 el-Hibir became Attorney-General of Sudan by decree, together with Nemat Abdullah Khair who became the Chief Justice of Sudan.

On 30 October, el-Hibir held a press conference with Hurriya Ismail, the head of the National Human Rights Commission. El-Hibir and Ismail promised that prosecutions would be carried out for the killing of peaceful protestors during the September–October 2013 protests, for the 3 June 2019 Khartoum massacre (investigated in the Khartoum massacre investigation), and for any other human rights violations during the Omar al-Bashir era. El-Hibir called for Sudan to ratify the United Nations Convention against Torture which it signed on 4 June 1986.
