= Abdel Rahman Sule =

Southern Sudanese politician

Abdel Rahman Sule is a South Sudanese politician who was one of the founders of the Liberal Party, officially registered as the "Southern Party" in 1953, the main party in Southern Sudan in the years immediately before and after independence in 1956.

Abdel Rahman Sule belonged to the Bari people. He has been described as a farmer and as a trader. Sule was the son of a village chief. Speaking of his childhood, he said: "The effendi who came around our village to kill elephants were Muslims. I used to see what these people were doing. That is how I became a Muslim. In 1927, I was caught with arms from Ethiopia. By then I was already a Muslim. But I was very aware of my African-ness. When I was a kid, if I was woken late in the morning by my father, he would say 'if it had been in the days of the Ansars you would have been taken'. My father always woke me up early so that in his words I am not taken by the Ansars".

Sule was at the forefront of pro-federalist politics in the 1940s and 1950s. Sule, Stanislaus Paysama and Buth Diu founded the Southern Sudanese Political Movement in 1951, with the goals of achieving full independence for Sudan, with special treatment for southern Sudan. The southerners were excluded from the Political Parties agreement with the British colonial authorities, but in 1953 registered the Southern Party, later renamed the Liberal Party. The party was supported by almost all southern intellectuals and by the majority of southern people. Although also open to northerners, none joined. The new party was led by Benjamin Lwoki and funded by Abdel Rahman Sule and Fahal Ukanda, both Muslims. Sule was known as "The Patron" of the party. Sule's Juba branch of the Southern Party was particularly active in recruiting future southern politicians. After the military crack-down in 1960, Sule went into exile and helped lead the south Sudan resistance movement from abroad.
