= Buth Diu =

Sudanese politician (died 1972)

Sir Both Diu
- Born: Fangak, South Sudan
- Died: c. 1972
- Education: Both Diu was working as a house servant of the British District Commissioner in Khartoum in the years before Sudan independence. With no formal schooling, he taught himself to read, write and type. Thereafter, he won the post of interpreter, founded a political party, and was elected to parliament in Khartoum.
- Occupation: Politician
- Known for: Early political leader from Southern Sudan and becoming the first Nuer politician to be MP, Minister and own a political party.
- Title: Sir
- Political party: Liberal party

Both Diu (d. c. 1972) or Böth Diew was a politician who was one of the leaders of the Liberal Party in Sudan in the years before and after independence in 1956. His party represented the interests of the southerners. Although in favor of a federal system under which the south would have its own laws and administration, Both Diu was not in favor of southern secession. As positions hardened during the drawn-out First Sudanese Civil War (1955–1972) his compromise position was increasingly discredited.

== Early years ==
Both Diu was born and raise in Fangak, South Sudan. He belong to Nuer ethnic group. Both Diu did not attend formal education, but managed to obtain a job as a house servant of the British District Commissioner in Khartoum. He taught himself English and learned to read and write and type. With these skills, he became interpreter for the District Commissioner, an influential post. By 1947 he was a local government official.

== Southern representative ==
After the Second World War the mood in Britain was to give the Anglo-Egyptian Sudan independence of both Britain and Egypt. Both Diu was one of the southern leaders who attended a conference held at Juba on 12–13 June 1947 to discuss the recommendations of an earlier conference held in Khartoum at which it had been decided that the south and north of Sudan should be united in one country. Southerners were (and are) very different ethnically and culturally from the people of northern Sudan, but the rationale was that Sudan was huge but poor, and if divided both parts would be extremely weak. No southerners had attended the Khartoum conference.

At the Juba conference, Both Diu said that although northerners claimed they did not want to dominate the South, there must be safeguards. Northerners should not be allowed to settle on land in the south without permission, should not interfere in local government in the south and should not be allowed in law to call a southerner a slave. However, Diu was not in favor of separation. He said the government should select representatives from the south who would go to the North to study and to participate in legislation, finance, and administration. He said that Arabic should be introduced into southern schools without delay so they could catch up to the north.

Both Diu formed an "Upper Nile Political Association" in Upper Nile province. The Governor-General of Sudan announced the formation of the Constitution Amendment Commission in March 1951. Both Diu was the sole southerner of the commission, which had 16 northerners and three British officials including the chairman. When the commission started work on 26 March 1951, Both Diu called for a federal constitution. His proposals were persistently rejected by the northern members of the commission, and he resigned in disgust. The commission continued without southern representation. However, the British members of the commission did insist on some safeguards in the draft constitution to protect southern interests, including a special Minister for the southern provinces and an advisory board for southern affairs. The northerners managed to later remove this provision.

== Party leader ==
The Southern Sudanese Political Movement was founded in 1951 by Stanislaus Paysama, Abdel Rahman Sule and Both Diu. As the Secretary General of the party, Both Diu protested to the United Nations against the agreement that had been reached by the Constitution Amendment Commission. In 1952 the party changed its name to the Southern Party. As of 1953 the party leaders were Benjamin Lwoki, chairman, Stanslaus Paysama, Vice Chairman, Both Diu, Secretary General and Abdel Rahman Sule, Patron of the party. The objectives were to work for complete independence of Sudan, with special treatment for the south. The party was officially registered in 1953. At first it had widespread support from the southern intelligentsia and from the bulk of the people in the south of Sudan. In 1954 the party was renamed the Liberal Party to avoid any suspicion that it was working for independence of the south, but no northerners joined.

Both Diu toured the south in August 1954 at the expense of Sayyid 'Abd al-Rahman, patron of the Ummah Party, and in his speeches quoted the National Unionist Party (NUP) campaign promises. (The NUP had won the previous elections). Prime minister Ismael Azhari described this as seditious talk and threatened to use force to prevent secession. Ismael Azhari eliminated Buth Diu and Bullen Alier from his cabinet for their criticism of the policy of his government on Southern Sudan. The Sudanese parliament was dissolved in November 1958 after a military coup by General Ibrahim Abboud.

== Later years ==
In November 1964, General Ibrahim Abboud returned control to an interim civilian government. In 1965 a northern-dominated government was elected led by Muhammad Ahmad Mahgoub. This government paid lip service to a peaceful solution to the southern problem, while waging an increasingly brutal war against the Anyanya rebels. The Southern Front withdrew its candidates for the Supreme Council and the Cabinet, saying that the government had violated its agreement that the Southern Front would be the sole representative of the south. The Sudan African National Union (SANU) had two members appointed to the cabinet, Alfred Wol Akoc and Andrew Wieu, and Both Diu was appointed to the third seat reserved for a southerner in the cabinet. He was given the position of Minister of Animal Resources. The two SANU ministers resigned in protest after the Juba and Wau massacres. Both Diu and Philimon Majok were now the only representatives of Southern Sudan in the government, both supporters of a unified Sudan. Buth Diu was elected unopposed from the Zeraf constituency in the March 1967 parliamentary by-election.

Both Diu died soon after the 1972 Peace Accord was signed in Addis Ababa, ending the First Sudanese Civil War. He had tried to bridge the huge gap between the south and the realities of northern politics, and often failed to satisfy either camp. Both Diu once said that Sudan was like an eagle with a broken wing, dragging itself along the ground, becoming weaker each day, longing to return to the freedom of the skies.
