= Foreign aid to Sudan =

There has historically been a significant amount of foreign aid to Sudan, including a large amount of relief aid from international organizations to alleviate the effects of civil wars within the south of Sudan and in Darfur. Amounts have varied according to the intensity of the conflicts and rainfall patterns, and the political views of the countries sending aid. Most aid to Sudan from other nations is channeled through the United Nations, which most recently sought to raise US$1.6 billion for Sudan's recent Sudanese refugee crisis programs in 2026.

Based on data from the international economic organization, the Organisation for Economic Co-operation and Development, the U.S. has provided one-third of aid to Sudan between 2000 and 2009, making it the largest donor for most of these years. The European Union institutions provided 13.4% of aid during the same period. During these years, Arab country governments, including Kuwait, Saudi Arabia, and United Arab Emirates, made two large contributions: U.S.$146.4 million in 2000 and U.S.$81.8 million in 2008. Overall, these countries account for 2.3% of the total aid during the same nine-year period.

Top 10 donors of official development assistance (2008–2009 average) to Sudan
Rank	Country	Total Assistance
1	United States	$901M
2	EU Institutions	$252M
3	United Kingdom	$246M
4	Netherlands	$127M
5	Japan	$124M
6	Norway	$106M
7	Canada	$94M
8	Arab countries	$78M
9	Sweden	$60M
10	Germany	$47M

== United Nations ==
The United Nations has had a presence in Sudan since the 1950s and provided humanitarian assistance during the country's two civil wars. After the signing of the CPA in 2005, the UN coordinated planning and integration with government counterparts. Following the CPA, the UN established the following:

- The United Nations Mission in Sudan (UNMIS): consists of up to 10,000 military personnel, 715 police, and a large civilian component focused on the implementation of the CPA
- Joint Assessment Mission for Sudan: designed to assess the country's reconstruction and development needs
- United Nations Development Assistance Framework (UNDAF) for 2009–2012: the strategic framework developed with the Government of National Unity and the Government of Southern Sudan for the activities and collaborative efforts of the UN system at the country level
- African Union/United Nations Hybrid operation in Darfur (UNAMID): placed 10,000 troops with the aim of bringing peace and stability to the Darfur region

=== United Nations Development Assistance Framework ===
The United Nations Development Assistance Framework (UNDAF) is the common framework for all UN agencies working in Sudan. The overarching goal is consolidating peace and stability. The UN has identified four critical areas for 2009–2012:

- Peace-building
- Governance and rule of law
- Livelihoods and productive sectors
- Basic services

Under the peace-building area, the UN has a goal that "by 2012, the environment for sustainable peace in Sudan is improved through increased respect for rights and human security, with special attention to individuals and communities directly affected by conflict". Under this goal, the UN has identified three sub-outcomes: enhanced capacity of Sudanese society and government to use conflict mitigation; reduced threats from mines, explosive remnants of war, and small arms for those in conflict affected areas; and sustainable solutions for war-affected groups are supported by authorities at all levels and with active participation of communities.

== Foreign aid workers expelled ==
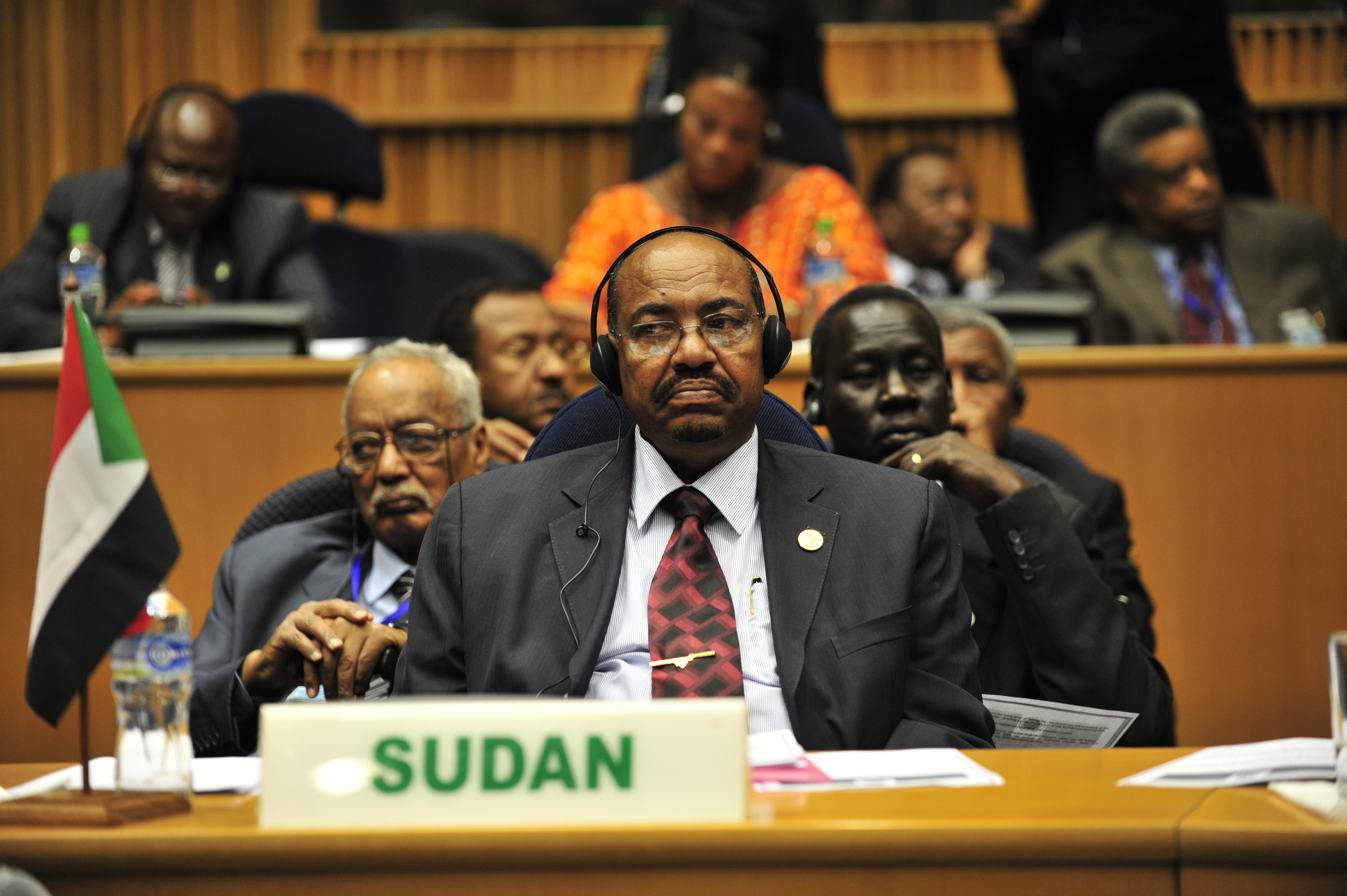
Omar Hassan Ahmad al-Bashir, the president of Sudan, listens to a speech during the opening of the 20th session of The New Partnership for Africa's Development in Addis Ababa, Ethiopia, Jan. 31, 2009.

In March 2009 Sudan President Omar al-Bashir ordered that all aid groups cease operations in Sudan within one year. Sudan had previously expelled 13 aid agencies, including Oxfam, Save the Children, and two branches of Médecins Sans Frontières. Some groups were required to leave the country within 24 hours and no guarantees of staff safety could be made. The International Criminal Court had issued a warrant for President Bashir's arrest and he accused the aid workers of spying on the Court's behalf. His statement was later clarified to say that the order did not apply to UN agencies.

== UK-hosted conference on foreign aid to Sudan ==
In April 2025, the United Kingdom hosted a conference to mark the two-year anniversary of the conflict in Sudan, which broke out in 2023. As part of this conference, the UK announced £120 million of funding for Sudan, and called on other multilateral donors in attendance to give what they can.

== See also ==
- United States aid to Sudan
- United States policy on conflict mitigation and reconciliation in Sudan
