= Philip Abbas Ghaboush =

Rev. Philip Abbas Ghaboush was a Nuba Sudanese reverend and politician. He was born in Omdurman, Sudan in 1922 and died in London in 2008 at the age of 86. He descended from the Ama people of Nuba Mountain of Southern Kordufan. He studied religion at Bishop Gwynne College of Theology and Trinity College. He ran as a candidate for the General Union of Nubas party in 1965 and was exiled from Sudan in 1969 after the military coup in which Jaafar Nimeiry seized power and stayed in exile until 1978. In the 1986 elections for the National Assembly of Sudan, his Sudan National Party won 10 seats.
