= Nahnu Jund Allah Jund Al-watan =

National anthem of Sudan

Naḥnu Jund Allāh Jund al-Waṭan
English: "We are Soldiers of God, Soldiers of the Homeland"
- نحن جند الله جند الوطن
- National anthem of Sudan
- Lyrics: Ahmad Muhammad Salih, 1955
- Music: Ahmed Morjan, 1955
- Adopted: 1 January 1956; 70 years ago

Audio sample
- U.S. Navy Band instrumental version: file; help

"Naḥnu Jund Allāh Jund al-Waṭan" (Arabic: نحن جند الله جند الوطن; English: "We are Soldiers of God, Soldiers of the Homeland") is the national anthem of Sudan. The words were written by the poet Ahmed Mohammed Saleh and the tune was composed by Ahmed Morjan in 1955. It is officially called the Republican Salute (especially when played musically), as it is called for short, the Flag Anthem or Flag Salute.

== History ==
The current national anthem of Sudan was originally the organizational anthem of the Sudan Defence Force prior to independence. The poem "We are the Soldiers of God, the Soldiers of Homeland" was chosen among other poems that participated in a general competition about poetic works praising the strength of the Sudan Defence Force in 1955. When Sudan gained independence in 1956, the first four verses of the poem were chosen to be the national anthem.

== Lyrics ==
Arabic original

نحن جند الله جند الوطن
إن دعا داعي الفداء لم نخن
نتحدى الموت عند المحن
نشتري المجد بأغلى ثمن
هذه الأرض لنا
فليعش سوداننا علماً بين الأمم
يا بني السودان هذا رمزكم
يحمل العبء ويحمي أرضكم

Romanisation

Naḥnu jundu Allāh jundu l-waṭan
ʾIn daʿā dāʿī al-fidāʾ lam nakhun
Nataḥaddā l-mawt ʿinda l-miḥan,
nashtarī l-majda bi-ʾaghlā thaman
Hādhihī l-ʾarḍu lanā fal-yaʿish Sūdānunā,
ʿalaman bayna l-ʾumam
Yā banī s-Sūdān, hādhā ramzukum
yaḥmilu l-ʿibʾa wa yaḥmī ʾarḍakum.

IPA transcription (Note: See Help:IPA/Arabic and Sudanese Arabic.)

[næħ.nʊ ɡʲʊn.dʊ‿ɫ.ɫɑːh ɡʲʊn.dʊ‿l.wɑ.tˤɑn]
[ʔɪn dæ.ʕɑː dæ.ʕiː æl.fi.dæːʔ læm næ.xʊn]
[næ.tæ.ħæd.dæ‿l.mɑwt ʕɪn.dæ‿l.mɪ.ħæn]
[næʃ.tæ.rɪ‿l.mæɡʲ.dæ bɪ.ʔæɣ.læː θæ.mæn]
[hæː.ði.hɪ‿l.ʔɑr.dˤu læ.næː fæl.jæ.ʕɪʃ suː.dæː.nu.næː]
[ʕɑ.læ.mæn bæj.næ‿l.ʔu.mæm]
[jæː bæ.nɪ‿s.suː.dæːn hæː.ðæː rɑm.zʊ.kʊm]
[jæħ.mɪ.lʊ‿l.ʕɪb.ʔæ wæ jæħ.miː ʔɑr.dɑ.kʊm]

English translation

We are soldiers of God, soldiers of the homeland
If called for redemption we will not betray
We defy death upon ordeals
We buy glory at the most expensive price
This land is ours, long live our Sudan
An edifice among the nations
O Sons of the Sudan this is your symbol,
Carries the burden and protecting your land

As for the rest of the verses, they are not officially approved in the national anthem:

Arabic original

نَحْنُ أُسُودُ الْغَابِ أَبْنَاءُ الْحُرُوبْ
لَا نَهَابُ الْمَوْتَ أَوْ نَخْشَى الْخُطُوبْ
نَحْفَظُ السُّودَانَ فِيْ هَٰذِهِ الْقُلُوبْ
نَفْتَدِيهِ مِنْ شَمَالٍ أَوْ جَنُوبْ
بِالْكِفَاحِ الْمُرِّ وَالْعَزْمِ الْمَتِينْ
وَقُلُوبٍ مِنْ حَدِيدٍ لَا تَلِينْ
نَهْزِمُ الشَّرَّ وَنَجْلِي الْغَاصِبِينْ
كَنُسُورِ الْجَوِّ أَوْ أَسَدِ الْعَرِينْ
نَدْفَعُ الرَّدَىٰ
نَصُدُّ مَنْ عَدَىٰ
نردُّ من ظلم
ونحمي العلم

English translation

We are the lions of the jungle, the sons of wars
We do not fear death or fear engagements
We keep Sudan in these hearts
We redeem it from North or South
With bitter struggle and solid determination
And hearts of unrelenting iron
We defeat evil and deliver the usurpers
As the air eagles or the lion of the den
We fend off death
We repel those who attack
We respond whomever unjust
And protect the flag
