= United States aid to Sudan =

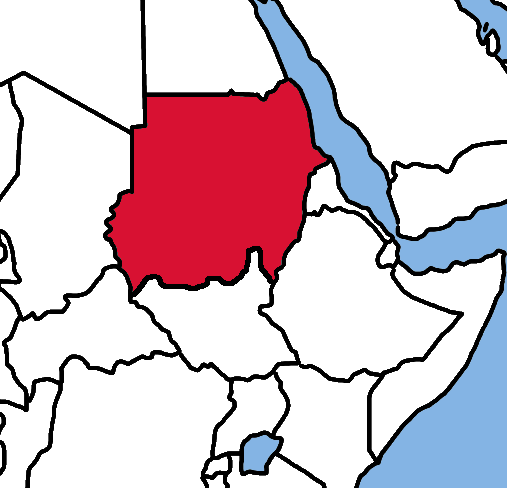
Location of Sudan in Africa

United States aid to Sudan has three key objectives: a definitive end to conflict, gross human rights abuses, and genocide in Darfur; implementation of the north–south Comprehensive Peace Agreement that results in a peaceful post-2011 Sudan, or an orderly path toward two separate and viable states at peace with each other; and ensuring that Sudan does not provide a safe haven for international terrorists. Sudan has experienced two civil wars since 1955, the second of which lasted 22 years. During this time, the U.S. was the largest provider of foreign aid to Sudan, largely focused on humanitarian aid through the U.S. Agency for International Development. Sudan is listed as the U.S. government's highest priority in Africa due to "its importance for counter-terrorism and regional stability, as well as the magnitude of human rights and humanitarian abuses" U.S. foreign aid to Sudan has begun to see some positive indicators of performance although critical reaction has said that aid to Sudan is neither strategic nor focused.

== U.S. foreign aid overview ==
=== History ===
In 1961 Congress passed the Foreign Assistance Act, which separated the U.S.'s non-military and military foreign assistance programs. As part of the Act, the United States Agency for International Development (USAID) was created. This act was passed in the wake of the Marshall Plan, in which the U.S. provided aid to European countries devastated as a result of World War II. President John F. Kennedy supported the creation of USAID based on three tenets:

1. Current foreign aid programs were ill-equipped to meet the needs of the U.S. and developing countries.
2. Allowing developing countries' economies to collapse would be "disastrous to our national security, harmful to our comparative prosperity, and offensive to our conscience."
3. The 1960s was considered to be a good time for developed countries to assist developing countries.

=== Current allocation to Sudan ===
According to the U.S. embassy in Chad, there are three key U.S. strategic objectives in Sudan:

1. A definitive end to conflict, gross human rights abuses, and genocide in Darfur
2. Implementation of the north-south CPA that results in a peaceful post-2011 Sudan, or an orderly path toward two separate and viable states at peace with each other
3. Ensure that Sudan does not provide a safe haven for international terrorists

The bulk of U.S. foreign aid to Sudan should, as a result, pertain to one or more of these objectives. The U.S. also wants to encourage local governments to be more active in assisting its people in reaching these objectives.

As of 2010 the current allocation of U.S. foreign aid from USAID to Sudan is $420,349,319. The U.S. had been involved with foreign aid to Sudan for many years. They gave close to $270 million between 1977–1981 and were Sudan's largest source of foreign aid by 1984. In the mid-1980s the U.S. provided Sudan with food aid, insecticides, and fertilizers. When Sudan failed to repay loans in 1985, the U.S. ceased all non-food aid. USAID continued to provide humanitarian assistance through 1991. Since 2005 the U.S. government has contributed upwards of $8 billion in humanitarian aid as food aid, health care provisions, water, sanitation, and hygiene. They have also given money towards nutrition, agriculture, protection, and economic recovery programs. A large portion of this funding is through USAID, which funds solely through bilateral programs rather than pooling efforts within multilateral organizations.

==== Programs ====
Visual identity of USAID. The logo is on the left and the brand mark on the right.

USAID focuses on seven main areas of development in Sudan.

===== Humanitarian assistance =====
USAID funds activities which support the CPA, long-term recovery, and a transition to a more peaceful and secure nation. USAID has been active in Darfur since 2004. $127.6 million for water sanitation, hygiene, health, shelter, and infrastructure was provided to Sudanese refugees in eastern Chad in 2009.

===== Food aid =====
USAID has been Sudan's largest food aid donor since 2004. USAID provides an annual $30 million for a multi-year food aid development program as well as almost $680 million in emergency food aid. Darfur, displaced peoples and returnees, basic services, and food security are USAID's priorities.

===== Peace and security =====
A goal of USAID in Sudan is to build local Sudanese capacity to address the causes and effects of political conflict, violence, and instability. USAID wants to strengthen consensus-building through political processes. Civil and community organizations in Darfur are also supported.

===== Governing justly and democratically =====
USAID supports the CPA's core political processes. It strengthens the systems to meet the needs of citizens and government, as well as developing governmental priorities at multiple levels. In southern Sudan and three other areas, USAID assists with governmental transparency and increasing incomes. It also support elections, consultations, and referendums. A major goal is to promote participation in the civic process, consensus building, and international observation.

===== Investing in people =====
USAID focuses on health by supporting mother and child health services and reducing the impact of HIV/AIDS, malaria, tuberculosis, and other infectious diseases. It supports training medical officers to increase access to health care and immunizations. To support education, it trains teachers, improves schools, and encourages parent participation in education. USAID also promotes education for girls.

===== Economic growth =====
By improving infrastructure and connections from isolated communities such as Loun-Ariik, USAID creates a more favorable environment for market development. Improved land management for areas rich in biodiversity is also a focus.

== U.S. policy on conflict mitigation and reconciliation ==
=== History of funding for the program ===
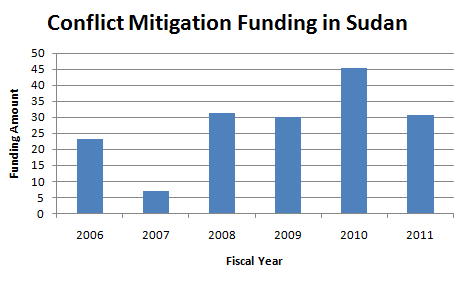
Funding from 2006 to 2011

In 2005 USAID reported on its Sudanese funding strategy. Sudan is the U.S. government's highest priority in Africa due to "its importance for counter-terrorism and regional stability, as well as the magnitude of human rights and humanitarian abuses". This explains the high level of U.S. funding, particularly within the peace and security sector, during the years immediately after the 2005 signing of the CPA in Sudan. The U.S. government's priority was to assist in the implementation of the agreement, as Sudan's ability to achieve stability rested primarily on the CPA.

Since 2023, 144.71 million of U.S. funding allocated towards conflict mitigation and reconciliation in Sudan, $141.77 million has gone towards the Economic Support Fund. USAID states the following as key objectives for the Economic Support Fund:

- Supporting strategically significant friends and allies through assistance designed to increase the role of the private sector in the economy, reduce government controls over markets, enhance job creation, and improve economic growth
- Developing and strengthening institutions necessary for sustainable democracy. Typical areas of assistance include technical assistance to administer and monitor elections, capacity building for non-governmental organizations, judicial training, and women's participation in politics. Assistance is also provided to support the transformation of the public sector to encourage democratic development, including training to improve public administration, promote decentralization, and strengthen local governments, parliaments, independent media and non-governmental organizations.
- Strengthening the capacity to manage the human dimension of the transition to democracy and a market economy and to help sustain the neediest sectors of the population during the transition period

One use for these funds is to "assist countries and regions at risk of civil unrest by helping these countries fight poverty, build democratic institutions to guarantee human rights, and provide basic services and economic opportunities to their populations." As Sudan falls under this description for "at-risk states", the Economic Support Fund will specifically help Sudan implement the CPA and support peace processes in Darfur.

Overall U.S. funding for foreign aid to Sudan has decreased from $924.1 million in 2009 to $427.8 million in 2010, with the department requesting $440.0 million in 2011. Of this funding, the amount allocated towards conflict mitigation and reconciliation in Sudan has fluctuated dramatically in recent years.

U.S. funding for conflict mitigation and reconciliation within Sudan falls under the umbrella of peace and security funding, which is primarily administered by USAID and the United States Department of State. USAID defines its work for peace and security in Sudan in the following way:

"USAID works to strengthen Sudanese capacity to address the causes and consequences of political conflict, violence, and instability. This includes building the capacity of local authorities to deliver peace dividends and enforce the rule of law. USAID also assists existing mechanisms that support consensus-building through key political processes to mitigate potentially catalytic conflicts. In Darfur, USAID supports civil society and community organizations in early recovery and peace-building activities".

=== Results ===
The U.S. Department of State has a list of performance indicators used to determine the value of funding towards peace and security objectives. The information used to assess performance is attained by Department of State agencies, its partners, and multilateral global bodies such as the United Nations and the World Bank.

Because of the integrated approach to Sudanese funding from the U.S. and the global community as a whole, it is challenging to attribute specific results to U.S. funding for conflict mitigation and reconciliation in Sudan.

As program evaluations have become a higher priority for the U.S. government, quantifiable program results are beginning to appear. In 2008 USAID funding towards Peace and Security in Sudan resulted in the following:

- strengthening 38 formal and informal peace-building and community-strengthening networks in Darfur, including neighborhood youth associations
- engagement of 102,407 people in community-based reconciliation projects throughout northern Sudan
- construction of six early warning posts in volatile areas of the Greater Upper Nile

=== Reactions ===
The impact of U.S. aid to Sudan has been a controversial topic. A June 2010 USAID report stated "capacity building efforts in Southern Sudan are currently neither strategic nor focused. With few exceptions, the objectives are sweeping, unspecific, detached from actual performance, impossible to measure, and thus unlikely to succeed". One claim is that the capacity of the governmental bodies within Sudan are not enough to effectively use such funding. Aid money is either not provided where expected or used ineffectively and is therefore mostly wasted.

Flag of the Sudanese People's Liberation Army

Although not specifically linked to U.S. funding for conflict mitigation and reconciliation, one criticism of U.S. foreign aid towards Sudan has been in the use of such funding to provide assistance towards the Sudanese People's Liberation Army (SPLA), which enlists child soldiers. As of December 2009, the SPLA included around 1,200 children—both boys and girls—aged between 12 and 17 years old.

== See also ==
- Sudan – United States relations
