= Stanislaus Paysama =

Southern Sudanese politician (died 1985)

Stanislaus Paysama (died 1985) was one of the founders of the Liberal Party in Anglo-Egyptian Sudan a few years before Sudan gained independence in 1956.

== Early years ==
According to his autobiography How a Slave Became a Minister, Stanislaus was born into the Fur people in South Darfur and was captured by Baggara slavers around 1904. He was taken to Kafia Kingi, where he was abducted by a professional Fur slave dealer. Later he was freed and taken to Wau in what today is Western Bahr el Ghazal state, where he was educated, converted to Christianity and gained employment as a clerk in the British administration. Between 1933 and 1943 he worked in Rumbek and Yirol.

== Early political career ==
Stanislaus was the first president of the Southern Sudan Welfare Committee, founded in November 1946 in Juba. Within a few months the committee had created branches in Malakal, Wau and other Southern towns. The original aim was to form a "social society" of clerks and bookkeepers, but the committee soon took on a political role, and became active in promoting the Southern cause. In 1951 he was a co-founder of the Southern Sudanese Political Movement, with Abdul Rahman Sule and Buth Diu. The party was later renamed the Southern Party and then the Liberal Party. As of 1953 the party leaders were Benjamin Lwoki, Chairman, Stanslaus Paysama, Vice Chairman, Buth Diu, Secretary General and Abdel Rahman Sule, Patron of the party. The objectives were to work for complete independence of Sudan, with special treatment for the south. The party was officially registered in 1953. At first it had widespread support from the southern intelligentsia and from the bulk of the people in the south of Sudan.

The party did well in the 1953 elections for the pre-independence transitional government. The major religious sectarian parties, the Umma and the National Unionist Party (NUP), both needed the support of the southerners to form a government, but the southerners failed to remain united. Many members crossed the floor to other parties, reducing the size of the Liberal party to 20-25 members. The party chairman, Stanislaus Paysama, said that the Liberals almost held the trump card, but "The money was there, a great amount of money, from the Government and the Umma Party, and every time elections [votes] came, they [the southern politicians] are destroyed like this".

Stanislaus was one of the three ministers from the south of Sudan to be appointed to the government after independence in 1956. A few months later he was dismissed and accused of subversion, meaning that he had called for a federal structure with a degree of autonomy for the south.

== Later years ==
The Sudanese parliament was dissolved in November 1958 after a military coup by General Ibrahim Abboud. Stanislaus's Southern Front worked underground during the military regime. After violent riots in 1964, Abbud dissolved the Supreme Council of the Armed Forces and appointed a transitional government in November 1964, with elections scheduled for April 1965. The Southern Front under Payasama contested the elections in the south with the Sudan African National Union (SANU) led by William Deng. Stanislaus Paysama advised Deng not to form a new party but to join with the Southern Front in reviving the Liberal Party, which still had widespread grassroots support. However, Deng refused and his SANU candidates ran independently in the elections.
