= Liberal Party (Sudan) =

- President: Abdel Rahman Sule; Benjamin Lwoki
- Chairperson: Stanislaus Paysama
- General Secretary: Buth Diu
- Founded: 1952
- Dissolved: November 1958
- Ideology: Liberalism; Southern autonomy
- Political position: Center-left

The Liberal Party, at first called the Southern Party and later the Southern Liberal Party, was formed in Anglo-Egyptian Sudan before Sudan became independent in January 1956. Until the military coup of November 1958 the Liberals were one of the main parties representing the southern Sudanese constituencies in parliament.

== Foundation ==
The Southern Sudanese Political Movement was founded in 1951 by Stanislaus Paysama, Abdel Rahman Sule and Buth Diu. In 1952 it changed its name to the Southern Party. As of 1953 the party leaders were Benjamin Lwoki, Chairman, Stanslaus Paysama, Vice Chairman, Buth Diu, Secretary General and Abdel Rahman Sule, Patron of the party. The objectives were to work towards the complete independence of Sudan, with autonomy given to the south. The party was officially registered in 1953. At first it had widespread support from the southern intellectuals and from the bulk of the people in the south of Sudan.

In the November 1953 national elections, most candidates in the south ran on the Southern Party platform, some were independent and five ran on the National Unionist Party (NUP) platform. Nine candidates were elected for the Southern Party, supported by three independent candidates. Most of the newly elected southern MPs traveled on the same boat to Khartoum, and agreed to come together under one banner. This was only a loose alliance, with constant disputes about leadership and policy.

== First democratic period ==
After the 1953 elections the main political struggle was over appointments to the administration of the independent Sudan. The Southern Party was critical of the way the Sudanization program for appointing senior public servants was managed, and was deeply disappointed when only six southerners were selected with the remainder of the 800 posts going to northerners. The Sudanization commission, staffed entirely by northerners, said they could not find southerners with sufficient education and experience. An unstated factor was that they were not fluent in Arabic.

The party adopted the name of "Liberal Party" in 1954. The new name was meant to remove fears that the party stood for southern secession. However, the northerners continued to call it the "Southern Liberal Party". Later the party adopted the name of "Southern Liberal Party". The party convened a meeting in Juba in October 1954 where the injustices of the Public Service Commission were discussed at length. The attendees resolved unanimously that the best solution for the south was federation, and called on southerners to prepare to make sacrifices in meeting this goal. Benjamin Lwoki was president of the party in this period. Faced with insistence that the language of Sudan would be Arabic, taught throughout the country, in a 1954 telegram to Harold Macmillan he refused to support a declaration of independence.

The major religious sectarian parties, the Umma and the NUP, both needed the support of the southerners to form a government, but the southerners failed to remain united. Many members crossed the floor to other parties, reducing the size of the Liberal party to 20–25 members. The party chairman, Stanislaus Paysama, said that the Liberals almost held the trump card, but "The money was there, a great amount of money, from the Government and the Umma Party, and every time elections came, they [the southern politicians] are destroyed like this". In April 1955 the Liberal Party called for all southern MPs to work together for southern aspirations as one bloc, and to support whatever northern party would help them in their goals. The party called for a conference to be held in Juba in June of that year. In response, the government took steps to weaken the party by saying that no civil servant could engage in politics, and by giving wide publicity to southern chiefs who opposed the conference.

In August 1955 the garrison at Torit in the south rebelled, the first move in the First Sudanese Civil War (1955–1972). The troops, who were southerners, were concerned that the government planned to replace them by northerners. In the ensuing disturbances 261 northerners were killed in different locations across the south, and 75 southerners. The Liberal Party was among those calling for British military intervention, which some expected to favor the rebels. However, the British supported demands that the rebels surrender, and by mid-September 1955 a fragile peace had been restored.

Sudan became independent on 1 January 1956. Some of the more educated southerners felt that the Liberal party had been bought out by the northerners. In 1957 two intellectuals, Father Saturnino Lohure Hilangi and Ezboni Mondiri Gwanza, founded the Southern Sudan Federal Party (SSFP), which beat the Liberals and won forty seats in the parliamentary elections held in February and March 1958. When the SSFP spoke up in parliament for the north to consider a Sudanese federation, as promised, the government arrested Mondiri and the SSFP broke up. In its place, Father Saturnino formed the Southern Block, with 25 members. After the 1958 elections cynical northerners exploited personal and ethnic hostilities to split the party into rival factions and to win the support of Liberal MPs. The Sudanese parliament was dissolved in November 1958 after a military coup by General Ibrahim Abboud.

== Second democratic period ==
In November 1964, General Ibrahim Abboud returned control to an interim civilian government. When William Deng, a leader of the exiled Sudan African National Union (SANU) decided to run in the April 1965 elections that followed the handover, Stanislaus Paysama advised him not to form a new party but to revive the Liberal Party, which still had widespread grassroots support. However, Deng and the rival Southern Front refused to unite and ran for election independently. A Round Table conference was held in March 1965 to try to resolve the southern problem. After the conference, although the old Liberal Party and the Sudan Unity Party remained in existence in Khartoum, the Southern Front and the William Deng's SANU-Inside faction had become the dominant parties in southern Sudan. The Liberal Party contested the elections under Father Philip Abbas Ghabboush. They won just one seat.
