= Chief Justice of Sudan =

Head of the Judiciary of Sudan

The chief justice of Sudan is the head of the Judiciary of Sudan. Under Article 29.(3) of the August 2019 Draft Constitutional Declaration, the chief justice is also the president of the Supreme Court of Sudan and is "responsible for administering the judicial authority before the Supreme Judicial Council."

== List of chief justices ==
=== Chief Justices ===
- 1903–1917 Wasey Sterry (until 1915 Chief Judge)
- 1917–1925 Robert Hay Dun
- 1925–1930 Sir Bernard Humphrey Bell
- 1930–1936 Howell Owen
- 1936–1942 Thomas Percival Creed
- 1942–1944 Sir Hubert Flaxman
- 1944–1946 Cecil Harry Andrew Bennett
- 1946–1948 Sir Charles Cecil George Cumings
- 1947–1950 Thomas Arthur Maclagan
- 1950–1955 William O'Brien Lindsay
- 1956–1964 Muhammad Ahmad Abu Rannat
- 1965–1967 Babiker Awadalla

#	Image	Name (birth–death)	Took office	Left office
		Abdel-Mageed Imam		(pre-1986)
RCCNS/Omar al-Bashir presidency
99		Haider Ahmed Dafalla	2014	2019
Sovereignty Council of Sudan
100		Nemat Abdullah Khair	10 October 2019	18 May 2021
101		Abdel-Aziz Fathal-Rahman Abdeen Mohamed	26 November 2021	

== See also ==
- History of Sudan
