= Nemat Abdullah Khair =

Sudanese Chief Justice since 2019

Nemat Abdullah Mohamed Khair
- نعمات عبدالله محمد خير

Chief Justice of Sudan
- In office 10 October 2019 – 18 May 2021
- Prime Minister: Abdalla Hamdok

Personal details
- Born: 1957 (age 68–69) Al-Kamleen, Gezira, Sudan
- Education: Cairo University
- Occupation: Judge
- Known for: First female Chief Justice of Sudan

Nemat Abdullah Mohamed Khair (Arabic: نعمات عبدالله محمد خير; other transliterations: Neemat, Nimat, Abdallah; born 1957) is a Sudanese judge of the Sudanese Supreme Court who became Chief Justice of Sudan (head of the Sudanese judiciary) on 10 October 2019 until 15 May 2021. As such, under Article 29.(3) of the August 2019 Draft Constitutional Declaration, she is also the president of the Supreme Court of Sudan and is "responsible for administering the judicial authority before the Supreme Judicial Council." Khair is the first woman Chief Justice of Sudan.

== Childhood and education ==
Khair is from al-Kamleen in Gezira, and obtained a BA in law from Cairo University.

== Judicial career ==
=== Early career ===
Khair became a member of the Sudanese judiciary in the early 1980s. She worked in the Court of Appeal, the Court of First Instance, and became a judge of the Supreme Court. Khair founded the Sudanese Judges Club as an organisation independent from government.

Khair ruled against the al-Bashir government in 2016 in a case involving the Anglican church.

=== Role in the Sudanese revolution ===
Khair participated in protests during the Sudanese revolution, including a march by judges and in the sit-in in front of the Khartoum army headquarters, which was broken up in the 3 June Khartoum massacre.

=== Chief Justice of Sudan ===
On 10 October 2019, Khair was confirmed as the head of the Sudanese judiciary after being selected by consensus between the Transitional Military Council (TMC) and the Forces of Freedom and Change alliance (FFC). Under Article 29.(3) of the August 2019 Draft Constitutional Declaration, she is also the president of the Supreme Court and is "responsible for administering the judicial authority before the Supreme Judicial Council." Khair had earlier been expected to become Chief Justice on 20 or 21 August 2019, according to Khartoum Star and Sudan Daily.

Khair is the first female Chief Justice of Sudan, and one of only a small number of female Chief Justices in Africa (following Kaïta Kayentao Diallo – Mali, 2006; Umu Hawa Tejan-Jalloh – Sierra Leone, 2008; Mathilda Twomey – Seychelles, 2011; Nthomeng Majara – Lesotho, 2014; Irene Mambilima – Zambia, 2015; Sophia Akuffo – Ghana, 2017; Meaza Ashenafi – Ethiopia, 2018).

On 12 September 2019, prior to Khair's 10 October confirmation, thousands of protestors in Khartoum and other Sudanese towns called for Abdelgadir Mohamed Ahmed to be appointed as Chief Justice and Mohamed el-Hafiz as Attorney General. Another 10 October decree declared Tag el-Sir el-Hibir as Attorney-General.

On 18 May 2021, she was relived from her duties as Chief Justice.

== Analysis ==
According to Sudan Daily, Khair is "known for her competence, integrity and experience". Muez Hadra of the Forces for Freedom and Change (FFC) described her as "honest and earnest" and completely independent of the former al-Bashir government.

Khair is not affiliated to any political party. She had been perceived as an opponent of the al-Bashir government for several years prior to the Sudanese revolution.

== See also ==
- 2019 Sudanese transition to democracy
- Chief justice
