= Supreme Court of Sudan =

The Supreme Court, located in Khartoum, is the highest judicial authority in Sudan, apart from the Constitutional Court, which under Article 30 of the August 2019 Draft Constitutional Declaration, is to be "an independent court, separate from the judicial authority." Nemat Abdullah Khair was appointed as Chief Justice of Sudan, thus becoming the President of the Supreme Court, on 10 October 2019.

== History ==
As of 2011, the court consists of 70 judges operating through panels each composed of three judges, with a senior president. The members of the Supreme Court are appointed by the President of Sudan who is advised on the matter by the supreme council of the judiciary, members of the courts of appeal and other people with the required qualifications. Decisions made in the court are reached by the majority and are only subject to revision "when the chief justice deems that an infringement of sharia laws had taken place." If this is the case "he convenes a five Supreme Court judges panel the majority of whom not must have participated in reaching the disputed decision in order to resolve the matter. "

In October 2010, seven Indonesian judges joined a three-week training course in Sudan to learn about economic sharia (syariah) (Islamic laws), given that Sudan is reportedly known as a pioneer in the syariah field. The Indonesian Supreme Court and the Sudanese Supreme Court will sign a Memorandum of Understanding (MOU) in September 2011.

With the new independence of South Sudan, supreme authority in South Sudan has since passed to the South Sudan Supreme Court in Juba, a court which had been planned since at least 2005.
