= Juba Conference (1947) =

The Juba Conference was a June 1947 meeting attended by British and Sudanese delegates in the city of Juba, then the regional capital of Equatoria Province in South Sudan (and today the national capital of South Sudan).

Britain organised the conference to combine northern and southern Sudan into one political entity. Until then, the two sectors were essentially treated by the British as two separate colonies because of ethnic, religious and cultural differences. Northern Sudan was heavily Arabized and had a fairly well-structured political and economic infrastructure. Northerners practiced Islam and were relatively well-educated. Southern Sudan was mainly composed of various Nilotic tribes who practiced a mixture of Christian and traditional beliefs. Economically, it did not possess the organization of northern Sudan.

The Juba Conference agreed that northern and southern Sudan would constitute one state and that a Legislative Assembly would represent the entire colony. However, southern Sudanese representatives had several reservations about the resolutions, largely because they were in an inferior position in regards to their region's lack of educational and political experience.

Their apprehension was realised when 800 administrative posts were vacated by the British in preparation for Sudanese "self-rule"; only four of the government posts went to Southerners. In discussions to determine the future of the modern state of Sudan, the southern provinces were largely excluded from the political process.

This disparity led to the First and Second Sudanese Civil Wars, eventually resulting, in 2011, in the Southern provinces becoming an independent state, the Republic of South Sudan.

== External reference ==
- Minutes Taken at the Juba Conference of 1947
