= Republican Brotherhood =

1945–1989 political party in Sudan

Republican Brotherhood اخوان الجمهوريين
- Leader: Mahmoud Mohamed Taha
- Founded: 1945
- Dissolved: 1989
- Headquarters: Khartoum, Sudan
- Ideology: Secularism; Republicanism; Sudanese nationalism

Republican Brotherhood (Arabic: إخوان الجمهوريين) was a small, but influential political party in Sudan. The party was founded in the 1945, by Mahmoud Mohamed Taha. The party came into the limelight in 1983, as Taha opposed the implementations of sharia laws by Jaafar Nimeiry. Taha was arrested and executed in 1985. The party continued to exist for a few years, being disbanded sometime after 1989.

== History ==
The Republican Brotherhood was the popular name for what Mahmud Muhammad Taha called the New Islamic Mission. Taha sought to develop a new Muslim consciousness based on a modern view of Islam and Islamic law. The New Islamic Mission was founded in 1945. The Brotherhood however refrained from participation in elections, having inherited the Republican Party's historically disdain for the political process. In spite of this the Brotherhood's influence in Sudanese politics grew up until the execution of Taha in 1985, with the party having particularly swelled in the years leading up to 1985, largely due to an influx of students, women, and Muslim intellectuals.

Taha and the Republican Brotherhood disagreed with Nimeiri's government over the role of Islamic law and freedom of speech. Taha spent brief periods in jail during the 1960s and 1970s, whilst the membership of the Republican Brotherhood grew to approximately 1,000 active men and women by 1980. In spite of Brotherhood's traditional aversion to involvement in politics the Brotherhood launched a major speaking and writing campaign in 1983 against Nimeiri's September Laws, which instituted a strict form of Sharia law in Sudan. The Brotherhood's campaign resulted in the arrest of more than 70 members of the organisation, including 4 Republican Sisters and Taha himself. No charges were brought against the group until the Brotherhood issued a final pamphlet at the end of 1984 demanding that Islamic law be dropped as the only state law in force. Taha was charged with apostasy, convicted, sentenced to death, and then executed on 18 January 1985. Along with Taha's execution, the Republican Brotherhood movement was disbanded. Many of its members still live in exile in Great Britain and the United States. The Republican Brothers, who are still under the ban by the Government of Sudan, are practicing either non-publicly or publicly in diaspora, UK or United States where they found safe haven and freedom.

== Ideology ==
The Republican Brotherhood was based on a religious ideology advocating for a revised interpretation of the Qur'an, in line with Qu'ran's Meccan (original revelation) texts, which the Brotherhood argued had precedence over the later, Medinan, portions of the Qur'an. Mahmood Taha's book "The Second Message of Islam" puts forth the radical idea that the Medinan verses concerning legal and social issues that arose after the Hijrah are time-bound to that period. The "Second Message" is to return to the Meccan fundamental principles of justice, equality, and tolerance, which were sent by the Merciful God for all time. In this manner, the Medinan verses regarding the hudud punishments and the physical reprimand of wives, for example, are no longer valid. In other words, the Prophetic sunnah, as long as it demonstrates the Meccan verses of the Qur'an can be a model for society. But the Shari'ah is only an ideal, not a practical guide that Islamic scholars bring out through the process of fiqh. Traditional fiqh based on the sunnah and the application of the Shari'ah necessarily come into question.

The Republican Brotherhood particularly focused on issues relating to the lack of human rights and equality in the treatment of women and non-Muslims in modern Islamic societies. A pragmatic rendering of the program of the Republican Brotherhood would involve the specific revision of the Shari'a law regarding marriage and divorce whereby the right to contract the marriage and the right to terminate it is vested equally with the woman as well as the man, as individuals. Polygamy would be prohibited. The Republican Brotherhood advocated for a revised constitution, based on true principles of Muslim equity and justice, which would protect religious freedom and ensure equality of treatment and standing under the law between non-Muslims and Muslims.
