= 1958 Sudanese coup d'état =

1958 self-coup in Sudan

- Part of the First Sudanese Civil War and the Arab Cold War
Date	17 November 1958
Location	Khartoum, Sudan
Result	Coup successful

Belligerents
Sudan; NUP; PDP	Sudanese Armed Forces

Commanders and leaders
(Sudan) Sovereignty Council; (Sudan) Muhammad Salih Shingitti; (Sudan) Amin al-Sayyid	Abdallah Khalil; Ibrahim Abboud; Ahmad Abd al-Wahab

A bloodless military coup d'état took place in Sudan on 17 November 1958. Orchestrated as a self-coup by the sitting prime minister, Abdallah Khalil, the maneuver preempted a parliamentary vote that would have ousted his government. The coup dissolved the democratic apparatus established after the country's independence, transferring power to the Sudanese Armed Forces under the command of General Ibrahim Abboud and establishing Sudan's first military dictatorship.

== Background ==
Following its independence in 1956, Sudan's first democratic period was immediately characterized by political instability, economic stagnation, and sectarian factionalism. The pre-1969 Sudanese state possessed limited autonomy and was effectively controlled by an "incipient bourgeoisie"—a traditionalist establishment that dominated the main political parties and immobilized institutional reforms.

The civilian government formed after the 1958 Sudanese parliamentary election was a fragile coalition between the National Umma Party (NUP)—supported by the Ansar religious order and led by Prime Minister Abdallah Khalil—and the People's Democratic Party (PDP), backed by the rival Khatmiyya order. By late 1958, this coalition was on the verge of collapse. A poor cotton harvest combined with falling global prices severely damaged the national economy, depleting foreign reserves. Concurrently, tensions with Gamal Abdel Nasser's Egypt escalated over border disputes and the renegotiation of the Nile waters.

Khalil, a retired army general who concurrently served as Minister of Defence, feared that the PDP would defect from the coalition and ally with the National Unionist Party (NUP) led by Ismail al-Azhari. Such an alliance would have formed a pro-Egyptian government, a prospect the Umma Party and the conservative establishment vehemently opposed.

== The coup ==
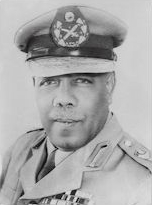
Ibrahim Abboud, the key figure in Sudan's first coup d'état in 1958

To prevent his imminent political defeat and block Egyptian hegemony, Khalil preemptively conspired with the army's high command. The coup occurred on 17 November 1958, the exact day the parliament was scheduled to convene for a session that would likely have passed a vote of no confidence against Khalil's cabinet.

The military takeover was bloodless and executed with the prior knowledge of the United States and the United Kingdom. General Ibrahim Abboud, the army chief of staff, and General Ahmad Abd al-Wahab assumed control of the capital, Khartoum, facing no organized resistance. Rather than maintaining Khalil in a civilian leadership role, the military officers sidelined him; he was not allowed to participate in the new government and was retired on a pension.

== Aftermath ==
General Abboud immediately established the Supreme Council of the Armed Forces. He suspended the transitional constitution, dissolved parliament, and banned all political parties, trade unions, and independent newspapers.

While the military regime initially achieved some economic stabilization and successfully renegotiated the sharing of the Nile waters with Egypt in 1959, its political inflexibility led to severe national crises. The military government sought to enforce national unification through rigid policies of Arabization and Islamization directed at the southern provinces. These repressive measures severely escalated separatist sentiments in the south, leading to the formation of the Anyanya guerrilla movement in 1963 and the consolidation of the First Sudanese Civil War. The ensuing civil conflict and economic deterioration eventually led to the collapse of Abboud's regime during the October 1964 revolution.

== See also ==
- Coups d'état in Sudan
- History of Sudan#Independent Sudan (1956 to present)

== Bibliography ==
=== Academic sources ===
- Crowder, Michael, ed. (1984). The Cambridge History of Africa, Volume 8: From c. 1940 to c. 1975. Cambridge: Cambridge University Press. ISBN 978-0521224093.
- Lobban, Richard A. (1992). Historical Dictionary of the Sudan. Metuchen: Scarecrow Press. ISBN 978-0810825475.
- Niblock, Tim (1987). Class and Power in Sudan: The Dynamics of Sudanese Politics, 1898–1985. London: Palgrave Macmillan. ISBN 978-1-349-08836-2.
- Shillington, Kevin (2005). Encyclopedia of African History. Vol. 1. New York: Fitzroy Dearborn. ISBN 978-1-57958-245-6.

=== Press sources ===
- Hailey, Foster (November 18, 1958). "SUDAN COUP PUTS ARMY IN CONTROL; Capital Is Quiet as General Takes Power -- Parliament Ousted in Orderly Shift". The New York Times.
- "Golpe militar abala Sudão". Folha de S.Paulo. November 18, 2008.
