= Benjamin Lwoki =

Sudanese politician

Benjamin Lwoki was a politician from South Sudan who was an early activist in the movement for autonomy or independence from Sudan. He was also a former minister of public works-( Sudan), the first South Sudanese politician in the Sudanese cabinet. Benjamin Lwoki was resilient with his motive to make South Sudan an independent nation, and cement the sovereignty of "Junub Sudan"

Benjamin Lwoki belonged to the Pojulu people, as did Aggrey Jaden. In the period leading up to independence he was president of the Liberal party. Faced with insistence that the language of Sudan would be Arabic, taught throughout the country, in a 1954 telegram to Harold Macmillan he refused to support a declaration of independence.

After General Ibrahim Abboud yielded power in November 1964 to the interim government of Sirr al-Khatim Khalifa, all dissident parties and movements were invited to a round table conference. Benjamin Lwoki chaired the conference, which tried to resolve differences and decide on how to achieve national unity. The main decisions were that South Sudan should have self-government, and that it should have a university, schools and hospitals, and a bridge over the Nile at Juba to link east to west.
