= Republic of the Sudan (1956–1969) =

Defunct state in Northeast Africa

Coordinates: 15°38′N 032°32′E

Republic of the Sudan جمهورية السودان (Arabic) Jumhūriyyat as-Sūdān
- 1956–1969
- Flag (1956–1970) Emblem (1956–1970)
- Motto: النصر لنا an-Naṣr lanā "Victory is ours"
- Anthem: نحن جند الله، جند الوطن; Naḥnu Jund Allah, Jund Al-waṭan "We are Soldiers of God, Soldiers of the Homeland"
- Capital: Khartoum
- Common languages: Arabic; English; Regional languages
- Religion: Sunni Islam; Christianity; Animism
- Demonym: Sudanese
- Government: Parliamentary republic (1956–1958; 1964–1969); Military dictatorship (1958–1964)
- President
  - 1956–1958: Sovereignty Council
  - 1958–1964: Ibrahim Abboud
  - 1964–1965: Sovereignty Council
  - 1965–1969: Ismail al-Azhari with Sovereignty Council
- Prime minister
  - 1956: Ismail al-Azhari
  - 1956–1958: Abdallah Khalil
  - 1958–1964: Ibrahim Abboud
  - 1964–1965: Sirr Al-Khatim Al-Khalifa
  - 1965–1966: Muhammad Ahmad Mahgoub
  - 1966–1967: Sadiq al-Mahdi
  - 1967–1969: Muhammad Ahmad Mahgoub
- Legislature: Parliament
- Historical era: Cold War
  - Independence: 1 January 1956
  - Disestablished: 25 May 1969

Area
  - Total: 2,530,397 km^{2} (976,992 sq mi) (9th)
- Currency: Sudanese pound
Preceded by	Succeeded by
Anglo-Egyptian Sudan; Republic of Egypt	Democratic Republic of the Sudan
- Today part of: Sudan; South Sudan

The Republic of the Sudan was established as an independent sovereign state upon the termination of the condominium of Anglo-Egyptian Sudan, over which sovereignty had been vested jointly in Egypt and the United Kingdom. On December 19, 1955, the Sudanese parliament, under Ismail al-Azhari's leadership, unanimously adopted a declaration of independence that became effective on January 1, 1956. During the early years of the Republic, despite political divisions, a parliamentary system was established with a five-member Supreme Commission as head of state. In 1958, after a military coup, General Ibrahim Abboud was installed as president. This government was disestablished when a coup led by Colonel Gaafar Nimeiry founded the Democratic Republic of the Sudan in 1969.

== Background ==
Before 1955, however, whilst still subject to the condominium, the autonomous Sudanese government under Ismail al-Azhari had temporarily halted Sudan's progress toward self-determination, hoping to promote unity with Egypt. Despite his pro-Egyptian National Unionist Party (NUP) winning a majority in the 1953 parliamentary elections, Azhari realized that popular opinion had shifted against such a union. Azhari, who had been the major spokesman for the "unity of the Nile Valley", therefore reversed the NUP's stand and supported Sudanese independence. Azhari called for the withdrawal of foreign troops and requested the governments of Egypt and the United Kingdom to sponsor a plebiscite in advance.

== Politics of independence ==
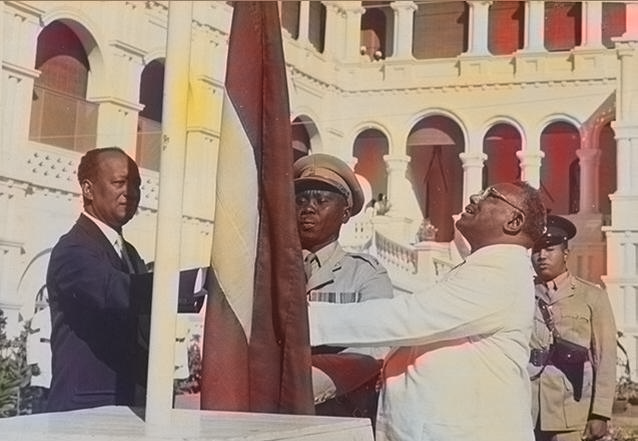
Sudan's flag raised at independence ceremony by the Prime Minister Isma'il Alazhari and opposition leader Muhammad Ahmad Mahgoub on 1 January 1956

Sudan achieved independence without the rival political parties' having agreed on the form and content of a permanent constitution. Instead, the Constituent Assembly adopted a document known as the Transitional Constitution, which replaced the governor-general as head of state with a five-member Supreme Commission that was elected by a parliament composed of an indirectly elected Senate and a popularly elected House of Representatives. The Transitional Constitution also allocated executive power to the prime minister, who was nominated by the House of Representatives and confirmed in office by the Supreme Commission.

Although it achieved independence without conflict, Sudan inherited many problems from the condominium. Chief among these was the status of the civil service. The government placed Sudanese in the administration and provided compensation and pensions for British officers of Sudan Political Service who left the country; it retained those who could not be replaced, mostly technicians and teachers. Khartoum achieved this transformation quickly and with a minimum of turbulence, although southerners resented the replacement of British administrators in the south with northern Sudanese. To advance their interests, many southern leaders concentrated their efforts in Khartoum, where they hoped to win constitutional concessions. Although determined to resist what they perceived to be Arab imperialism, they were opposed to violence. Most southern representatives supported provincial autonomy and warned that failure to win legal concessions would drive the south to rebellion.

The parliamentary regime introduced plans to expand the country's education, economic, and transportation sectors. To achieve these goals, Khartoum needed foreign economic and technical assistance, to which the United States made an early commitment. Conversations between the two governments had begun in mid-1957, and the parliament ratified a United States aid agreement in July 1958. Washington hoped this agreement would reduce Sudan's excessive reliance on a one-crop (cotton) economy and would facilitate the development of the country's transportation and communications infrastructure.

The prime minister formed a coalition government in February 1956, but he alienated the Khatmiyyah by supporting increasingly secular government policies. In June, some Khatmiyyah members who had defected from the NUP established the People's Democratic Party (PDP) under Ahmed al-Mirghani's leadership. The Umma and the PDP combined in parliament to bring down the Azhari government. With support from the two parties and backing from the Ansar and the Khatmiyyah, Abdallah Khalil put together a coalition government.

Major issues confronting Khalil's coalition government included winning agreement on a permanent constitution, stabilizing the south, encouraging economic development, and improving relations with Egypt. Strains within the Umma-PDP coalition hampered the government's ability to make progress on these matters. The Umma, for example, wanted the proposed constitution to institute a presidential form of government on the assumption that Abd al-Rahman al-Mahdi would be elected the first president. The consensus was lacking about the country's economic future. A poor cotton harvest followed the 1957 bumper cotton crop, which Sudan had been unable to sell at a good price in a glutted market. This downturn depleted Sudan's reserves and caused unrest over government-imposed economic restrictions. To overcome these problems and finance future development projects, the Umma called for greater reliance on foreign aid. The PDP, however, objected to this strategy because it promoted unacceptable foreign influence in Sudan. The PDP's philosophy reflected the Arab nationalism espoused by Gamal Abdel Nasser, who had replaced Egyptian leader Naguib in 1954. Despite these policy differences, the Umma-PDP coalition lasted for the remaining year of the parliament's tenure. Moreover, after the parliament adjourned, the two parties promised to maintain a common front for the 1958 elections.

The electorate gave a plurality in both houses to the Umma and an overall majority to the Umma-PDP coalition. The NUP, however, won nearly one-quarter of the seats, largely from urban centers and from Gezira Scheme agricultural workers. In the south, the vote represented a rejection of the men who had cooperated with the government—voters defeated all three southerners in the preelection cabinet—and a victory for advocates of autonomy within a federal system. Resentment against the government's taking over mission schools and against the measures used in suppressing the 1955 mutiny contributed to the election of several candidates who had been implicated in the rebellion.

After the new parliament convened, Khalil again formed an Umma-PDP coalition government. Unfortunately, factionalism, corruption, and vote fraud dominated parliamentary deliberations at a time when the country needed decisive action with regard to the proposed constitution and the future of the south. As a result, the Umma-PDP coalition failed to exercise effective leadership.

Another issue that divided the parliament concerned Sudanese-United States relations. In March 1958, Khalil signed a technical assistance agreement with the United States. When he presented the pact to parliament for ratification, he discovered that the NUP wanted to use the issue to defeat the Umma-PDP coalition and that many PDP delegates opposed the agreement. Nevertheless, the Umma, with the support of some PDP and southern delegates, managed to obtain approval of the agreement.

Factionalism and bribery in parliament, coupled with the government's inability to resolve Sudan's many social, political, and economic problems, increased popular disillusion with a democratic government. Specific complaints included Khartoum's decision to sell cotton at a price above world market prices. This policy resulted in low sales of cotton, the commodity from which Sudan derived most of its income. Restrictions on imports imposed to take the pressure off depleted foreign exchange reserves caused consternation among town dwellers who had become accustomed to buying foreign goods. Moreover, rural northerners also suffered from an embargo that Egypt placed on imports of cattle, camels, and dates from Sudan. Growing popular discontent caused many anti-government demonstrations in Khartoum. Egypt also criticized Khalil and suggested that it might support a coup against his government. Meanwhile, reports circulated in Khartoum that the Umma and the NUP were near agreement on a new coalition that would exclude the PDP and Khalil.

On November 17, 1958, the day parliament was to convene, a military coup occurred. Khalil, himself a retired army general, planned the preemptive coup in conjunction with leading Umma members and the army's two senior generals, Ibrahim Abboud and Ahmad Abd al Wahab, who became leaders of the military regime. Abboud immediately pledged to resolve all disputes with Egypt, including the long-standing problem of the status of the Nile River. Abboud abandoned the previous government's unrealistic policies regarding the sale of cotton. He also appointed a constitutional commission, headed by the chief justice, to draft a permanent constitution. Abboud maintained, however, that political parties only served as vehicles for personal ambitions and that they would not be reestablished when civilian rule was restored.

== Abboud military government (1958–1964) ==
The coup removed political decision making from civilian control. Abboud created the Supreme Council of the Armed Forces to rule Sudan. This body contained officers affiliated with the Ansar and the Khatmiyyah. Abboud belonged to the Khatmiyyah, whereas Abd al Wahab was a member of the Ansar. Until Abd al Wahab's removal in March 1959, the Ansar were the stronger of the two groups in the government.

The regime benefited during its first year in office from the successful marketing of the cotton crop. Abboud also profited from the settlement of the Nile waters dispute with Egypt and the improvement of relations between the two countries. Under the military regime, the influence of the Ansar and the Khatmiyyah lessened. The strongest religious leader, Abd al-Rahman al-Mahdi, died in early 1959. His son and successor, the elder Sadiq al Mahdi, failed to enjoy the respect accorded his father. When Sadiq died two years later, Ansar religious and political leadership divided between his brother, Imam Al-Hadi al-Mahdi, and his son, the younger Sadiq al-Mahdi.

Despite the Abboud regime's early successes, opposition elements remained powerful. In 1959, dissident military officers made three attempts to displace Abboud with a "popular government." Although the courts sentenced the leaders of these attempted coups to life imprisonment, discontent in the military continued to hamper the government's performance. In particular, the Sudanese Communist Party (SCP) gained a reputation as an effective anti-government organization. To compound its problems, the Abboud regime lacked dynamism and the ability to stabilize the country. Its failure to place capable civilian advisers in positions of authority, or to launch a credible economic and social development program, and gain the army's support, created an atmosphere that encouraged political turbulence.

Abboud's Southern Policy proved to be his undoing. The government suppressed expressions of religious and cultural differences that bolstered attempts to Arabize society. In February 1964, for example, Abboud ordered the mass expulsion of foreign missionaries from the south. He then closed parliament to cut off outlets for southern complaints. In 1963, southern leaders had renewed the armed struggle against the Sudanese government that had continued sporadically since 1955. The rebellion was spearheaded from 1963 by guerrilla forces known as the Anyanya (the name of a poisonous concoction).

== Return to civilian rule (1964–1969) ==
=== October 1964 Revolution ===
Recognizing its inability to quell growing southern discontent, the Abboud government asked the civilian sector to submit proposals for a solution to the southern problem. However, criticism of government policy quickly went beyond the southern issue and included Abboud's handling of other problems, such as the economy and education. Government attempts to silence these protests – which were centered in the University of Khartoum – brought a reaction not only from teachers and students but also from Khartoum's civil servants and trade unionists.

The specific incident that triggered what later became known as the October Revolution was the storming of a seminar at the University of Khartoum on "the Problem of the Southern Sudan" by riot police on the evening of 20 October 1964. The police killed three people in their attack; two students, Ahmed al-Gurashi Taha from Garrasa in the White Nile and Babiker Abdel Hafiz from Wad-Duroo in Omdurman, and a University of Khartoum manual labourer, Mabior, from the southern part of Sudan. Protests started the following day, 21 October, spreading across Sudan. Artists including Mohammed Wardi and Mohammed al-Amin encouraged the protestors. According to Mahmoud A. Suleiman, deputy chairman of the Justice and Equality Movement in 2012, "the main reason for the October Revolution was the Sudanese people's dislike of being ruled by military totalitarian regimes."

The civil disobedience movement triggered by the 20 October seminar raid included a general strike that spread rapidly throughout Sudan. Strike leaders identified themselves as the National Front for Professionals. Along with some former politicians, they formed the leftist United National Front (UNF), which made contact with dissident army officers. After several days of protests that resulted in many deaths, Abboud dissolved the government and the Supreme Council of the Armed Forces. UNF leaders and army commanders who planned the transition from military to civilian rule selected a nonpolitical senior civil servant, Sirr Al-Khatim Al-Khalifa, as prime minister to head a transitional government.

=== Post-October 1964 ===
The new civilian government, which operated under the 1956 Transitional Constitution, tried to end political factionalism by establishing a coalition government. There was continued popular hostility to the reappearance of political parties, however, because of their divisiveness during the Abbud government. Although the new government allowed all parties, including the SCP, to operate, only five of fifteen posts in Khatim's cabinet went to party politicians. The prime minister gave two positions to nonparty southerners and the remaining eight to members of the National Front for Professionals, which included several communists.

Eventually two political parties emerged to represent the south. The SANU, founded in 1963 and led by William Deng and Saturnino Ohure – a Roman Catholic priest – operated among refugee groups and guerrilla forces. The Southern Front, a mass organization led by Stanislaus Payasama that had worked underground during the Abbud government, functioned openly within the southern provinces. After the collapse of government-sponsored peace conferences in 1965, Deng's wing of SANU—known locally as SANU-William—and the Southern Front coalesced to take part in the parliamentary elections. The grouping remained active in parliament for the next four years as a voice for southern regional autonomy within a unified state. Exiled SANU leaders baulked at Deng's moderate approach to form the Azania Liberation Front based in Kampala, Uganda. Anyanya leaders tended to remain aloof from political movements. The guerrillas were fragmented by ethnic and religious differences. Additionally, conflicts resurfaced within Anyanya between older leaders who had been in the bush since 1955, and younger, better educated men like Joseph Lagu, a former Sudanese army captain, who eventually became a stronger leader, largely because of his ability to get arms from Israel.

When the government scheduled national elections for March 1965, they announced that the new parliament's task would be to prepare a new constitution. The deteriorating southern security situation prevented elections from being conducted in that region, however, and the political parties split on the question of whether elections should be held in the north as scheduled or postponed until the whole country could vote. The People's Democratic Party and the Sudanese Communist Party, both fearful of losing votes, wanted to postpone the elections, as did southern elements loyal to Khartoum. Their opposition forced the government to resign. The new president of the reinstated Supreme Commission, who had replaced Abbud as chief of state, directed that the elections be held wherever possible; the PDP rejected this decision and boycotted the elections.

The 1965 election results were inconclusive. Apart from a low voter turnout, there was a confusing overabundance of candidates on the ballots. As a consequence few of those elected won a majority of the votes cast. The non-Marxist Umma Party captured 75 out of 158 parliamentary seats while its NUP ally took 52 of the remainder. The two parties formed a coalition cabinet in June headed by Umma leader Muhammad Ahmad Mahjub, whereas Azhari, the NUP leader, became the Supreme Commission's permanent president and chief of state.

The Mahjub government had two goals: progress toward solving the southern problem and the removal of communists from positions of power. The army launched a major offensive to crush the rebellion and in the process augmented its reputation for brutality among the southerners. Many southerners reported government atrocities against civilians, especially at Juba and Wau. Sudanese army troops also burned churches and huts, closed schools, destroyed crops and looted cattle. To achieve his second objective, Mahjub succeeded in having parliament approve a decree that abolished the SCP and deprived the eleven communists of their seats. By October 1965, the Umma-NUP coalition had collapsed owing to a disagreement over whether Mahjub, as prime minister, or Azhari, as president, should conduct Sudan's foreign relations. Mahjub continued in office for another eight months but resigned in July 1966 after a parliamentary vote of censure, which split Umma. A traditional wing led by Mahjub, under the Imam Al Hadi, al Mahjub's spiritual leadership, opposed the party's majority. The latter group professed loyalty to the Imam's nephew, the younger Sadiq al Mahdi, who was the Umma's official leader and who rejected religious sectarianism. Sadiq became prime minister with backing from his own Umma wing and from NUP allies.

The Sadiq al Mahdi government, supported by a sizeable parliamentary majority, sought to reduce regional disparities by organizing economic development. Sadiq al Mahdi also planned to use his personal rapport with southern leaders to engineer a peace agreement with the insurgents. He proposed to replace the Supreme Commission with a president and a southern vice president calling for approval of autonomy for the southern provinces. The educated elite and segments of the army opposed Sadiq al Mahdi because of his gradualist approach to Sudan's political, economic, and social problems. Leftist student organizations and the trade unions demanded the creation of a socialist state. Their resentment of Sadiq increased when he refused to honour a Supreme Court ruling that overturned legislation banning the SCP and ousting communists elected to parliamentary seats. In December 1966, a coup attempt by communists and a small army unit against the government failed. Many communists and army personnel were subsequently arrested.

In March 1967, the government held elections in thirty-six constituencies in pacified areas of the south. Sadiq al Mahdi's wing of the Umma won fifteen seats, the federalist SANU ten, and the NUP five. Despite this apparent boost in his support, Sadiq's position in parliament had become tenuous: concessions he had promised to the south in order to bring an end to the civil war were not agreed. The Umma traditionalist wing opposed Sadiq al Mahdi: they argued strongly against constitutional guarantees for religious freedom and his refusal to declare Sudan an Islamic state. When the traditionalists and the NUP withdrew their support, the government fell.

In May 1967, Mahjub became prime minister and head of a coalition government whose cabinet included members of his wing of the Umma, of the NUP, and of the PDP. In December 1967, the PDP and the NUP formed the DUP under Azhari's leadership. By early 1968, widening divisions in the Umma threatened the survival of the Mahjub government. Sadiq al Mahdi's wing held a majority in parliament and could thwart any government action. When Mahjub dissolved parliament Sadiq refused to recognize the legitimacy of the prime minister's action. An uneasy crisis developed: two governments functioned in Khartoum — one meeting in the parliament building and the other on its lawn — both of them claimed to represent the legislature's will. The army commander requested clarification from the Supreme Court regarding which of them had authority to issue orders. The court backed Mahjub's dissolution; and the government scheduled new elections for April.

Although the DUP won 101 of 218 seats, no single party controlled a parliamentary majority. Thirty-six seats went to the Umma traditionalists, thirty to the Sadiq wing, and twenty-five to the two southern parties—SANU and the Southern Front. The SCP secretary general, Abdel Khaliq Mahjub, also won a seat. In a major setback, Sadiq lost his own seat to a traditionalist rival. Because it lacked a majority, the DUP created an alliance with the Umma traditionalists, who received the prime ministership for their leader, Muhammad Ahmad Mahjub, and four other cabinet posts. The coalition's program included plans for government reorganization, closer ties with the Arab world, and renewed economic development efforts, particularly in the southern provinces. The Muhammad Ahmad Mahjub government also accepted military, technical, and economic aid from the Soviet Union. Sadiq al Mahdi's wing of the Umma formed the small parliamentary opposition. When it refused to participate in efforts to complete the draft constitution, already ten years overdue, the government retaliated by closing the opposition's newspaper and clamping down on pro-Sadiq demonstrations in Khartoum.

By late 1968, the two Umma wings agreed to support the Ansar chief Imam al-Hadi al-Mahdi in the 1969 presidential election. At the same time, the DUP announced that Azhari also would seek the presidency. The communists and other leftists aligned themselves behind the presidential candidacy of former Chief Justice Babiker Awadallah, whom they viewed as an ally because he had ruled against the government when it attempted to outlaw the SCP.

== See also ==
- History of Sudan
- 1956 Sudan independence-related awards

== Sources ==
- Mohamed Hassan Fadlalla, Short History of Sudan, iUniverse, 30 April 2004, ISBN 0-595-31425-2.
- Mohamed Hassan Fadlalla, The Problem of Dar Fur, iUniverse, Inc. (July 21, 2005), ISBN 978-0-595-36502-9.
