= Abdallah Khalil =

Prime Minister of Sudan (1956–1958)

- عبد الله خليل
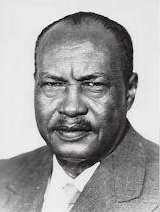
- Khalil in 1950

2nd Prime Minister of Sudan
- In office 5 July 1956 – 17 November 1958
- President: Sovereignty Council
- Preceded by: Ismail al-Azhari
- Succeeded by: Ibrahim Abboud

Personal details
- Born: 1892 Omdurman, Mahdist Sudan
- Died: 23 August 1970 (aged 77–78) Khartoum, Democratic Republic of Sudan
- Party: National Umma Party

Military service
- Allegiance: Egypt; Anglo-Egyptian Sudan
- Branch/service: Egyptian Army (1910–1924); Sudan Defence Force (1925–1944)
- Years of service: 1910–1944
- Rank: Brigadier

Sayed Abdallah Khalil (Arabic: عبد الله خليل, romanized: ʻAbd Allāh Khalīl; 1892 – 23 August 1970) was a Sudanese politician who served as the second prime minister of Sudan.

== Early life ==
Khalil was born in Omdurman and was of Kenzi Nubian origin.

== Military service ==
Khalil served in the Egyptian Army from 1910 to 1924, and the Sudan Defence Force from 1925 until 1944. He was the first Sudanese to reach the rank of brigadier (Miralai).

== Political career ==
In 1944 Khalil became an influential member of the Advisory Council for the Northern Sudan, which became a pro-Mahdist organisation. In 1945 Khalil helped found the Umma Party, and became the party's first Secretary General. In 1947 he became a member of the Independence Front, serving as a representative of Umma Party interests, opposing the dominant Khatmiyya interests.

Khalil maintained a close relationship with Colonial Administrators Robert George Howe and J. W. Robertson, often serving as an advocate for their views on Sudanese politics. Khalil's constant struggle with the Khatmiyya is often criticized, with it being alleged that he helped to make the emerging Sudanese nationalism divisive and sectarian. Khalil was for instance appointed Minister of Agriculture in 1947, largely due to his insistence that this was necessary to counterbalance the strong role of the Khatmiyya and to respond to the Sudanization press.

In 1948 Khalil became leader of the newly formed Legislative Assembly and Executive Council, serving the Umma Party's representative on the Constitutional Commission. Khalil was elected to parliament in the 1953 parliamentary election.

Following the 1958 election Khalil formed a coalition government comprising his Umma Party and the People's Democratic Party. Khalil served as Prime Minister and Minister of Defence in the new government. He allied Sudan with the United States, sparking a tense standoff with Egypt under Gamal Abdel Nasser. On November 17, 1958, Khalil carried out a military coup against his own government, putting the government under the control of a military junta. (See History of Sudan (Independent Sudan))
