= Turco-Egyptian conquest of Sudan (1820–1824) =

Military campaign, 1820–1824

- Part of the campaigns of Muhammad Ali of Egypt
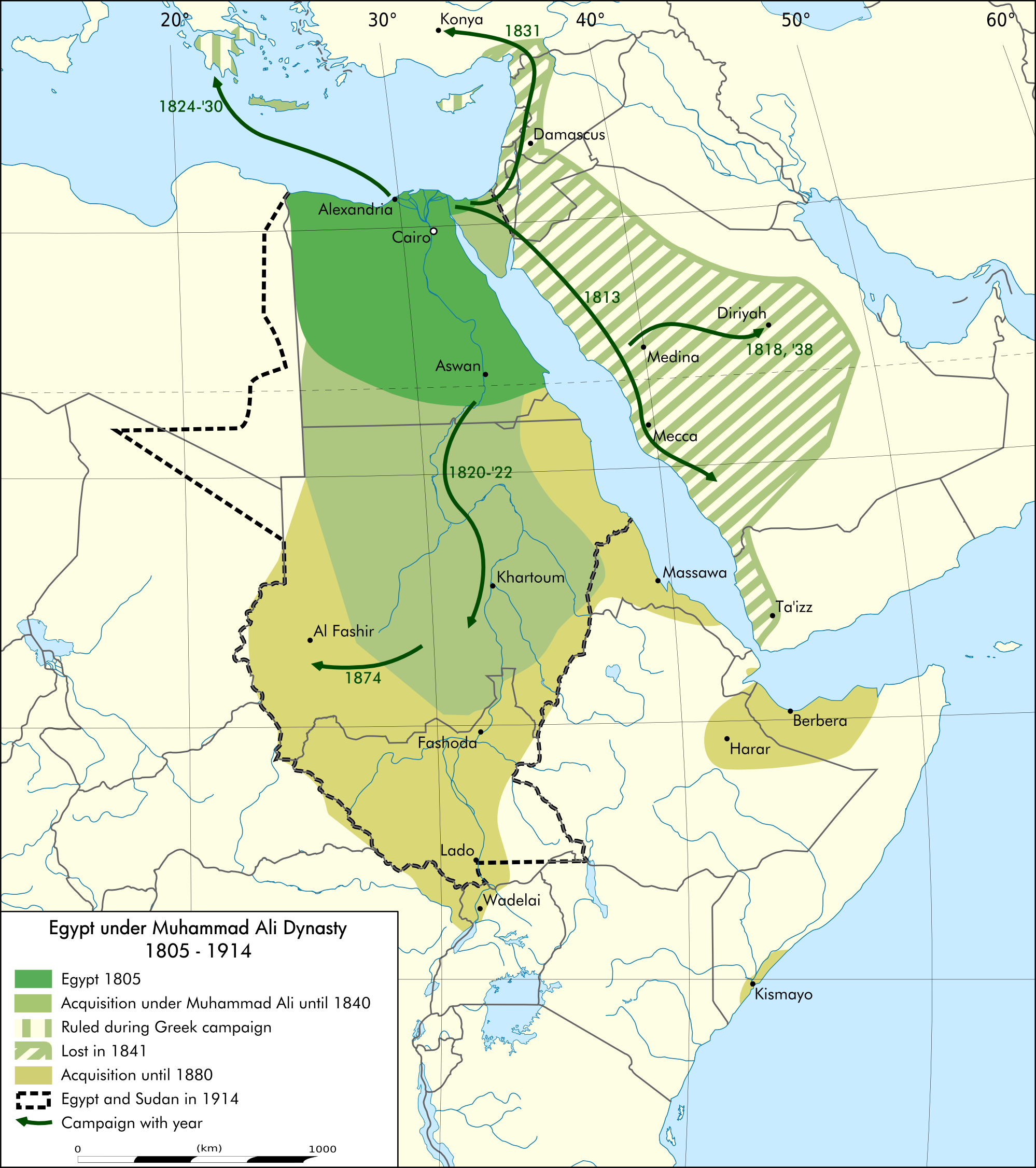
- Egyptian expansion under Muhammad Ali dynasty
Date	1820–1824
Location	Sudan
Result	Turco-Egyptian victory

Belligerents
Egypt	Sennar Sultanate; Shayqih Kingdom; Sultanate of Darfur

Commanders and leaders
(Ottoman Egypt) Muhammad Ali	Badi VII

Strength
4,000 men (1820); 8,000 men (1823)	Unknown

The Turco-Egyptian conquest of Sudan was a major military and technical feat. Fewer than 10,000 men set off from Egypt, but, with some local assistance, they were able to penetrate 1,500 km up the Nile River to the frontiers of Ethiopia, giving Egypt an empire as large as Western Europe.

The conquest marked the first time an invasion from the north penetrated so deeply into Sudan. The campaign required two difficult and unprecedented desert crossings and the use of explosives to clear a passage along the Nile River. The invading army, sent by Muhammad Ali Pasha, consisted of approximately 4,000 troops in 1820, many of them Albanian soldiers who formed the core of his early military forces supported by Ottoman officers, artillery, and Bedouin auxiliaries. Despite its relatively small size, the force possessed modern training, firearms, and artillery, allowing it to defeat much larger local armies. Together with the campaigns and expeditions which followed it, the conquest roughly established the post-independence borders of Sudan. The invading forces also made their headquarters at Khartoum in May 1821, from which time it soon developed into Sudan's capital city.

== Background ==
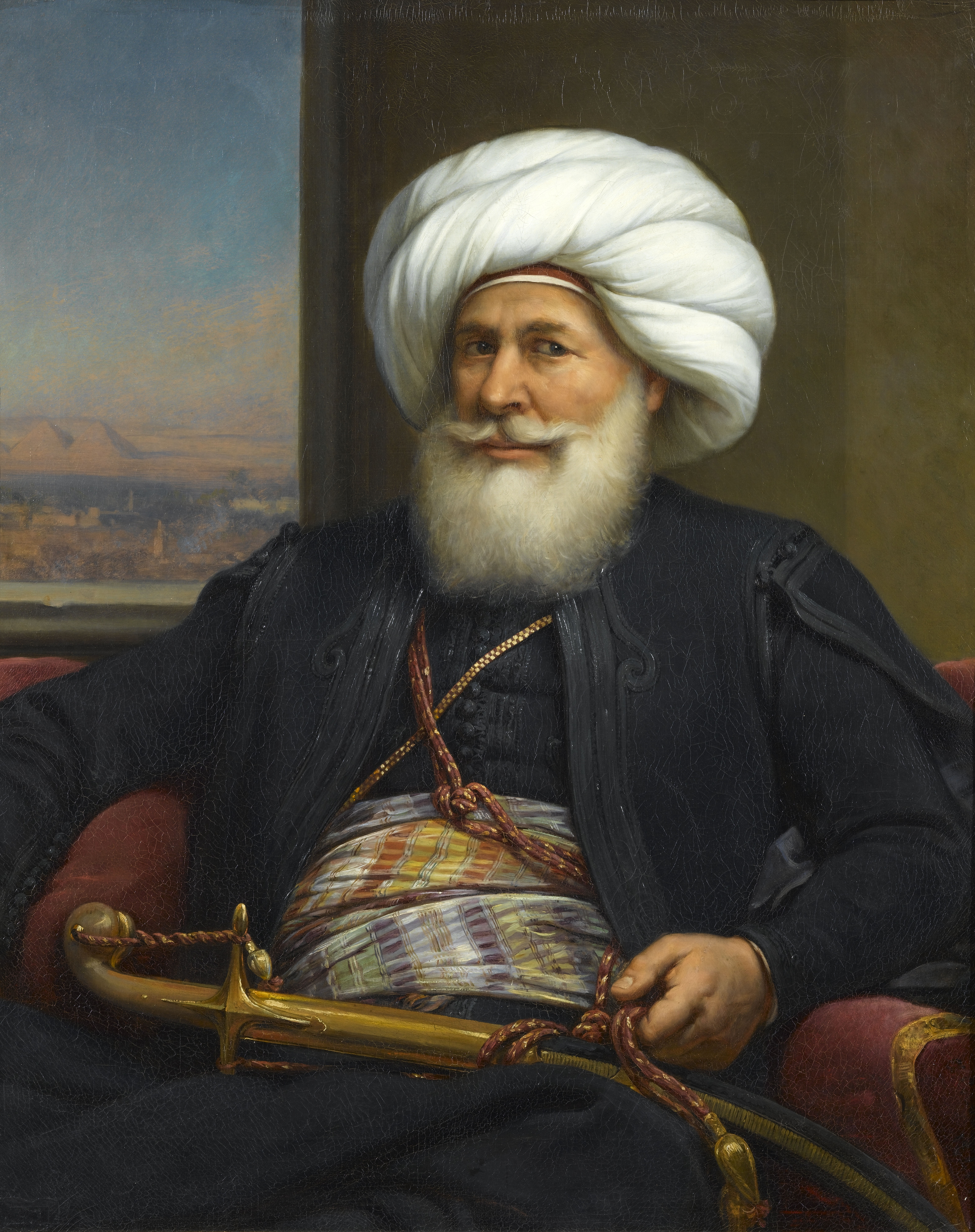
1841 portrait of Muhammad Ali by Auguste Couder

You are aware that the end of all our effort and this expense is to procure negroes. Please show zeal in carrying out our wishes in the capital matter.

— Muhammad Ali to his son in law the Defterdar Muhammad Bey Khusraw, 23 September 1823)

Muhammad Ali, the Khedive of Egypt, wanted a large and steady supply of slaves to train into a modern army to deploy in other parts of his empire to further his grand territorial ambitions. An army of Sudanese slaves would enable him to dispense with the mutinous Albanian and Turkish troops on whom he had been obliged to rely on until then. After the conquest, Muhammad Ali constantly urged his commanders in Sudan to collect and send as many slaves as they could to the training camps at Aswan. Those who proved unfit for military service would be put to work in his many agricultural and industrial projects.

In addition, when Muhammad Ali had exterminated the Mamluks in Egypt in 1811, a remnant of them had fled south into Sudan and established themselves at Dongola. Although they posed no immediate threat, it was not uncommon for a defeated faction in Egyptian power struggles to flee upstream, waiting for the opportunity to descend once more on Cairo when circumstances changed in their favour. In 1812 Muhammad Ali had sent an embassy to the Funj Sultanate of Sennar asking them to clear the Mamluks out of Dongola, but neither the Funj rulers nor the Hamaj Regency had the military resources to do so.

Muhammad Ali also believed that Sudan contained rich seams of gold, though he never found any that were commercially viable.

== Invasion of Nubia ==
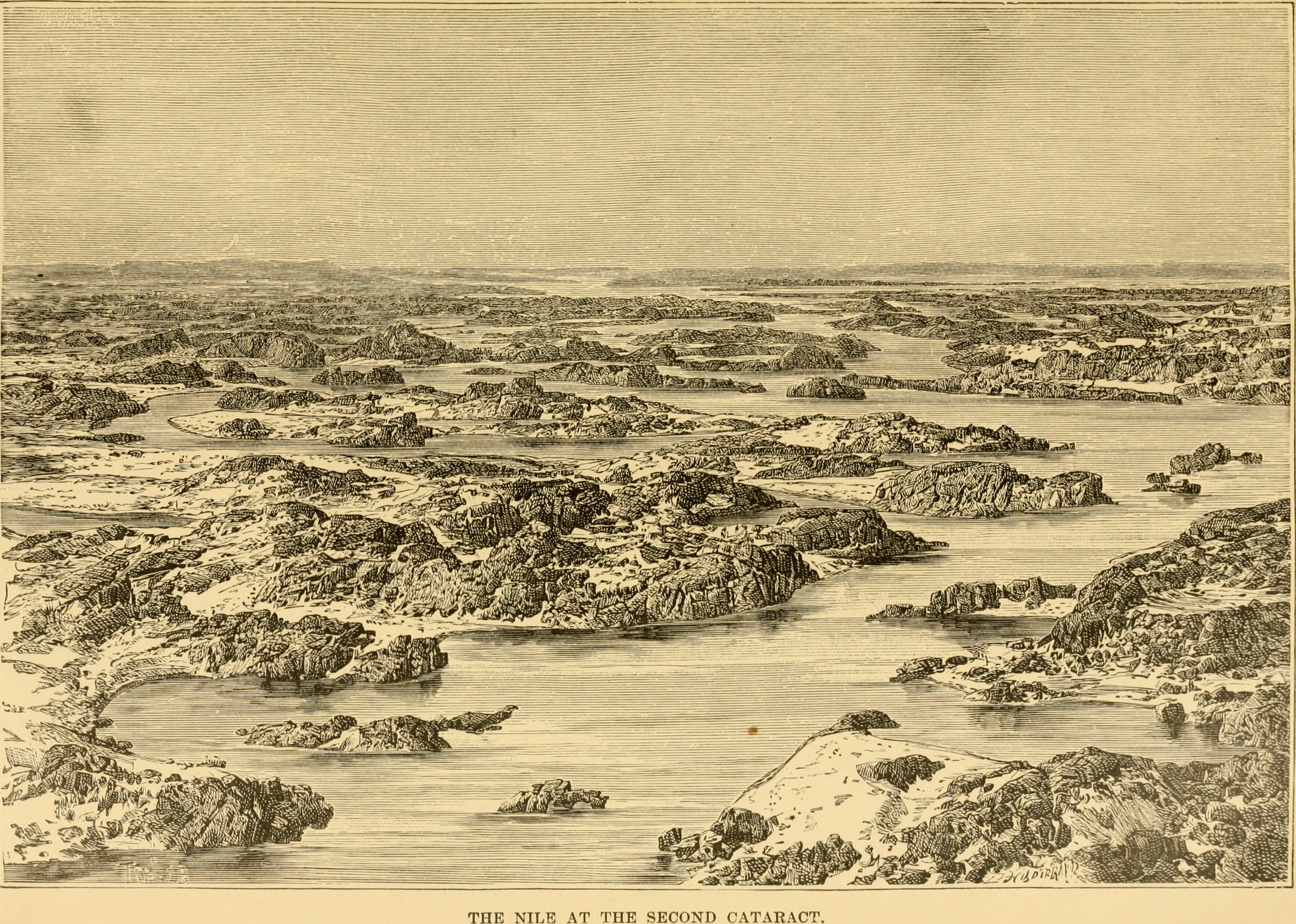
The second cataract of the Nile, illustrated in 1886, after Ismail's forces made it navigable

The invasion force of about 4,000 left Cairo in July 1820. It was composed of Turks, Albanians and other Turkish-speaking troops, as well as many Bedouin tribal forces that later inhabited Sudan. The conscription of the Egyptian peasantry had not yet begun, so regular Egyptian forces played no part in it. Commanding the troops was Muhammad Ali's third son, the 25-year-old Ismail Kamil Pasha, who joined his army at Aswan on 20 July. Second in command was a trusted Albanian officer, Abidin Bey.

Camel support was provided by Ababda tribesmen who knew the frontier regions well. The Ababda had traditionally levied a toll on all caravans of gold and slaves approaching Egypt from Sudan and in return for their support during the invasion, the Egyptian government confirmed their control of the route, allowing them to charge a 10% toll on all goods passing through their land in future.

The timing of the invasion was dictated by the flooding of the Nile, as the Egyptians planned to sail supply ships up over the cataracts of the Nile, and the season where the river was high enough to allow this was limited. Ismail's forces used explosives to blow open a navigable waterway through the second cataract so his ships could pass through to the south. As the army advanced, they received the submission of the kashif of Lower Nubia, which was only nominally subject to Ottoman rule, and when they passed the second cataract, the ruler of Say likewise submitted, although he later rebelled and was killed in the fighting. The people of Say were descendants of Bosniak soldiery posted there long ago, and were described as 'white as the Arabs of lower Egypt'. At Dongola some of the Mamluks submitted and others fled upstream to take refuge with Mek Nimr of Shendi.

== Defeat of the Shaygiyya ==
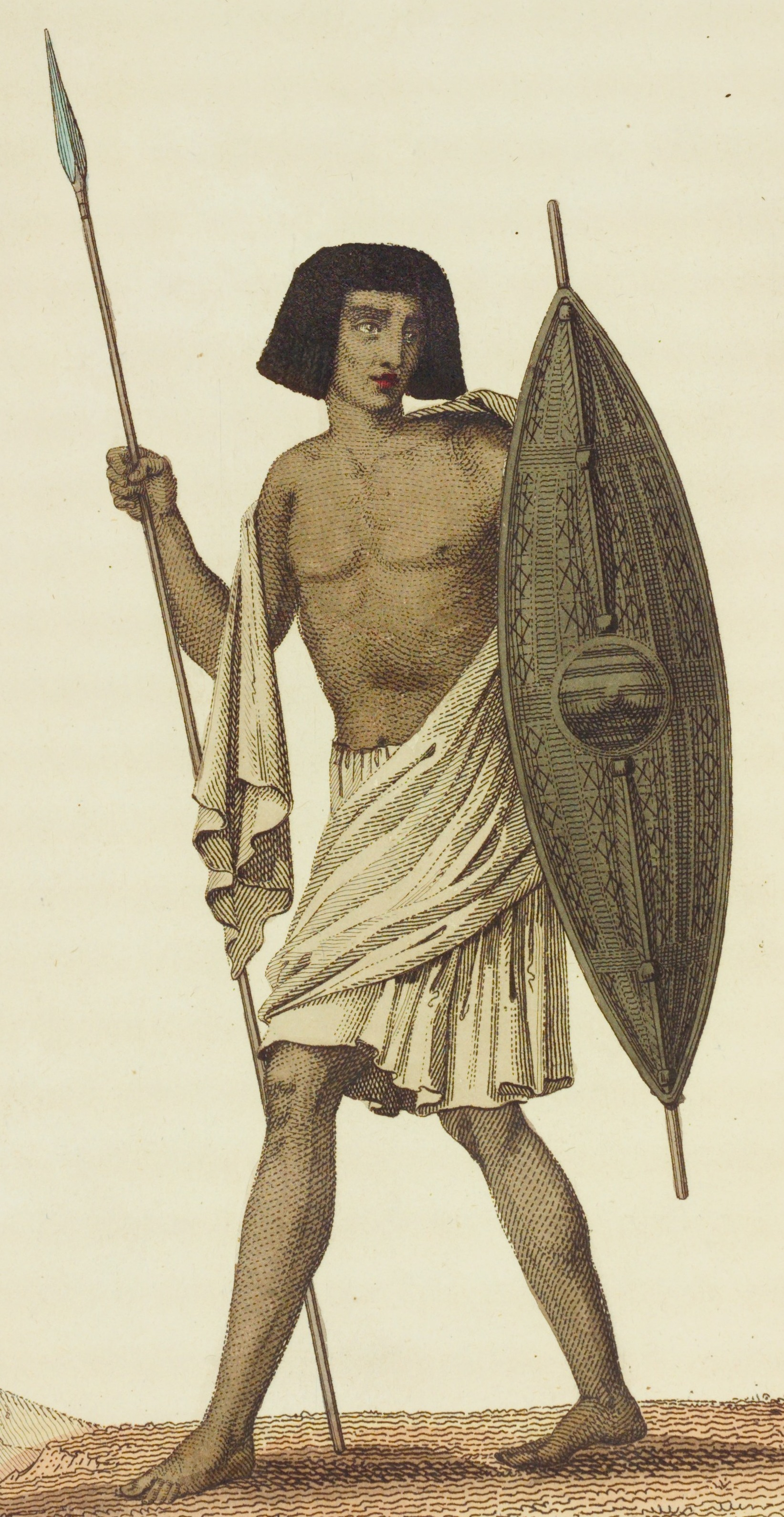
A Shaigiya warrior in 1821 after Frédéric Cailliaud, who accompanied the invasion.

The main military opposition to the Egyptians came from the powerful Shaigiya confederation, which was defeated on 4 November 1820 at the battle of Korti. At the van of the Shaigiya forces was a young girl, Mihera Bint Abboud, on a richly decorated camel, who gave the signal to attack. This may have been a tradition deriving from the legendary exploits of the seventeenth-century woman warrior Azila, famous for her martial skills and for being in the thick of every fight. The Shaigiya fought with swords and lances, disdaining the use of firearms. The bold assault by Shaigiya cavalry was broken up by Egyptian firearms; they retreated with the loss of some fifty Shaigiya and 600–800 Nubian auxiliaries dead. The Egyptians could not use their artillery as it was still being transported upriver by boat.

After the battle, Ismail promised his soldiers a reward of 50 piastres for each pair of enemy ears they brought him. This led to the mutilation of civilians as the Egyptian troops, after they had mutilated the Shaigiya dead, spread out into local villages and began cutting the ears off anyone they found. Unable to control his troops, Ismail did however manage to save 600 earless women from further outrages by moving them to safety on an island in the Nile.

After this defeat, the Shaigiya withdrew to Jebel Daiqa across the Nile, which Ismail crossed by boat in pursuit. As the Shaigiya had lost much of their cavalry, they now conscripted peasant infantry who were blessed by holy men who covered them in dust, telling them it would protect them against bullets. On 2 December the Shaigiya again charged the Egyptian line. However, Ismail had been able to bring up his artillery, which wiped out the Shayqiyya forces. Once again, massacres followed the Egyptian victory.

After this victory, Ismail Pasha pressed on southwards, sending a squadron of riverboats upstream with a protecting escort accompanied along the riverbank. They reached Berber on 5 March, which submitted without fighting. Ismail himself took the bulk of his forces on a march across the Bayuda Desert on 21 February 1821, and reached the Nile at al-Buqayr, south of ad-Damir seven days later. After some negotiations all but a few of the remaining Mamluks submitted and were allowed to return peaceably to Egypt, the few who refused fled deeper into the country but no more is known of them. The various local rulers who had been holding out against the Egyptians all now made terms with them; the remaining Shaigiya, whose cavalry Ismail enlisted into his forces, and the Ja'alin under Mek Nimr of Shendi.

== Submission of Sennar ==
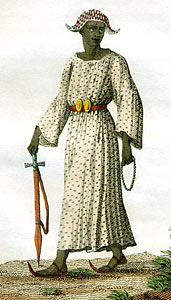
Provincial king of Fazogli

Ismail's army now crossed the White Nile into the Jezirah. Only nine small Egyptian boats had been able to pass the Third Cataract, the remainder were trapped upstream as the annual flooding ended and the water level dropped. As such transporting the men and supplies across the river lasted from 20 May to 1 June. Horses and camels were swum across, or floated with inflated waterskins. There was no opposition from the forces of the Sultanate of Sennar, which was in a state of internal turmoil. The last Funj sultan, Badi VII, surrendered to Ismail on 14 June and the Egyptians occupied Sennar without a fight the next day. Using Sennar as a base, the Egyptians moved upstream along the Blue Nile searching for what they believed to be rich sources of gold. Though they found no gold they captured Fazogli, marking the furthest extent of their conquests in the region, before they turned back. Late in 1821 Ismail was joined by his older brother Ibrahim Pasha at Sennar. Ibrahim had been sent by their father to speed up the conquest of Sudan and deliver larger numbers of captives for slavery in Egypt.

On his way south, Ibrahim established an organised relay of ships on the Nile to transport slaves north in a more systematic fashion. Ibrahim joined Ismail on slaving expeditions before falling ill and returning to Cairo. Apparently the rumour that he had been killed in the Fazogli mountains helped trigger the rebellion which broke out in 1822.

== Kordofan campaign ==
Once the Shayqiyya had surrendered, Muhammad Ali assembled a second army of some 3,000–4,000 men and an artillery battery under his son in law Muhammad Bey Khusraw, the Defterdar (Finance Minister), to conquer the Sultanate of Darfur. The forces assembled at Al Dabbah where they were joined by supporting units of the Kababish tribe who escorted them southwest across the Bayuda Desert into northern Kordofan. The forces of Darfur made the mistake of not attacking them as soon as they emerged from the desert, and waited instead at Bara. There, an enormous force of more than 9,000 Darfuris was defeated by the superior firepower of the Turks, who inflicted a loss of some 1,500 men on the Darfur army. Then, as Ismail had done with the Shayqiyyah, the Defterdar Bey offered a bounty for enemy ears, sacks of which were then sent back to Cairo. Soon after, the Egyptians took and sacked the Kordofani capital Al-Ubayyid. The Sultan of Darfur sent fresh forces from the west, but they too were defeated. Egyptian rule in North Kordofan was now secure, but the Defterday Bey lacked the forces to make a direct assault either on the Nuba mountains or on Darfur itself. Muhammad Ali later sought to gain control in Darfur by backing one claimant against another in a civil war, but this initiative did not succeed.

== Revolt in Shendi and Sennar ==
By the beginning of 1822 all of riverine Sudan and Kordofan was under Egyptian control. A rudimentary military administration was established, under four governors (ma'mūr); Ali-din Agha At Dongola, whose role was to protect the supply lines to Egypt and who was wise enough to impose taxes at a low enough level to avoid revolt; Mahu Bey Urfali (of Kurdish origin) at Berber, who followed his example and maintained a watch on Shendi and the other towns north of the Jazirah; Ismail himself at Sennar, and the Defterdar Bey in Kordofan.

Muhammad Ali constantly admonished his son to use milder methods, to act justly, and to win the people over; at the same time however, he constantly demanded more slaves, which could not be secured without further exactions. Little time was lost in assessing the new territories for taxes, beginning with a census of slaves and flocks. Ismail's secretary Muhammad Said, assisted by Coptic official, Hannah Tawīl, and the former Sennar minister the Arbab Dafa'Allah, devised a system whereby taxes were to be paid at a rate of fifteen dollars per slave, ten per cow and five per sheep or donkey. This rate of taxation was exacting in the extreme, all but amounting to confiscation. Since there was little gold coin in Sudan, the only way most people could pay these taxes was in slaves. This scheme would have centralised all slaving activities in the areas under Egyptian rule, effectively destroying the means of survival of the traders and petty rulers who were economically dependent on the established means of capturing and exchanging slaves.

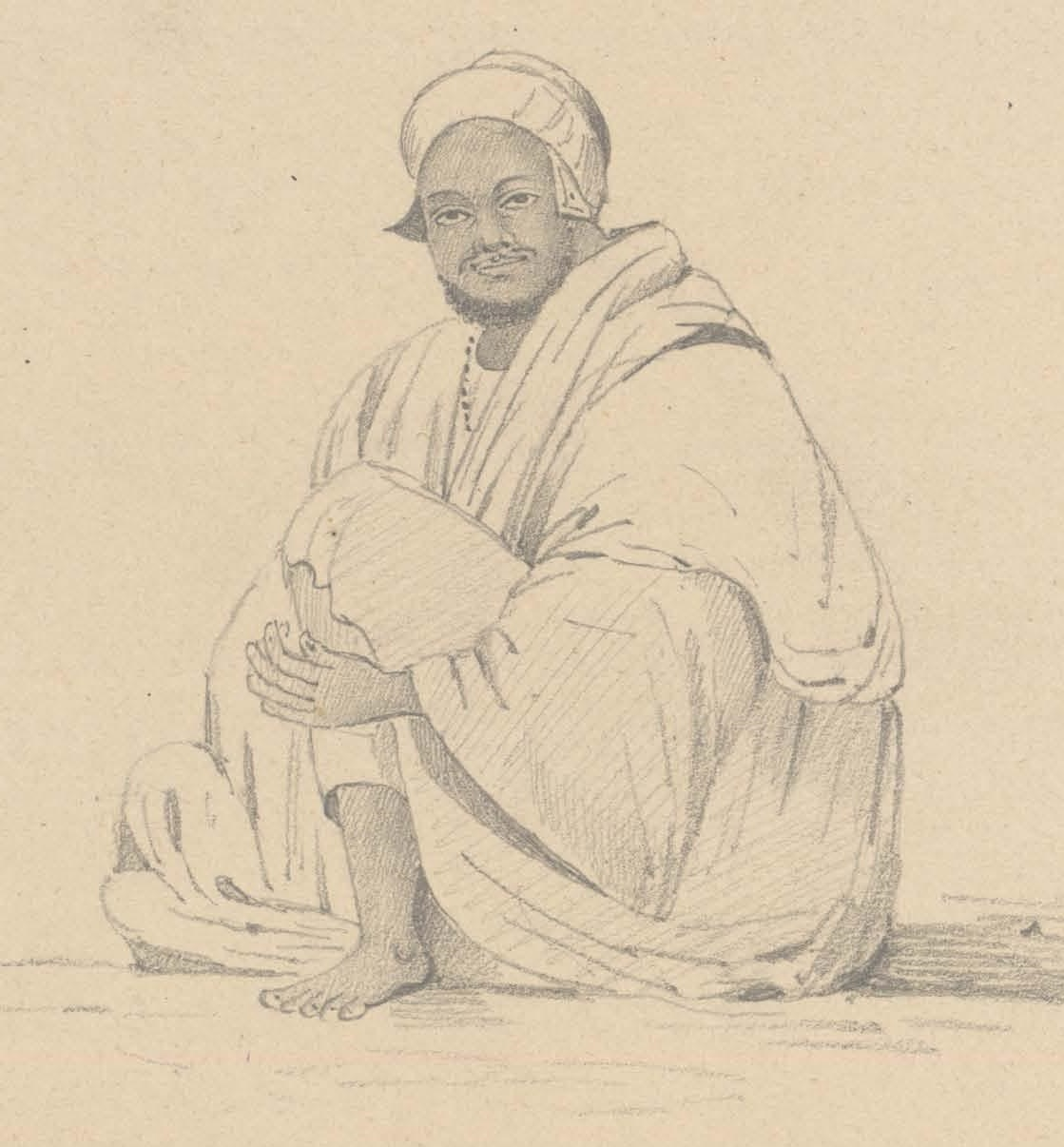
Drawing of Mek Nimr by Linant de Bellefonds, c. 1821

As a result, unrest broke out and there were sporadic attacks on Egyptian troops. To deal with the situation, Ismail was obliged to remove from Sennar and go back downstream first to Wad Madani and then, in October or November 1822, to Shendi. Ismail landed at Shendi and demanded that Mek Nimr of the Ja'alin provide him with 15,000 dollars and 6,000 slaves within three days. When Nimr protested that this was impossible, Ismail struck him across the face with his riding switch (or, according to some accounts, his long Ottoman pipe). Other Ja'ali leaders intervened to defuse the confrontation, but, unwisely, Ismail then spent the night in a house on the opposite side of the Nile to his forces. The Ja'alin pinned his forces down in a night attack on one side of the river, while the house Ismail was sleeping in was set on fire on the other. As the building burned, Ismail and his entourage were cut to pieces.

As news of the revolt in Shendi spread, Egyptian garrisons in Karari, Halfaya, Khartoum, Al-Aylafun and Al-Kamlin had to be evacuated and retreated to general quarters at Wad Madani. Much of the newly conquered territories remained loyal to Egypt however; Dongola and Nubia were secure, as was Berber, held by Mahu Bey, while the Shayqiyya also remained loyal. The revolt was confined primarily to the Ja'alin under Mek Nimr and to some elements in Sennar under the Arbab Dafa'Allah and the Hamaj regent Hasan wad Rajab. Muhammad Said led a force of Shayqiyya south of Sennar and defeated Hasan and Dafa'Allah at Abu Shawka.

== Suppression of the revolt ==
According to the Funj Chronicle, the Defterdar Bey gathered his troops and marched east from Kordofan to Sennar upon hearing of Ismail's death. He learned that while Mek Nimr was blockading Mahu Bey in Berber, his sons and other rebels were gathered at Metemma. They negotiated an amnesty with him, but when a tribesman then tried to murder him, he was roused to a great fury and took bloody vengeance. He then marched north to relieve Berber, and when the Ja'alin advanced to meet him, defeated them, lifting the siege of Berber and allowing Mahu Bey to march out and meet him at Ad-Damir. The Defterdar Bey proceed to lay waste to town after town in the Jazirah, sparing nobody. He marched back and forth from one place to another for months, quelling dissent, killing rebels, and establishing a reputation for brutality which was long remembered. In all some 30,000 people were killed as he restored order. Mek Nimr, however, managed to escape.

These punitive campaigns in the Jezirah marked the final establishment of Egyptian rule in central Sudan. In 1824, his work done, the Defterdar Bey was replaced by Osman Bey Jarkas al-Birinji as supreme commander in Sudan, and he returned to Cairo. Osman Bey brought with him the first contingent of soldiers captured in Sudan and trained in modern military discipline in Egypt, known as the jihadiyya, with whom he maintained strict order in the country. Osman Bey himself died in 1825.

== Slaves in Egypt ==
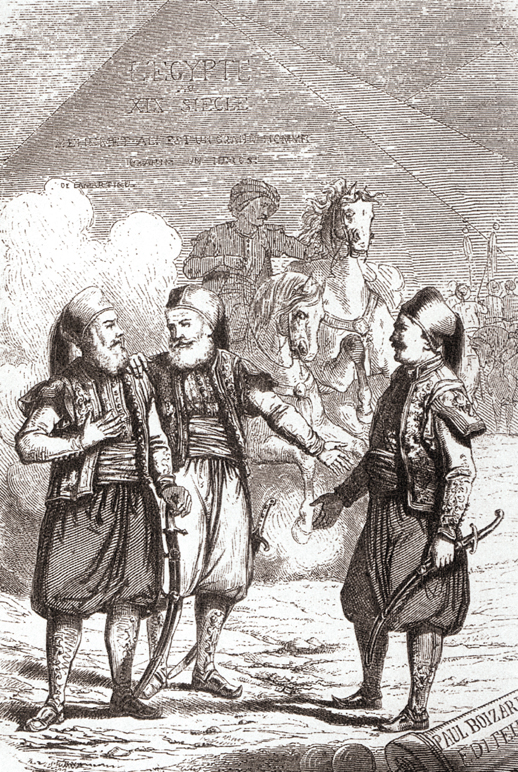
Muhammad Ali of Egypt with his son Ibrahim Pasha and Colonel Sève

Egyptian slavers began raiding the area of southern Sudan,attempting to build up an army of southern Sudanese slaves with the aid of the Muslim Nubian Slavers from the North. To prepare for the training of his slave army, Muhammad Ali sent a corps of Mamluks to Aswan where, in 1820, he had new barracks built to house them. The head of the military academy at Aswan was a French officer who had served under Napoleon, Colonel Octave-Joseph Anthelme Sève, who became a Muslim and is known in Egyptian history as Sulayman Pasha al-Faransawi. When they arrived in Aswan, each of the Sudanese was vaccinated and given a calico vest, then instructed in Islam. The exact numbers of Sudanese brought to Aswan and Muhammad Ali's other military training centre at Manfalut is not known, but it is certain that a great number died en route. Of those who arrived, many died of fevers, chills and the dryness of the climate. Of an estimated 30,000 Sudanese brought to Aswan in 1822 and 1823, only 3,000 survived.

After 1823, Muhammad Ali's priority was to reduce the cost of garrisoning Sudan, where 10,000 Egyptian infantry and 9,000 cavalry were committed. The Egyptians made increasing use of enslaved Sudanese soldiers to maintain their rule, and relied very heavily on them. A more or less official ratio was established, requiring that Sudan provide 3,000 slaves for every 1,000 soldiers sent to subjugate it. This ratio could not be achieved however because the death rate of slaves delivered to Aswan was so high. Muhammad Ali's Turkish and Albanian troops that partook in the Sudan campaign were not used to weather conditions of the area and attained fevers and dysentery while there with tensions emerging and demands to return to Egypt. In addition the difficulties of capturing and raising an army from Sudanese male slaves during the campaign were reasons that led Muhammad Ali towards eventually recruiting local Egyptians for his armed forces.

Despite the overall failure to create slave armies in Egypt at any great scale, the use of Sudanese in agriculture did become fairly common under Muhammad Ali and his successors. Agricultural slavery was virtually unknown in Egypt at this time, but the rapid expansion of extensive farming under Muhammad Ali and later, the global surge in the price of cotton caused by the American Civil War, were factors creating conditions favourable to the deployment of slave labour. The slaves worked primarily on estates owned by Muhammad Ali and members of his family, and it was estimated in 1869, that Khedive Isma'il and his family had 2,000 to 3,000 slaves on their main estates as well as hundreds more in their sugar plantations in Upper Egypt.

== Consolidation ==
A number of territories in modern Sudan and South Sudan were not conquered in the conquest of 1822–24, but were added following campaigns in later years. These included the Kassala region in 1840, the Upper White Nile region around Fashoda in 1855, Suakin and the Red Sea coast in 1865, Equatoria in 1870, and Darfur in 1874.
