= Mahu Bey Urfali =

Ottoman-Egyptian governor of Sudan from 1825 to 1826

- محو بك أورفلي

Wāli of Sudan
- In office May 1825 – March 1826
- Preceded by: Osman Bey Jarkas
- Succeeded by: Ali Khurshid Agha

Personal details
- Born: Urfa, Ottoman Empire
- Died: 1826; Khartoum, Egyptian Sudan, Egypt Eyalet
- Occupation: Commander

Military service
- Allegiance: Egypt Eyalet
- Commands: Commander of Egyptian forces in Sudan for Mahammad Ali of Egypt
- Battles/wars: Egyptian conquest of Sudan (1820–1824)

Mahu Bey Urfali (Egyptian Arabic: محو أورفلي بك; died 1826) was an Egyptian military officer of Kurdish origin who participated in the Egyptian conquest of Sudan in 1820 and administered parts of the territory beginning in 1822. He served as the province governor of Berber, located north of the junction of the Nile and Atbara Rivers, from 1822 to 1825. In 1825 he was appointed acting commander of the Egyptian Army in the Sudan, and was sent to the junction of the Blue and White Nile at the emerging capital in Khartoum. He ruled for less than a year because he died from smallpox in 1826. His Arabic laqab, or toponymic nickname, "Urfali", suggests that he came from Urfa in what is now southeastern Turkey.

== Career in Sudan ==
Mahu Bey was among the officers who joined Isma'il Kamil Pasha, the son of Mahammad Ali Pasha (Ottoman governor of Egypt), for the invasion and conquest of the Sudan in 1820. This Egyptian conquest (as historians of Sudan call the event) led to the overthrow of the remnants of the Funj Sultanate in Sudan and the suppression of resistance from local Arab tribes through military assault. As a Kurdish-Egyptian serving the Mahammad Ali regime, Mahu Bey belonged to an army that included men from diverse parts of northern Africa, southeastern Europe, and western Asia, including, for example, areas corresponding to present-day Albania and Georgia (Circassia).

In 1822, Isma'il Kamil Pasha appointed Mahu Bey governor of the garrison at Berber. In his history of Turco-Egyptian rule in the Sudan (1820-1881), the historian Richard Leslie Hill described Mahu Bey as a level-headed administrator and a "tower of strength" in the province, who balanced Isma'il Pasha's demands for carrying out reprisals against local Sudanese Arab peoples (the Kababish, Hasaniyya, Shukriyya, and Ja'aliyyin) with the need for political and economic stability. Hill wrote that Mahu Bey suppressed a revolt of the Ja'aliyyin and demanded 50,000 dollars (Maria Theresa thalers), but declined to extract the full sum so that the people would not abandon the region and their waterwheels, or saqiyas, meaning their Nile-irrigation-based farms. Mahu Bey resisted demands from Mahammad Ali Pasha himself, writing from Cairo, to crush the local Arab tribes completely, especially after locals killed Mahammad Ali's son Isma'il (leader of the conquest) by burning his hut, with him in it, during the night. During the four decades that followed, other regional governors, who were less stability-minded than Mahu Bey, made heavy demands for taxes and indemnities; these demands led to mounting popular discontentment and contributed eventually to the Mahdist Revolution.

In 1825, a Circassian officer named Uthman Jarkas al-Biringi became commander-in-chief of the Turco-Egyptian troops and established a camp at the junction of the Blue and White Niles, which became the new capital at Khartoum a few years later and ultimately replaced the older Funj capital at Sennar. When Birinji died the next year, Mahu Bey replaced him. Hill described Mahu Bey as a man with "common sense" and a major improvement over Birinji, who had been a "brutal" tax-collector who had killed refugees in punitive patrols and who had executed tribal leaders by blowing their bodies out of cannons. Mahu Bey, Hill added, was also unusual relative to his military comrades in having been a pious Muslim who observed the fast of Ramadan. However, Mahu Bey but ruled for less than a year until his death from smallpox – a disease that was endemic to the region, even though local methods of vaccination were already known and practiced, as when people tied rags that had been rubbed against smallpox pustules onto uninfected people.

According to the anthropologist Talal Asad, records of Mahu Bey's skirmishes with local Arab tribes during his tenure as governor of Berber provided some of the first evidence for the Kababish in historical records in the nineteenth century. French travelers including Linant de Bellefonds and Frédéric Cailliaud also noted Mahu Bey's reprisals against these communities.
