= Mihera Bint Abboud =

Sudanese female poet (1780–1840)

Mihera Bint Abboud (Arabic: مهيرة بت عبود; 1780 – 1840) was a 19th-century Sudanese female poet and warrior, celebrated as a heroine for her attitude of resistance to the Turco-Egyptian invasion of Sudan.

== Early life and lineage ==
Mihera is from the town of Owsley, where she was born around 1780 and grew up there to Izzirq, son of Zarqan, son of Ahmad (Arnabay), son of Hamid (Abu Zlayt), son of Ali (Abu Jabbah), son of Surur, son of Ali, son of Wasif (Sarar), son of Suwar, son of Shaik, son of Hameidan Al-Abbasi. Her lineage traces back to Al-Sharif Abbas ibn Abdul-Muttalib, the uncle of the Prophet Muhammad.

Mihera Bint Abboud was the daughter of the leader of the Shaigiya people in Northern Sudan.They belong to the Al-Aboudab Al-Zalaydab Al-Sourab Al-Shaygi Al-Abbasi family. The family from which Mihera descends is known for its qualities of knowledge, warriors, generosity, and leadership. Her husband was Dawana bin Hatira bin Barhah Al-Awni Al-Shayqi. Mihera Bint Abboud is the sister of the maternal grandmother of former Sudanese president Ibrahim Abboud, who ruled Sudan from 1958 to 1964.

== Role in the resistance ==
Mihera played a significant role in inspiring youth to fight against the Turkish leader Isma'il Pasha of Egypt through her poetry. In a time when women led wars, the most beautiful girls of the tribe would dress in full regalia, riding camels while singing patriotic and motivating songs. Some of these women even engaged in combat and rode horses to face the enemy.

There are some accounts that suggest historians and writers may have confused Mihera Bint Abboud with Princess Safiya bint Sabir, the daughter of King Sabir of the Shayqiya tribe. As Abdalla Elsheikh Sid Ahmed pointed out in his recently published book titled Mihera Bint Abboud: The Magnificent Honor (1780–1840), Mihera Bint Abboud was a married woman with children, and possibly grandchildren, when she participated in the Battle of Korti. At that time, she was in her forties.

Mihera played a crucial role in motivating Sudanese people against the colonizers during the Battle of Kurti, which took place on November 4, 1820, when Isma'il Pasha of Egypt entered the areas of the Shayqiya tribe, demanding that they hand over their weapons, while he possessed firearms. When there was a division of opinion between those supporting war and those calling for surrender, Mihera Bint Abboud urged the youth to quickly defend their land.

According to historian Naoum Shouchair, in his book Geography and History of Sudan, when Mihera saw the army of Ismail Pasha, she mounted her horse and shouted to her people, "Let’s go defend our country's independence!" She then spurred her horse towards the occupying soldiers, prompting the Shayqi to rally behind her, fighting with the courage. After her performance had roused the men to battle, Mihera composed this verse to celebrate their courage:

Today our men all on their horses
In front of them their commander
On his beautiful horse struts.
Our men are like lions when they roar
Oh, fool Pasha, just let your chickens go away.

Shaigiya swords and lances were no match for Egyptian firearms, and the Egyptian troops continued their conquest of the Sudan.

However, as a heroine from Sudanese history, the example of Mihera Bint Abboud has been an inspiration to women participating in anti-colonial politics in the Sudan, as well as in the 2019–2020 Sudanese protests.

== See also ==
- History of Turkish Sudan
