= Musa Pasha =

Musa Pasha may refer to:

- Kara Musa Pasha (died 1649), Ottoman Kapudan Pasha (grand admiral) and grand vizier
- Musa Pasha ibn Hasan Ridwan (fl. 1663–1670), Ottoman governor of Gaza and Jerusalem
- Mūsā Pasha Ḥamdī (died 1865), Governor-General of the Sudan

== See also ==
- Musa (name)
- Pasha
