= Muhammad Bey (defterdar) =

Mahammad Bey al-Daftardar

Hakimdar of Sudan
- Reign: April 1821 – September 1824
- Predecessor: Isma'il Kamil Pasha
- Successor: Osman Bey Jarkas
- Died: 1824
- Spouse: Nazli
- House: Mahammad Ali (by marriage)
- Religion: Islam

Mahammad Khusraw Bey al-defterdar (Egyptian Arabic: محمد خسرو بك الدفتردار; died 1824) was a defterdar and husband of Nazli, the second eldest daughter of Mahammad Ali Pasha. Mahammad Bey was one of Mahammad Ali's trustworthy assistants.

== Career ==
At first, he was appointed defterdar, and was distinguished by magnanimity, courage and intelligence.

At the beginning of the month of Safar in the year 1232 AH / 1816 CE, the teacher Ghali attended from the tribal side, with correspondence from Mahammad Bey, who took over the command of Upper Egypt instead of Ibrahim Pasha, who went to the Hejaz to fight Wahhabism in which he mentions the advice of the teacher Ghali and his endeavor to open the doors of collecting money to the treasury, and that he invented something and accounts from which many amounts of money were obtained, and he was met with satisfaction and honor, and he took the pasha and assigned him and made him a clerk of his secret (secret keeper), and he was required to serve him, and he took what he was assigned to and attended for him, which includes the accounts of all the notebooks and pens of innovators and their directors and regional rulers.

On the first Rabi' al-Awwal 1235 AH / 1819 CE, the Pasha dismissed Mahammad Bey al-Daftardar from the command of Upper Egypt and imitated Ahmed Pasha Ibn Taher Pasha in his place and traveled on the fifth of Rabi' al-Awwal. On the seventh of Rabi' al-Awwal, the pasha traveled to Alexandria to inspect the canal, and accompanied him, his son Ibrahim Pasha, Mahammad Bey al-defterdar, the old Katkhuda, and Dabus Oghley.

== Conquest of Sudan ==
Mahammad Ali Pasha entrusted his son-in-law, Mahammad Bey al-defterdar, the conquest of Kordofan, and that region belonged to the Sultan of Darfur, so while Isma'il Kamil Pasha was crawling on Sennar, the army of al-Defterdar marched to its destination on the road to Dongola and Abu Qas, and the journey to Kordofan was deadly arduous for the soldiers because they walked seven consecutive days cutting the distance in a desert that has no water and no planting.

The defterdar met the army of the deputy of Sultan Muhammad al-Fadl, the Sultan of Darfur, and the two teams clashed in a bloody incident in the town of Bara, north of El Obeid (April 1821), which ended with the victory of the al-Defertdar army and the occupation of El Obeid, the capital of Kordofan.

The Battle of Bara was the most intense battle the Turkish army fought in the first conquest, in which the Kordofan army showed great courage, but the Egyptian army's cannons overpowered them. After the battle, the Sultan of Darfur tried to take Kordofan back and raided it, but he returned disappointed.

=== Revenge for the death of Ismail ===
Ismail stayed for a while in Sennar managing the matter of the government he founded, then he sent groups of Sudanese prisoners, accompanied by groups of soldiers to Aswan, to be recruited into the regular Egyptian army that Mahammad Ali was serious in establishing, and he also prepared to return to Egypt up in the Nile.

In the meantime, it was learned that the people of El-Halfaya and Shendi and their surroundings revolted against the Egyptian authority, and the disadvantages of the soldiers, especially the Arnauts, were among the reasons for the people's rampage and revolt. The revolutionaries gathered around El-Halfaya and Shendi and attacked the convoys of Sudanese slaves and snatched them from the hands of the soldiers assigned to them, and they returned to Shendi happy with this victory.

Isma'il Pasha learned of this news, so he immediately went to Shendi with the rest of the army. Mek Nimr, Ja'ali King of Shendi, was the mastermind of this revolution. Ismail suddenly came to the city in late October of 1822, and ordered the King of Shendi to be brought before him. When he appeared before him, he began to knock him and reprimand him excessively. Then he went so far as to slap him in the face. The king did not respond to this extreme insult, but he kept it within himself and determined to wash it away with abject revenge.

As for Isma'il Pasha, he pardoned him in return for a heavy financial fine that he would pay in five days and a thousand of slaves, and Mek Nimr showed submission and accepted the fine, then he invited Ismail Pasha and his entourage to a feast in his palace in Shendi, and his palace was made from straw. The king welcomed them with a great welcome, and ordered his assistants to gather what they could of wood, straw and hay around the palace under the pretext of fodder for the pasha's horses.

The guests did not realize that a terrible conspiracy was being hatched against them. When they finished eating and drank a lot of Merisa, they began to prepare to return to their camp. Suddenly, the fire spread through the piles of firewood and straw surrounding the palace, and then it spread and broke out around it, turning the palace into a flame of hell. The fire surrounded Ismail Pasha and his entourage, and they were unable to escape this infernal siege of the horror of the working fire and the king’s soldiers surrounding them, throwing arrows and arrows at them from every direction.

The paths were blocked in their faces until they died to the last of them, and the soldiers were unable to help them as they were in their camp far from the place of the tragedy, and when the disaster occurred, King Nimr’s men attacked them and killed them, and none of them survived except those who escaped with their lives.

This calamity was a major catastrophe that had a bad impact on the center of the Egyptian army and undermined its prestige. The killing of the army commander in this infernal manner would send despair and terror into the souls of the soldiers.

When the news reached Mahammad Ali Pasha, he was deeply saddened by the killing of his son Ismail, especially after he lost his son Tusun Pasha a few years ago. However, he received the misfortune with patience and decided to continue on his path.

Mahammad Bey al-Daftardar was in Kordofan at the time of this disaster, and when news of it came to him, he immediately marched on Shendi to take revenge and torture those who participated in the incident. Shendi was ruined, and he went to extremes in abuse and cruelty, making him an example of his penchant for murder and bloodshed. He killed thousands of women to avenge his son-in-law, and took captive thousands more of boys and women, sending them to Cairo. He pursued King Nimr, but did not catch him as he fled to the borders of Abyssinia.

He completed the conquest of Sudan at the head of three thousand soldiers, and while he was carrying out the disciplinary campaign there, he was drawing a map of the areas through which he passed. This map was admired by everyone for its accuracy, and he was subsequently elected as a member of the Geographical Society in Paris. He died in 1824.
