= Badi VII =

Final ruler of the Funj Sultanate from 1805 to 1821

Badi VII (reigned 1805–1821) was the last ruler of the Funj Sultanate.

Badi offered no resistance to Ismail Pasha, who had led the khedive army of his father up the Nile to his capital at Sennar. Alan Moorhead repeats Frédéric Cailliaud's impression of Badi, that the king was an extremely limited little man who was stunned by the loss of his kingdom, taking particular note that Badi "was intrigued by Cailliaud's gift of a box of matches."

According to Moorhead, even had the king wanted to resist, he had few resources to do so. There was no sign of the famous cavalry of Black Horses which had impressed James Bruce forty years before, and his armament consisted of four rusty cannons which were "flung into the Blue Nile to appease the Turks." Of the town itself, the palace and mosque "the only two buildings of any consequence in Sennar, were tumbling down, and the inhabitants no more steadfast; Cailliaud singled out the women of the town, "who were much given to smoking and beer-drinking."

Badi emerged from the town "to surrender and offer gifts of horses and their trappings to the conquerors. Ismail had served coffee, had presented Badi with a somewhat unsuitable fur-lined cloak, and on June 14 had led his rabble in the town, where they began their usual lootings and reprisals, including one particularly horrible impalement."

Badi was reinstated as the nominal ruler of this province, but Moorhead aptly quotes Crawford's words that "the long-drawn-out death agony of the Kingdom of Sennar was finished."

== Notes ==
Preceded by Agban	King of Sennar	Succeeded by none
