= Isma'il Kamil Pasha =

Wāli of Sudan (1820–1821)

Isma'il Kamil
- Pasha

Wāli of Sudan
- Reign: 21 November 1820 – 1821
- Predecessor: Position established
- Successor: Muhammad Bey al-Daftardar
- Born: 1795; Ottoman Empire
- Died: 1822 (aged 26–27); Shendi, Egyptian Sudan, Egypt Eyalet
- Burial: Hosh al-Basha, Cairo, Egypt Eyalet, now (Egypt)
- Dynasty: Muhammad Ali dynasty
- Father: Muhammad Ali of Egypt
- Religion: Sunni Islam
- Conflicts: Egyptian conquest of Sudan

Isma'il Kamil Pasha (Egyptian Arabic: إسماعيل كامل باشا, romanized: Ismā‘īl Kamil Bāshā; 1795 – 1822) was the third son of Muhammad Ali Pasha of Egypt, and the leader of the campaign he sent in 1820, to annex Sudan. He was burned to death in a plot prepared for him by Mek Nimr, the Ja'ali King of Shendi, in 1822, in response to an insult directed at him by Ismail, rebuking him for the people of Shendi revolting and attacking slave convoys heading to Egypt.

== Biography ==
Ismail Kamil was the leader of the Sudan campaign of 1820, while Mahammad Bey al-Daftardar was tasked with the conquest of Kordofan. Ismail succeeded in conquering Dongola and subjugated Mek Nimr, King of Shendi, in March 1821. But Nimr quickly rebelled and defected, so Ismail set off against him with an army and entered the capital of the city of Shendi in October 1822. He blamed its king, Nimr, and even slapped him in the face. King Nimr decided to take revenge, so he invited Prince Ismail and the leaders of his forces to a feast in his wooden palace, and gathered around him quantities of hay and dry grass. Ismail was surprised, the king replied that this was the food for the prince's horses and the army leaders, and as soon as everyone settled inside the royal palace, it was completely set on fire. He ordered his soldiers to fire arrows and arrows at everyone in it, and Ismail was killed and burned when he was 27 years old.

When Mahammad Bey al-Daftardar learned of this, he set out with his forces from Kordofan to Shendi to take revenge on Mek Nimr, who had fled and taken refuge in the lands of Abyssinia (Ethiopian Empire). Its emperor received him and appointed him ruler of a region inside Abyssinia until he died.

Al-Defterdar collected the remains of Ismail's body and carried it to Cairo, where his father, Mahammad Ali, buried him in Hosh al-Basha, with his name recorded on the tombstone in Turkish.
