= Shendi University =

Public university in Shendi, Sudan

- جامعة شندي
- Type: Public
- Established: 1994; 32 years ago
- Location: Shendi, Sudan; 16.7001°N 33.4293°E
- Website: www.ush.sd/en

Shendi University is a public university that was established in 1994, located in Shendi, Sudan. It is a member of the Federation of the Universities of the Islamic World.

== See also ==
- Education in Sudan
