= Mūsā Pasha Ḥamdī =

Turco-Egyptian soldier and politician (c. 1810–1865)

Mūsā Pasha Ḥamdī (Turkish: Musa Paşa Hamdi; c. 1810–1865) was a Turco-Egyptian soldier and politician. He rose to the rank of mīrlivā (major general) in the Egyptian Army and served as the Governor-General of the Sudan from 1862 until his death. He was a man of forceful character and some wealth, owning lands in Fayyūm.

== Biography ==
A Circassian by origin, Mūsā entered the Egyptian Army at a time when Egypt was an autonomous province of the Ottoman Empire. He was a low-ranking officer when he took part in the fighting around Gallabat during the Egyptian invasion of Ethiopia in 1837. He was first adjutant to the Governor-General Aḥmad Pasha Manliklī during the war against the Beja in 1844. He earned a reputation for cruelty during this campaign. He then led an expedition against Nāṣir ibn Abbukr, the makk of Taqali, in the Nuba Hills before he was appointed governor of Kordofan.

In 1851 Mūsā was appointed deputy governor-general of the Sudan and led a military expedition against the Ḥalanqa and the Shukrīya people of the Buṭāna. Afterwards, he returned to Egypt and was appointed governor of Girga, in which capacity he accompanied the wāli Muḥammad Saʿīd Pasha on his visit to Sudan in 1856–57. In 1857 Saʿīd abolished the governorate-general as part of a policy of decentralization, but in 1862 he reversed policy and appointed Mūsā to the re-established post.

Before he was confirmed in office, Mūsā had Muḥammad Rāsikh Bey removed from his governorship and the province divided into two, based on Khartoum and Sennar. One of his first acts as governor-general was to lead a reconnaissance-in-force to the border with Ethiopia, which was plagued by incessant cross-border slave raiding. He wintered at Dunkur in 1862–63 while he dispatched forces to raid Wehni and Welkait and to burn Mai Qubba on the Tekezé, where some Jaʿlīyīn refugees under the son of Makk Nimr were staying.

Mūsā introduced the carriage to Khartoum. He rode behind runners in the fashion of the ruler of Egypt. He was one of the few Sudanese governors to attain the honorary rank of Rumeli beylerbeysi. He died in Khartoum of smallpox and was buried in a qubba (domed tomb) on ʿAbbās Avenue.

== Legacy ==
Assessments of his character are generally negative. His methods of tax collection made him unpopular locally, and his successor as governor-general, Jaʿfar Pasha Ṣādiq, considered him corrupt and a drunkard. The French explorer Guillaume Lejean lambasted him as a hangman and slaver, especially towards the Baqqāra, and the British consul in Khartoum, John Petherick, agreed that he was excessively cruel. The German explorer Theodor von Heuglin, however, praised his friendly disposition towards Europeans.
