= Makk =

Historical Sudanese honorific title

Makk (plural mukūk), also spelled mak, mek or meek, is a title formerly used in the Sudan, meaning "ruler" or "king". There are three theories of its origins. It may be a corruption of the Arabic word malik (pl. mulūk), meaning "king"; it may descend from Meroitic mk, meaning "God", appropriate to the divine kingship practised in the Sudan; or, as E. A. Wallis Budge proposed, it may be derived from Ge'ez መከሐ (mkḥ), meaning "to be glorious", making it an Ethiopian import. The territory ruled by a makk may be called a "makkdom" or "mekdom" in English.

The title makk was used for the ruler of the Funj Sultanate and for all his vassal rulers in the region of Sennar. It was used by the ruler of Taqali, whose tributaries were also known as mukūk al-ʿāda (sing. makk al-ʿāda), "customary kings". The ruler of Shendi also bore the title, and Shendi's last ruler, Mek Nimr, resisted the Egyptian conquest of Sudan in 1821–22.

During the period of the Anglo-Egyptian condominium in the Sudan, the government used indirect rule, appointing and deposing many mukūk. Following the deposition in 1903 of the makk of the Shilluks for misappropriation of funds and other abuses, the new makk was forced to accept "eleven conditions of mekship". Among the Nuba, the government made the "mek-in-council" (akin to the king-in-council), along with tribal hierarchies and federations, the basis of indirect rule.
