= Fazogli =

Historical province in the border region between Sudan and Ethiopia

Coordinates: 11°17′N 34°46′E

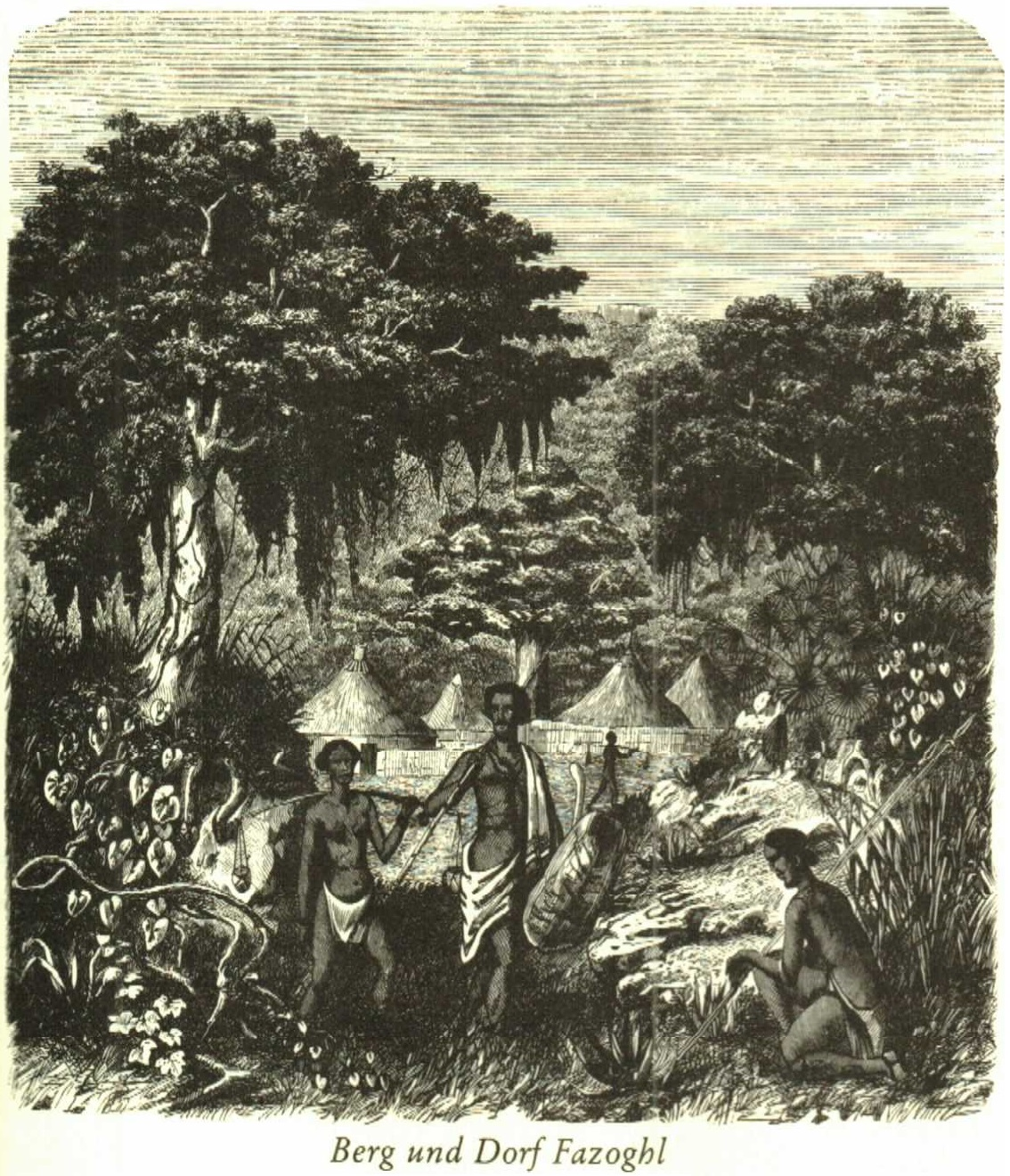
Village in Fazughli, c. 1850

Fazogli (Arabic: فازوغلي), also known as Fazughli, Fazoghl or Fazokl, was a historical province in what is now the border region between Sudan and Ethiopia. It was established by the Funj after their conquest of the kingdom of Fazughli in 1685 and was continued in Turco-Egyptian Sudan and Anglo-Egyptian Sudan. It lay between the Blue Nile and the Sobat River, and included the mountains in the modern Asosa Zone of the Ethiopian Benishangul-Gumuz Region. The west slope of the hills drains the White Nile.

The area was believed to be rich in gold deposits, which led an Egyptian military expedition under the leadership of Ismail bin Muhammad Ali, son of Wali Muhammad Ali into the area (1820–1823) in part determine the truth of this belief, as well as to capture some 30,000 inhabitants to be slaves. He was accompanied by Frédéric Cailliaud, George Waddington, and George Bethune English, all of whom later wrote accounts of the expedition. Pasha Mohammad Ali later organized Fazogli into a number of sheikhdoms to govern its inhabitants. Later geologists who surveyed the area for gold included Josef von Russegger.

== See also ==
- Kingdom of Fazughli
