= Mek Nimr =

Sudanese tribal king during the mid-1800s

Nimr Muhammad
- Mek ("king") of Shendi
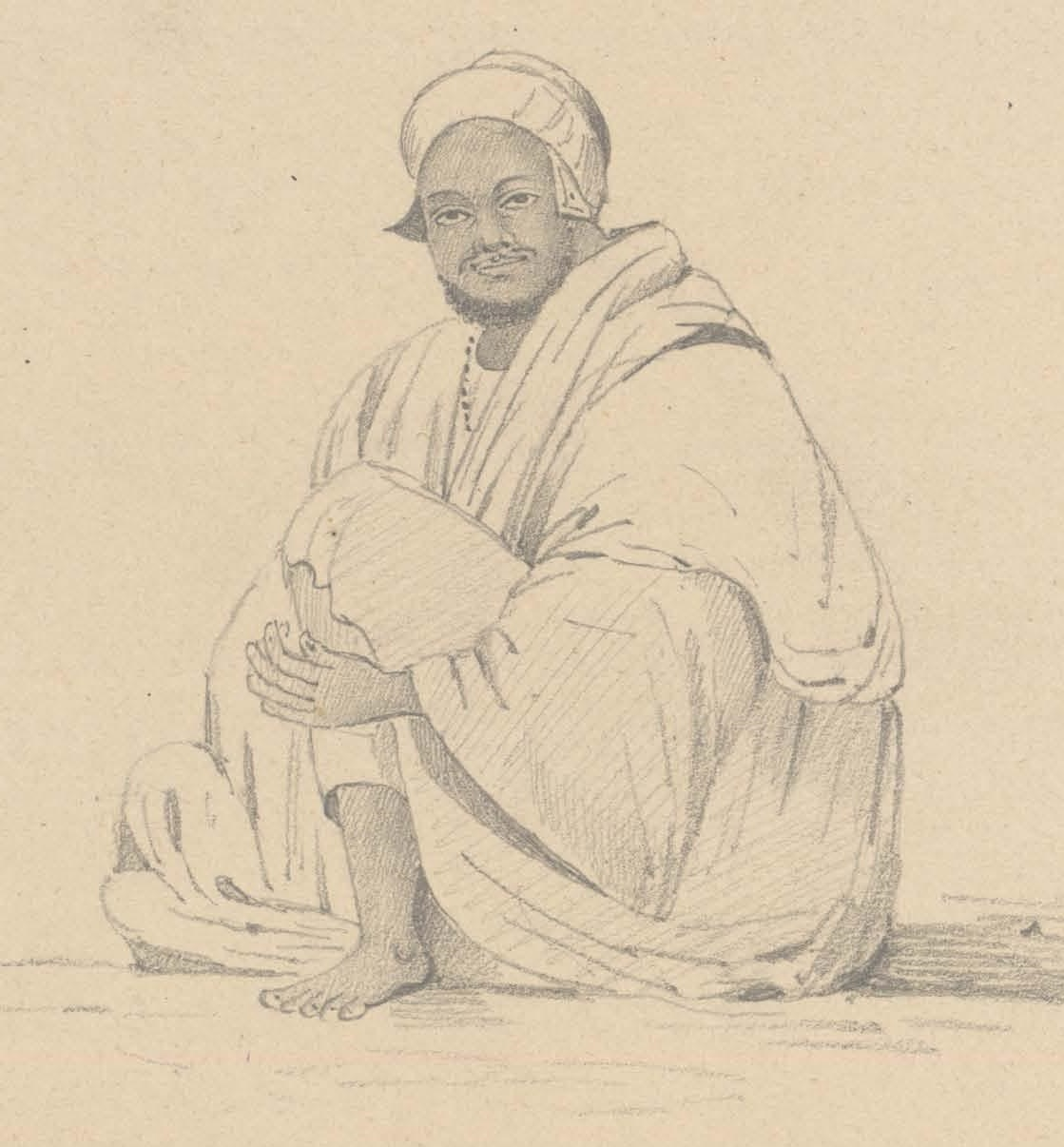
- Drawing of Mek Nimr by Linant de Bellefonds, c. 1821

1801/1802–1821
- Successor: Umara wad Nimr Muhammad
- Born: c. 1785
- Died: 1846; Mai Qubba at Bahr al-Salam
- Issue: Shamma
- Dynasty: Nimrab
- Father: Muhammad wad Nimr Abd al-Salaam

El Mek Nimr, also known as Nimr Muhammad, (c. 1785 to 1846) was the last mek (king) of the Ja'alin tribe, who resided in Shendi, Sudan. After first having joined the Egyptian army during the Turkish rule in Sudan, he later defeated their troops and finally went into exile.

== Egyptian expedition ==
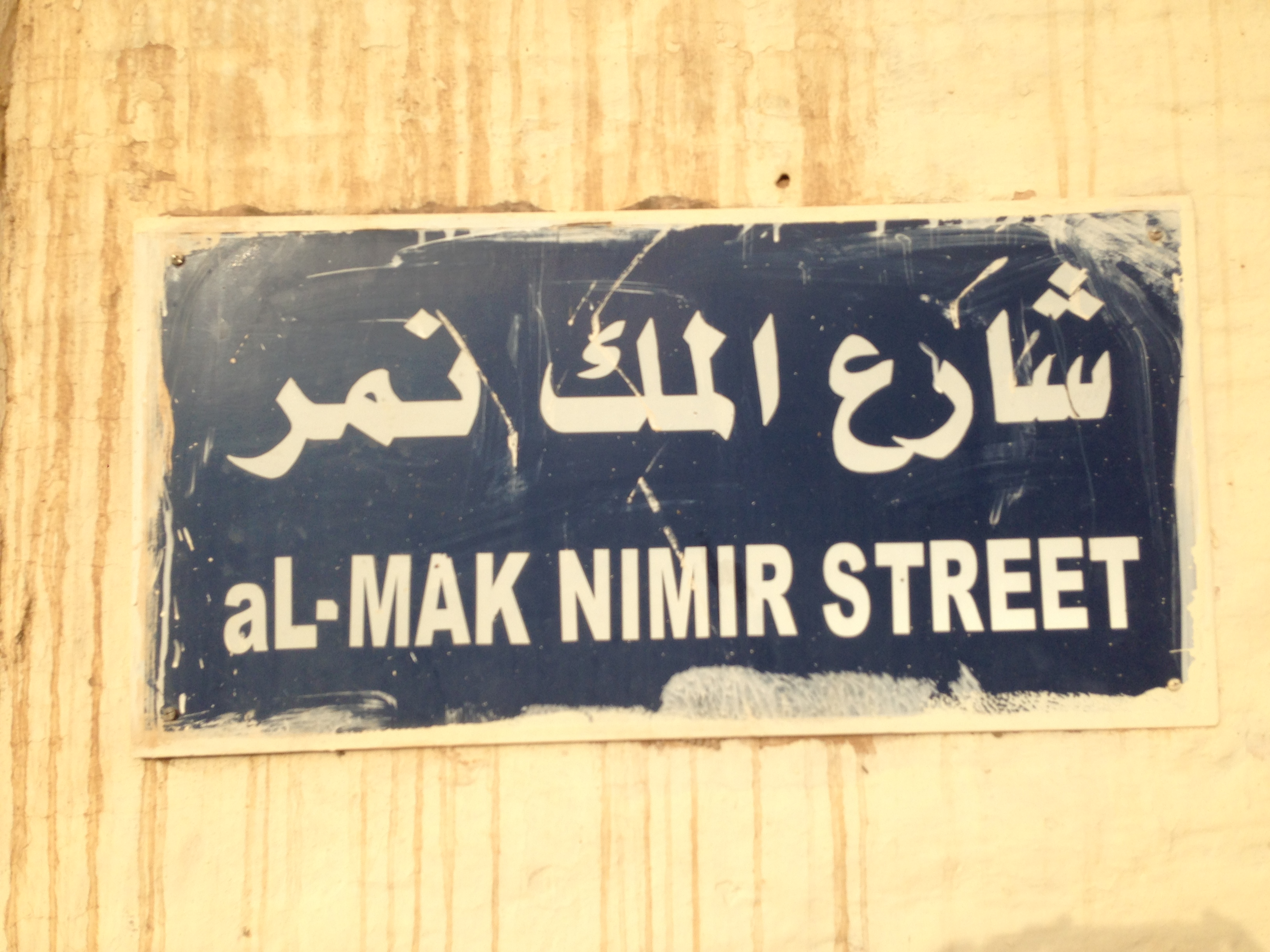
Street sign in central Khartoum (2018)

During the Egyptian invasion of Sudan, Nimr was forced to accept the Egyptian-Turkish rule by submitting to Isma'il Kamil Pasha's army on 28 March 1821. He also joined Isma'il's campaign against the Sennar sultanate.

After this campaign, Isma'il retired to Shendi, but paid the sixty year-old Mek Nimr no courtesy. When he demanded a tribute of slaves and money, Nimr refused. This led to a confrontation, in which Isma'il struck the king. A few hours later, Nimr attacked Isma'il's camp, setting it ablaze and burning Isma'il with it. Nimr also had all Egyptian forces killed and ambushed their cavalry that arrived two days later.

Later, Isma'il's successor, Defterdar Muhammad Bey Khusraw led a revenge campaign on the Ja'alin. Many of them, including Mek Nimr, were forced into exile.

According to Anton von Prokesch-Osten Nimr owned a suit of armour, consisting of mail and a cuirass and featuring a golden inscription that read "I am Nemr, lord of all these tribes. My strength is superior to everyone. Who doubts, shall come." (Note: "Ich bin Nemr, Fürst aller dieser Stämme. Meine Stärke ist Jedem überlegen. Wer zweifelt, komme.")

== Recognition ==
A street in downtown Khartoum is named after him, leading up to El Mek Nimr Bridge since its opening in 2007.

== Sources ==
- Lea, David; Rowe, Annamarie (2001). A Political Chronology of Africa. Taylor & Francis. ISBN 9781857431162.
- McGregor, Andrew James (2006). A Military History of Modern Egypt: From the Ottoman Conquest to the Ramadan War. Greenwood Publishing Group. ISBN 9780275986018.
- Kramer, Robert S.; Lobban, Richard Andrew; Fluehr-Lobban, Carolyn (2013). Historical Dictionary of the Sudan. Rowman & Littlefield. ISBN 9780810861800.
- Prokesch Ritter von Osten, Anton (1831). Das Land zwischen den Katarakten des Nil.
