= Shendi =

City in River Nile State, Sudan

Shendi شندى Shandi
- City
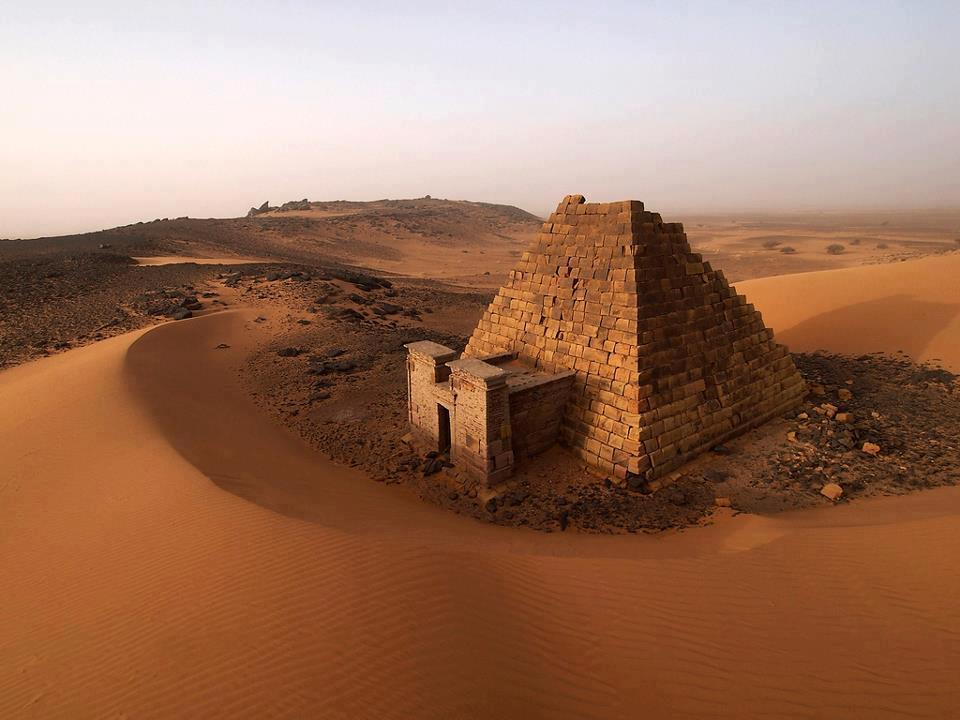
- Pyramids of Meroë, near Shendi

- Location in Sudan
- Coordinates: 16°41′25″N 33°25′51″E
- Country: Sudan
- State: River Nile State
- Elevation: 1,198 ft (365 m)

Population (2007)
  - Total: 55,516
- Time zone: UTC+02:00 (CAT)

Shendi or Shandi (Arabic: شندي) is a small city in northern Sudan, situated on the southeastern bank of the Nile River 150 km northeast of Khartoum. Shandi is also about 45 km southwest of the ancient city of Meroë. Located in the River Nile state, Shandi is the center of the Ja'alin tribe and an important historic trading center. Its principal suburb on the west bank is Matamma. A major traditional trade route across the Bayuda Desert connects Matamma to Merowe and Napata, 250 km to the northwest. The city is the historical capital of the powerful Sudanese Arab Ja'alin tribe whom most of its denizens belong to. The village of Hosh Bannaga, hometown of former President Omar al-Bashir, is located on the outskirts of the city.

== Etymology ==
There are several theories as to the origin of Shendi's name.

One theory holds that the name comes from shandi (or shundi), an old Nubian word for "lip," so named because the town is located in the bend of the Nile River, which is similar to the shape of lips.

Another theory claims that the name came from a word in the Meroitic language meaning "the ram" because the place was a pasture for sheep that were being sanctified in the Kingdom of Kush during the Meroitic period, which is shown by the remains of the statues inside the sheep hall at the entrance Al-Naq’a Palace and the Al-Bajrawiya area.

Similarly, the name for Shendi has also been suggested as derived from "Shndi/ʃn'də" for sheep in Daju vocabulary. The connection is supported by the Daju oral tradition of a former riverine distribution and ancient locality to Shendi before their migrations west into Kordofan and Darfur.

Another theory claims that the name is derived from the Beja language word "Shanda", which means "the long winter".

== History ==
Shendi's location in the middle of several geographical areas and tribal entities along with being at the crossroads of trade routes has led to the city playing a great political and commercial role.

=== Ancient history ===
It is not known exactly when Shendi began to be inhabited, but it is certain that the area currently located between the "Al-Kawthar Hotel" near the Shendi High School in the north of the city and the outskirts of "Shanan Castle" in the south has been inhabited by humans semi-continuously throughout the past four thousand years. This is due to multiple factors; the area being located near the river, the relative height being higher than the lowlands submerged by the seasonal flood waters of the Nile, its suitability for continuous cultivation and the availability of grasses and pastures in it that help graze and domesticate animals.

The archaeological excavation at the site of Shanan Castle revealed a wide spread of Neolithic man activities in the Shendi area, and the quantity and quality of the archaeological artifacts extracted from the site indicate a large settlement that existed in the place, whose inhabitants exploited the natural resources of the area.

=== Medieval period ===
During the medieval period, the city was one of the major markets in Northeast and West Africa, where the caravan routes to the Red Sea, including the caravans of pilgrims, crossed from West Africa, as it was receiving trade convoys coming from southern and central Sudan and the kingdoms of Abyssinia.

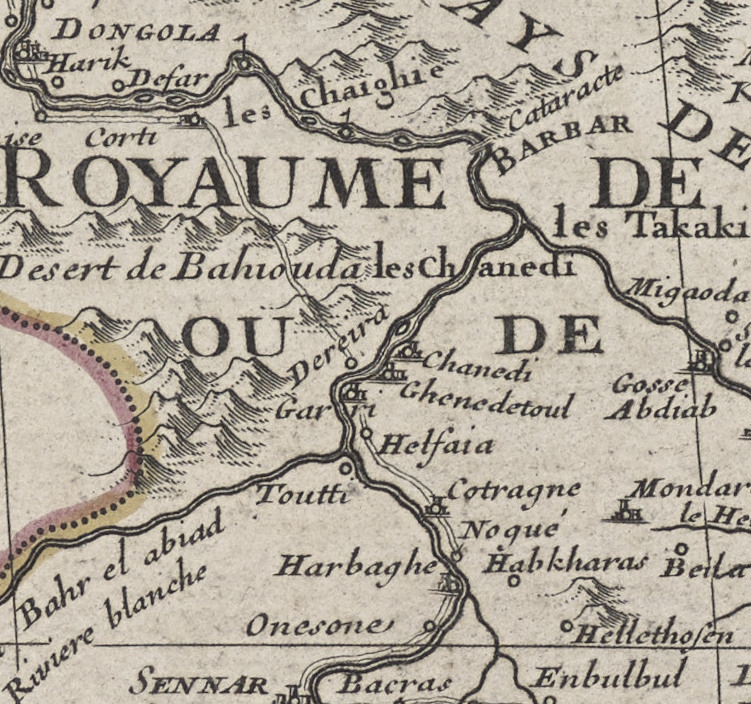
Shendi ("Chanedi") on a map by Guillaume Delisle, 1707

The English traveler James Bruce, in his book Travels to Discover the Source of the Nile, described Shendi, where he stopped for a short period in 1772, on his way back from Abyssinia. He praises Shendi for its market full of goods and merchandise, surrounded by orchards and irrigated fields located on the banks of the Nile River. He mentioned that the weekly market in Shendi is the largest of its kind in Nubia, and is located at the intersection of two land based trade routes, with cattle, horses, gum arabic, tobacco, honey, coffee, sheep and other commodities coming from central and southern Sudan and the western lowlands of Abyssinia via Sinnar and sugar, white cotton and copper yellow coming from Egypt, via Berber. Seasonings and spices from India and glassware and sweets from Europe came via the port of Suakin on the Red Sea Bruce mentioned that a woman named Sitna was ruling Shendi.

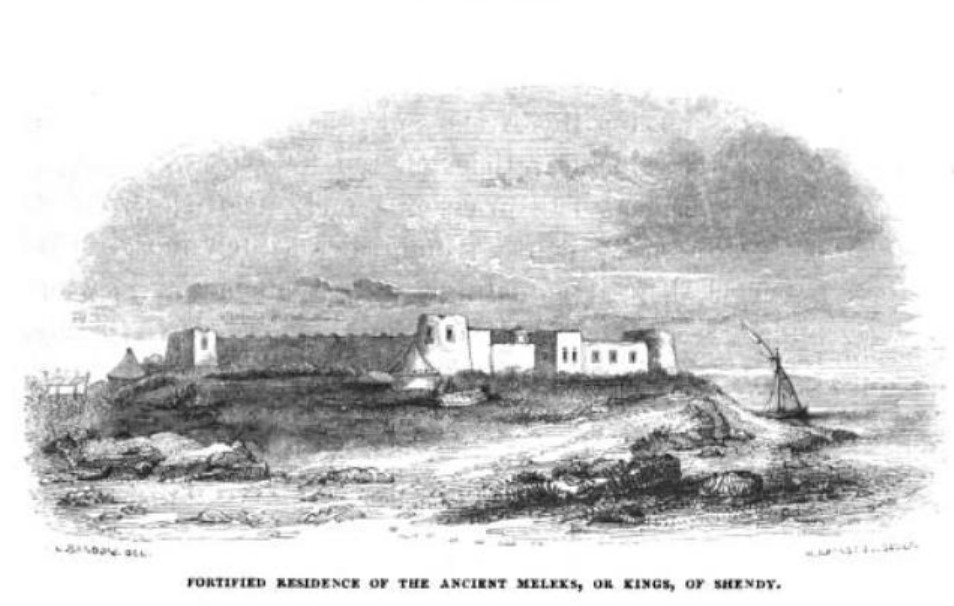
Wood engraving from 1835 depicting the residence of the makk of Shendi

The German traveler and orientalist John Ludwik Burckhardt gave a description of the economic and social conditions in the city when he visited it in the year 1814. On his way to Swaken via Kassala he joined a trade caravan consisting of more than 200 head of camels, 150 merchants accompanied by their families, 300 slaves, and 30 horses that were dedicated to Yemen. To avoid suspicion, he claimed that he was a small merchant who wanted to go to the Upper Nile in search of a cousin of his who disappeared a few years ago, on a trip to the city of Snar. It was decided convoy would begin moving in March 1814. According to him, there was a road heading east towards the lower Atbara River through Quz Rajab. Burckhardt mentions the king of Shendi in his writings and said that his name is al-Mak Muhammad al-Nimr Nayir, the king of the Jaaliyn and his family is a branch of the ruling family of Sennar and is called the Wad Ajeeb family, and his father is from the Jaalieen tribe and his mother is from the Wad Ajeeb family.

The Shendi king, like the Berber rulers, owed allegiance to the ruler of Sennar, and with the exception of the amount of money that he paid to the ruler of Sennar annually and some mutual visits from both sides, the Shendi king enjoyed complete independence from Sennar in the entire territory of his region extending north for a two-day march.

=== The Battle of Ismail Kamel Pasha ===
In 1820, Khedive Muhammad Ali Pasha, the governor of the Ottoman Egypt, decided to invade Sudan to expand the territory of his kingdom and chase the remnants of the Mamluks who had fled Egypt. His forces reached Shendi in November 1822 on his way to Sennar, capital of the Funj Sultanate. Ismail Pasha Kamel entered into negotiations with Mek Nimr, ruler of Shendi. History records that Ismail dealt a severe offense to Al-Mak when he asked him with arrogance to provide him with large numbers of livestock, slaves and female slaves, saying to him: "Like the one standing next to you," and pointing with his finger towards the small daughter of Al-Mak standing next to her father. Nimr attempted to kill the Pasha, but the assistant of the king who was next to him, beckoned to him to wait until the time was right to respond to the insult. Mak Nimr held firm, pretended to acquiesce, and invited the Pasha and his followers to a feast, during which the place of celebration was surrounded by weeds and dry fodder and surrounded by the king's supporters. It was set on fire and the Pasha died in the fire, in some accounts, along with large numbers of his guards and servants, while all those who tried to escape from the flames of fire were killed.

According to Sudanese historian Makki Shabeika, the Pasha had left his cavalry in a place about 20 miles (32 km) south of Shendi and hurried with a number of his entourage, his bodyguard and his doctor to Shendi. Twenty thousand Egyptian pounds, and when Mek Nimr concluded from the enormity of the request and objected to the Pasha slap him in the face with his long pipe, and the king was about to respond to the insult with the sword, but the king assistant winked him with his hand, and in another narration he spoke to him in the dialect of the Basharin and asked him to postpone revenge.

Muhammad Ali Pasha's reaction to the killing of his son was devastating, as he ordered his son-in-law Muhammad Bey Al-Daftardar to return from Kordofan to launch a disciplinary campaign during which the city of Shendi was destroyed and ruined in 1823, and most of its inhabitants were killed. Al-Mak Nimr withdrew from the city to the south towards Sennar and the border of Abyssinia, where he settled and his followers established a city they called Al-Matumma, after Al-Matma in Shendi.

Shendi remained for the rest of the nineteenth century an unknown village to the invaders, and its market shifted north to Khartoum, the capital of the Turkish-Egyptian rule at the time. The city no longer had any economic importance and its agricultural production was no longer sufficient to feed the population of its countryside.

The German traveler Alfred Brim described in his book, Plans of a Journey from Northeast Africa, the city of Matma, located on the left bank of the Nile, as an extension of the New Shendi, and its wealth of gold, silver, and leather tanning.

== Climate ==
Shendi experiences a hot desert climate (Köppen: BWh), characterized by high temperatures and minimal precipitation. Summers are long and scorching, with June recording the highest temperatures, while winters remain very warm. Annual rainfall is meager, amounting to less than 100 millimetres (3.9 in), with sporadic showers concentrated in the late summer months. Humidity levels remain low throughout the year. Shendi has abundant sunshine, with an annual total exceeding 3000 hours.

Climate data for Shendi (1991–2020)
| Month | Jan | Feb | Mar | Apr | May | Jun | Jul | Aug | Sep | Oct | Nov | Dec | Year |
|---|---|---|---|---|---|---|---|---|---|---|---|---|---|
| Record high °C (°F) | 40 (104) | 42.7 (108.9) | 45.5 (113.9) | 47 (117) | 48.9 (120.0) | 47.5 (117.5) | 46.5 (115.7) | 45 (113) | 45 (113) | 45 (113) | 43.6 (110.5) | 38 (100) | 48.9 (120.0) |
| Mean daily maximum °C (°F) | 30.4 (86.7) | 32.9 (91.2) | 36.3 (97.3) | 39.8 (103.6) | 42.5 (108.5) | 42.6 (108.7) | 40.3 (104.5) | 38.9 (102.0) | 40.0 (104.0) | 39.6 (103.3) | 35.4 (95.7) | 31.7 (89.1) | 37.5 (99.5) |
| Daily mean °C (°F) | 22.1 (71.8) | 24.1 (75.4) | 27.3 (81.1) | 31.1 (88.0) | 34.3 (93.7) | 35.1 (95.2) | 33.6 (92.5) | 32.6 (90.7) | 33.4 (92.1) | 32.4 (90.3) | 27.9 (82.2) | 23.6 (74.5) | 29.8 (85.6) |
| Mean daily minimum °C (°F) | 13.9 (57.0) | 15.2 (59.4) | 18.3 (64.9) | 22.5 (72.5) | 26.2 (79.2) | 27.5 (81.5) | 27.0 (80.6) | 26.4 (79.5) | 26.7 (80.1) | 25.2 (77.4) | 20.3 (68.5) | 15.6 (60.1) | 22.1 (71.8) |
| Record low °C (°F) | 3.7 (38.7) | 3.3 (37.9) | 8.4 (47.1) | 13.4 (56.1) | 17 (63) | 18.5 (65.3) | 18.2 (64.8) | 18.7 (65.7) | 18.4 (65.1) | 14.9 (58.8) | 10.3 (50.5) | 7 (45) | 3.3 (37.9) |
| Average precipitation mm (inches) | 0.0 (0.0) | 0.0 (0.0) | 0.0 (0.0) | 0.0 (0.0) | 2.1 (0.08) | 2.1 (0.08) | 26.5 (1.04) | 35.0 (1.38) | 18.4 (0.72) | 6.4 (0.25) | 0.0 (0.0) | 0.9 (0.04) | 91.4 (3.60) |
| Average precipitation days (≥ 1.0 mm) | 0.0 | 0.0 | 0.0 | 0.0 | 0.5 | 0.3 | 2.4 | 2.9 | 1.4 | 0.6 | 0.0 | 0.0 | 8.1 |
| Average relative humidity (%) | 28 | 25 | 21 | 18 | 20 | 23 | 33 | 41 | 34 | 29 | 28 | 29 | 27 |
| Mean monthly sunshine hours | 282.1 | 254.8 | 282.1 | 282.0 | 263.5 | 204.0 | 195.3 | 189.1 | 240.0 | 285.2 | 285.0 | 285.2 | 3,048.3 |
Source: NOAA

== Demographics ==
| Year | Population |
|---|---|
| 1973 (Census) | 24,161 |
| 1983 (Census) | 34,505 |
| 2007 (Estimate) | 55,516 |

== Economy ==
=== Agricultural sector ===
Shendi is considered one of the most important agricultural cities in northern Sudan and has the largest mango cultivation area in Sudan. Its products also include Egyptian beans, onions, and other vegetables and fruits that supply the capital and the neighboring major cities.

There are several projects for irrigated agriculture from the Nile River affiliated to the public and private sectors, most notably:

Government projects include: Capuchin, and Qandto, and Al-Bagrawiyah, and Jihad, and the martyr.

Private Sector Projects: The Misiktab, Sardia, Shaqlawa, Capuchin, Al-Jazirah Al-Sibyliyah, Wood Banga, Honey Stone, and Al-Basabir.

Existing investment projects: Doxan, Tala, Karawan, Coral Company for Agricultural and Livestock Production, Fayet Project for Agricultural Production.

=== Industrial sector ===
Shendi industry was known from an early age and there are several industries, the most important and oldest of which is the spinning and weaving industry, where there is a textile factory considered one of the first textile factories established in Sudan. It also has a soap factory. Some factories have also been established recently, including the Fayet Dairy Factory, which covers the city of Shendi and supplies the capital with products, as well as the cities of Atbara and Damer, as well as the establishment of a Rawabi factory, west of the city of Shendi

== Infrastructure ==
Roads have begun to be laid cross the city. The railway station in the city is no longer used for passenger travel, although freight trains continue to use the tracks. Local taxis and buses are available.

Mobile telephone coverage exists within the city, the neighboring towns of Al-Misiktab and Al-Mattamah, the outlying villages, and at the ancient Meroitic pyramids to the north. Internet connectivity is limited to the city.

== Institutions ==
Schools exist within the town and local villages.

A UNESCO funded center exists within the town to promote education in foreign languages and Information Technology.

Shendi University is a public university that was established in 1994. The university draws students from across Sudan to study there.
