= Frédéric Cailliaud =

French natural scientist and explorer

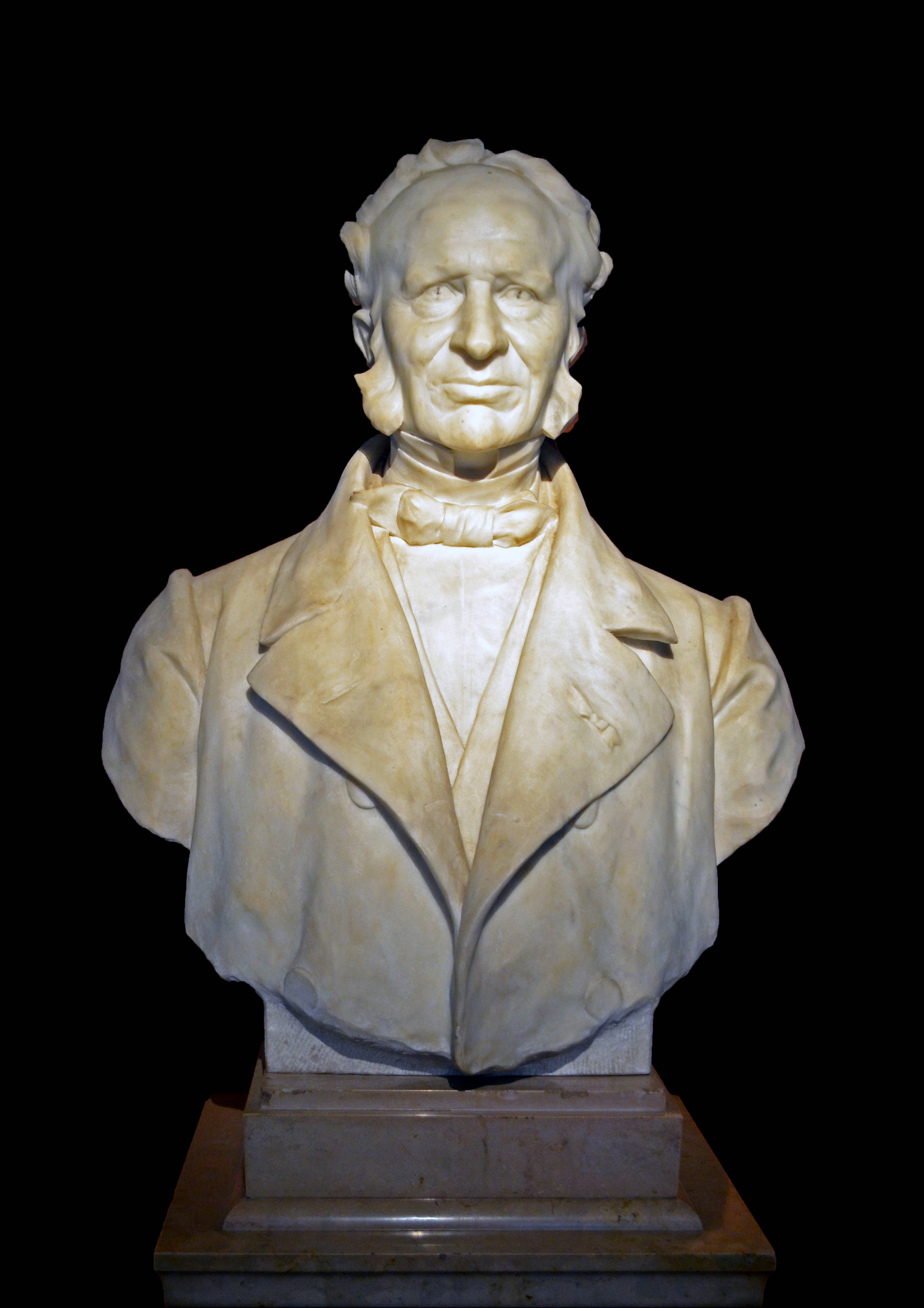
Bust of Frederic Cailliaud

Frédéric Cailliaud (9 June 1787 – 1 May 1869) was a French naturalist, mineralogist and conchologist. He was born, and died, in Nantes, where he was the curator of the Natural History Museum of Nantes from 1836 to 1869.

He travelled in Egypt, Nubia, and Ethiopia, collecting minerals and making observations. He was a part of the military expedition that his patron Viceroy Muhammad Ali sent south to conquer the Kingdom of Sennar, but also marched further into Fazogli where Caillaud searched for outcroppings of gold while the commander Ismail, son of Muhammad Ali, enslaved locals and slaughtered all who resisted him. Although he failed to find any sizeable deposits of gold in the mountains along the modern Sudan-Ethiopia border, he did make a sufficiently detailed survey of the area to be published after he returned to France in 1827.

Andrew Bednarski and W. Benson Harer, Jr. write:

Shortly after his return, he published Travels in the Oasis of Thebes, with never-before-seen information on the people and places of the Western Desert. His Travels to Meroë (mer-oh-ay) not only offered similarly pioneering information on the peoples and regions south of the Nile's first cataract, but also constituted the first scientific survey of Sudanese monuments. In addition, he brought back a large corpus of correctly copied textual material that, along with objects in his newly acquired collection, helped the historian Jean-François Champollion decipher the hieroglyphic language of ancient Egypt. So esteemed were Cailliaud's contributions to knowledge that in 1824 he was awarded the French Legion of Honor.

In addition to his two monumental works on Egypt, Travels in the Oasis of Thebes and Travels to Meroë, and his ample natural history publications, Cailliaud strove to produce an encyclopaedia on ancient and modern Nile civilizations. While the visual corpus for this material was produced in the 1830s, the supporting text was reworked numerous times right until Cailliaud's death. After his death the manuscript was lost until the early 2000s. It has since been recovered, translated, edited, combined with the intended visual material, augmented with supporting chapters and new artwork, and published through American University in Cairo Press (AUC Press).

== Works ==
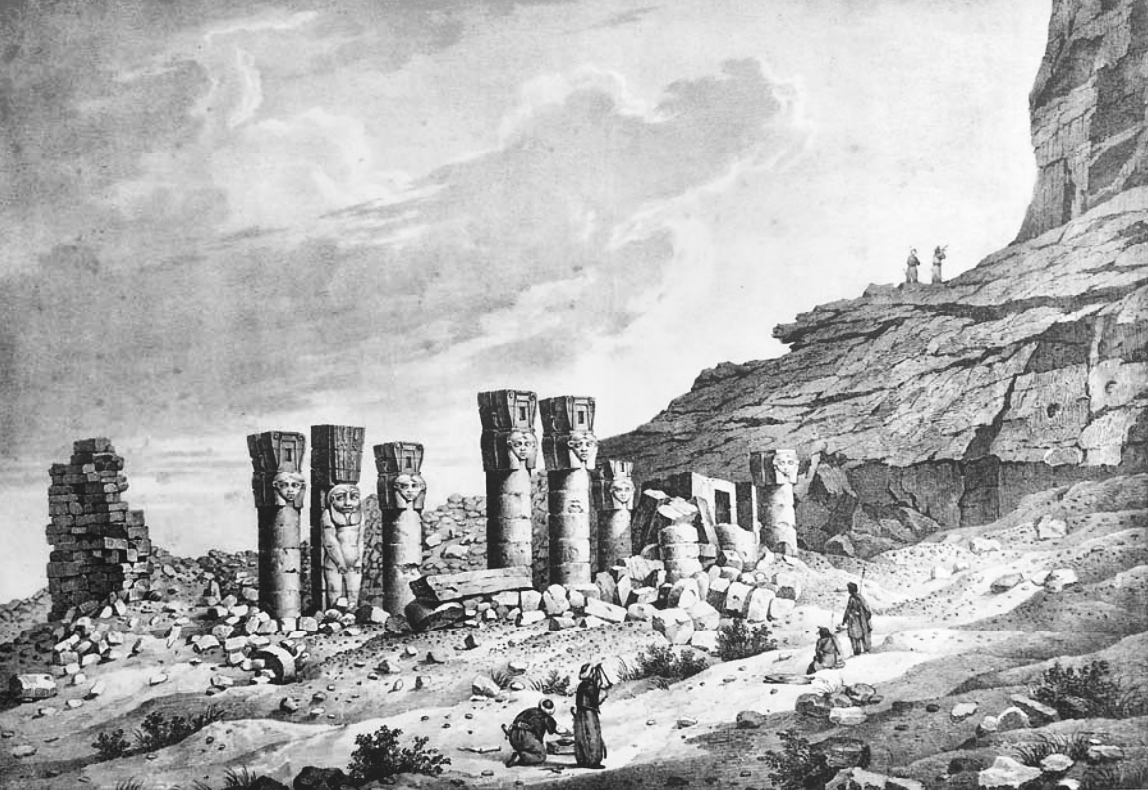
View of the ruins of B 300 in 1821 by Frédéric Cailliaud.

- Voyage à Meroë : au fleuve Blanc, au-delà de Fazoql dans le midi du royaume de Snnâr à Syouah tc.. 4 volumes Paris (1826–27), including an atlas
- Recherches sur les arts et métiers, les usages de la vie civile et domestique des anciens peuples de l'Égypte, de la Nubie et de l'Èthiopie. 2 volumes Paris (1831-37 ff.)
- Cailliaud, Frédéric, 1787-1869 Senka-Amen-seken, king of Nubia, clubbing his foes. (1902). From Travelers in the Middle East Archive (TIMEA). http://hdl.handle.net/1911/20811
- Cailliaud, Frédéric. "Explication de la carte détaillée du cours du Nil dans la haute et la basse Nubie". n.d. [Sans Titre]. OCLC Number: 767287264.
- Cailliaud, Frédéric. 1800. Des monstruosités chez divers mollusques. Nantes: Impr. de Mme veuve C. Mellinet.
- Cailliaud, Frédéric, and Jomard. 1821. Lettre de M. Cailliaud à M. Jomard sur les antiquités du mont Barkal et de Nourie en Nubie. Revue Encycl.; 11 (1821), 1. [Paris]: [Rignoux].
- Jomard, Edmé François, Frédéric Cailliaud, and Blondeau. 1821. Carte Itinéraire Du Désert Situé Entre Le Nil Et La Mer Rouge: comprenant La Montagne De Zabarah, les mines d'Émeraude, la mine de Soufre et les vestiges de l'ancienne route du commerce entre l'Égypte et l'Inde. Voyage À L'oasis De Thèbes Et Dans Les Déserts Situés À L'Orient Et À L'Occident De La Thébaïde. - Par Frédéric Cailliaud. Rédigé Et Publ. Par Jomard. [Paris]: [Impr. Royale].
- Jomard, Edmé François, Voyage à l'Oasis de Thèbes etc. 2 volumes Paris (1821–62)
  - Travels in the oasis of Thebes (trans. from the French). New voyages and travels, v. 7. London: R. Phillips & Co. 1822.
