= Kingdom of Fazughli =

16th to 17th-century Northeast African state

- c. 1500–1685
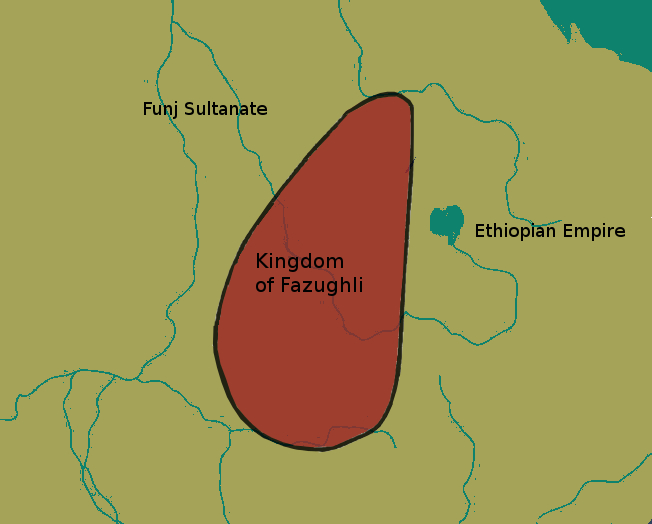
- Tentative estimation of the extent of the Kingdom of Fazughli
- Capital: Unspecified
- Common languages: Nubian and other Eastern Sudanic languages
- Religion: Coptic Orthodox Christianity
- Government: Monarchy
- Historical era: Early modern period
  - Established: c. 1500
  - Conquered by the Funj Sultanate: 1685
Preceded by	Succeeded by
Alodia	Sultanate of Sennar
- Today part of: Ethiopia; Sudan

The Kingdom of Fazughli was a precolonial state in what is now southeastern Sudan and western Ethiopia. Oral traditions assert its establishment by refugees from the Nubian Kingdom of Alodia, after its capital Soba had fallen to Arabs or the Funj in c. 1500. Centered around the mountainous region of Fazughli on the Blue Nile and serving as a buffer between the Funj sultanate and the Ethiopian empire, the kingdom lasted until its incorporation into the Funj sultanate in 1685.

== History ==
=== Formation ===
In the Middle Ages, large parts of central and southern Sudan, including the region of Fazughli on the border with Ethiopia, were controlled by the Christian Nubian Kingdom of Alodia. Since the 12th century Alodia had been in decline, a decline which would have been well advanced by c. 1300. In the 14th and 15th century Arab bedouin tribes overran most of Sudan, pushing as far south as Aba Island. By the second half of the 15th century virtually the whole of Alodia had been settled by Arabs except of the area around Soba, the capital of Alodia at the confluence of the Blue and White Nile. Soba was eventually conquered by the Arabs or the African Funj, with Sudanese sources dating that event to the 9th century after the Hijra (c. 1396–1494), the late 15th century, 1504 and 1509. The Funj then established a sultanate with Sennar as its capital, which would extend as far north as the third cataract of the Nile.

Historian Jay Spaulding suggests that Alodia outlived the fall of Soba. He believes that the "Kingdom of Soba" mentioned by the Jewish traveller David Reubeni in 1523 is a reference to Alodia and believes it to be located somewhere on the east bank of the Blue Nile. This "Kingdom of Soba" had a territory at a distance of ten days' journey and encompassed the "Kingdom of Al Ga'l", which was described as subordinate to Amara Dunqas, sultan of Sennar. "Al Ga'l" is probably a reference to the Arab Jaalin tribe. Using oral traditions, Spaulding continues to argue that the Alodians eventually abandoned the territory they still held in the lower Blue Nile valley and retreated to the mountainous region of Fazughli in the south, where they reestablished their kingdom. One tradition collected in the 19th century, for example, recalls that:

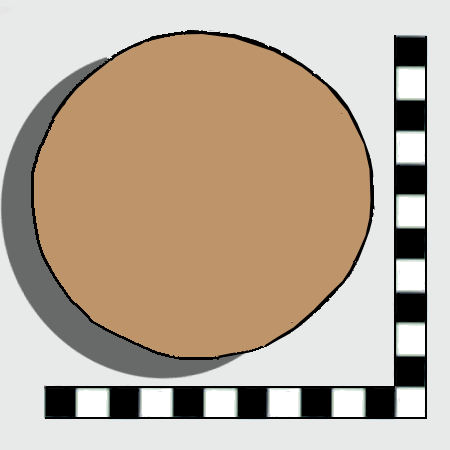
Copy of a spherical stone discovered in Mahadid, resembling the ritualized Soba stones of the Gule and Bertha people. Since they bear the name of Soba, the capital of Alodia, it is possible that they served as "material memories of an ancestral homeland upstream along the Blue Nile".

the kings of Fazughli, whose dominion extended over a large part of the peninsula of Sennar (the Gezira), and one of whose capitals had been the ancient Soba, had been forced to give way before the new arrivals... the Funj ... and to retire to their mountains... There... they maintained themselves... [Thus] the empire of Fazughli emerged from the debris of the kingdom of Soba.

Local traditions also remember Alodian migrations towards Fazughli. Fazughli as a place of Nubian exile is also mentioned in the Funj Chronicle, compiled around 1870. An archaeological culture named the "Jebel Mahadid tradition", centered around Mahadid in Qwara, western Ethiopia, with monumental architecture and pottery similar to that found in Soba, has very recently been attributed to these Alodian refugees. Considering the archaeological evidence, it has been suggested that they had already started arriving in the Ethiopian-Sudanese borderlands by the 14th century. Thus they would have arrived when Alodia still existed, but was in severe decline.

It has been warned that the traditions linking Fazughli to Alodia may not necessarily be factual, but were rather supposed to legitimize the rule of the Fazughlian king.

=== Between Sennar and Ethiopia ===
The Kingdom of Fazughli was located between the sultanate of Sennar and the Ethiopian empire, serving as a buffer between these two states. Africanist Alessandro Triulzi describes the approximate extension of the kingdom as follows:

to the east it included the Gumuz country between Gallabat and the Blue Nile, with its centre at Gubba; to the west it included the Burun country with its centre at Jebel Gule, whose realm was said to have extended as far south as Kaffa in southern Ethiopia, and to the south it included mostly the Bertha country along the gold-bearing Tumat valley down to Fadasi at the outskirts of the Oromo-inhabited territory.

Its territory would have been inhabited predominantly by speakers of Eastern Sudanic languages. According to Spaulding, it maintained the Christian faith, at least among the ruling Alodian elite. According to him, this Alodian elite would become known as the Hamaj, but it also might be possible that it was in fact the bulk of the Fazughlian population that constituted the Hamaj.

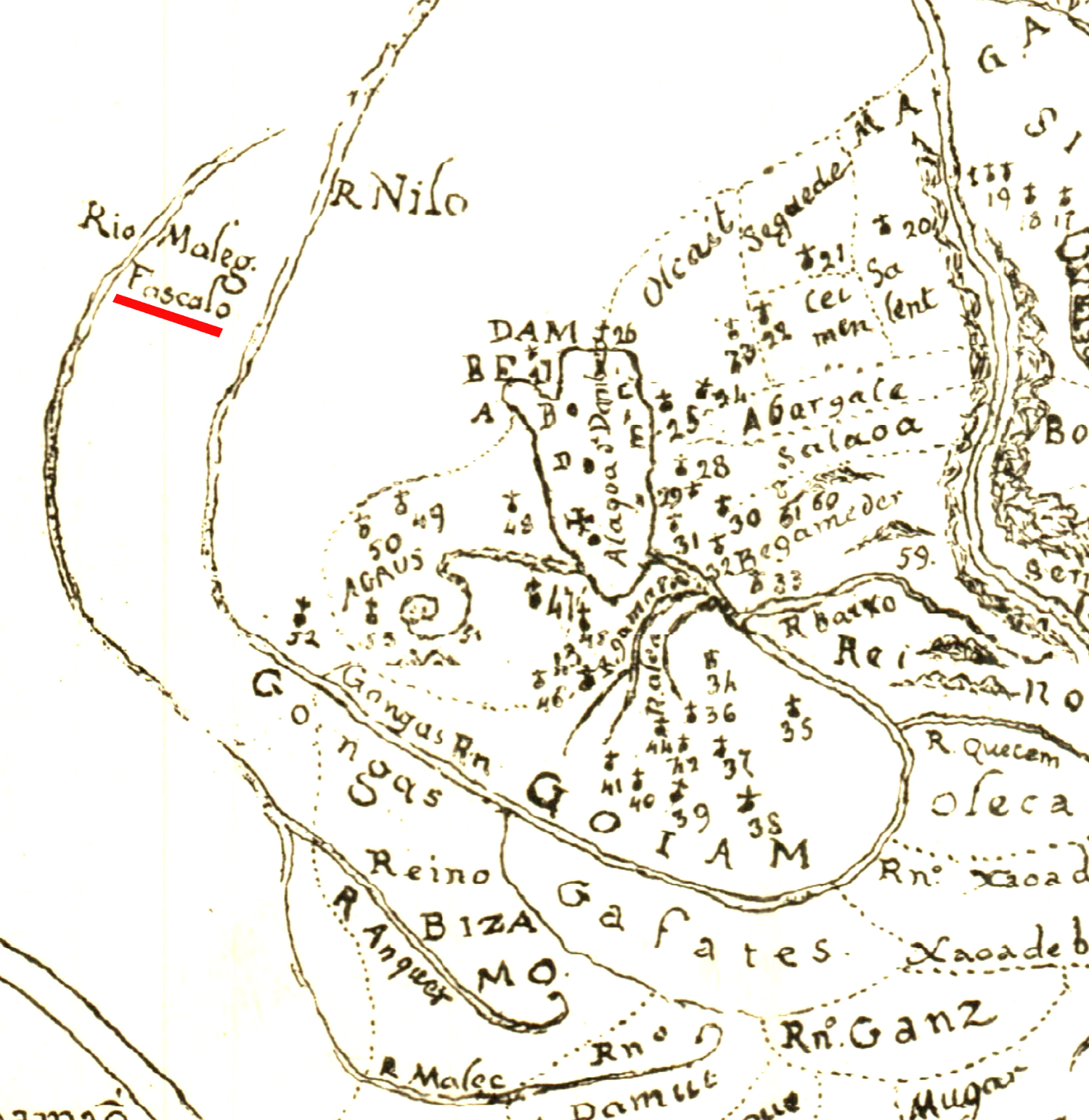
Fazughli ("Fascalo", underlined in red) on a Portuguese map from c. 1640.

Fazughli was famous for its gold. A Portuguese source from 1607 states that it had "much fine gold and good horses exchanging trade with the (Ethiopian) empire." Another one published in 1622 records that "(...) it is certain fact, as everyone says and Emperor Seltan Cagued (Susenyos) has told me, that the finest gold in all his lands is from the kingdom of Fazcolo". It would have been its gold that caught the attention of its neighbors, and both Ethiopia and Sennar would make periodic, yet mostly ungrounded claims that Fazughli's gold fields were in their respective domains. Nevertheless, the period from the late 15th to early 17th century would have been a troubled one for the Ethiopian-Sudanese borderlands, as is reflected by the "Jebel Mahadid tradition" settlements, which were not only located on naturally defended positions, but were also protected by additional defensive systems. The Hamaj are recorded to have been involved in the Abyssinian–Adal war, being allied to the people of Shire in northern Ethiopia, near Kassala. During the reign of sultan Dakin (1568–1585) there was said to be an expedition to Abu Ramlah, just south of Mahadid. Dakin was defeated and when he returned to Sennar he was confronted with Ajib, an ambitious minor prince of northern Nubia. First Ajib acquired greater autonomy, then he eventually vassalized the Funj sultans and finally, in 1606, he invaded the Gezira and pushed the current sultan, Abd al-Qadir II, into Ethiopia. An oral tradition recalls that Ajib founded several mosques in what would have been Fazughlian territory, which, if the tradition is accurate, might suggest a Fazughlian involvement in the power struggle between Ajib and Sennar, possibly by taking sides with Ajib. If an intrusion of Ajib's forces into Fazughlian territory occurred it would have been of short duration, without lasting consequences. Ajib was eventually killed in battle in 1611–1612.

In 1615, Fazughli is said to have been conquered by the Ethiopian emperor Susenyos, which, according to Spaulding, resulted in the loss of its independence. Mahadid is attested to have been destroyed in the 16th or early 17th century, which can possibly be attributed to the Ethiopians or the Funj. The Ethiopian emperors attempted to integrate Fazughli into the realm, but within seventy years, with the death of Emperor Yohannes I, Ethiopia had lost control over Fazughli. With the decline of Ethiopian influence Sennar attempted to fill the vacuum. In 1685 "the Hameg princelings of Fazughli" were subdued by Sennar.

=== Fazughli under the Funj ===
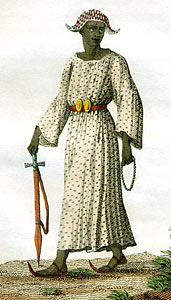
Funj governor (manjil) of Fazughli, c. 1820

It is recorded that the Funj retained the current ruler of Fazughli instead of replacing him with a new provincial governor. As vassals of Sennar, the governors of Fazughli received the title of manjil. According to Spaulding, the Hamaj remained Christian for at least a generation after the conquest, but by the mid-18th century they had converted to Islam. A Christian princedom, Shaira, was said to have existed in the Ethiopian-Sudanese border area as late as the early 1770s. Customs of Christian origin continued to be practiced in the Upper Blue Nile as late as the early 20th century. Integrated into the sultanate of Sennar, the Hamaj would become one of its most dominant ethnic groups and Fazughli, together with the two other southern provinces of Kordofan and Alays, became one of its most important provinces, which was mostly due to the significance of its gold for Sennar's economy. In 1761–1762 Muhammad Abu Likayik, a military commander originating from Fazughli, assembled a "heterogenous collection of neo-Alodian noblemen, warlords, slave soldiers, merchants, and fuqara (religious teachers)" and seized control of the sultanate, initiating the Hamaj Regency, which lasted until the Turko-Egyptian invasion of 1821.
