= Funj people =

Ethnic group in present-day Sudan

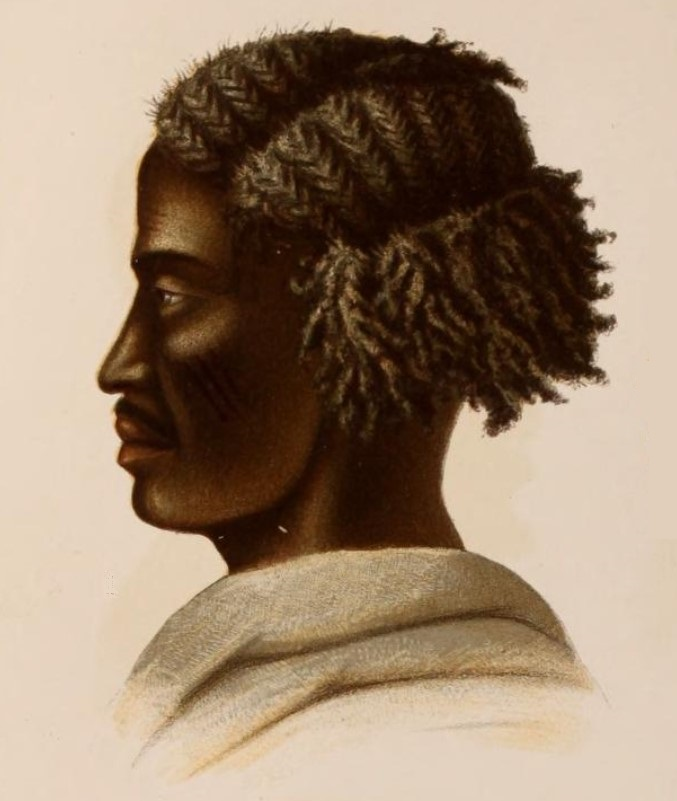
Portrait of a Funj man, 1876

The Funj are a group of tribes in present-day Sudan. They speak Berta languages. The historical Funj rose south of the Nile confluence (sources differ on their geographic origin) and had overthrown the remnants of the old Christian kingdom of Alodia. In 1504 a Funj leader named Amara Dungus, founded a sultanate at Sinnar (the capital) after defeating the northern Abdallab Sultanate. The resulting kingdom would be known as the Kingdom of Sinnar, the Funj Sultanate, or the Blue Sultanate, and would rule most of modern-day Sudan until the Ottoman conquest in 1821.

== Origins ==
The origins of the Funj are debated by scholars. There is only limited evidence for a pre-Arabic Funj language from the Sultanate period. Sources contemporary to the Funj Sultanate and modern Sudanese oral tradition describe them as a 'blue' or dark-skinned African people residing in the mountains of the Blue Nile region, originating further upstream in a place referred to as "Lul". In the 18th-century, the Wad Doleyb manuscript classified them as Nuba, a term applied to non-royal Fur, "Anaj" Danagla, and the peoples west and south of the banks of the White Nile. In the 19th-century portion of the Wad Doleyb manuscript, the Funj are said to have been subjects of Abyssinia before gaining power, breaking away, and forming their own kingdom. The authors of the document consider Funj to be sudan ("Blacks") and descendants of Ham son of Noah, but distinct from the Zunj (another branch of Hamites and sudan), a term applied in the document to the "Jangay" (likely the Dinka), Zaghawa, and so-called "Hamaj" (literally "savage") groups. Today, a number of different linguistic groups in southeastern Sudan are described as Funj, most frequently the Berta/Benishangul, who refer to their language as Ndu Alfuñu literally, "Funj language" or "Funj mouth". The word for 'mouth' is commonly also the term for 'language' in North East Africa, see Middle Egyptian 𓂋𓏤 Old Nubian agil, and Somali af each primarily meaning 'mouth' and also 'speech'/'language'. Wendy James also found Funj identification and claims of Sinnari origin among Ingessana, southern Burun-speaking peoples, and the people of Jebel Gule.

These groups continue to claim descent from Funj rulers, although European academics, such as Jay Spaulding, argue this is the result of post-Sultanate political events that led to the former southeastern tributaries of Sinnar adopting a prestigious Funj identity, without implying an ethnic or hereditary connection. James concluded that the term "Funj" today has no "exclusive or even special associations with one ethnic group, culture, or homeland in the region." According to her research, north of Sinnar, the term "Funj" is a racial-ethnic term connoting "local dark-skinned people" (specifically those of Darfunj, south of Sinnar, along the Blue Nile). South of Sinnar, it is used to describe Islamicized local groups of free status, in contrast to pagans and groups historically targeted for enslavement. In South Sudan, the term appears in a variety of languages as a means of describing "lighter-colored, reddish people," and is applied to various foreigners.

There are five different hypotheses regarding their origin. The Funj claimed to be descendants of Banu Umayya through those who escaped the slaughter of their family by the Abbasids and fled to Abyssinia and thence into the Nubian territory. Since the Ja'alin claimed descent from the Abbasids and the Abdallab from the Juhayna, the Funj may have claimed Umayyad descent to express their superiority to their subject peoples.

James Bruce, in his book Travels to Discover the Source of the Nile, theorized that the Funj descend from the Shilluk people. Bruce wrote his book after 22 years of travel through North Africa and Ethiopia in the 18th century. The third hypothesis is that they are descendants of the remnants of the Kingdom of Alodia Nubians who escaped further south to replenish their supplies and resources and returned to establish their state. This theory's strongest proponent is Jay Spaulding, and is based on resemblances between Funj and Christian Nubian institutions. AJ Arkell also theorized they may be Bornu, migrating from Darfur in the west.

Critical of these approaches, Wendy James argued the Funj may instead represent a social class of detribalized local Muslims forged by the sociopolitics processes of Sinnar, stressing the lack of evidence for a pre-Sinnar Funj identity. Within this framework, she has hypothesized that "self-sufficient pagan societies on the periphery of the Nile civilizations have for perhaps many centuries regarded lighter-colored people from the north and perhaps also from the east and Abyssinia as bwonyo, bunyan, or even fuin, in the sense of an alien elite." This term was then applied to the new conquering class of former Alodian territory, which represented members of those societies who had adopted Islam and Arabic through employment, enslavement, and intermarriage.

The contemporary Funj makk, Al-Wileyd al-Makk Nayil described the historic Funj as a "ruling class" rather than a tribe or ethnic group in a Sudanese television program.

The question of their origin is considered one of the great questions of Sudanese historiography, and there continues to be no consensus among scholars.

== Notable people ==
- Nasra bint ʿAdlan, noblewoman and power broker
