= Unsa II =

Unsa II (r. 1681–1692) was a ruler of the Kingdom of Sennar. He was the son of Nassir, the brother of the previous ruler Rabat I; Unsa ascended to the throne in 1681.

The most noteworthy event of his reign was a great famine afflicted his kingdom, which forced the inhabitants to kill and eat dogs.

Preceded by Badi II	King of Sennar	Succeeded by Badi III
