= Badi I =

Badi I (1611/12 – 1616/17), also known as Badi el Kawam, was a ruler of the Kingdom of Sennar. During his reign, Sennar was at peace with its neighbor, Ethiopia. The Ethiopian Royal Chronicles mention that Emperor Susenyos of Ethiopia responded to the gift Badi's predecessor had sent him by sending to Sultan Badi bracelets of gold and a gold-mounted saddle.

However, according to James Bruce, Badi found insult in the negarit which Emperor Susenyos had sent his father, Abd al-Qadir, interpreting it as a symbol that Sennar was a dependency of Ethiopia. This led him to sending an insulting present to Susenyos—two old, blind and lame horses—then followed up the insult by sending his retainer Nile Wed Ageeb to raid Ethiopian territories. Susenyos met this threat by making a separate treaty of peace with Wed Ageeb, who went over to the Ethiopian side.

The hostilities between the two kingdoms increased when the governor of the Mazaga, Alico, who was a servant of Emperor Susenyos, fled to Sennar with a number of the Emperor's horses. Susenyos complained of this to Badi, who refused to reply; further insulted, Susenyos summoned Nile Wed Ageeb to his headquarters at Gunka, and the two of them plundered the territory of Sennar along their shared frontier as far as Fazuclo. According to Bruce, this was "a cause of much bloodshed, and of a war which, at least in intention, last to this day between the two kingdoms."

Preceded by Adlan I	King of Sennar	Succeeded by Rabat I
