= Badi II =

Bādī II Abū Daqn, known as The Bearded (r. 1644/5 – 1681), was a ruler of the Kingdom of Sennar (also known as the Funj Sultanate). He was the son of Rabat I and ascended to the throne in 1644/5.

During the reign of Badi II, the Kingdom of Taqali to the west was defeated and made a vassal state. He captured northern and western parts of Kordofan and extended Funj territory across the White Nile, occupying the northern half of the Shilluk Kingdom in 1650 and defeating the Abdallabi tribes who were supported by the Ottoman Empire. He defeated the Darfur Sultan Musa by the mid-1650s and reduced the tribal chieftaincies northward along the Nile to feudatories.

Through his conquests, Badi II formed a slave army, drawing primarily from the population of Nuba mountains . The captured slaves were taken to Sennar where their influence grew and they formed a military caste that later fought with the aristocracy for control of state offices.

Under Badi II, Sennar became the fixed capital of the Funj Sultanate. During his reign written documents concerning administrative matters first appeared, with the oldest known dating to 1654.

Badi II died in 1681. He was succeeded by Unsa II.

Preceded by Rabat I	King of Sennar	Succeeded by Unsa II
