= Abdallabi tribe =

Arab tribe from central Sudan

Abdallabi
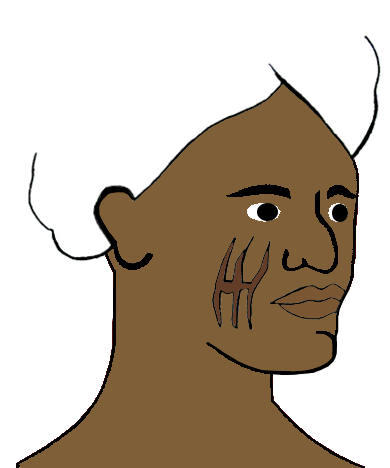
- The Abdallabi tribal scarification consisted of two merged H's
- Ethnicity: Abdallabi
- Location: Sudan
- Language: Arabic
- Religion: Sunni Islam

The Abdallabi (or Abdallab) are people living in central Sudan who claim descent from Abdallah Jamma’a, they are the native peoples of Khartoum state as well as the Al Jazirah (state) with an important presence in North Kordofan and Sennar, They were an important political force between the fifteenth and eighteenth centuries. For a short time the Abdallabi succeeded in establishing an independent state, but they were defeated by the Funj Sultanate in 1504 and thereafter ruled over the Butana as vassals until the Egyptian conquest of 1820., The Abdallab are the indigenous people of Khartoum Al Jazirah and Northern Sennar states as well as parts of Kordofan They are superficially seen as part of the Ja'alin Confederation though not as authentic Ja'alin like those from Shendi and Atbara.

== History ==
Historical accounts show that the Nubian ancestors of the Abdallabi originally spoke Alwan-Nubian, The area of Khartoum state Al Jazirah (state) and the Butana was the homeland of the Anaj or the Nobility of the Nubians of Alodia which was the more Economically and Militarily powerful Kingdom then its Northern neighbour Makuria as a result of the agricultural lands of the Butana ruled by the kingdom of Alwa, after the fall of Soba to Abdalla jamma'a, the Indigenous Nubian ethnic group of this region khartoum state the Butana (Al Jazirah and Al Qadarif) and Northern Sennar, known as the Anaj came to be known as the Abdallab and became arabized previously speaking Alwan-Nubian, however brun-rollet a sardinian/Italian traveller in 1859 heard the term Anaidj (Anaji) applied to the people of the Abdallab homeland (khartoum state, Al jazirah) and some of them continued the custom of swearing oaths by "soba the city of my ancestors" and kept the scarification ritual of the Anaj.

After the fall of the kingdom of Alwa there was an independent Abdallabi state that encompassed the Abdallabi heartland of Khartoum state Al jazirah and Al Qadarif,this short lived state was then defeated by the Funj in 1504,the Abdallab then ruled their homeland on behalf of the Funj the Butana and parts of Northern Sudan as Governors and vassals, In turn the Funj became Nubianized and adopted the Alwan (Anaj/Hamaj) bureaucratic Tradition and relied heavily on the Abdallab as the bureaucracy of the Funj sultanate especially in governing The Riverine tribes of North Sudan, The Funj-Abdallabi Alliance was the foundational political pact that established the Funj Sultanate (also known as the Sultanate of Sennar or the Blue Sultanate) in 1504. This historical agreement united the indigenous Funj people of the south (Who lived mainly in Blue Nile State) with the Abdallabi tribe of khartoum state and the Butana, effectively shaping the political and cultural landscape of modern-day Sudan

Different Sudanese from all across Sudan have since migrated to what was once the Abdallabi Native homeland ( like Khartoum state and Al Jazirah) since Anglo-Egyptian Sudan rule.

== Abdallah Jamma’a ==
Abdallah Jamma’a, the eponymous ancestor of the Abdallabi tribe, was a Rufa'a Arab. His nickname (“the gatherer”) referred to the hordes of tribesmen he was able to gather for his campaigns. According to tradition, he settled in the Nile valley after coming from the east, consolidated his power and established his capital at Qarri, just north of the confluence of the two Niles, at the start of the route across the desert to Dongola. In the late 15th century he led a rebellion against the Christian kingdom of Alodia by the Muslim Arab tribes no longer willing to accept its rule or taxation. Under Abdallah's leadership Alodia and its capital Soba were destroyed, resulting in rich booty such as a "bejeweled crown" and a "famous necklace of pearls and rubies". There is a variant tradition that ascribes the fall of Alodia to the Funj, a group from the south led by their king Amara Dunqas, but most modern scholars agree that it fell to the Arabs.

The Sudanese chronicler Katib al-Shuna makes brief reference to Abdallah Jamma’a cooperating with Amara Dunqas to fight the indigenous people of Alodia, but apparently the Funj were able to defeat the Abdallabis decisively in a battle near Arbaji in 1504. Abdallah Jamma’a ‘thus became as it were their lieutenant’.

Abdallah Jamma’a's sons were the founders of the leading Abdallabi clans - Ajib al-Kafuta of the Ajibab clan, Muhammad Dayoum of the Dayoumab, Idris al Anker of the Ankeryab, Muhammad Badirkoga of the Badirkogab, and Saba of the Sabab.

== ‘Ajib al-Kafuta ==
When Abdallah Jamma‘a died in the reign of the Funj sultan Amara ii Abu Sikaykin (1557–69), his son ‘Ajib al-Kafuta was appointed to succeed him. In 1576 ‘Ajib defeated an Ottoman invasion and penetrated Egypt as far as Aswan, pushing Ottoman rule back to the First Cataract. In 1622 the northern Abdallabi frontier was finally settled at Hannik, just north of Dongola.

Early in the seventeenth century ‘Ajib revolted and drove out the Funj sultan ‘Abd al-Qadir II, who fled to Ethiopia. The Funj sultans were at least nominally Muslims by this time, but Abdallabi tradition describes the revolt of ‘Ajib al-Kafuta as a holy war, followed by the building of mosques up the Blue Nile and in the Ethiopian marches. ‘Ajib is also represented as making the Pilgrimage to Mecca.

‘Abd al-Qadir‘s brother, ‘Adlan I, regained the throne, and in 1611-1612 defeated ‘Ajib at the battle of Karkoj, on the Blue Nile south of Sennar. ‘Ajib himself died in the battle, and his sons fled to Dongola. The mediation of a Muslim holy man, Shaykh Idris wad al-Arbab, obtained an amnesty for them. They returned to Qarri, where one of them, Muhammad al-Aqil, was appointed shaykh.

== Rulers 1611-1821 ==
Muhammad al-Aqil died after ruling for twenty-five years and defeating an Ethiopian invasion. He was succeeded by his son Abdallah Al-Brins who reigned peacefully for seventeen years. After him ruled:

- Hago ibn Uthman (five years)
- Sheikh Ajib II (six years)
- Mismar, brother of Sheikh Ajib (five years)
- Sheikh Ali (seven years)
- Sheikh Hamid as-Simeih (ten years), deposed and fled to Darfur
- Sheikh Ajib III (twenty-five years)
- Sheikh Bader, son of Sheikh Ajib (four years)
- Sheikh Diab Abu Naib, son of Bader (nine years)
- Sheikh Abdallah III, uncle of Diab (eight or more years), who moved the capital from Qarri to Halfayat al-Muluk and died during an invasion by the sultan of Darfur.
- Sheikh Mismar II (five years)
- Sheikh Nasir ibn Shammam (eight years), deposed and exiled to Sennar
- Sheikh Ajib IV (‘The Elephant’) (twenty years)
- Umar ash-Sheikh Abdallah (two years)
- Sheikh Amin Mismar (twenty years)
- Sheikh Abdallah IV (?? years)
- Sheikh Nasir ibn Sheikh al-Amin (twenty-five years), rule at the time of the Egyptian conquest of Sudan (1820–1824)
- Al-Amin, his eldest son, who ruled as an Egyptian vassal

== The Abdallabi polity ==
The Funj Sultanate was not a centralized state, and much power was held by vassals. The ‘Abdallabi shaykhs of Qarri, who bore the title manjil or manjilak, were viceroys of the north and the most important of these vassals.

The power of the ‘Abdallabi depended on the ability of their mounted soldiers to raise taxes from settled farmers, and to exercise some control over the cattle nomads of the plains. An important source of revenue was customs dues; the destruction of Christian Alodia meant that new trade and pilgrimage routes crossing Sudan from east to west began to open up, connecting Mecca and Medina with the Lake Chad region.

Neither the Funj nor their Abdallabi viceroys were able to prevent the Shaigiya tribe from throwing off Funj rule in the seventeenth century. Some degree of Abdallabi authority over the Beja tribes of the northeast is perhaps suggested by the legend of a marriage between a woman of the Amerar Beja and either ‘Ajib al-Kafuta or his brother.

In the middle of the 18th century, during the reign of Sheikh Abdallah III, the capital of the Abdallabi realm was moved south from Qarri to Halfayat al-Muluk, just north of modern Khartoum. This move appears to have been motivated by both political and commercial reasons. Qarri was a customs post on caravan routes but had little trade of its own, while the lands around it were not particularly productive. The Abdallabis kept their base at Halfayat al-Muluk until the Egyptian invasion, but by that time Qarri was in ruins.

== The Turkiyyah ==
Sheikh Nasir ibn Sheikh al-Amin was near the end of his life when Egyptian armies under Ismail Kamil Pasha invaded Sudan in 1820. In 1821 Sheikh Nasir submitted to Egyptian rule without resistance, and sent his son his eldest son Al-Amin to accompany the invaders as they continued their campaign south towards Sennar, leaving a garrison behind in Halfaya. Soon after they left, Sheikh al-Amin died and Al-Amin was appointed to succeed him. However, in 1822 the Ja'alin tribe rebelled in Shendi, killing Ismail, and the Abdallabis in Halfaya likewise rose up and killed the Egyptian garrison. Muhammad Khusraw, the Defterdar Bey, brought Egyptian forces back from Kordofan and Al-Amin fled to Gallabat.

A decade later the Egyptian government pardoned Al-Amin's cousin Miri and allowed him to return to Halfaya as Sheikh. He was succeeded briefly by Sheikh Muhammad Nasir, and then by Muhammad Nasir's brother Idris Nasir, who was held in high regard by the government despite conspiring with the Egyptian viceroy to remove Sudan from Egyptian rule and pledge direct allegiance to the Ottoman Empire. He was succeeded by Sheikh Jamma’a Sheikh al-Amin, who was an army commander when the Mahdiyyah broke out in 1881 and died on campaign in Kordofan.

His successor Nasir Jamma’a managed to retain his authority over the Abdallabis throughout the Mahdiyya and died resisting the Anglo-Egyptian conquest of Sudan. His successor Sheikh al-Amin Umar however made his peace with the Condominium government. Sheikh Muhammad al-Sheikh Jamma’a, his successor, was awarded a medal by King George V during a royal visit to Port Sudan in 1912.

See also

- Ja'alin tribe
