= Badi III =

Ruler of the Kingdom of Sennar (1692–1716)

Bādī III, or Bādī al-Aḥmar ( badi the red) (1692–1716), was a ruler of the Kingdom of Sennar. James Bruce includes in his account of Ethiopia the translation of a letter the Ethiopian Emperor Tewolfos sent him dated 21 January 1706, wherein he addresses him as "king Baady, son of king Ounsa".

According to a manuscript history known as The History of Nuba (British Museum Arabic MS. 2345), Bādī was confronted with a pretender, Awkal, whom he defeated.

== Attempted modernization ==
In the late 17th century, Badi III attempted to modernize the army by importing firearms and even cannons, but they were quickly disregarded after his death not only because the import was expensive and unreliable, but also because the traditionally armed elites feared for their power.

== Badi according to Europeans ==
C. J. Poncet, who passed through Sennar in 1699 on his way to provide medical services to Emperor Iyasu I of Ethiopia, left this description of his interview with King Bādī:

When we had almost past over the court, they oblig'd us to stop short before a stone, which is near to an open hall, where the King usually gives audience to embassadors [sic]. There we saluted the king according to the custom of the country, falling upon our knees and thrice kissing the ground. That prince is 19 years of age, dark brown, almost black but well shap'd and of a majestick presence; not having thick lips nor flat nose, like many of his subjects. He was seated upon a rich bed under a canopy, with his legs across, after the oriental fashion; and round him twenty old men, seated after the same manner, but somewhat lower. He was cloath'd with a long vest of silk, embroider'd with gold, and girt with a kind of scarf made of fine calico. He had a white turban on his head. The old men were clad much after the same manner.

Poncet's departure from Sennar was delayed at the border for 19 days until 11 June 1699, due to the death of sultan Bādī's mother. A Jesuit residing at Port Said, Jean Verzaeu, wrote on 20 October 1700 that the kingdom and Ethiopia were at war over the assassination of a Sennar national in Ethiopia, and that the trade route between the two countries was closed.

Because of the success of Poncet's visit to Ethiopia, Benoît de Maillet, the French consul at Cairo, ordered Lenoir de Roule to visit the Ethiopian Emperor on behalf of Louis XIV. Due to the hostility of the natives of the lands he travelled through, de Roule was unable to get any further than Sennar, where he was murdered with his 5 companions in front of the royal palace on November 10, 1705. Although King Bādī was seen by many as being responsible for this act, the Scots traveller James Bruce, who travelled through Sennar later in the 18th century, accused the Franciscans of having manipulated the events that led to these deaths.

== Sources ==
- O'Fahey, R.S.; Spaulding, J.L (1974). Kingdoms of the Sudan. Studies of African History Vol. 9. London: Methuen. ISBN 0-416-77450-4.

Preceded by Unsa II	King of Sennar	Succeeded by Unsa III
