= Adlan I =

17th-century ruler of the Kingdom of Sennar

Adlan I (reigned 1606 – 1611/12) was a ruler of the Kingdom of Sennar.

== Life ==
He was the son of Ayat, although James Bruce writes he was the son of Unsa I and the brother of Abd al-Qadir, whom he deposed and exiled from Sennar. Adlan was, in turn, deposed by his nephew Badi.

During his reign, Sennar was at peace with its neighbor, Ethiopia. The Ethiopian Royal Chronicles mention that Adlan sent a team of fine horses to Emperor Susenyos as gifts.

| Preceded by Abd al-Qadir II | King of Sennar | Succeeded by Badi I |
