= Rabat I =

Rabat I (1616/7 - 1644/5) was a ruler of the Kingdom of Sennar. According to James Bruce, he was the son of Badi I.

He intrigued in Ethiopian politics a number of times. Early in his reign he detained the Coptic bishop Abba Yeshaq, who had passed through Sennar on his way to Ethiopia. A later act was his attempt to convert Saga Krestos, the son of Emperor Yaqob of Ethiopia, to Islam, which resulted in Saga Krestos' departure.

In response to a slave raid by Emperor Susenyos of Ethiopia in 1619, Rabat led a great army against the Ethiopians, and slew one of the Imperial officials, a Muslim named Muhammed Sayed. In response, Emperor Susenyos marched to the border and was defeated by Rabat's army.

== Notes ==
| Preceded by Badi I | King of Sennar | Succeeded by Badi II |
