= Dakin of Sennar =

Dakin (1568–1585 or 1586) was a ruler of the Kingdom of Sennar. He was the son of the previous ruler Nayil.

Preceded by Abu Sakikin	King of Sennar	Succeeded by Dawra
