= Amara Dunqas =

First ruler of the Funj Sultanate from 1504 to 1533/4

Amara Dunqas was the first ruler of the Kingdom of Sennar, which he ruled from 1504 - 1533/4. "Dunqas" is an epithet meaning "bent down, with an inclined head", referring to the way of how he required his subjects to approach him.

According to James Bruce, he founded the city of Sennar after the Wad 'Ajib had been defeated by the Funj in a battle near Arbaji. Doing this he moved the seat of government of Wad ‘Ajib to Arbaji, that he might be more immediately under their own eye.

Following the Ottoman conquest of Egypt in 1517, Amara Dunqas skillfully used diplomacy to keep the Ottoman armies from advancing further up the Nile and conquering his realm, thus securing the future of the kingdom. Some sources suggest that Amara may have agreed to nominal tributary status or diplomatic recognition in exchange for autonomy. This allowed Sennar to remain effectively independent while giving the Ottomans a sense of regional control.

In 1523 the Jewish traveller David Reubeni passed through the territory of a king 'Amara, who is usually identified with Amara Dunqas. Two years later, Amara is briefly mentioned by the Ottoman admiral Selman Reis as the ruler of a kingdom, that, while described as requiring a three-month journey to cross it, was weak and hence easily conquerable.

Preceded by none	King of Sennar	Succeeded by Nayil
