= Sennar =

Sennar سنار
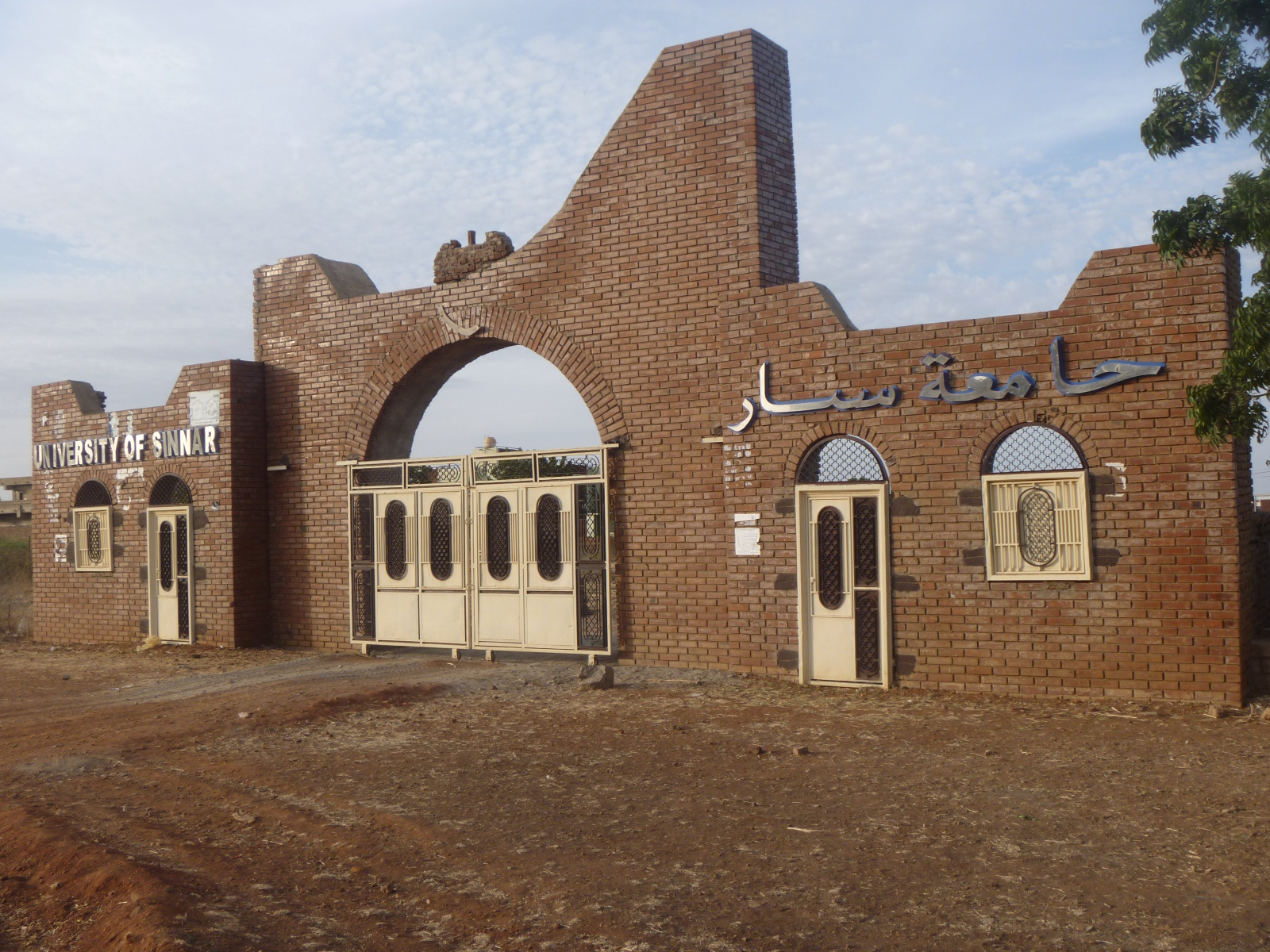
- Sennar University Gate

- Location in Sudan
- Coordinates: 13°33′N 33°35′E
- Country: Sudan
- State: Sennar State

Population (2007)
  - Total: 143,059

Sennar (Arabic: سنار, romanized: Sannār) is a city on the Blue Nile in Sudan and possibly the capital of the state of Sennar. For several centuries it was the capital of the Funj Kingdom of Sennar and until at least 2011, Sennar was the capital of Sennar State.

== History ==
The area was under Kushite and Meroitic rule from 750 BC to around 350 AD. The area came under Alwan rule, Which Alwa ruled Sennar for centuries, after which the Alwans were overthrown by the Funj who made Sennar their capital.

== Climate ==
Despite receiving over 430 millimetres or 17 inches of rainfall per year, the extreme heat and high evapotranspiration means Sennar only has a very borderline hot semi-arid climate (Köppen BSh), lying extremely close to a hot arid climate (BWh). Like all of the Sahel, Sennar features a short wet season from mid-June to September, and a long dry season. The dry season itself divides into a merely hot period from October to February and a sweltering period from March to mid-June when the monsoon arrives, reducing the extreme heat but making the weather even more uncomfortable due to higher humidity.

Climate data for Sennar (1991–2020, extremes 1907–present)
Month	Jan	Feb	Mar	Apr	May	Jun	Jul	Aug	Sep	Oct	Nov	Dec	Year
Record high °C (°F)	44 (111)	45.9 (114.6)	47 (117)	47 (117)	47 (117)	46.5 (115.7)	42.7 (108.9)	41.5 (106.7)	44.6 (112.3)	46 (115)	41.5 (106.7)	40.3 (104.5)	47 (117)
Mean daily maximum °C (°F)	33.4 (92.1)	36.0 (96.8)	39.2 (102.6)	41.8 (107.2)	40.7 (105.3)	39.1 (102.4)	35.6 (96.1)	33.5 (92.3)	35.6 (96.1)	37.5 (99.5)	36.8 (98.2)	34.2 (93.6)	37.0 (98.6)
Daily mean °C (°F)	23.2 (73.8)	25.4 (77.7)	28.4 (83.1)	31.8 (89.2)	32.7 (90.9)	32.0 (89.6)	29.3 (84.7)	27.8 (82.0)	29.0 (84.2)	29.7 (85.5)	27.1 (80.8)	24.2 (75.6)	28.4 (83.1)
Mean daily minimum °C (°F)	13.0 (55.4)	14.8 (58.6)	17.7 (63.9)	21.8 (71.2)	24.8 (76.6)	24.8 (76.6)	23.1 (73.6)	22.2 (72.0)	22.4 (72.3)	22.0 (71.6)	17.3 (63.1)	14.2 (57.6)	19.8 (67.6)
Record low °C (°F)	4 (39)	4.6 (40.3)	6 (43)	10 (50)	15 (59)	16.7 (62.1)	17 (63)	17.2 (63.0)	17 (63)	13 (55)	7.5 (45.5)	4.7 (40.5)	4 (39)
Average rainfall mm (inches)	0.1 (0.00)	0.0 (0.0)	1.1 (0.04)	2.1 (0.08)	22.4 (0.88)	43.3 (1.70)	127.5 (5.02)	146.0 (5.75)	68.3 (2.69)	23.4 (0.92)	2.5 (0.10)	0.0 (0.0)	436.6 (17.19)
Average rainy days (≥ 1.0 mm)	0.0	0.0	0.1	0.5	2.7	4.3	8.9	10.9	5.4	2.1	0.1	0.0	35.1
Average relative humidity (%)	39	31	26	25	36	48	64	73	68	58	44	44	46
Mean monthly sunshine hours	313.1	274.4	297.6	279.0	266.6	240.0	204.6	201.5	237.0	282.1	306.0	316.2	3,218.1
Source 1: NOAA
Source 2: Meteo Climat (record highs and lows)

== Demographics ==
Year	Population
1973 (Census)	28,546
1983 (Census)	42,803
1993 (Census)	72,187
2007 (Estimate)	143,059

== Notable people ==
- Nasra bint ʿAdlan, Sudanese royalty

== See also ==
- Railway stations in Sudan
