= Abd al-Qadir II =

Abd al-Qadir II was a ruler of the Kingdom of Sennar (1603/4 - 1606). According to James Bruce, he was the son of Unsa I, whom Bruce describes as "a weak and ill-inclined man". While he was ruler of Sennar, Emperor Susenyos of Ethiopia sent to Abd al-Qadir a nagarit, or kettle-drum, richly decorated with gold, which was one of the traditional emblems of an Ethiopian negus or king; in return, Abd al-Qadir sent Susenyos a trained hunting falcon. Shortly after this diplomatic exchange, he was deposed by his brother Adlan.

At some point following his deposition from the throne in 1606, Emperor Susenyos of Ethiopia appointed him governor of Chilga (also known as Ayikel), an important market town near the Ethiopian border with Sennar.

Preceded by Unsa I	King of Sennar	Succeeded by Adlan I
