= Arbaji =

Town in Sudan

Arbagi, (or Arbaji), formerly Hellet Amara, is a town in Al Jazirah State in Sudan. It lies opposite Rufaa on the left bank of the Blue Nile, 84.5 miles by road and 95 miles by river from Khartoum. There are several villages in the angle of the river which, however, are so close to one another that they may be considered as one. The town of Arbagi includes the site of the ancient city of Arbagi which is one of the oldest sites in the Sudan, and is mentioned by the learned Ludolphus in his history of Abyssinia. It was destroyed by the Shukria early in the 19th or at the end of 18th century.

The population of Arbagi is chiefly sawarda Mahasis/Ja'alin, Danagla and Batahin. At the turn of the twentieth century, Arbagi was under the Omda El Sheikh Ali Taha, who was succeeded by his son Omda Mohammed Ali Taha and finally Omda Abdel Majeed Ali Taha.

During the British colonial era, Arbagi was the headquarters of the Mesellemia District of Jazirah (Gezira) Province and residence of a British inspector, Mamur, police officer.
