= List of sultans of Darfur =

Sultan of Darfur
- سلطان دارفور
- State

Incumbent
- None
- Last to reign: Ali Dinar; September 1898 – 6 November 1916

Details
- First monarch: Sulayman Solong
- Last monarch: Ali Dinar
- Formed: 1603
- Abolished: 6 November 1916
- Residences: Turra; Various (before 1790); al-Fashir (after 1790)
- Appointer: Hereditary

This is a list of sultans of the Sultanate of Darfur. They belonged to the Keira dynasty.

== List ==
The names and dates are taken from John Stewart's African States and Rulers:

=== Sultans of Darfur ===
Name	Reign	Duration
Sulayman Solong	1603–1637	34 years
Musa ibn Sulayman	1637–1682	45 years
Ahmad Bakr ibn Musa	1682–1722	40 years
Muhammad I Dawra	1722–1732	10 years
Umar Lele	1732–1739	7 years
Abu al-Qasim	1739–1756	17 years
Muhammad II Tayrab	1756–1787	31 years
Abd ar-Rahman ar-Rashid	1787–1801	14 years
Muhammad III al-Fadhl	1801–1839	38 years
Muhammad IV Husayn	1839–1873	34 years
Ibrahim	1873 – 24 October 1874	c. 1 year

The title of sultan was abolished in 1874, following the conquest of Darfur and the region's incorporation into Turco-Egyptian Sudan.

=== Governors of Darfur ===
Portrait	Name	Tenure	Duration
	Hassan Bey Hilmi	24 October 1874 – 1881	c. 7 years
	Rudolf Karl Slatin	1881 – December 1883	c. 2 years

The title of sultan was re-established in 1898 during the Mahdist War.

=== Sultan of Darfur ===
Name	Reign	Duration
Ali Dinar	September 1898 – 6 November 1916	18 years, 2 months

The title of sultan was finally abolished in 1916 following the invasion of Darfur and the region's incorporation into Anglo-Egyptian Sudan.
