= Muhammad Tayrab =

Darfurian sultan

Muhammad Tayrab (r. c. 1753 – c. 1785) was a sultan of Darfur. During his reign, Tayrab pivoted the sultanate to the east and conquered Kordofan, reaching the Nile and sending Darfur into its apogee. The son of Sultan Ahmad Bukr and an elite Zaghawa, he appointed some Zaghawa relatives to office, reducing his reliance on the Fur. Tayrab was faced with rebellions by the Birged and the Tunjur (both of whom he defeated), as well as by the Rizayqat (with whom he reached a stalemate). Around 1785, after the Funj had withdrawn, the elderly Tayrab invaded and conquered Kordofan. Afterwards, aware that he was dying, Tayrab tried to secure the throne for his son Ishaq; this failed to happen: after Tayrab's death, Ishaq was defeated and killed in a civil war, and 'Abu al-Rahman usurped the throne for himself.

In his 2008 monograph, historian Rex O'Fahey described him as "perhaps the greatest of the Keira [dynasty] sultans".

== Biography ==
Tayrab was the son of Sultan Ahmad Bukr and Kaltuma, a Zaghawa Kobe of the ruling Angu clan. He came to power around 1753, after his brother Abu'l-Qasim was deserted on the battlefield during a war against Wadai after having attempted to reduce his reliance on other members of the Keira (Darfur's ruling family) and the Fur. Unbeknown to the Fur, Abu'l-Qasim had survived the battle, and he returned to Darfur; Tayrab wished to abdicate, but the title-holders instead chose to execute Abu'l-Qasim. O'Fahey wrote that it is unclear why title-holders chose Tayrab to succeed his brother, because of his Zaghawa heritage; during Tayrab's reign he appointed some of his Zaghawa relatives to stately titles, including making his uncle Sultan of Kobe and his nephew the main intermediary in his fashirs (itinerant courts) between him and his subjects.

Tayrab initially had his main fashir at Shoba (near Kabkabiya) where he commissioned a redbrick palace complex and mosque. With Wadai having proven to be too formidable, Tayrab pivoted the sultanate away from the west, to Kordofan and the Musabba'at (an exiled faction of the Keira) in the east. Around 1770 he moved his main fashir to Ril (where Abu'l-Qasim had defeated the Musabba'at), near Nyala. Unlike the west, Kordofan consisted of expansive savanna and had no natural boundaries save for the Nuba mountains. During the second half of Tayrab's reign, all of his capitals were east of the Jebel Marra. The Birged in southeastern Darfur entered into rebellion, reportedly because they considered Tayrab to be selling Birged girls (sent in tribute) into slavery. Tayrab subsequently suppressed the uprising, and consolidated their lands under the rule of his own candidates while disenfranchising the chiefly families. As a trophy, he cut off the chief's beard and displayed it in his house. Tayrab also strengthened his authority over the Beigo in the southeast and the Berti in the northeast, and unsuccessfully campaigned to subdue the Rizayqat nomads, who just migrated further south to Dinka lands. Also during Tayrab's reign, the Tunjur sultan, al-Mur, instigated a major revolt which was suppressed.

In 1782 the Funj Sultanate conquered Kordofan from Hashim of the Musabba'at, who, together with his followers (which included the Danaqla, Shaiqiyya, Kababish, and Rizayqat), began raiding Darfur, which in turn engaged in counter-raids. Around 1785 the Funj withdrew from Kordofan amid a civil war, and an elderly Tayrab launched an invasion, causing Hashim to flee eastwards to the Shaiqiyya. Tayrab conquered all the way up to the Nile near Shendi (making Darfur larger than modern-day Nigeria), however by that point his forces were exhausted war. They retired to Bara, where Tayrab soon died. Aware he was dying and fearing an internecine succession conflict, Tayrab reportedly wrote to his son Ishaq to travel to Bara and leave Ishaq's son, Khalil, in charge of Darfur. Just before his death, Tayrab convened the title-holders and they swore to carry out his wishes, including to hand over the army to Ishaq. This however did not happen, and Ishaq was defeated and killed in the civil war that followed which saw 'Abu al-Rahman become Darfur's sultan, who reportedly distributed Tayrab's former wives and possessions among his supporters.

== Legacy ==
In keeping with tradition for Darfurian sultans, Tayrab was buried at Turra. In his 2008 monograph, O'Fahey described him as "perhaps the greatest of the Keira [dynasty] sultans".
