= Sultanate of Darfur =

Former state in north-east Africa

Sultanate of Darfur سلطنة دارفور (Arabic) Salṭanat Dārfūr
- mid-16th century–1874 1898–1916
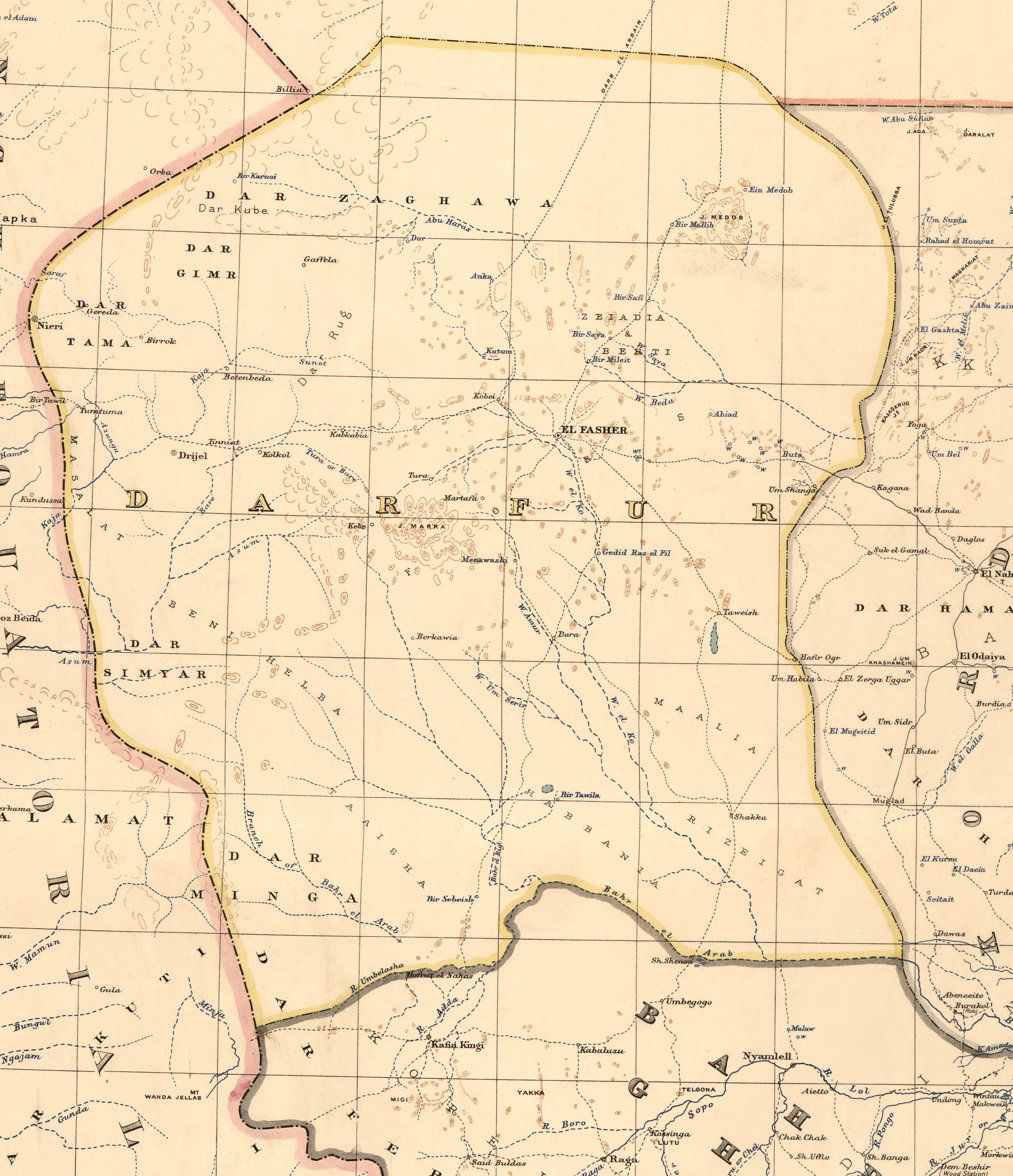
- Map of Darfur in 1914.
- Capital: Turra; Various (before 1790) al-Fashir (after 1790)
- Common languages: Fur, Arabic
- Religion: Sunni Islam
- Demonym: Dafurian
- Government: Monarchy
- Sultan
  - mid-16th century: Daali
  - 17th century: Sulayman Solong
  - 1898–1916: Ali Dinar
- History
  - Established: mid-16th century
  - Conquest of Kordofan: c. 1785
  - Conquered by Al-Zubayr Rahma Mansur: 1874
  - Independence from the Mahdist State: 1898
  - Invasion of Darfur: 1916
Preceded by	Succeeded by
Tunjur kingdom	Turco-Egyptian Sudan; Anglo-Egyptian Sudan
- Today part of: Sudan

The Sultanate of Darfur (Arabic: سلطنة دارفور, romanized: Salṭanat Dārfūr) was a pre-colonial state in present-day Sudan. It existed from the 16th century to 1874, when it fell to the Sudanese warlord Al-Zubayr Rahma Mansur, and was re-established again from 1898 to 1916, until it was conquered by the British. At its peak in the late-18th and early-19th century it stretched all the way from Darfur in the west to Kordofan and the western banks of the White Nile in the east.

== Geography ==
The region of Darfur is part of the wider bioregion of Sudanian savanna that forms an east–west belt across Africa, situated to the south of the Sahel and Sahara. Central Darfur features the Jebel Marra, a 70-mile-long (110 km) volcanic range that reaches around 10,000 ft (3,000 m) in height. There are typically large distances between areas of fertile land and therefore population centres. The environment is hot and dusty, and rains often fail. Though drought and famine were likely always a major concern, population growth through the 20th century contributed significantly to desertification and environmental degradation, and the climatic history of the region is poorly understood. In western Darfur (the sultanate's heartland), the northern parts are suitable for pastoralism, while the southern parts (the Fur homeland) are much more fertile and can support agriculture.

== History ==
=== Origins ===
Tunjur oral traditions say that the founder of the Tunjur kingdom in Darfur, Ahmad al-Ma'qur, had two sons called Ahmad Kanjar and Musa; Kanjar accordingly succeeded his father in Darfur and was the founder of the Kunjaara dynasty, while Musa went to Wadai and subjugated the region with the assistance of the Mahamid Arabs. Most traditions emphasise that the Tunjur and Fur were kin of some sort. The final Tunjur king was reportedly Shaw Dorshid (lit. 'the master over us') who ruled as a tyrant (thought to have been around the mid-16th century), leading his nobility to ask his half-brother, Daali or Dalil Bahr, to usurp the kingship, after which Shaw Dorshid is said to have fled to the Jebel Marra on a white horse or antelope (a common motif). Other versions say that Daali was a eunuch at the Tunjur capital of Uri. McGregor wrote that many of the early heroes in tradition were later Islamised to strengthen the dynasty's legitimacy.

Based in Turra in the northern Jebel Marra, Daali is said to have founded several important institutions of the Keira state, namely the sacred tree (numang fadda), the five provinces upon which the state's administration would be based until the 19th century, and the codification of Keira customary law in the Kitab Daali. Arkell considered the latter to be "an attempt to reconcile" customary/sultanic law with a Maliki interpretation of Sharia law. There are also ruins at Turra called tong daali ("Daali's palace"). Following Daali's reign, a lengthy period of conflict is said to have ensued (shown by his successors' palaces being of poorer quality than his own), involving 10 short reigns. The early monarchs were divine kings, likely based in Fur and Tunjur traditions.

During the reign of Kuuruu, a major schism is said to have taken place among the Keira after he reportedly fought his brother Tunsam over land in Dar Fia (west of Jebel Marra), causing Kuuruu to flee with his son Sulayman to Dar Masalit. Having grown up among the Masalit (to whom his mother belonged), Sulayman is then said to have returned to Jebel Marra to seize power back from Tunsam, who fled with his followers to Kordofan where they became known as the Musabba'at ("the people of the east"). Both Kuuruu and Sulayman have ruins at Turra associated with them. O'Fahey wrote that the conflict between Kuuruu and Tunsam may have signalled the collapse of the Tunjur empire, while McGregor said that the conflict may have been over conversion to Islam with the Keira as early adherents, based on Sulayman making Islam the state religion and becoming the first sultan. Traditions consider Daali to be the founder of the Keira state and Sulayman (generations later) as the second founder.

=== Expansion ===
According to Nachtigal's recordation, Sulayman reigned from 1596–1637, however O'Fahey considered it to have been from c. 1660 to c. 1680. He was called Sulayman Solungdungo ("Sulayman the Arab/red"), either because of his skin colour or his purported descent from Ahmad al-Ma'qur. Sulayman is credited as a warrior who expanded the state to encompass the Masalit, Orra/Qimr, and Mararit in the west, the Zaghawa in the north, and the Birged, Beigo, and Tunjur in the south and east. This expansion saw the tribal positions of lineage chiefs, ritual leaders, and war leaders become hereditary title holders, upon whom the ruler depended for support. O'Fahey wrote that Sulayman likely sought to increase the territory from which he could gain goods such as slaves to trade for weaponry, war-horses, and cloth among other goods, some of which could then be distributed among his subjects. Sulayman is said to have made Islam the state cult and to have built mosques, although the spread of Islam among the population was very slow. He was succeeded by his son, Musa, who likely had a short reign. Prior to Musa's reign, Wadai paid tribute to Darfur as a legacy from the Tunjur empire; Sultan Ya'qub refused to pay and invaded Darfur, reaching just south of Wadi Barei, however disputes within his army forced a retreat. Musa is reported to have ineffectively fought the Qimr, and to have defeated the Musabba'at at their ruler's fashirs (itinerant courts) in Tina and Kolge. Both Sulayman and Musa were buried at Turra.

Joerg Adelberger considered the "Keira" to originally be one of the Fur descent-groups (orrenga), which grew dominant and gradually incorporated others (generically called Fartit). It was common for the Keira dynasty to intermarry with other ethnic groups as the region was very ethnically diverse, and the royal family was open to integrating strangers into the elite. Over the course of its existence, the expansion of the state was often done via integration and assimilation rather than by war. While the Keira dynasty claimed an Arab lineage (in the Sudan the concept of "Arabism" was more fluid and could be applied to any who were culturally Arabised and spoke Arabic regardless of skin colour), it was likely intermarriages with Arabs from the Nile Valley and interactions with their holy men and merchants from the east and north which brought about the conversion of the royal court to Islam. Muslims making the hajj (pilgrimage to Mecca) often passed through Darfur, and settlement by West Africans could have also played a role. Most Fur commoners continued to follow their traditional religion.

From the 17th century, the trans-Saharan trade route Darb El Arba'īn ("Forty Days Road") became busier, linking Kobbei to Asyut. The prosperity the sultanate enjoyed was largely down to the extensive trading relations and contacts they cultivated over the centuries. The sultan himself commissioned slave raids due to only the national army being strong enough, particularly into the land of the Baggara Arabs to the south, and profited greatly. While the state expanded north beyond the Jebal Marra mountains, they struggled to conquer the Baggara Arabs, and instead forged socio-economic relations with them. During the 17th century, the Keira sultans introduced the feudal hakura system into Darfur.

Musa was meant to have been succeeded by his eldest son, Giggeri, however he had a seizure on his first day and was perceived as being "possessed by the devil", leading Musa's youngest son, Ahmad Bukr, to ascend to the kingship instead. Giggeri revolted and forced Bukr to flee to the southwest, however he soon returned and killed his brother to regain the kingship. During Bukr's reign, several holy men from the west and east were enticed to settle in Darfur, including one from Futa Tooro and another who was a pupil of the Awlad Jabir (a renowned Islamic scholarly family in the Nilotic Sudan). Wadai sultan Ya'qub invaded Darfur again during Bukr's reign, reaching Kabkabiya, until Bukr managed to obtain weaponry from Egypt and defeat them.

=== Civil war among the sons of Bukr and conflict with Wadai ===
On his deathbed c. 1720, Bukr reportedly made title-holders swear an oath that his sons were to succeed him and that the kingship were to pass from brother to brother, such that a grandson was not permitted to succeed while he had a living uncle. Over the following decades, internal conflict ensued between the incumbent sultan at any one time, who wanted to consolidate power and privilege their own lineage, and others of Bukr's lineage. One of Bukr's sons, Dawra (meaning "iron-hearted"; also called "Harut"), served as co-ruler during his lifetime and succeeded him. Dawra reportedly killed many of his brothers throughout his reign, and tradition remembers him as a callous ruler. Despite naming one of his sons, Musa 'Anqarib, as his successor, Dawra later favoured another son called 'Umar Lel ("the donkey", possibly due to his patience), provoking Musa to revolt. Musa was able to defeat his father near El Fasher, but at a mediation summit organised by holy men Dawra beat his son to death. Dawra is reported to have eventually died at his palace in Majalla of leprosy.

'Umar Lel succeeded his father c. 1730, but faced tensions with his uncles. He also sought to strengthen Islamic rule which brought him into conflict with the titleholders, with one tradition saying that he had 30 leading chiefs executed after claims of oppression. Lel saw off challenges to his rule from the Musabba'at in Kordofan, but a more perilous challenge began materialising from the west. After uncovering a plot by his uncles and the Wadai sultan to overthrow him, Lel invaded Wadai with two armies led by titleholders. One of his armies was repelled while the other saw success; Lel and Wadai's sultan joined their armies for the final battle (thought to be c. 1739), in which Lel was captured after his army deserted him. Lel reportedly saw out his days reading the Quran in captivity at Abu Kundi where he was buried. Lel was succeeded by his uncle, Abu'l-Qasim, who traditions portray as a capable ruler. Abu'l-Qasim attempted to reduce his reliance on other Keira and the Fur by incorporating slave soldiers into the army, and he appointed a Zaghawa as his Wazir, angering the Fur. In 1753 Abu'l-Qasim decisively prevented 'Isawi of the Musabba'at from interfering in Darfur's politics. During his reign, war again broke out with Wadai, during which he introduced a tax of one head of cattle per household. Abu'l-Qasim also placed his slave soldiers and his Wazir's forces a rank above the Fur, causing them to desert him on the battlefield c. 1750s; the Fur only came back to fight to prevent the Wadai from taking the sacred drum (al-mansura).

Muhammad Tayrab was chosen to succeed his brother as sultan, however Abu'l-Qasim had survived the battle, aided by a Mahamid Arab, and returned to Darfur. Tayrab wished to abdicate but the title-holders instead had Abu'l-Qasim executed. O'Fahey wrote that it is unclear why Tayrab, who had a Zaghawa mother and went on to appoint his Zaghawa relatives to office, was chosen as Abu'l-Qasim's successor.

=== Tayrab's reign and the conquest of Kordofan ===
With Wadai proving too formidable, Tayrab and the sultanate pivoted away from the west, to Kordofan and the Musabba'at in the east. Unlike the west, Kordofan consisted of expansive savanna and had no natural boundaries save for the Nuba mountains. Tayrab initially had his main fashir at Shoba, but during the second half of his reign, all the sultanate's capitals were east of the Jebel Marra. The Birged in southeastern Darfur entered into rebellion, reportedly because they considered Tayrab to be selling Birged girls (sent in tribute) into slavery, which Tayrab subsequently suppressed, and he consolidated their lands under the rule of his own candidates while disenfranchising the chiefly families. He also strengthened his authority over the Beigo in the southeast and the Berti in the northeast, and unsuccessfully campaigned to subdue the Rizayqat nomads, who just migrated further south to Dinka lands.

Over the previous centuries Kordofan had largely escaped control by any of the region's major states, however the Funj Sultanate centred in Sennar projected influence over eastern Kordofan via the Ghudiyat. In 1734 Isawi of the Musabba'at had dislodged the Ghudiyat administration and repelled subsequent Funj attempts to regain their foothold Kordofan, but after Isawi's death Kordofan was conquered by Abu Likaylik during his rise to power in Sennar. Around 1772 Hashim of the Musabba'at led an insurgency which retook control of Kordofan from the aging Likaylik, whose successor in Sennar abandoned attempts to recapture it. Hashim began building a state in central Kordofan, but in 1782 the Funj (under Likaylik's son) ousted him, and together with his followers (which included the Danaqla, Shaiqiyya, Kababish, and Rizayqat) they began raiding Darfur, which engaged in counter-raids.

Around 1785 the Funj withdrew from Kordofan amid a civil war, and the elderly Tayrab launched an invasion, causing Hashim to flee eastwards to the Shaiqiyya. He conquered all the way up to the Nile near Shendi (making Darfur larger than modern-day Nigeria), however by that point his forces were exhausted by war. They retired to Bara, where Tayrab soon died.

=== Succession crisis and the rise of Kurra ===
Sultan 'Abd al-Rahman hosting William George Browne during his stay in Darfur between 1793–1796. Jules Verne, 1880.

Aware he was dying, Tayrab reportedly wrote to his son Ishaq to travel to Bara and leave Ishaq's son, Khalil, in charge of Darfur. However news of Tayrab's decline in health permeated the camp, and a royal eunuch called Muhammad Kurra consulted the iiya baasi ("favourite sister"), Kinana, in the harem. Kinana wished for her son to succeed, but Kurra viewed 'Abd al-Rahman (a son of Bukr) as more feasible due to his underprivileged and modest background as a childless orphan (inhibiting the creation of new lineages). 'Abd al-Rahman agreed to make Kurra abbo shaykh daali (the most powerful slave title) in exchange for his and Kinana's support.

Arabic letter of Sultan 'Abd al-Rahman to Napoleon, c. 1800

Just before Tayrab's death, he convened the title-holders and they swore to carry out his wishes, including for 'Ali bin Jami (Kurra's master) to hand over the army to Ishaq. The Awlad Bukr (Bukr's lineage) opposed this; 'Ali bin Jami ordered Kurra to tell his son to assemble the army near the royal camp, however Kurra secretly told him to assemble them by the Awlad Bukr's camp, causing 'Ali bin Jami to kill himself over the betrayal. Two factions were realised in Bara: the Awlad Bukr, and the sons of prior sultans (a third coalesced around Ishaq, who was still in Darfur). The fakirs and ulama mediated the dispute, and the title-holders and army settled on 'Abd al-Rahman. A three-year-long civil war followed between 'Abd al-Rahman and Ishaq throughout eastern Darfur (effectively being a conflict between Tayrab's generation, which was more associated with the Zaghawa, and that of Ahmad Bukr, more associated with the Fur). 'Abd al-Rahman's won the first battle at Tabaldiyya (northeast of Nyala), and during the next battle at Taldawa Ishaq's commander defected. The final battle near "Jarku" (c. 1788) saw 'Abd al-Rahman victorious as Ishaq later succumbed to his wounds.

Sultan 'Abd al-Rahman oversaw the sultanate's apogee and established a new capital at al-Fashir (meaning "the capital") in 1792. By the end of the 18th century, most of the population had syncretised Islam with their traditional beliefs. 'Abd al-Rahman planned for his son, Muhammad al-Fadl, to succeed him, with Kurra tasked with carrying out his wish; after the sultan's death, Kurra solicited support from the title-holders for the 14-year-old al-Fadl, however they faced opposition from sons of former sultans, who joined forces and marched on al-Fashir. Kurra deployed an army led by a Keira warlord, which decisively defeated the enemy, with 60 princes executed outside al-Fashir. (Note: The field where this occurred is now known as qoz al-sittin (lit. 'the field of sixty').) With his position secure, al-Fadl exempted his mother's people, the Beigo, from having to send slaves in tribute, however true power rested in the hands of his slave, Kurra, who ruled autocratically for several years. Opposition to Kurra came gravitated to al-Fadl, with this climaxing in 1804; with al-Fadl's faction controlling the settlement's water source, Kurra was forced to withdraw. Kurra's forces twice defeated those of the state, however his candidate for sultan died in battle. Despite attempts to rally support from the Awlad Bukr, Kurra's supporters deserted him and he was killed in battle the next day, securing al-Fadl's rule.

=== Decline ===
In 1821, the Turco-Egyptians under Muhammad Ali, who planned to conquer the Sudan and compile a large slave army, conquered the Funj and the province of Kordofan from al-Fadl. The Keira dispatched another army but it was routed by the Egyptians near Bara on 19 August 1821. The Turco-Egyptians had intended to conquer all of Darfur, but their difficulties consolidating their hold on the Nile region forced them to abandon these plans.

The emergence of a more powerful eastern neighbour threatened the sultanate's political dominance over the region, and its greater military strength inhibited their procurement of slaves, crucial to the sultanate's economy. North-south trade routes began to bypass Darfur via Egypt, causing the sultanate to enter a recession.

Girl from Darfur. Pierre Trémaux, 1858

Al-Fadl died in 1838 and of his forty sons, the third, Muhammad al-Husayn, was appointed his successor. Al-Husayn is described as a religious but avaricious man. In 1856 he went blind and for the rest of his reign Zamzam Umm al-Nasr, the sultan's eldest sister or ayabasi, was the de facto ruler of the sultanate. Zamzam and other members of the sultan's inner circle exploited his weakness to repossess and pillage large tracts of land, terrorizing the citizens and weakening the sultanate.

In 1856, a Khartoum businessman, al-Zubayr Rahma, began operations in the land south of Darfur. He set up a network of trading posts defended by well-armed forces and soon had a sprawling state under his rule. This area, known as the Bahr el Ghazal, had long been the source of the goods that Darfur would trade to Egypt and North Africa, especially slaves and ivory. The natives of Bahr el Ghazal paid tribute to Darfur, and these were the chief articles of merchandise sold by the Darfurians to the Egyptian traders along the road to Asyut. Al-Zubayr redirected this flow of goods to Khartoum and the Nile.

=== Turco-Egyptian rule ===
Sultan al-Husayn died in 1873 and the succession passed to his youngest son Ibrahim, who soon found himself engaged in a conflict with al-Zubayr. After earlier conflicts with the Turco-Egyptians, Al-Zubayr had become their ally and in cooperation with them agreed to conquer Darfur. The war resulted in the destruction of the kingdom. Ibrahim was slain in the Battle of al-Manawashi in the autumn of 1874, and his uncle Hassab Alla, who sought to maintain the independence of his country, was captured in 1875 by the troops of the khedive, and brought to Cairo with his family. Al-Zubayr was shortly recalled by the Turco-Egyptians, and Darfur was administered as a province. Numerous rebellions sought to restore the sultanate, which enjoyed popular support, however they were unsuccessful.

=== Mahdists, Ali Dinar, and colonisation ===
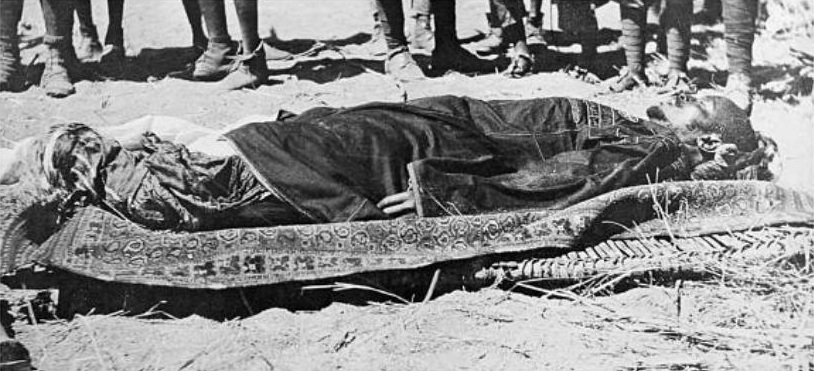
The body of Ali Dinar

In the 1880s, the Mahdists launched a jihad against the Turco-Egyptians. In 1885 they conquered Darfur and destroyed Khartoum, ending Turco-Egyptian rule. Although the regime change was initially popular, the Fur soon fiercely resisted Mahdist rule, and in 1887 a rebellion by the son of Sultan Ibrahim was narrowly put down. Another rebellion commenced soon after led by Abu Jammayza, a faki, and was only put down after his death from smallpox in 1889. Rebellions sought to expel foreign occupiers and return the traditional sultans.

In 1898, when the Mahdists were conquered by the Anglo-Egyptians, sultan Ali Dinar managed to re-establish Darfur's self-rule. Ali Dinar's rule was recognised and tolerated by the British, and he rebuilt the sultanate's institutions. Dinar interfered in Wadai's succession struggle and placed his candidate on the throne, however he was assassinated and replaced by Dud Murra, the Senussi's candidate. Dinar contested the French conquests of his western tributaries, and the French and British convened to compose borders, however this was halted by the outbreak of World War 1. Dinar reassured the British he wouldn't ally with the Islamic Ottomans, however the British began to see the status quo as untenable. The British campaign in Turkey ended and troops became available in Egypt. Amid the possibility of French expansion and rumours of Dinar preparing an attack, the British conquered Darfur in 1916 and Dinar was killed in battle. The kingdom was incorporated into the Anglo-Egyptian Condominium in 1917.

== Government ==
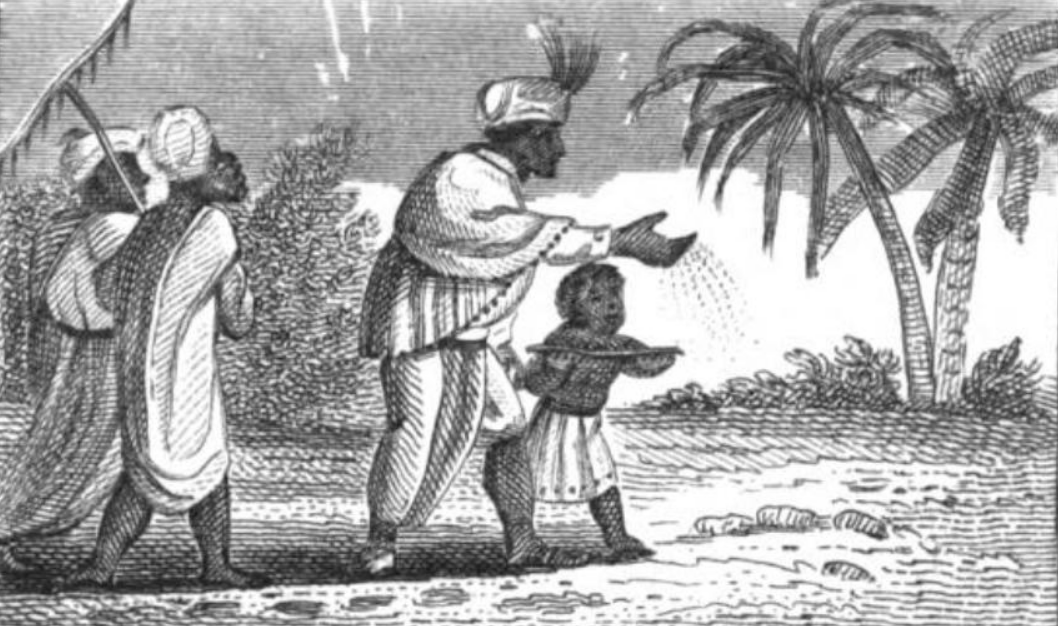
"The King of Darfur planting Corn" by Isaac H. Taylor, 1820

The state was headed by a sultan. Early monarchs were divine kings (an institution that was possibly inherited from the Tunjur), with Islam only transforming this rather than replacing it. Monarchs were effectively primus inter pares due to their reliance on local loyalties, until the lengthy civil war in the 18th century permitted centralisation of power in the sultan and the establishment of new institutions. Middle-ranking chiefs were titled shartay (derived from the Daju title chorte). There is some evidence of ritual regicide in the 18th century.

The administration of the state was based on the provinces reportedly founded by Daali: Dar daali (east), Dar aba uumo (southeast), Dar aba diima (southwest), Dar al-Takanyawi (north), and Dar al-gharb (west), though according to O'Fahey the latter was likely established later, meaning the provincial organisation may have been inspired by Kanem–Bornu's quadrants (or just inherited from the Tunjur). Despite the state's sultanic law changing over the centuries, it was predominantly enforced by fines paid in livestock or takkiyya (pieces of cloth), though 'blood-compensation' (diyya) came to be used for cases of injury or death.

== Economy ==
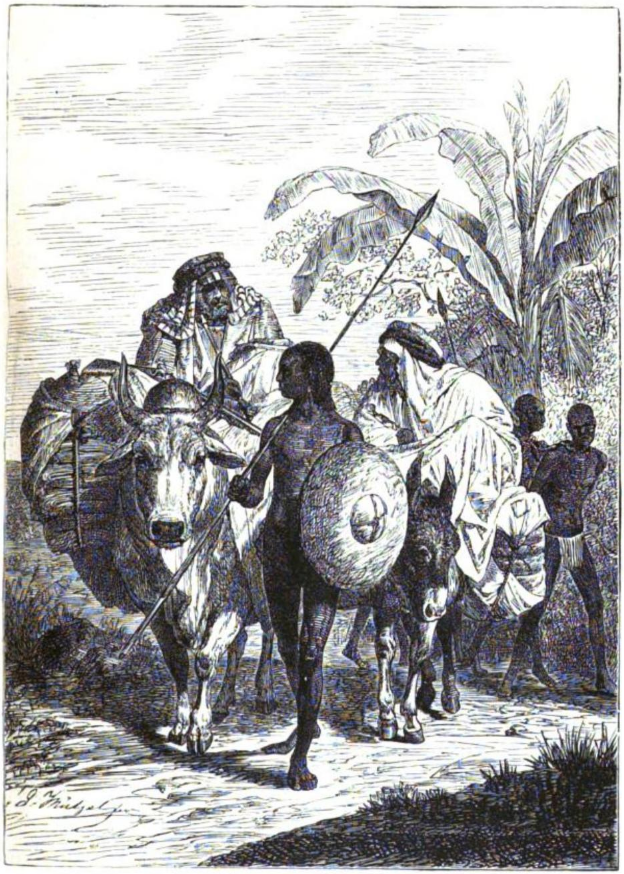
Slave traders from Darfur, c. 1870

Darfur's harsh environment and varying levels of rainfall saw it divided into three loosely-defined economic zones, corresponding to rain-fed hoe agriculture, cattle nomadism, and camel nomadism. Ethnic terms often corresponded to lifestyles, such that a successful Fur farmer in the east who accumulated cattle was incentivised to become a cattle nomad (due to the cattle's impact on their fields) and from then on belong to the Baqqara, while in the west Fur farmers could become camel nomads and belong to the Zaghawa, with the loss of herds in natural disaster or war conversely forcing nomads to become sedentary farmers.

== Society and culture ==
A mahmal from Darfur passing through Omdurman, 1904

Like elsewhere, ethnicity in Darfur was ill-defined and much more fluid than modern conceptualisations. Terms used included jabalawiyyin (to refer to "mountain dwellers"), hajaray (to pejoratively refer to enslaveable peoples), and fartit (to refer to peoples to the south). The Fur were (and are) divided into loosely-defined orrenga, which were patrilineal descent-groups (though people considered themselves related to both of their parents' groups). Bridewealth and inheritance passed on bilaterally, and endogamy within descent-groups was very common. Between the 15th and 17th centuries, Arab nomads (likely belonging to a large Fazara federation in Upper Egypt) gradually migrated into northern and southern Darfur. The concept of Arab identity within the state was very fluid and ill-defined, though the Jebel Marra inhibited the spread of Arabisation from east to west. West African Muslims frequently travelled through Darfur during their pilgrimage to Mecca, and sometimes settled within the state (whether abandoning their journey or on the return leg), with holy men and Islamic scholars often being given incentives of land and positions from the sultans.

== Warfare ==
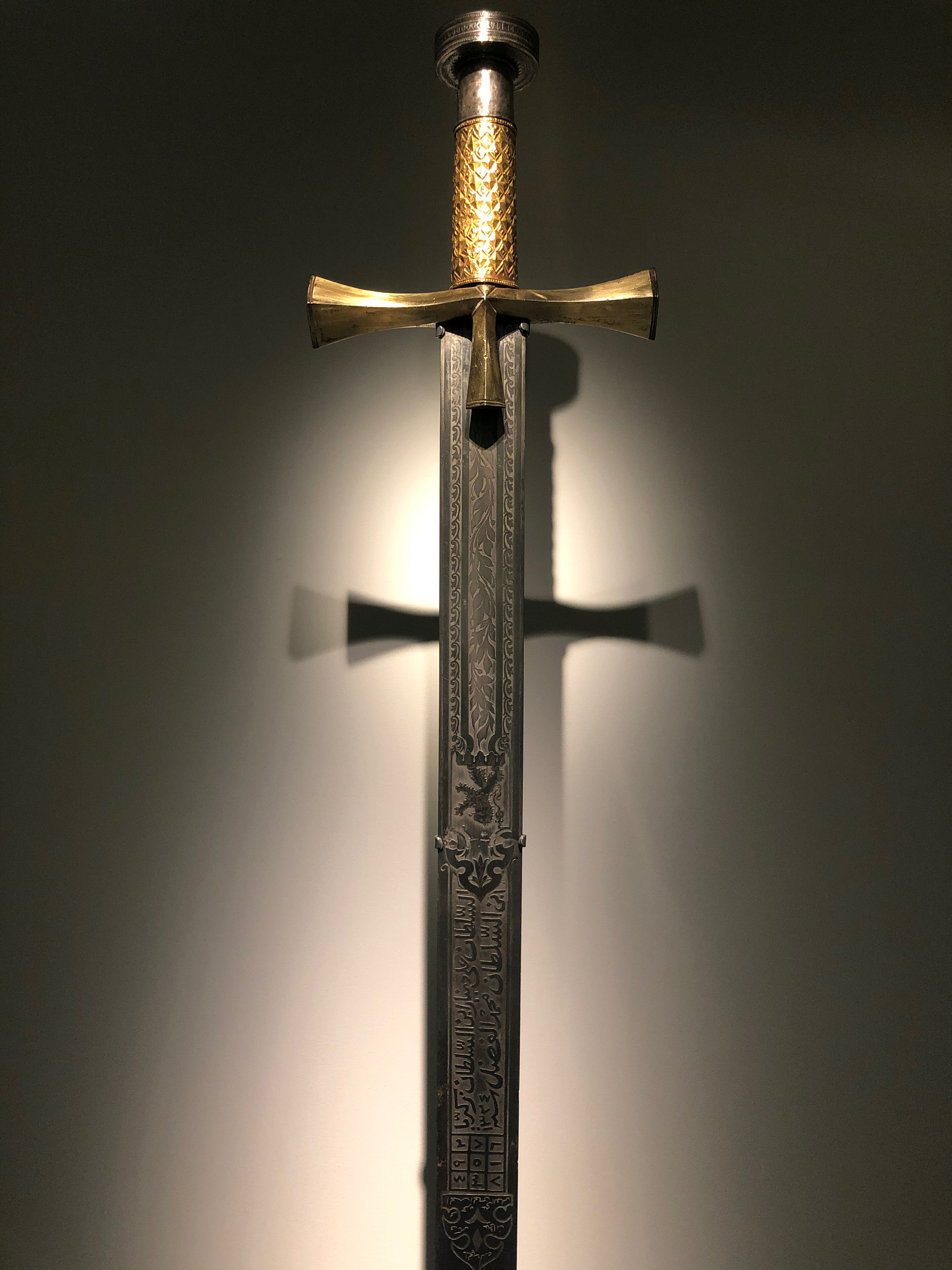
The kaskara of Ali Dinar, British Museum.

The armies of Darfur underwent a three-staged evolution. Before the 18th century they consisted entirely of levy warbands, youths armed with spears, hide shields and occasionally throwing knives. They were commanded by an older man titled ornang or 'aqid. By the 18th century, a new type of warrior developed, the heavily armoured fursan. They would form the small core of the armies of Darfur. These fursan were armed with long swords (kaskara) imported from Solingen in Germany, lances, maces and sometimes firearms. Body armour consisted of locally made gambesons, German-made mail armour, silk coats, greaves and helmets. The horses were a Nubian breed imported from the Dongola Reach and were purchased with slaves. Like the riders they were armoured with gambesons and mail armour as well as additional armour for the head. All this equipment had to be organized and maintained by the chiefs responsible for the fursan.

By the 1850s and 1860s, Darfur entered the third stage, when it attempted to build an army based on muskets. While firearms were already used in Darfur before it was only then when they were used tactically and in large numbers. These experiments were, however, ended with the invasion of al-Zubayr in 1874. Sultan Ibrahim died in a cavalry charge. The regular army of the revived state of Ali Dinar reportedly numbered 7,700 men in 1903 and 5,000 in 1916 and wielded a wide array of weapons, ranging from spears and shields to muzzle loaders, shotguns and Remington rifles.

Sultans and nobles were guarded by the korkwa, armed pages wielding spears and hide shields.

== Historiography ==
An account of life and the geography in Darfur was written in the early-19th century by Muḥammad al-Tūnisī (d. 1857), who spent ten years as a merchant from Cairo in the sultanate and described the kingdom in detail and with his own drawings in the book translated as In Darfur.

Colonial histories often portrayed the region as chaotic and barbaric, necessitating colonial rule to keep order, in contrast to the reality. Recent histories stress the co-operative and largely peaceful nature of coexistence in the region, however the colonial narrative has seen a resurgence due to the Darfur War.
