= Islamization of the Sudan region =

Spread of Islam after the Arab conquests

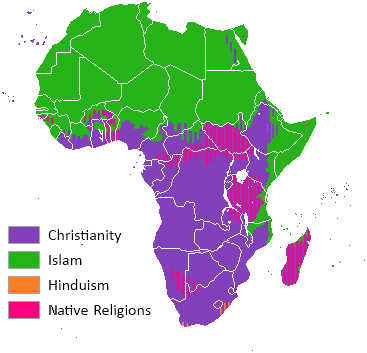
The geographic division between the majority religions of Islam and Christianity in contemporary Africa

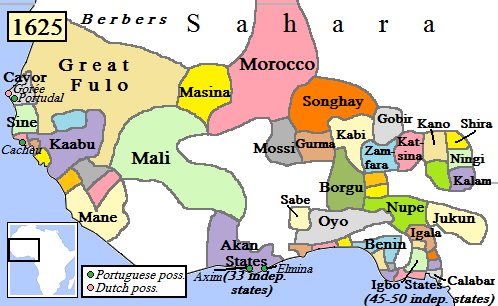
The western Sahel kingdoms in the 17th century

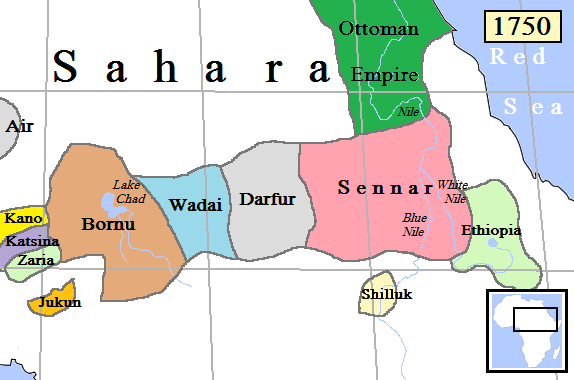
The central and eastern Sahel kingdoms in the 18th century

The Islamization of the Sudan region (Sahel) encompasses a prolonged period of religious conversion, through military conquest and trade relations, spanning the 8th to 16th centuries.

Following the 7th century Muslim conquest of Egypt and the 8th-century Muslim conquest of North Africa, Arab Muslims began leading trade expeditions into Sub-Saharan Africa, first towards Nubia, and later across the Sahara into West Africa. Much of this contact was motivated by an interest in trans-Saharan trade, particularly the slave trade.

The proliferation of Islamic influence was largely a gradual process. The Christian kingdoms of Nubia were the first to experience Arab incursion starting in the 7th century. They held out through the Middle Ages until the Kingdom of Makuria and Old Dongola both collapsed in the early 14th century. Sufi orders played a significant role in the spread of Islam from the 9th to 14th centuries, and they proselytized across trade routes between North Africa and the sub-Saharan kingdom of Mali. They were also responsible for setting up zawiyas on the shores of the River Niger.

The Mali Empire underwent a period of internally motivated conversion following the 1324 pilgrimage of Musa I of Mali. Subsequently Timbuktu became one of the most important Islamic cultural centers in the Sahara. Alodia, the last holdout of Christian Nubia, was destroyed by the Funj Sultanate in 1504. During the 19th century the Sanusi order was highly involved in missionary work with their missions focused on the spread of both Islam and textual literacy as far south as Lake Chad.

Consequently, much of the contemporary Sudan region is Muslim. This includes the Republic of Sudan (after the secession of Christian-majority South Sudan), the northern parts of Chad and Niger, most of Mali, Mauritania and Senegal. The problem of slavery in contemporary Africa remains especially pronounced in these countries, with severe divides between the Arabized population of the north and dark-skinned Africans in the south motivating much of the conflict, as these nations sustain the centuries-old pattern of hereditary servitude that arose following early Muslim conquests. Ethnic strife between Arabized and non-Arab black populations has led to various internal conflicts in the Sudan region, most notably the War in Darfur, the Northern Mali conflict, and the Islamist insurgency in Northern Nigeria.

== The Arabs ==
Contacts between Nubians and Arabs long predated the coming of Islam, but the Arabization of the Nile Valley was a gradual process that occurred over a period of nearly one thousand years. Arab nomads continually wandered into the region in search of fresh pasturage, and Arab seafarers and merchants traded at Red Sea ports for spices and slaves. Intermarriage and assimilation also facilitated Arabization. After the initial attempts at military conquest failed, the Arab commander in Egypt, Abd Allah ibn Saad, concluded the first in a series of regularly renewed treaties with the Nubians that governed relations between the two peoples for more than six hundred years with only brief interruptions. This treaty was known as the Baqt. Relations between Egypt and Nubia were peaceful whilst Egypt was under Arabian control with tensions arising whilst the Mamluks were in power in Egypt.

The Arabs realized the commercial advantages of peaceful relations with Nubia and used the Baqt to ensure that travel and trade proceeded unhindered across the frontier. The Baqt also contained security arrangements whereby both parties agreed that neither would come to the defense of the other in the event of an attack by a third party. The Baqt obliged both to exchange annual tribute as a goodwill symbol: the Nubians sent slaves and the Arabs sent grain. This formality was only a token of the trade that developed between the two. It was not only a trade in slaves and grain but also in horses and manufactured goods brought to Nubia by the Arabs, and in ivory, gold, gems, gum arabic, and cattle carried back by them to Egypt, or shipped to Arabia.

Acceptance of the Baqt did not indicate Nubian submission to the Arabs; however, the treaty did impose conditions for Arab friendship that eventually permitted Arabs to achieve a privileged position in Nubia. Arab merchants established markets in Nubian towns to facilitate the exchange of grain and slaves. Arab engineers supervised the operation of mines east of the Nile in which they used slave labor to extract gold and emeralds. Muslim pilgrims en route to Mecca traveled across the Red Sea on ferries from Aydhab and Suakin, ports that also received cargoes bound from India to Egypt.

Traditional genealogies trace the ancestry of the Nile Valley's mixed population to Arab tribes that migrated into the region during this period. Even many non-Arabic-speaking groups claim descent from Arab forebears. The two most important Arabic-speaking groups to emerge in Nubia were the Ja'alin and the Juhaynah. Both showed physical continuity with the indigenous pre-Islamic population. The former claimed descent from the Quraysh, the Prophet Muhammad's tribe. Historically, the Ja'ali have been involved in the slave trade, making up an important subsection of the nomadic, slave trading jallaba, along with other tribes such as the Danagla. The nomadic Juhayna comprised a family of tribes that included the Kababish, Baqqara, and Shukriya. They were descended from Arabs who migrated after the 13th century into an area that extended from the savanna and semi-desert west of the Nile to the Abyssinian foothills east of the Blue Nile. Both groups formed a series of tribal shaykhdoms that succeeded the crumbling Christian Nubian kingdoms, and were in frequent conflict with one another and with neighboring non-Arabs. In some instances, such as with the Beja, the indigenous people absorbed Arab migrants who settled among them. Beja ruling families later derived their legitimacy from their claims of Arab ancestry.

Although not all Muslims in the region were Arabic-speaking, acceptance of Islam facilitated the Arabization process. There was no policy of proselytism, however. Islam penetrated the area over a long period of time through intermarriage and contacts with Arab merchants and settlers.

== The Funj ==
At the same time that the Ottomans brought northern Nubia into their orbit, a new power, the Funj, had risen in southern Nubia and had supplanted the remnants of the old Christian Kingdom of Alodia. In 1504 a Funj leader, Amara Dunqas, founded the Kingdom of Sennar. This Sultanate eventually became the keystone of the Funj Empire. By the mid-sixteenth century, Sennar controlled Al Jazirah and commanded the allegiance of vassal states and tribal districts as far north as the third cataract of the nile and as far south as the rainforests.

The Funj state included a loose confederation of sultanates and dependent tribal chieftains drawn together under the suzerainty of Sennar's mek (sultan). As overlord, the mek received tribute, levied taxes, and called on his vassals to supply troops in times of war. Vassal states in turn relied on the mek to settle local disorders and to resolve internal disputes. The Funj stabilized the region and interposed a military bloc between the Arabs in the north, the Abyssinians in the east, and the non-Muslim blacks in the south.

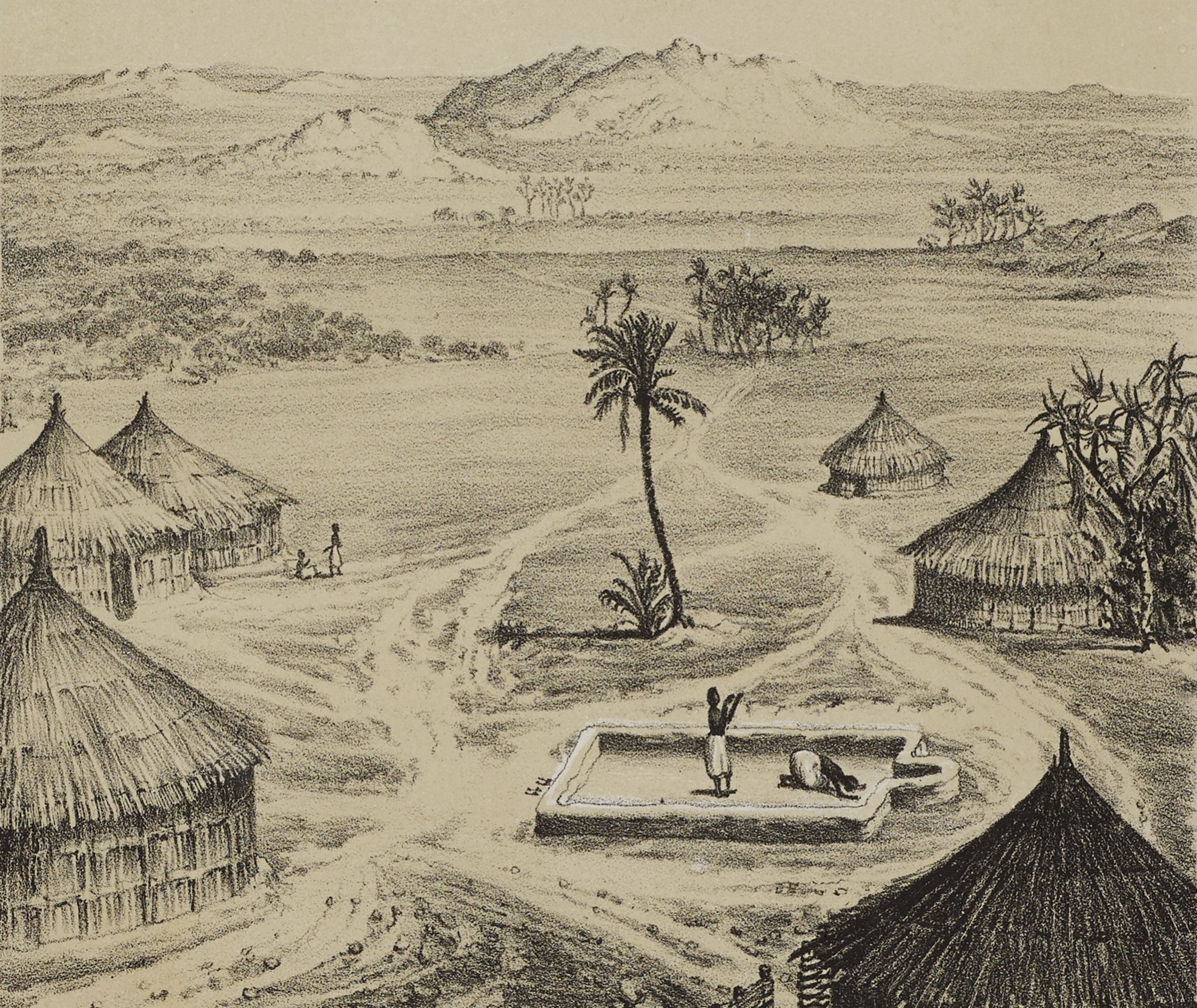
Simple village mosque in Upper Nubia, mid-19th century

The sultanate's economy depended on the role played by the Funj in the slave trade. Farming and herding also thrived in Al Jazirah and in the southern rainforests. Sennar apportioned tributary areas into tribal homelands each one termed a dar (pl., dur), where the mek granted the local population the right to use arable land. The diverse groups that inhabited each dar eventually regarded themselves as units of tribes. Movement from one dar to another entailed a change in tribal identification. (Tribal distinctions in these areas in modern Sudan can be traced to this period.) The mek appointed a chieftain (nazir; pl., nawazir) to govern each dar. Nawazir administered dur according to customary law, paid tribute to the mek, and collected taxes. The mek also derived income from crown lands set aside for his use in each dar.

At the peak of its power in the mid-17th century, Sennar repulsed the northward advance of the Nilotic Shilluk people up the White Nile and compelled many of them to submit to Funj authority. After this victory, the mek Badi II Abu Duqn (1642–81) sought to centralize the government of the confederacy of Sennar. To implement this policy, Badi introduced a standing army of slave soldiers that would free Sennar from dependence on vassal sultans for military assistance, and would provide the mek with the means to enforce his will. The move alienated the dynasty from the Funj warrior aristocracy which deposed the reigning mek, and placed one of their own ranks on the throne of Sennar in 1718. The mid-18th century witnessed another brief period of expansion when the Funj turned back an Abyssinian invasion, defeated the Fur, and took control of much of Kurdufan. But the civil war, and the demands of defending the sultanate, had overextended the warrior society's resources and sapped its strength.

Another reason for Sennar's decline may have been the growing influence of its hereditary viziers (chancellors), chiefs of a non-Funj tributary tribe who managed court affairs. In 1761, the vizier Muhammad Abu al Kaylak, who had led the Funj army in wars, carried out a palace coup, relegating the sultan to a figurehead role. Sennar's hold over its vassals diminished, and by the early 19th century, more remote areas ceased to recognize even the nominal authority of the mek.

== The Fur ==
Darfur was the Fur homeland. Renowned as cavalrymen, Fur clans frequently allied with, or opposed their kin, the Kanuri of Borno, in modern Nigeria. After a period of disorder in the sixteenth century, during which the region was briefly subject to the Bornu Empire, the leader of the Keira clan, Sulayman Solong (1596–1637), supplanted a rival clan and became Darfur's first sultan. Sulayman Solong decreed Islam to be the sultanate's official religion. However, large-scale religious conversions did not occur until the reign of Ahmad Bakr (1682–1722), who imported teachers, built mosques, and compelled his subjects to become Muslims. In the eighteenth century, several sultans consolidated the dynasty's hold on Darfur, established a capital at Al-Fashir, and contested the Funj for control of Kurdufan.

The sultans operated the slave trade as a monopoly. They levied taxes on traders, and export duties on slaves sent to Egypt, and took a share of the slaves brought into Darfur. Some household slaves advanced to prominent positions in the courts of sultans, and the power exercised by these slaves provoked a violent reaction among the traditional class of Fur officeholders in the late eighteenth century. The rivalry between the slave and traditional elites caused recurrent unrest throughout the next century.

== See also ==
- Muslim conquest of the Maghreb
- Muslim conquest of Egypt
- Sahelian kingdoms
- History of Sudan
- History of Chad
- History of Niger
- History of Mali
- History of Mauritania
- Kingdom of Sennar
- Islam in Ethiopia
- Islam in Somalia
