= Peshawari turban =

Type of turban

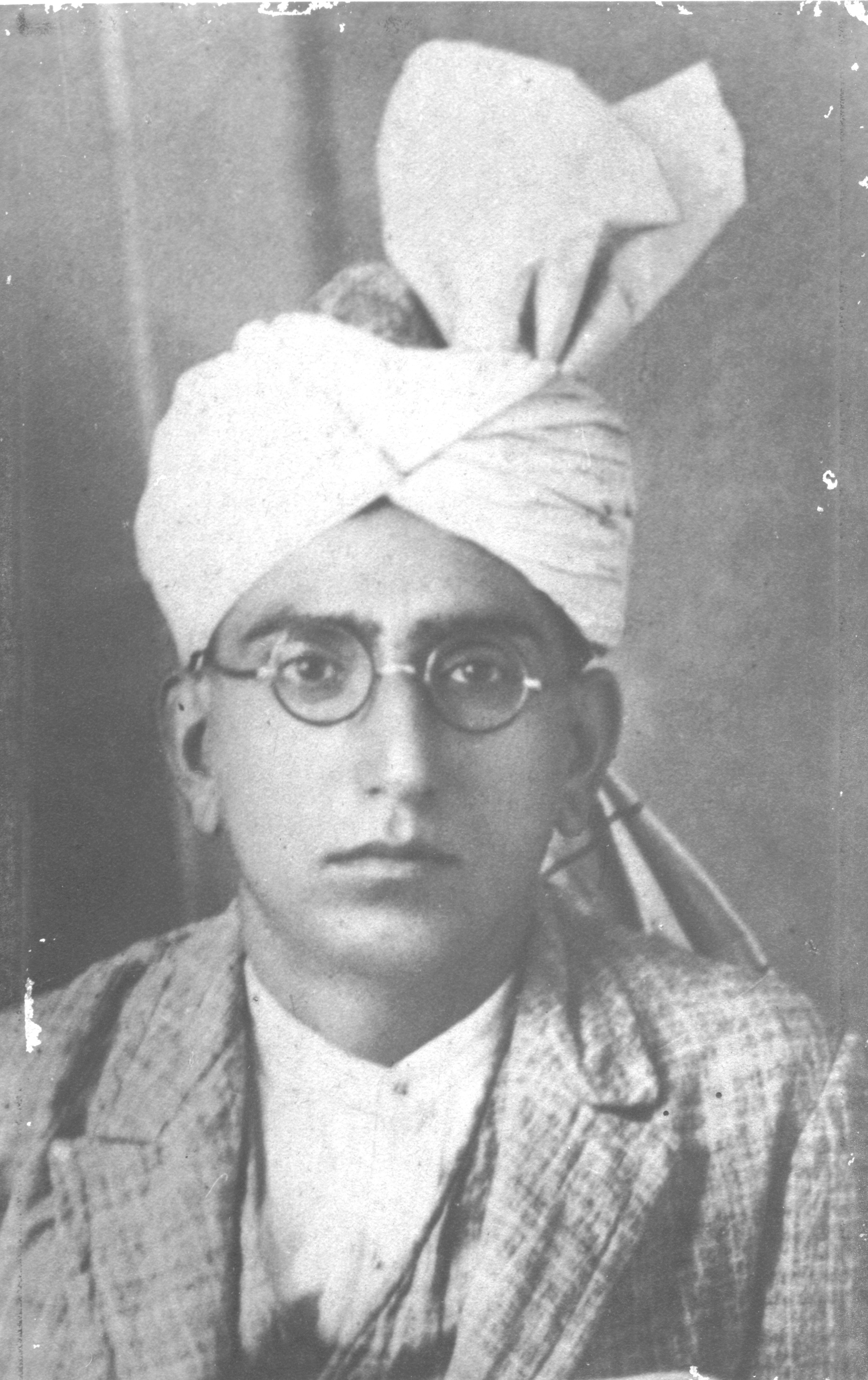
Amir Chand Bombwal, journalist from Peshawar wearing a Peshawari turban

Peshawari turban, also Peshawari patke (Pashto: پېښوري پټکی) or Peshawari lungee, is the traditional turban worn in Peshawar, Hazara region and amongst the Pahari-Pothwari people of Azad Jammu and Kashmir and Pothwar Plateau.

It is a two-piece headgear. One piece is a dome-shaped hard cap or kulla, generally embroidered with golden thread. The other is called lungi which consists of a long and narrow piece of cotton cloth (not to be confused with a waist cloth wrapped in some regions). It has a fan-shaped turra (crest) and a tail termed shamla.

Subhas Chandra Bose had used a Peshawari turban to disguise himself as a Pashtun in 1941 to flee from the British territory.

During the British rule a similar turban was part of the dress for some government peons.

== Gandhara turban gallery from major museums (1st-3rd century CE) ==
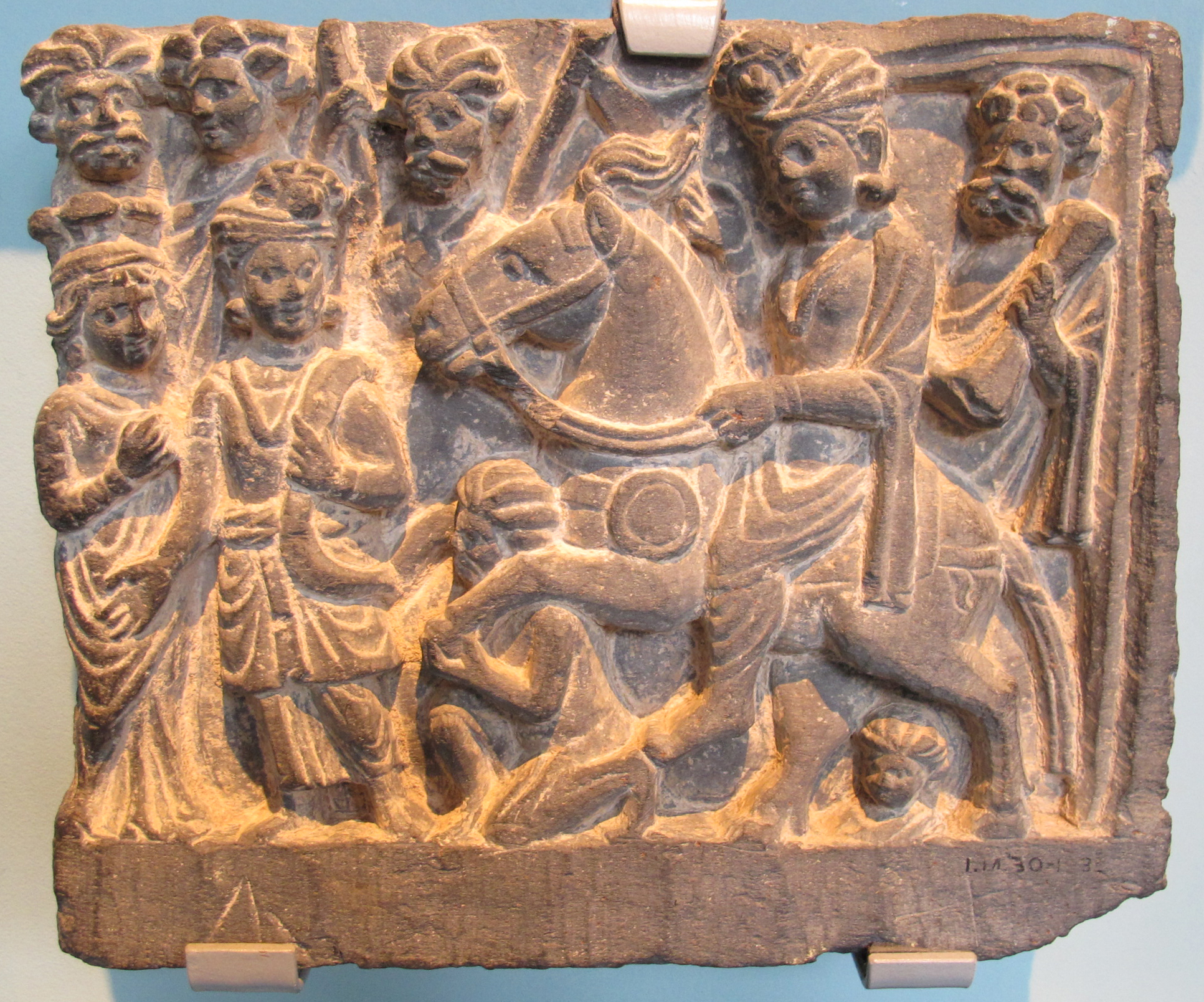
The Great Departure of Buddha, Victoria and Albert Museum click on image for detail

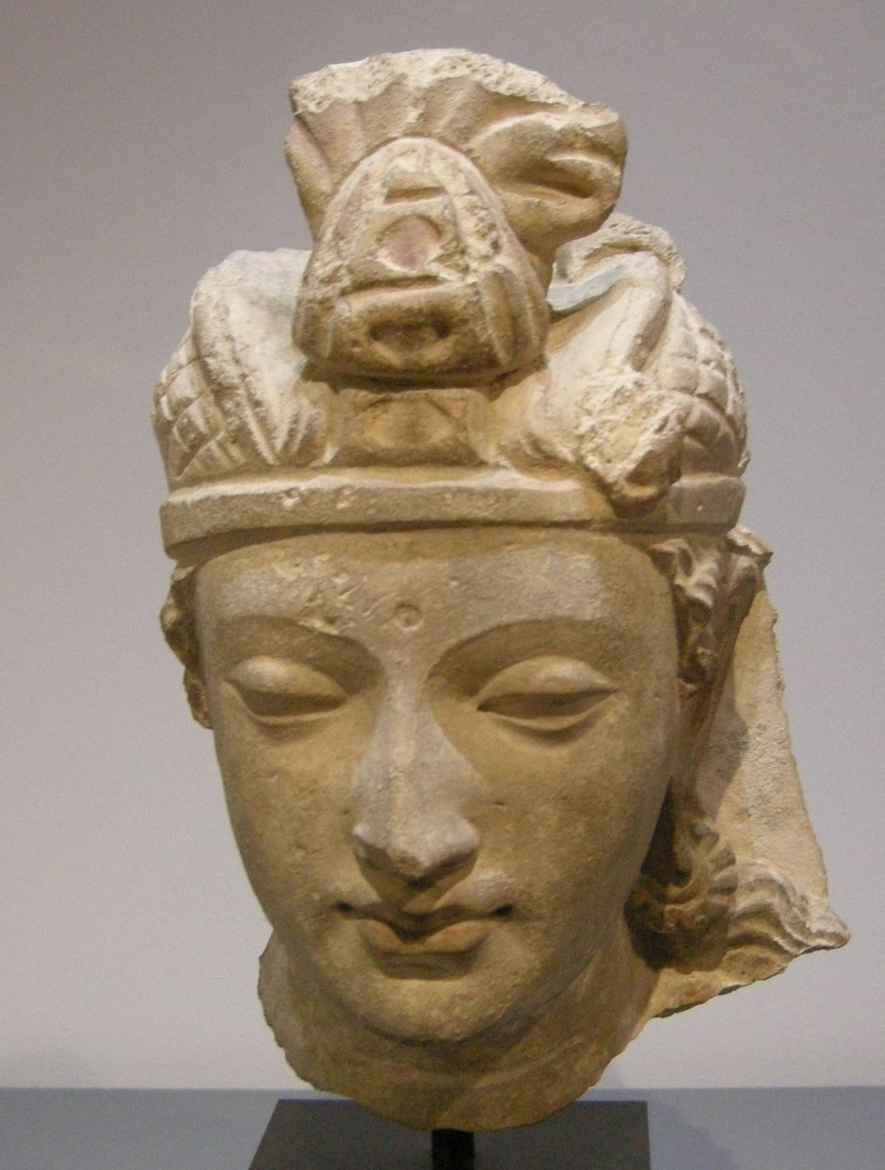
Hadda

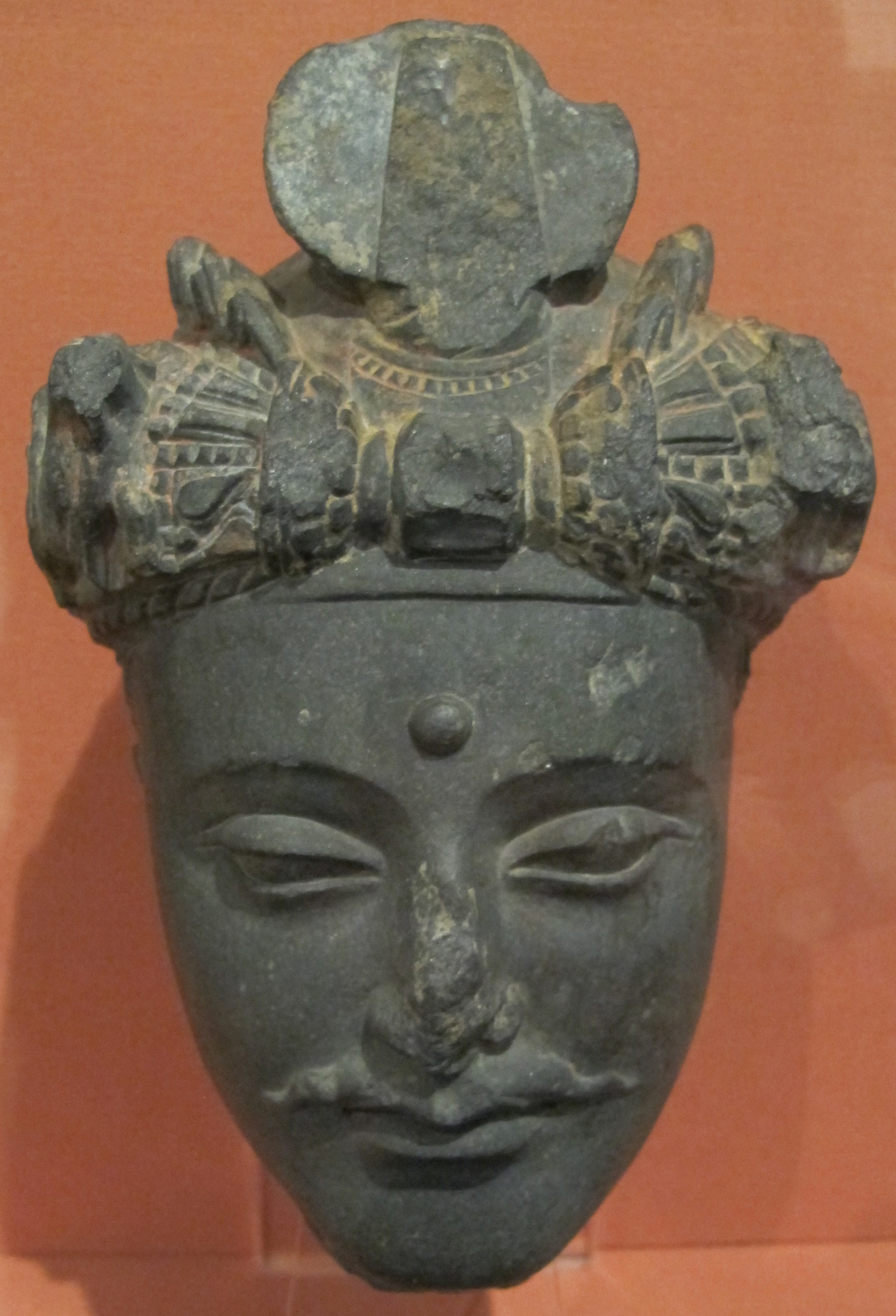
Victoria and Albert Museum

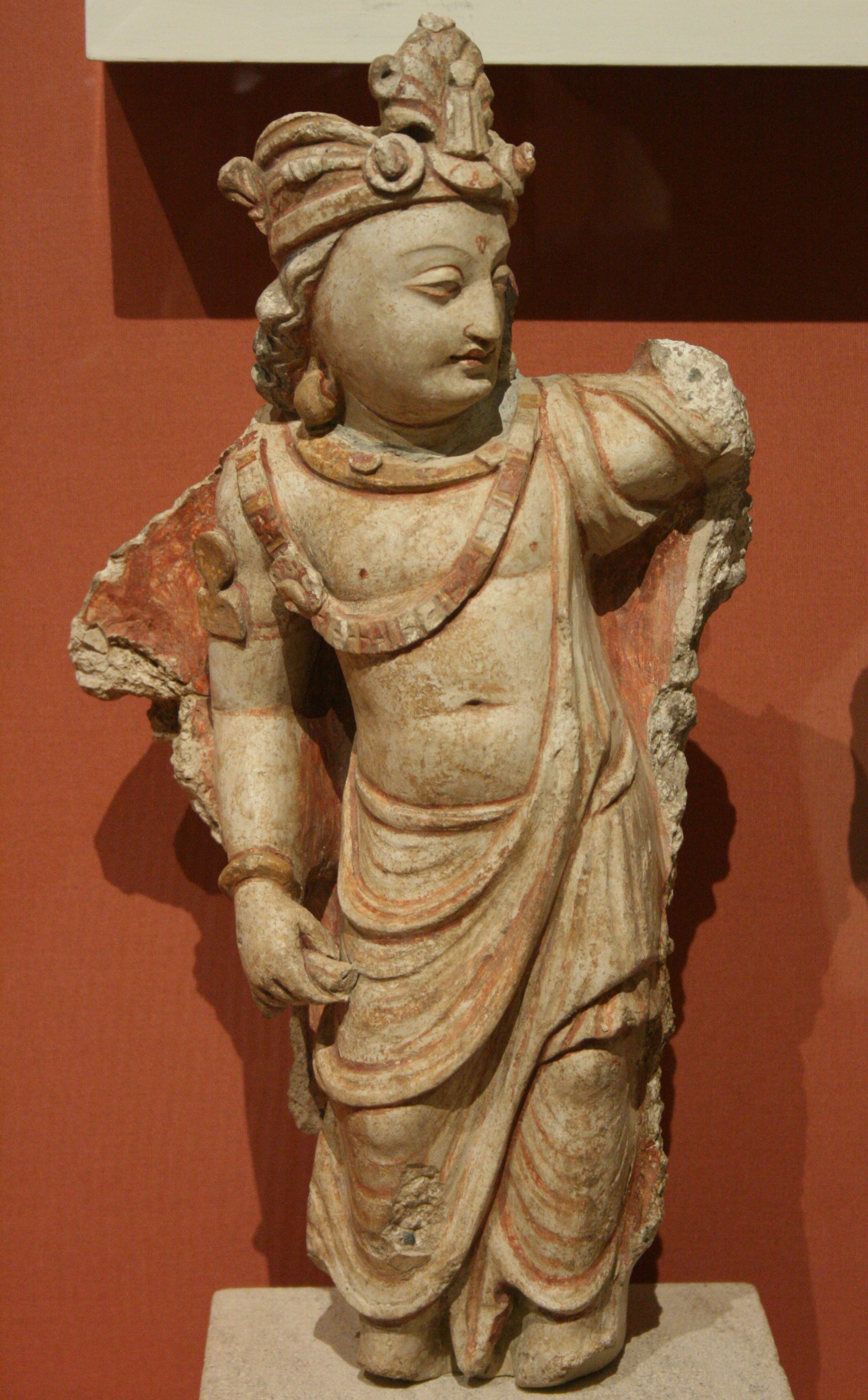
Victoria and Albert Museum

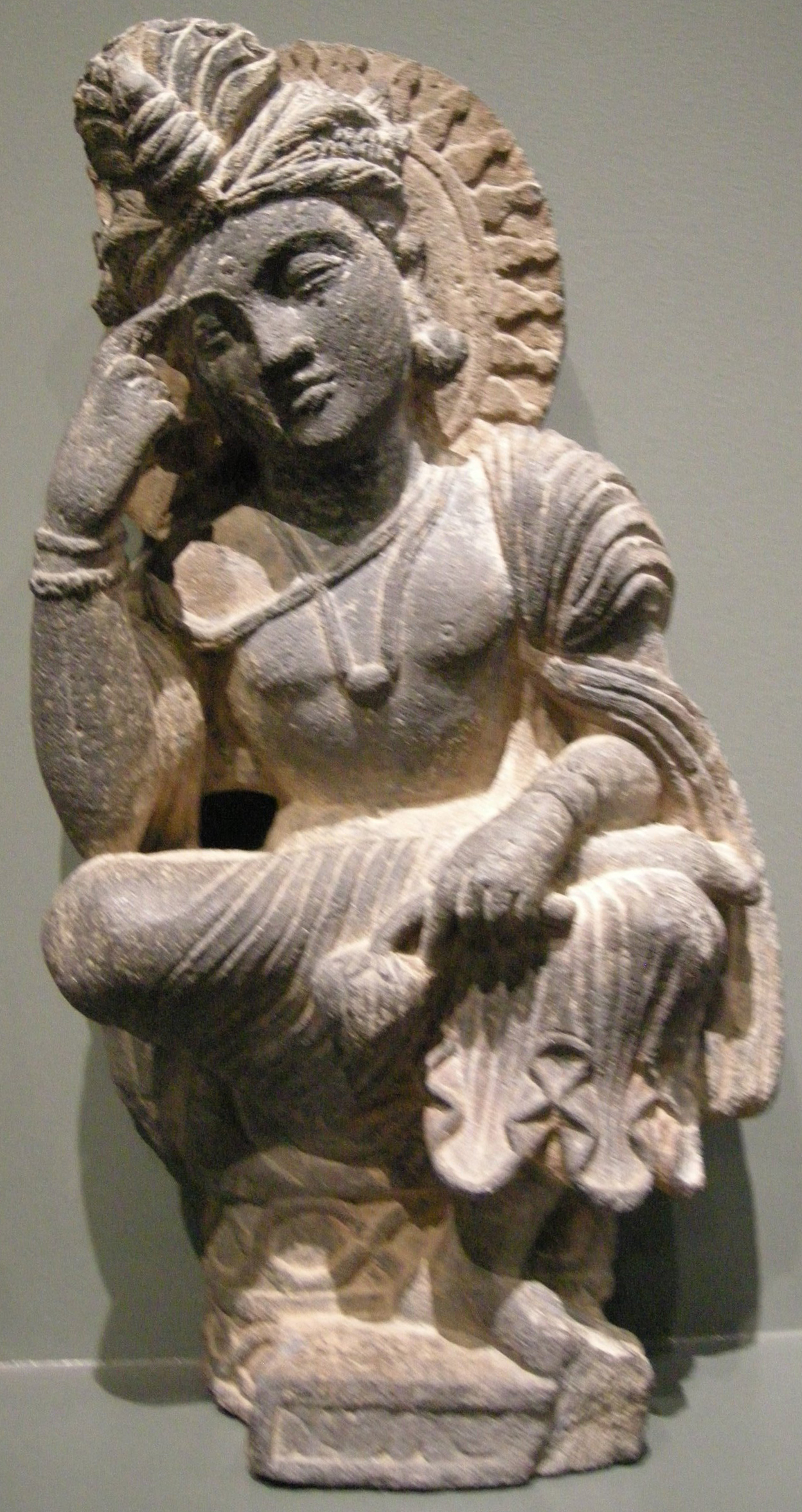
Los Angeles County Museum of Art

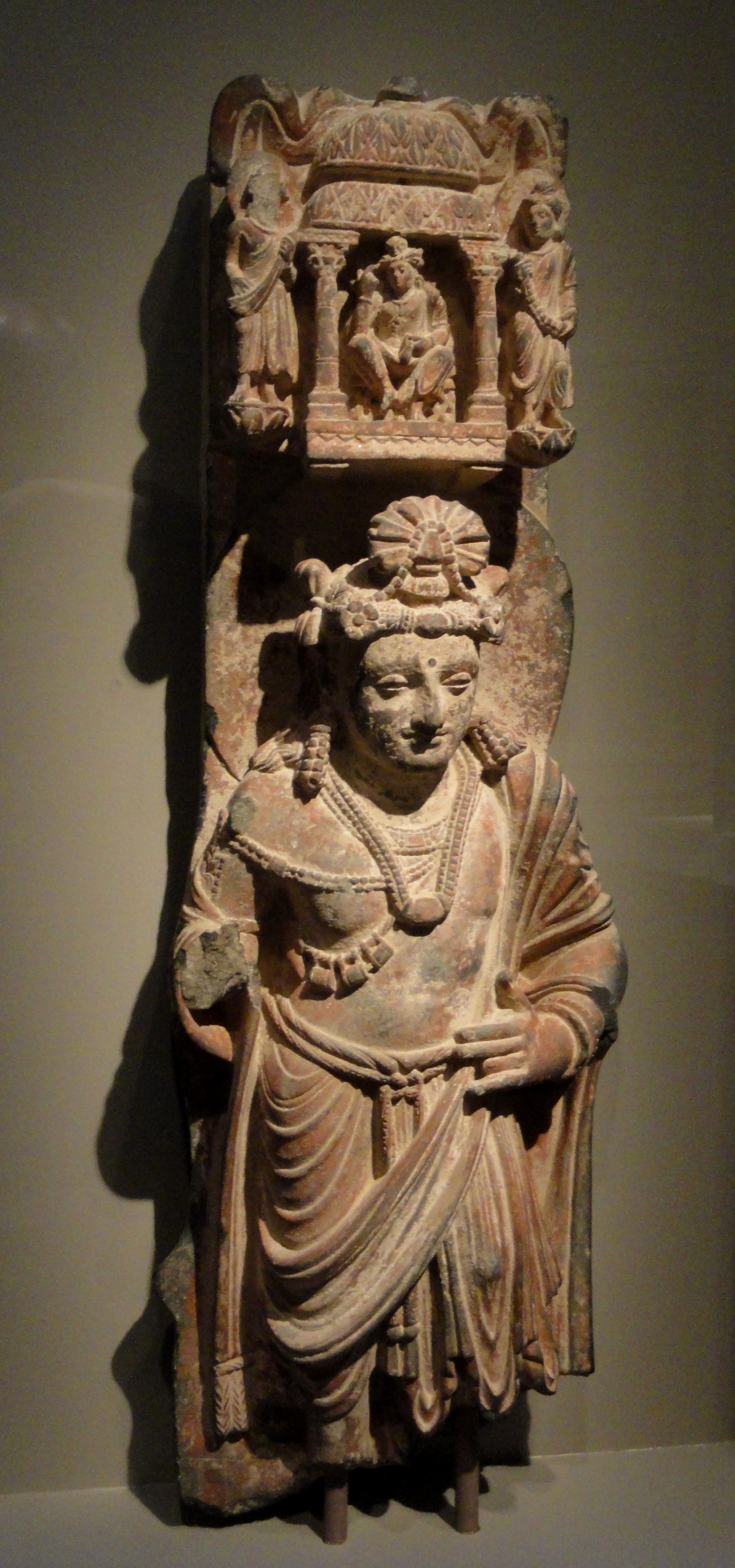
Bodhisattva Maitreya, Arthur M. Sackler Gallery click on image for detail

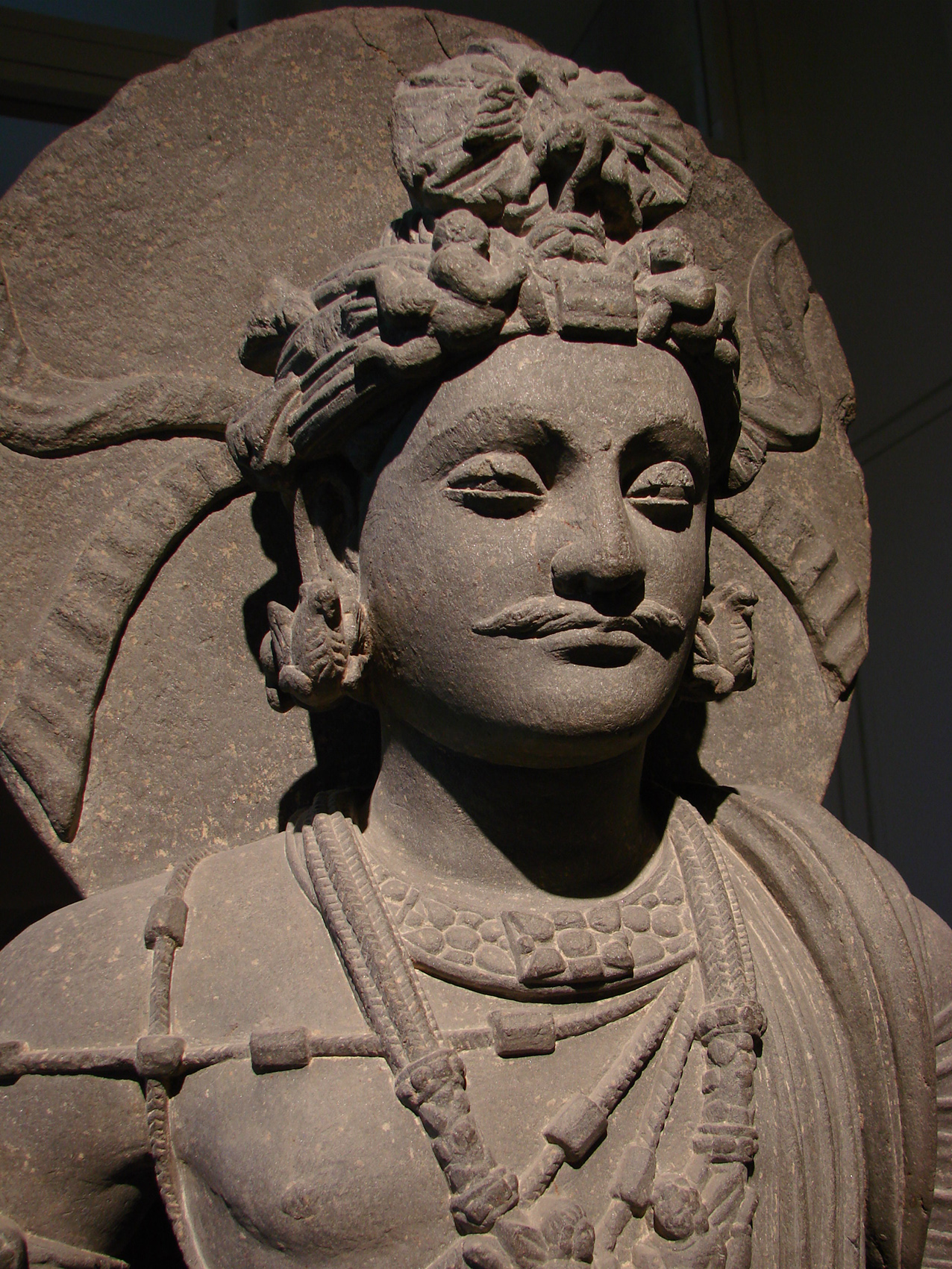
Guimet Museum

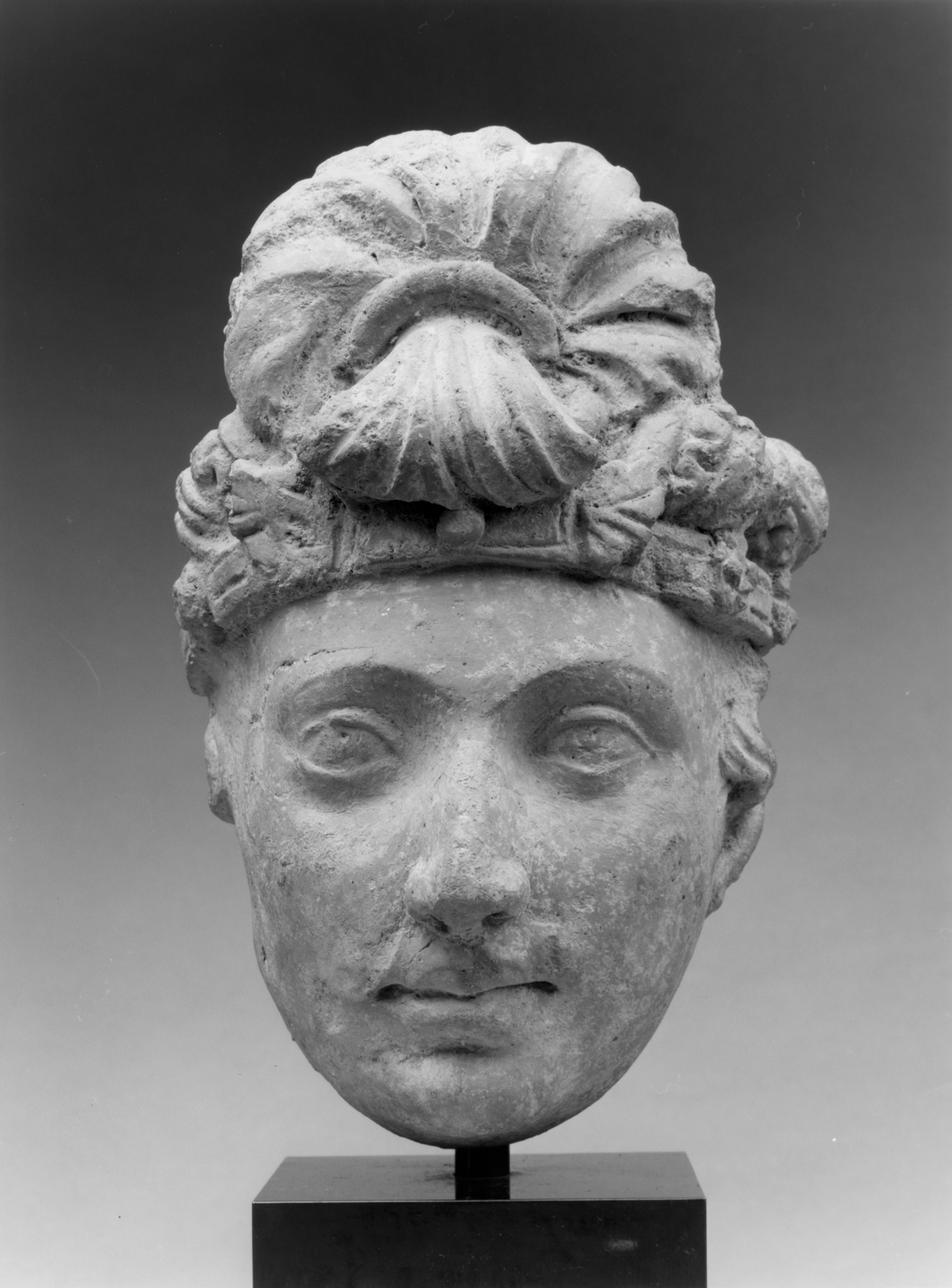
Walters Art Museum, Baltimore

== See also ==
- Khăn vấn
- Peshawari chappal
- Pagri (turban)
- Puneri Pagadi
- Turban
- Rasam Pagri
