= Turra =

Turra is a historical region in Darfur, Sudan, and is held as the ancestral heartland of the Fur. It comprises several peaks in the northern Jebel Marra and hosts many ruins and archaeological sites that are associated with Keira sultans of Darfur between the 16th and 17th centuries. It was the burial place of almost all Darfurian sultans, and hosted the state's national festival. The centre of the Keira state moved out of Turra around 1680, however it continued to be of sacral importance. Likely once home to a large population, in the present day the region is sparsely populated.

== History and ruins ==
Located in the northern part of Jebel Marra, Turra is widely regarded to have been the centre of the Tora, a semi-legendary culture that preceded the Fur there. In local oral traditions they appear as "white giants" who arrived in Darfur from somewhere in the north, which may hint to them originally being Berbers. Andrew McGregor (an archaeologist) wrote that Tora may correspond to Tura, a term in Kanem-Borno for the Teda Tubu.

The Tora were succeeded by the Daju kingdom from the 12th century, and then the Tunjur empire. A Tunjur king called "Shau Dorsid" (lit. 'the master over us') is thought to have ruled around the 16th century, and is portrayed as a tyrant in traditions. There remains several ruins that are associated with him; he is said to have ordered the levelling of a mountain named Mailo (located west of the foot of Jebel Marra) where he wished to build his palace. The project was eventually abandoned due to slow progress. There are many large stone complexes at the top of hills and mountains in northern Jebel Marra (and Jebel Si located directly to Turra's north) that are attributed to the Tunjur state. A ruined complex named Kusi is the only site in Turra associated with Shau Dorsid, only infrequently stayed in according to local tradition.

Most traditions say that, at the request of the nobility, Shau Dorsid was overthrown by his half-brother Daali, who moved from the Tunjur capital of Uri to Turra and founded the Keira state of Darfur. Turra hosts several ruins associated with Keira sultans between the 16th and 17th centuries, namely Daali, Kuuruu, Tunsam, Sulayman, Musa, and Ahmad Bukr. A large ruined circular stone complex near the summit of Jebel Foga is said to have been Daali's palace (tong daali), more akin to the Tora architectural style than that of the Daju or Tunjur. Close to it at the Jebel Forei plateau is another large structure associated with Kuuruu, Daali's successor, suited to defence amid his and his son's civil war with Kunsam. At Dulo Kuri (about 6 mi (9.7 km) east of Kurra) lies another ruined complex atop a gorge which is associated with Tunsam, and shows signs of deliberate destruction, possibly as a result of the civil war won by Sulayman (Kuuruu's son).

Sulayman, who is regarded as the 'second founder' of the Keira state because of his military campaigns and having made an Islamic state, is associated with several sites, the most prominent of which is a palacial complex at Jebel Nami named tong kilo; located in the centre of Turra and reaching 2,159 m (7,083 ft), Jebel Nami is the tallest of its peaks. The site features a large stone wall built in Tora style, 12 ft (3.7 m) high and around 7 ft (2.1 m) thick. The site is also said to have been resided in by Sulayman's son and successor, Musa. Ruins located at a hill named Abu Asal are associated with Ahmad Bukr (r. early-18th century), said to have been his palace and where he defeated and killed his brother Giggeri in battle. Bukr was reportedly the last sultan to build his palace in Turra; he had several fashirs (itinerant courts) elsewhere, and the Keira soon moved out of the mountainous Turra, onto the plains to the west of Jebel Marra.

Despite the Keira's relocation, Turra retained its sacral importance and was the burial place of almost all of the Keira sultans (the only exceptions were 'Umar Lel, who died in captivity in Wadai, and Ibrahim Qarad, who died in battle against al-Zubayr's invasion). The royal burial ground originally consisted of stone and mud buildings, which were replaced with red-brick structures by Sultan Ali Dinar in 1910. Bukr's and Muhammad Dawra's tombs reportedly had qubbas, however they were poorly maintained and were destroyed by Dinar. Sulayman's and Musa's tombs are housed together, while the others are grouped separately with several having their own structures. North of the burial ground is a mosque, finished during Bukr's reign, which was maintained by several generations of Jawami'a fakirs (appointed as imams) relocated from Kordofan. The graves of Keira pagan kings (before Sulayman) are located around Jebel Kora.

In the present day Turra is sparsely populated, and is regarded by the Fur as their ancestral homeland.

== "Covering of the Drums" ==
The national festival of Darfur was jalud al-nahasl ("covering of the drums"), and it was held at Turra during the dry season in February or March. It continued for 8 to 10 days and consisted of several rituals, feasts, and parades, and served to strengthen the relationships between the sultan and his subjects. It was also the time when tributes and taxes were collected, and punishments imparted.

Before the festival began, sacrifices (sadaqa) were offered to the tombs of deceased sultans at Turra; for past Muslim rulers this was accompanied by readings of the Quran. The festival commenced with the sultan carrying out the "first sowing", wherein he would fell a lone tree with an axe given to him by the mirong sagal ("chief of the blacksmiths") and sow some millet (dukhn) in the seven holes made, which was then buried by the habbobat ("grandmothers"). On the way back to the fashir (itinerant court) several hares and deer were caught in a hunt. At evening prayer the sultan selected two white cows and a steer; the following day, he killed them, and titleholders cleaned the skin of one of them. The mirong sagal would then fasten it to the royal drums, and the sultan would forcibly break one of the cows' ribs over the mansura drum (the most sacred one). The next day, a light-coloured wether with black hair around its eyes would be slaughtered; cuts from it were then given to the chiefs, with the order and which part of the cow symbolically chosen. The kundanga feast occurred three days after this, at which the princes and princesses (and potentially some title-holders) were forced to eat some of the putrefied entrails of the wether; hesitation or refusal was met with execution, as it was viewed to amount to treason against the sultan. This was followed by public parades wherein the sultan would review his horsemen.
