= Kaskara =

Type of sword characteristic of Sudan, Chad, and Eritrea

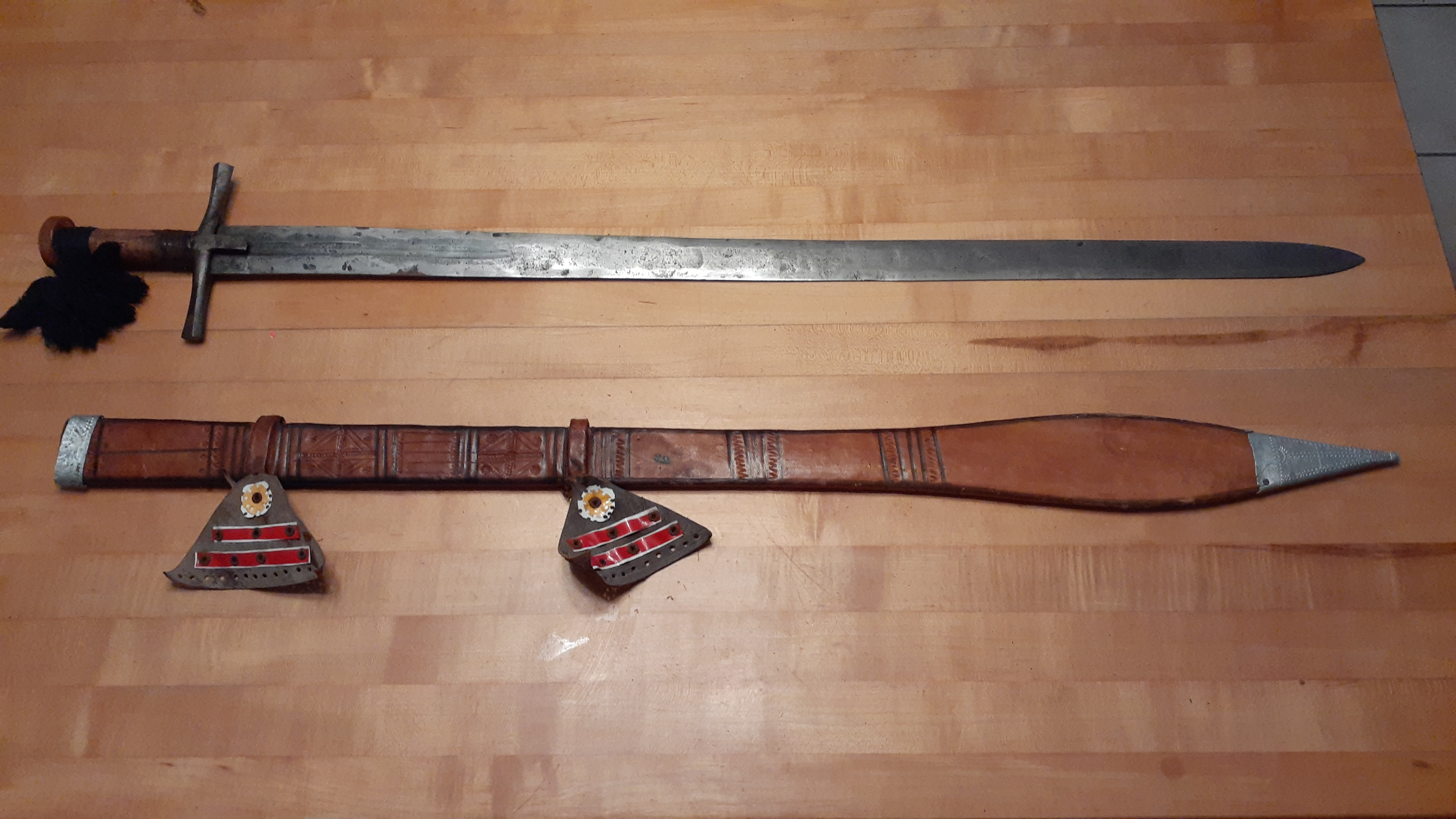
- A sword with a flared scabbard
- Type: Sword
- Place of origin: Chad, Eritrea, and Sudan

Service history
- Used by: Mahdist State
- Wars: Mahdist War

Specifications
- Blade length: 34 1/2–36 in (880–910 mm)
- Blade type: Straight, double-edged
- Hilt type: Cross-guarded
- Scabbard/sheath: Flared

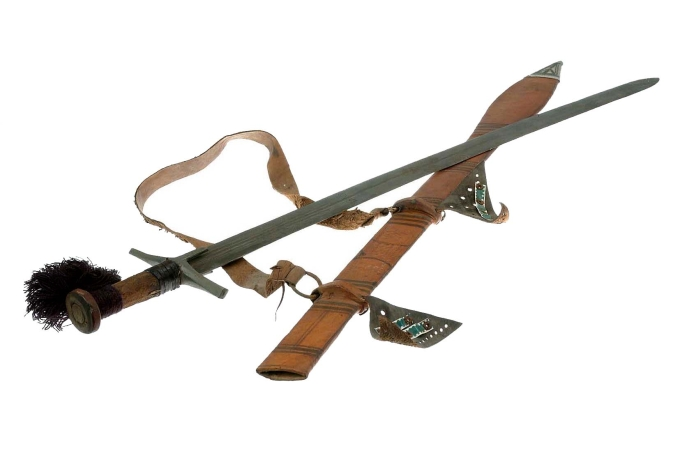
Kaskara sword and wooden handle, Tropenmuseum, Netherlands.

The kaskara is a type of traditional sword, which is characteristic of Sudan, Chad, and Eritrea. The blade of the kaskara was usually about a yard long, double edged and with a spatulate tip. While most surviving examples are from the 19th century, the type is believed to have originated around the early 14th century, and may represent a localized survival of the straight, double-edged medieval Arab sword. The kaskara was worn horizontally across the back or between the upper arm and thorax. According to British Museum curator Christopher Spring, "in the central and eastern Sudan, from Chad through Darfur and across to the Red Sea province, the straight, double-edged swords known as kaskara were an essential possession of most men."
