= Sulayman Solong =

First historical sultan of Darfur

Sultan of Darfur
- Reign: 1596–1637 (disputed)
- Successor: Musa Sulayman
- Born: c. 1550
- Died: c. 1637 (aged 86–87)
- Dynasty: Keira dynasty
- Religion: Islam

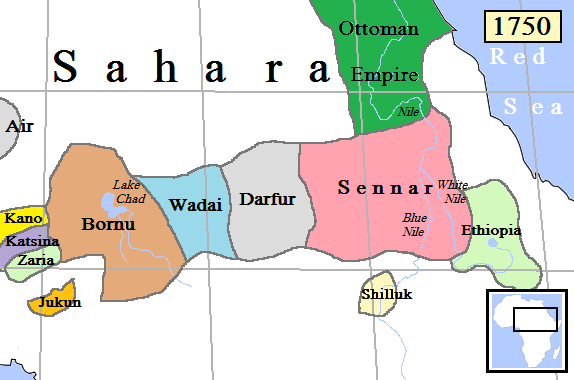
Map of pre-colonial states in Central Africa, with the Darfur Sultanate in grey.

Sulayman Solong (Arabic: سليمان سلونق; c. 1550 – c. 1637) was the first historical sultan of Darfur. According to several sources, he ruled the Sultanate of Darfur from 1596 to 1637. However, because of the lack of contemporary references, estimates of his reign dates diverge widely, with some modern scholars stating that he probably reigned between 1660 and 1680.

== Biography ==
The Keira dynasty (also spelled Kayra) sprang from the Kunjara, one of the three Fur tribes. Although Fur tradition speaks of early rulers such as Daali and Kuuruu, they are generally regarded as folk heroes. Sulaiman Solong is considered the first historical ruler of the Keira dynasty. According to traditional accounts, a land dispute erupted between Sulaiman's father Kuuruu and his uncle Tunsam, which forced Kuuruu to flee with Sulaiman to Dar Masalit in the west. Sulaiman grew up there among his mother's Masalit tribe, to whom an Arab origin is generally ascribed. When he became strong enough, he overthrew his uncle Tunsam, recaptured Jabal Marra from him and forced him to flee east to the border with Kordofan. Modern historians hypothesize that the civil war between Kuuruu and Tunsam may be linked to the collapse of the Tunjur empire.

Little is known of Sulaiman's reign with the traditions surrounding being recorded two centuries later. Sulaiman's nickname "Solong" means "the red-faced" or "the Arab" in the Fur language, in reference either to his complexion or to his mother's origins. He is remembered as a warrior and conqueror who led 33 military campaigns, thereby transforming his Fur tribal kingdom into a multiethnic empire in succession to the Tunjur. He conquered Kordofan and for a time extended his dominions over the Funj Sultanate, which was weakened due to a series of civil wars. His conquests were mainly aimed at increasing the number of slaves he held, which he could then barter with merchants from surrounding regions for arms, war-horses and fine cloth. Nevertheless, Sulaiman's sultanate lagged behind other Sub-Saharan African states in terms of modern weaponry. Unlike the Bornu or Songhai empires, Darfur did not use firearms.

The monarchy Sulaiman founded followed the then common African model of divine kingship, which was later transformed under the impact of Islam. Sulaiman is traditionally credited with making Islam the sultanate's state religion. The prior religion of his semi-legendary predecessors is unclear, with some sources suggesting that it was paganism. Sulaiman built mosques for his subjects and encouraged Islamic practices such as circumcision. However, the Islamization of the Keira state was a slow process, and the monarchy retained pre-Islamic rituals throughout its existence.

Sulaiman was married to an Arab woman. He was succeeded on his death by his son Musa Sulayman and was buried on Jabal Marra, which went on to become the ancestral cemetery of the Fur sultans. Sulaiman was considered the "founding father" of the Keira state, a status that was highlighted in the oral traditions as well as on the seals of succeeding sultans, which often gave a pedigree back to Sulaiman. Nevertheless, historian Peter Malcolm Holt writes in the Encyclopaedia of Islam that Sulaiman was probably not the founder of the Keira dynasty, but simply its first Muslim ruler. Sulaiman's descendants continued to reign over Darfur until Ali Dinar's death in battle at the hands of the British in 1916.

== See also ==
- History of Darfur
- Islamization of Sudan

== Bibliography ==
- Fisher, Humphrey J. (1977). "The Eastern Maghrib and the Central Sudan". In Oliver, Roland (ed.). The Cambridge History of Africa. Vol. 3: c. 1050 – c. 1600. Cambridge University Press. pp. 232–330. ISBN 978-0-521-20981-6.
- Hill, Richard Leslie (1967) [First published 1951]. A Biographical Dictionary of the Sudan. Library of African Study Series (2nd ed.). London: Frank Cass and Company. ISBN 978-0-7146-1037-5.
- Holt, Peter Malcolm (1977). "The Nilotic Sudan". In Holt, Peter Malcolm; Lambton, Ann K. S.; Lewis, Bernard (eds.). The Cambridge History of Islam. Vol. 2A. Cambridge University Press. pp. 327–344. ISBN 978-0-521-29137-8.
- Holt, Peter Malcolm (1982). "Egypt, the Funj and Darfur". In Fage, John Donnelly; Oliver, Roland (eds.). The Cambridge History of Africa. Vol. 4: c. 1600 – c. 1790. Cambridge University Press. pp. 14–57. ISBN 978-0-521-20413-2.
- Holt, Peter Malcolm (1991). "Dār Fūr". The Encyclopaedia of Islam. Vol. II: C–G (New ed.). Leiden: E. J. Brill. pp. 121–125. ISBN 978-90-04-07026-4.
- MacMichael, Harold Alfred (1967) [First published 1912]. The Tribes of Northern and Central Kordofán. Volume 42 of Cass Library of African Studies: General Studies. London: Frank Cass and Company. ISBN 978-0-7146-1113-6.
- O'Fahey, Rex S. (2008). The Darfur Sultanate: A History. Columbia/Hurst Series. New York: Columbia University Press. ISBN 978-0-231-70038-2.
- Ofcansky, Thomas (1992) [Research completed June 1991]. "Historical Setting". In Metz, Helen Chapin (ed.). Sudan: A Country Study. Country Studies (4th ed.). Washington, D.C.: Federal Research Division of the Library of Congress. ISBN 978-0-8444-0750-0.

Sulayman Solong Keira dynasty Cadet branch of the Kunjara tribe Born: c. 1550 Died: c. 1637
Regnal titles
First	Sultan of Darfur; 1596–1637	Succeeded by Musa Sulayman
