= Ali Dinar =

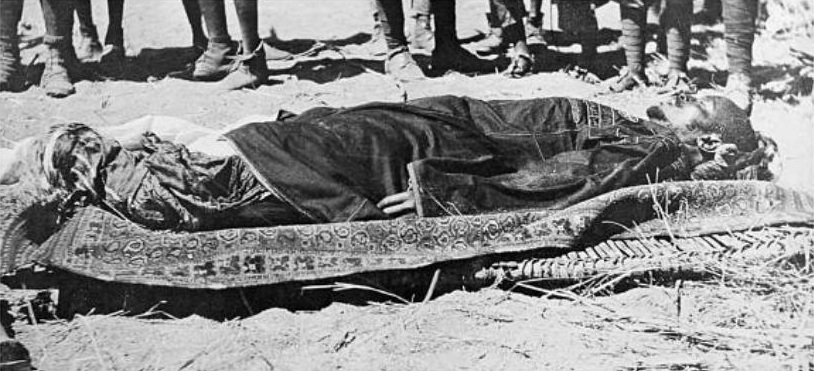
- Ali Dinar after his death in battle in 1916

Sultan of Darfur
- Reign: September 1898 – 6 November 1916
- Predecessor: Position re-established
- Successor: Position abolished
- Born: 1865
- Died: 6 November 1916 (aged 50–51); Jabal Juba, Darfur
- Dynasty: Keira dynasty
- Father: Zakariyyāʾ b. Muḥammad al-Faḍl

Muhammad Ali Dinar (Arabic: محمد علي دينار, romanized: Muḥammad ʿAlī Dīnār; c. 1865 – 6 November 1916), known more generally as Ali Dinar, was the last sultan of Darfur and ruler from the Keira dynasty.

== Biography ==
Ali Dinar ascended to the throne of Darfur in 1891, after his cousin, the 'shadow sultan' Abū l-Khayrāt, was killed by a band of rebellious slaves. The incident surrounding Abū l-Khayrāt's death is obscure, but some sources allege that Ali Dinar had incited his death; Ali Dinar himself denied the allegation. This period of Ali Dinar's reign was troublesome, with him ultimately being urged by his followers to enter negotiations with the Mahdists in al-Fāshir, an act which brought about raids upon him by the Masālīt and his being despoiled by Bakhīt Abū Risha of Dār Silā.

Ultimately, Ali Dinar surrendered in Mahdist-occupied al-Fāshir on October 13, 1891. Initially being favorably received, Ali Dinar was later imprisoned for drinking wine. He was saved by the intercession of the amīr Maḥmūd w. Aḥmad, Mahdist governor of Darfur, subsequently joining the latter's entourage. Accompanying Maḥmūd, Ali traveled to Omdurman, the Mahdist capital, where he met the Khalīfa 'Abdallāhi. In June 1894, Ali returned to the Darfur, presumably in preparation for Maḥmūd w. Aḥmad's campaign of 1895. This return was short lived, however, as suspicions that Ali intended to rebel against the Mahdists caused him to be sent back to Omdurman in January 1895. Ali Dinar's time in Omdurman is obscure, but it is alleged that he was made a mulāzim [attendant] to the Khalīfa or his son, ʿUthmān, and came to be an acquaintance of Rudolf Slatin. Later, Ali Dinar entered the service of amīr Ibrāhīm al-Khalīl, Mahdist commander of jihādiyya, accompanying him in 1896 to fight in the Nuba Mountains.

As the Battle of Omdurman approached, Ali Dinar began planning his flight back to Darfur. Just before or during the battle, he put his plan into effect, bringing with him many notables of the old sultanate. Rendering hapless the Mahdist garrison at al-Fāshir and rival contenders to the throne, Ali Dinar began to rapidly reassert the authority of the Darfur Sultanate. He was especially focused on establishing a functioning judiciary system as well as rooting out Mahdist influence in the region. Ali Dinar also set about establishing diplomatic connections to various of his neighbors such as the Sānūsiyya, Wadai, Dār Silā, Dār al-Kūtī, etc.

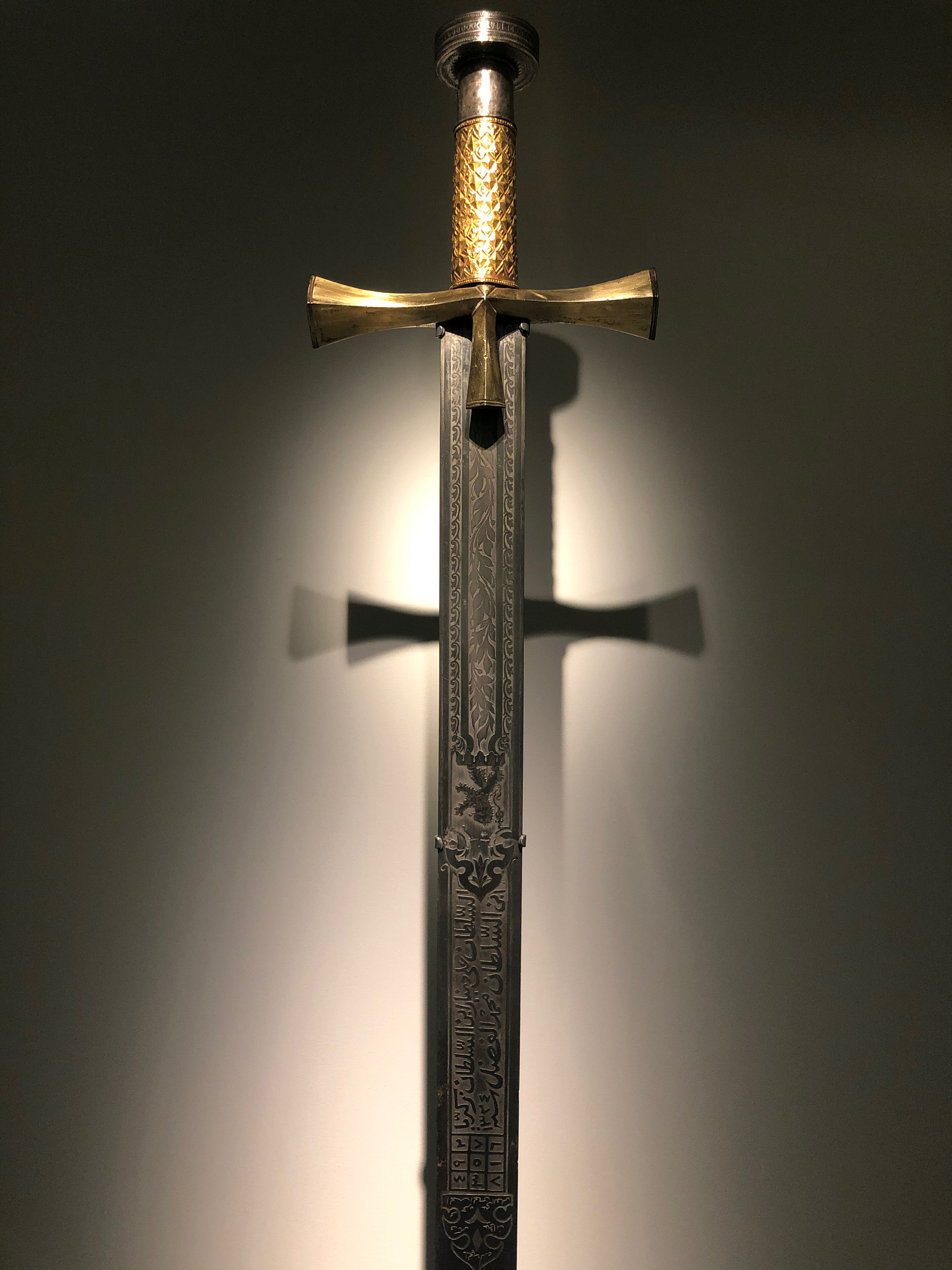
A sword owned by Ali Dinar, on display at the British Museum.

In 1915 Ali Dinar declared his support to the Ottoman Empire in the First World War, which led the British government to dispatch the invasion of Darfur, in which he was killed in action, after which his sultanate was incorporated into Anglo-Egyptian Sudan.

Ali Dinar Keira dynasty Born: 1865 Died: 6 November 1916
Regnal titles
Preceded by Position re-established	Sultan of Darfur; September 1898 – 6 November 1916	Succeeded by Position abolished
