= Birgid language =

Extinct Nubian language of Sudan

Birgid
- Murgi Birked
- Native to: Sudan
- Region: North Kordofan, South Darfur
- Extinct: 1970s
- Language family: Nilo-Saharan?: Eastern Sudanic; Northern Eastern; Nubian; Central; Birgid

Language codes
- ISO 639-3: brk
- Glottolog: birk1242

Birgid (also known as Bergit, Berguid, Kajjara, Murgi, Birked, Birguid, Birkit, Birqed) is a likely extinct Nubian language.

== Classification ==
Birgid is classified as a Nilo-Saharan language. It is part of the Nubian language cluster, but below this level, linguists disagree on the subdivision. Classification systems developed by Thelwall and by Bechhaus-Gers placed Birgid in a subgroup with the Hill Nubian languages (and Bechhaus-Gers also added Kenzi and Dongolawi to that subgroup). Alamin placed it within a Darfur Nubian subgroup alongside the Midob language. Some work, especially early classifications, placed Birgid in its own subgroup within Nubian.

== Geographic distribution ==
Birgid was spoken in western and northern Sudan, in North Kordofan and north of the city of Nyala in South Darfur. Robin Thelwall noted that his last contact with speakers of Birgid occurred in with elderly speakers in 1972, and thus the language is assumed to be extinct. It is possible there are still some speakers of Birgid around the border of Chad and Sudan.

Birgid is very poorly documented. As of 2014, the only published examples of Birgid were vocabulary lists from 1918 and 1977.

== Morphology ==
Birgid shares a complex number marking system with other northeastern Nilo-Saharan languages, including the Nubian and Taman groups. Some words are inherently singular and can be pluralized with a suffix. Others are inherently plural, and can be made singular with a suffix. Still others require a suffix to mark either singular or plural. Tone can also differentiate number.

Singulative and plural suffixes/tones in Birgid
Singular	Plural	English gloss
ɑŋɑl	ɑŋɑl-si	elephant
kur-ti	kur	man
wɑɑɲ-di	wɑɑɲ-e	star
úr	ùr	head

== Vocabulary ==
The known vocabulary of Birgid is limited to two vocabulary lists from the 20th century. These include a list of the numerals from one to ten:

Birgid numerals
Number	Birgid
1	meelug
2	ulug
3	tizzig
4	keemzi
5	tiʃʃi
6	korʃi
7	koldi
8	ittu
9	iɟiŋoldi
10	tummun
