= Kababish tribe =

Nomadic tribe in Sudan

Kababish
Total population
- Approximately 500,000

Regions with significant populations
- Sudan

Languages
- Sudanese Arabic

Religion
- Islam

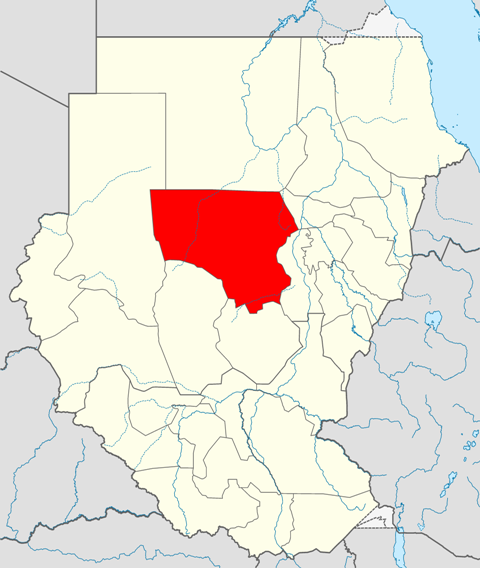
The main area for the Kababish nomads

The Kababish (/kəˈbɑːbɪʃ/ kə-BAHB-ish; Arabic: كبابيش kabābīsh) are a nomadic tribe of the northern Kordofan region of Sudan. The Kababish comprise about 19 different groups, which are all led by a single nazir or chief. Their main occupation is as camel herders, which gives them a high standing in Arabic society as camels are highly prized and valued.

The main religion of the Kababish is Islam, adhering to the Sunni denomination. They descend from Arab forefathers that hail from the Arabian tribe of Juhaynah, and speak a form of Sudanese Arabic. Women classically dress in a long blue cloth wrapped a few times around their body, while the men wear long white tunics, loose white pants and white turbans. Most men will carry a dagger or sword and perhaps a rifle or shotgun, due to the harshness of desert life and the threat of banditry due to their valuable stock.

== Herders ==
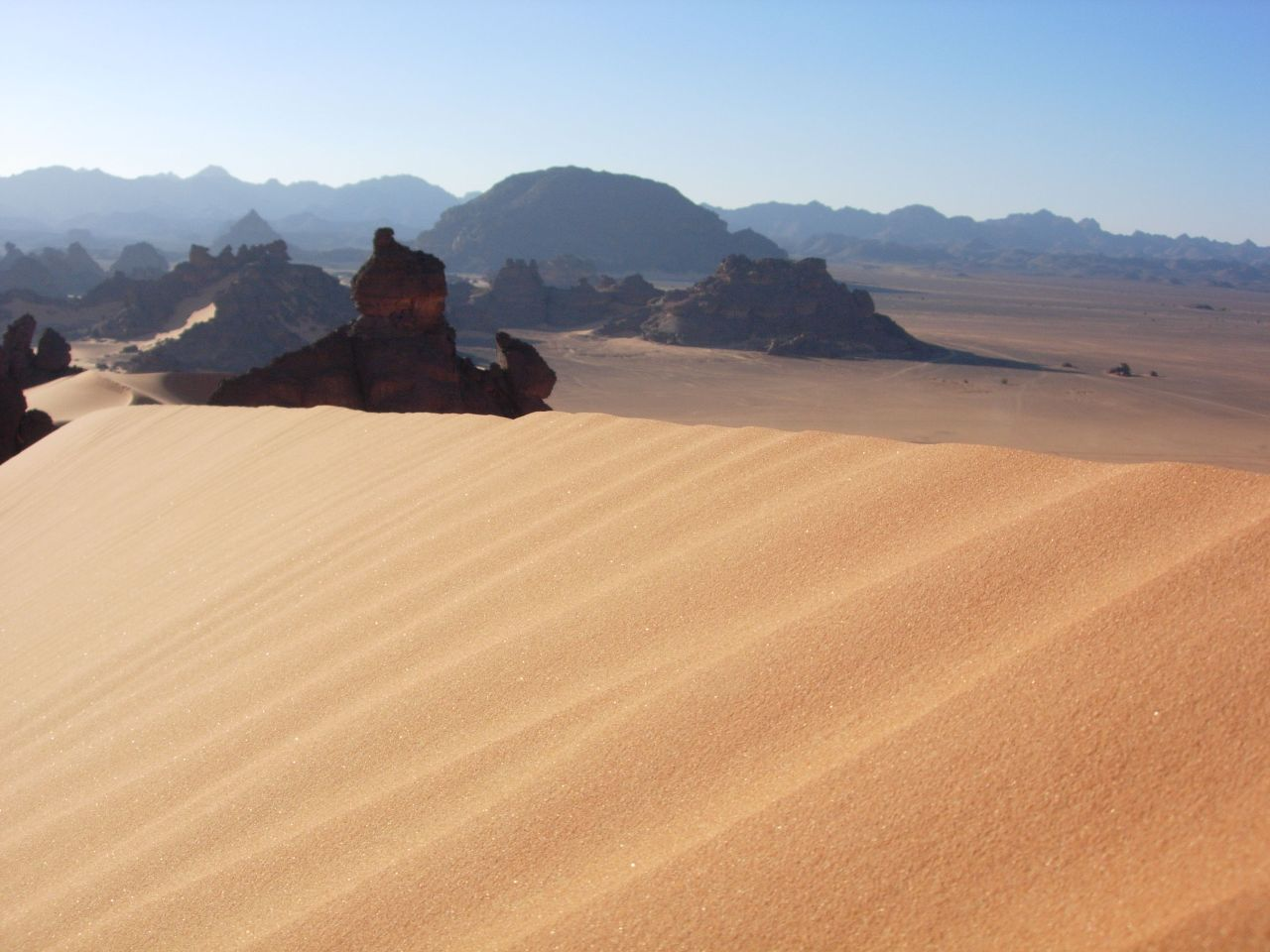
The Libyan Desert, a common migration route for Kababish and camels

From a young age children start to work at herding camels for water and feeding. What makes the Kababish stand out from other nomads is that the tribe does not all move together, often the women will stay at their camps or dikkas while the men move north towards the Libyan Desert.

== Home life ==
The Kababish's home is a simple place made of canvas or cloth walls and roofs made of camel hairs and hides. Inside will be a few ornaments and a large bed raised off the ground and bound together by leather straps. Meat, berries and whatever can be traded makes up the diet, as well as the Arabic staple of spiced tea.

== Contemporary Kababish ==
Since the famine in the 1980s life has become more strenuous for the Kababish, which has seen many turn towards the cities or take up a more semi-nomadic life. Today the tribe is estimated to be anywhere between 70,000 and 350,000, most of whom are illiterate.

== See also ==
- Demographics of Sudan
- El Arnab (a traditional kababish mancala game)
