= Ja'alin tribe =

Arab tribe in northern Sudan

Ja'alin جعليون
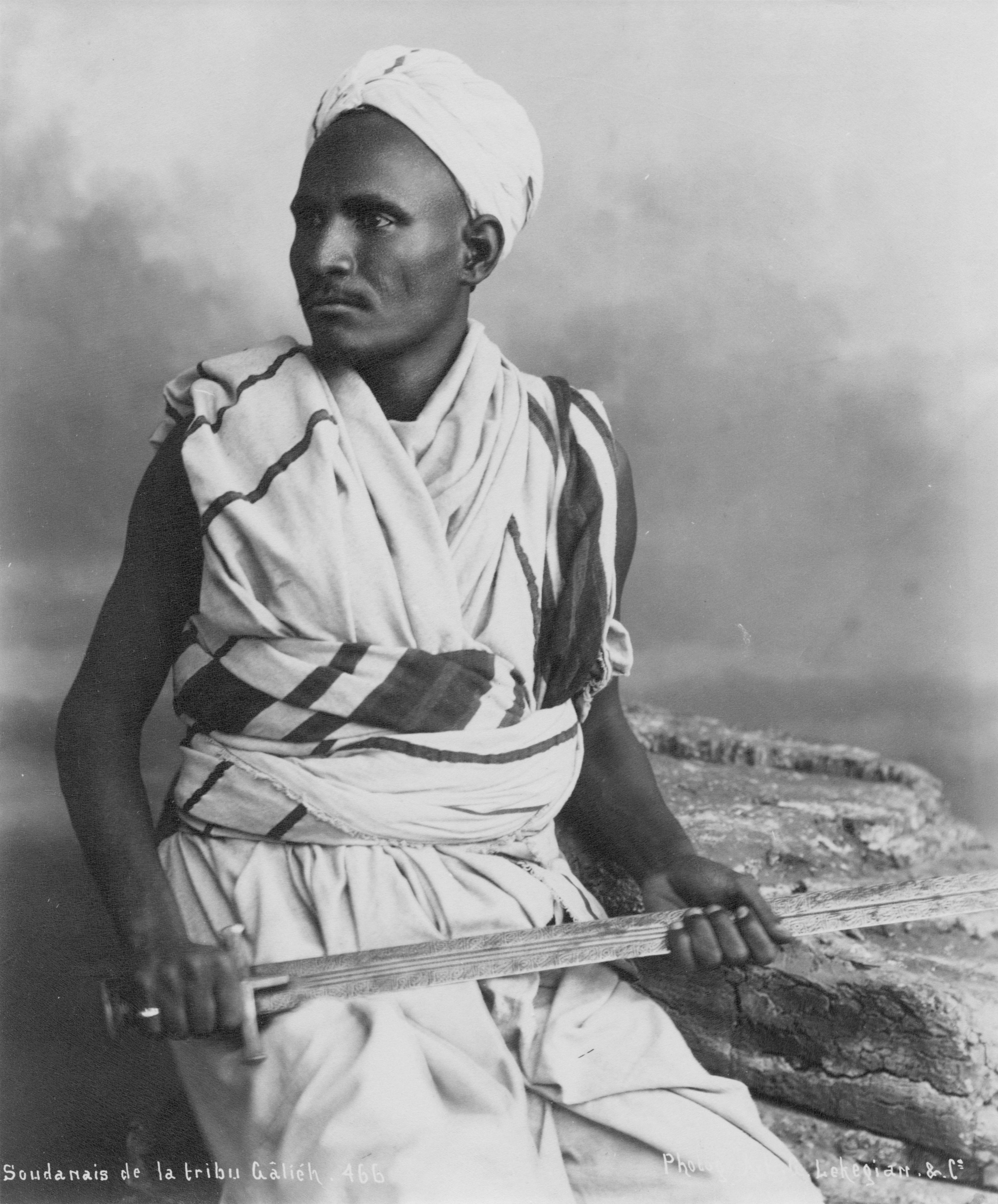
- Warrior from the tribe of the Ja'alin
- Ethnicity: Sudanese Arabs
- Location: Nile river basin between Atbara and the sixth Nile cataract
- Population: 2,880,000
- Demonym: Ja'ali
- Language: Sudanese Arabic
- Religion: Sunni Islam

The Ja'alin, Ja'aliya, Ja'aliyin or Ja'al (Arabic: جعليون) are a Sudanese Arab tribe in Sudan. They are also called "Ja'alin proper" to differentiate them from the Ja'alin federation, which includes a variety of Sudanese tribes in northern Sudan who trace their origins to the same ancestor, an Abbasid called Ibrahim Ja'al, yet constitute tribes of their own. The Ja'ali heartland stretches from Nile-Atbara confluence in the north to the sixth Nile cataract in the south.

The Ja'alin claim an Arab descent, while scholars sometimes refer to them as "Arabised Nubians".

== Origin ==
The Ja'alin describe themselves as being of Arab origin and trace their origins to Ibrahim Ja'al, an Abbasid noble, whose clan originally hailed from the Hejaz in the Arabian Peninsula and married into the local Nubian population. Ja'al was a descendant of al-Abbas, an uncle of Muhammad. Ja'al was an epithet which has been interpreted differently. (Note: The most common interpretation is that it derives from "j.'.l.", "to make", as in the sense of Ibrahim "making" his tribe by adopting various people. It has also been proposed that it derives from the word "Já'al", meaning "to put" or "to stay". Another less popular tradition states that Ibrahim was very dark-skinned, which is why his grandmother called him "Ju'al", "black beatle".) To differentiate them from other Sudanese tribes which claim descent from Ibrahim Ja'al, but still constitute tribes of their own (like for example the Shaigiya or Rubatab) they are also called "Ja'alin proper". The Ja'alin themselves are divided into over a dozen sub-tribes.

Various researchers have suggested that the Ja'alin are Arabized Nubians. A few 19th-century travellers claimed that Nubian was still spoken among them, although most agreed that they only spoke Arabic.

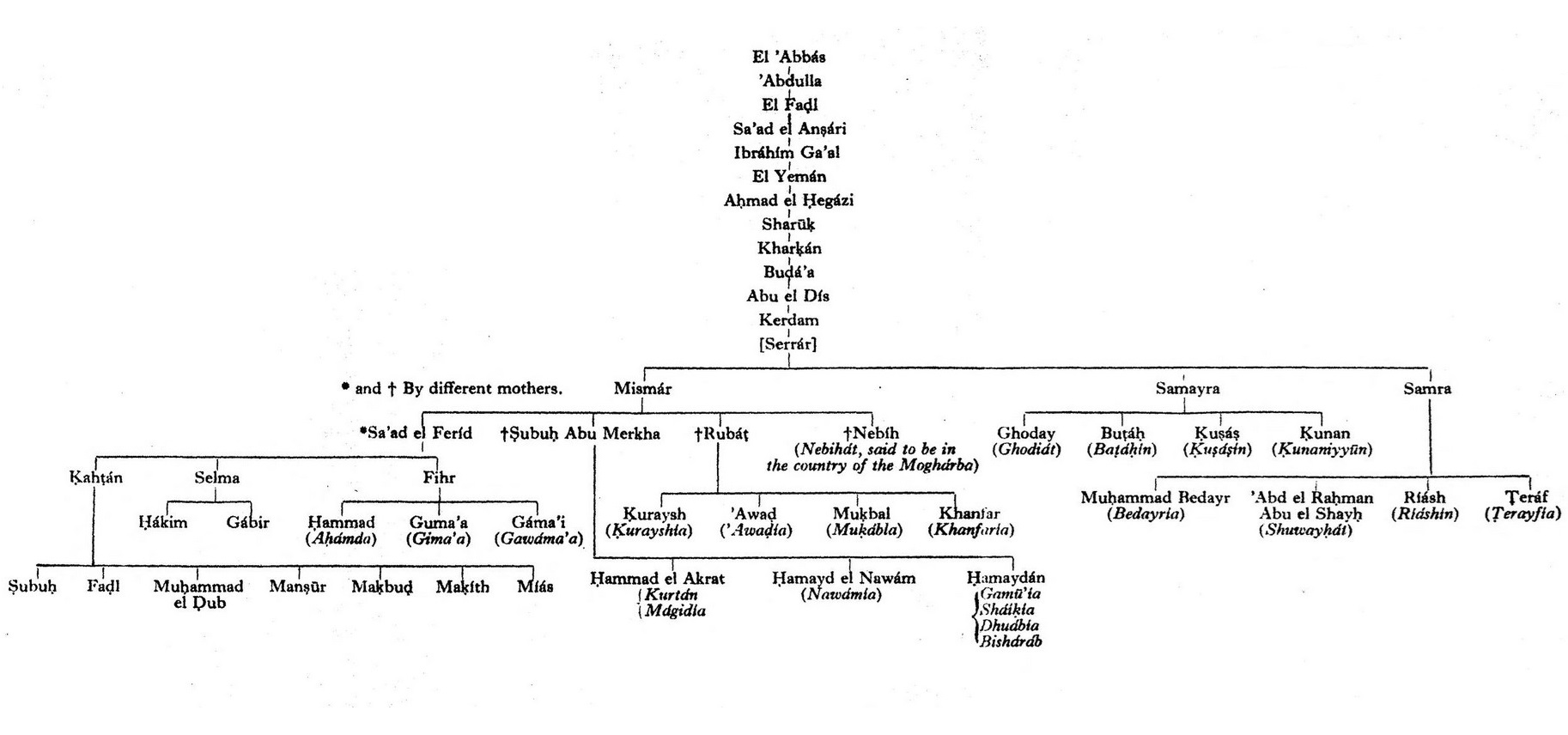
A genealogy of the Ja'alin published by Harold MacMichael in 1922. The Ja'alin trace their origin to a certain Ibrahim Ja'al (5th from top) and ultimately al-Abbas, uncle of Prophet Muhammad

== History ==
=== Precolonial period (until 1821) ===
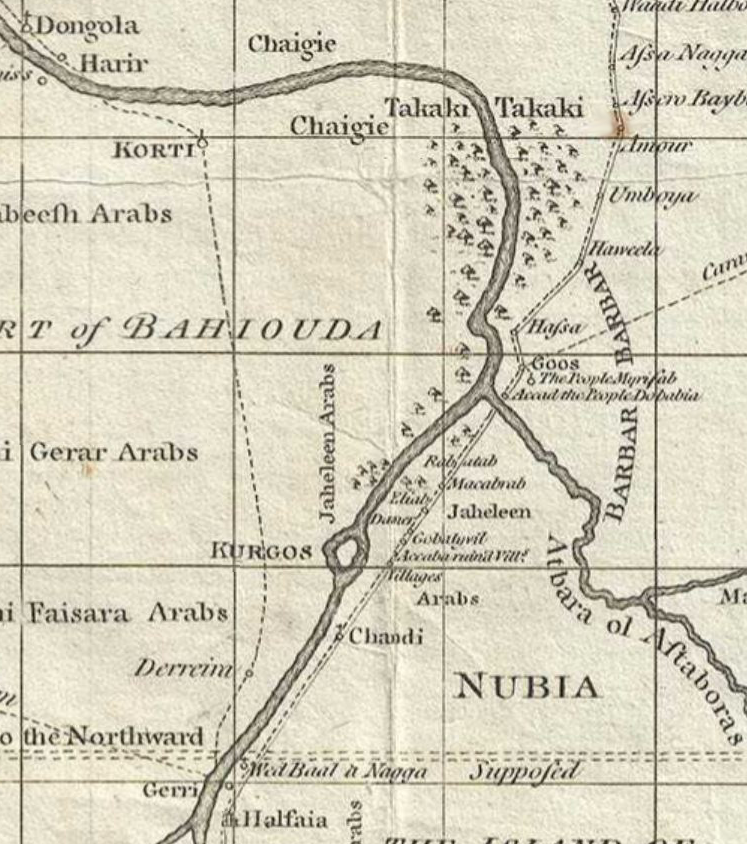
Map by James Bruce featuring the Ja'alin ("Jaheleen") north of Shendi ("Chandi"), 1772

Ja'ali traditions claim that they emigrated to Sudan in the 12th century or in 1260, shortly after the fall of Baghdad. Scottish traveller James Bruce, who visited the Funj Sultanate in 1772 and who was the first to compile traditions concerning its foundation, was told by local informants that the Ja'alin and other Arab tribes had entered Nubia during the reign of Caliph Umar (634–644). Some traditions note that the Ja'alin initially had their base in Kordofan west of the Nile. From there they conquered parts of the Nuba Mountains and encroached on the White Nile and the Nubian kingdom of Alodia, eventually sacking its capital Soba in 1476. Afterwards, but still before the foundation of the Funj Sultanate and its capital Sennar in 1504, the Ja'alin went on to conquer much of Nubia.

In written sources the Ja'alin were possibly already mentioned in 1523, when Jewish traveller David Reubeni visited the Funj Sultanate and mentioned a "kingdom of Al Ga'l". In Funj documents they appear as early 1724/1725, in a land charter issued under Sultan Badi IV. The ruling dynasty of the Ja'alin were the Sa'dab, who, according to Ja'ali traditions, ruled since the late 16th century. They bore the title arbab or amir and had to answer to the Abdallab, who ruled northern Sudan on behalf of the Funj from their capital Qarri near the sixth Nile cataract. The territory of the arbab extended from the Nile-Atbarah confluence in the north to Hajar al-Asal just north of the sixth Nile cataract. In the late 18th century the Ja'alin became practically independent and their ruler adopted the title makk ("king"). Soon after dynastic conflicts erupted and the old Sa'dab dynasty, now confined to El Matamah and the west bank, was challenged by the ascending Nimrab clan in Shendi on the east bank. In addition to that Ad-Damir in the north had become independent and several sub-branches of the Ja'alin became loose tributaries, like the Masallamab. In this period many Ja'alin, Danagla and Shaigiya became jallaba, wandering merchants who established themselves in Egypt, the Red Sea coast, Kordofan and Darfur.

=== Turkiyya (1821–1885) ===
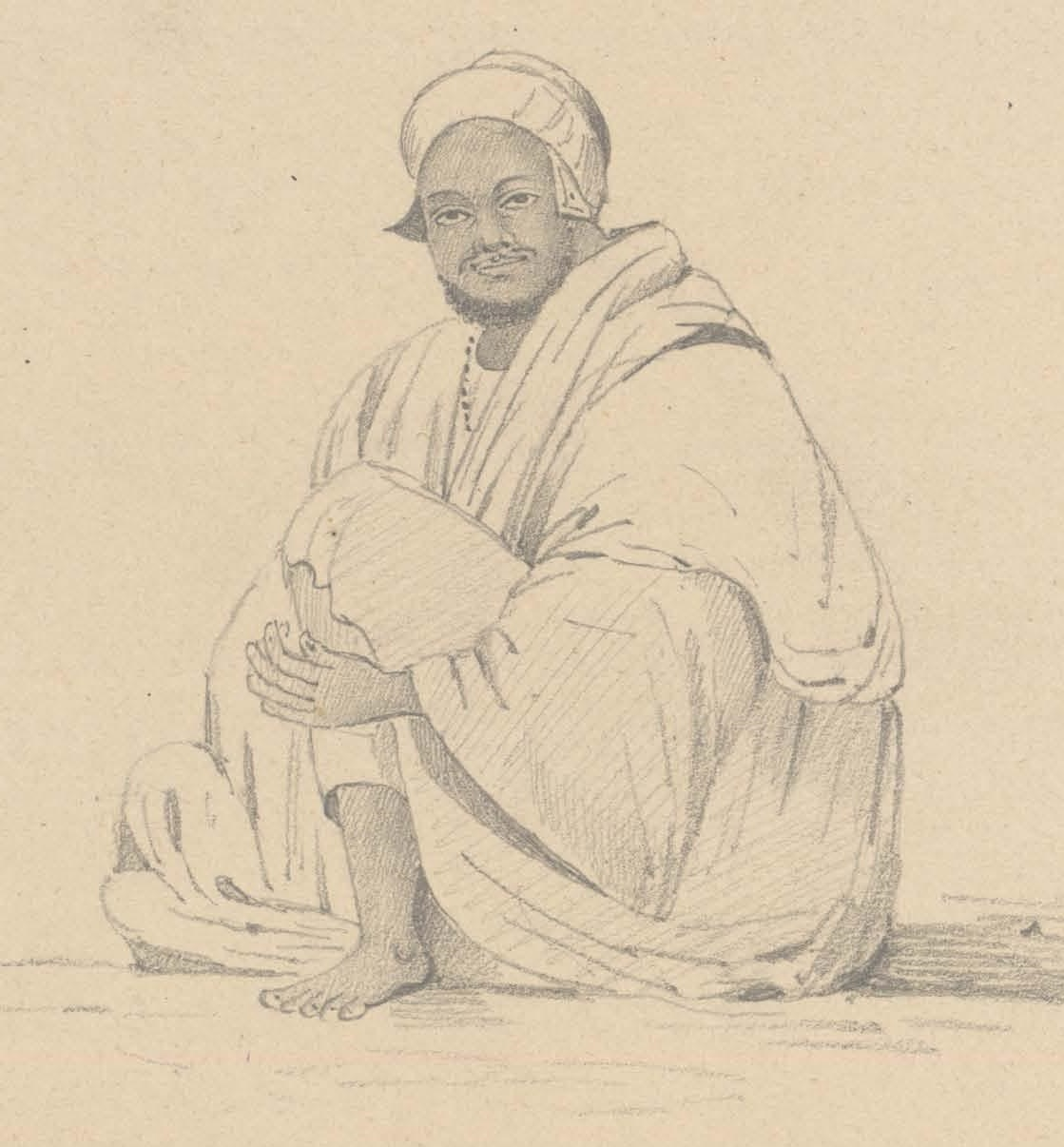
Drawing of Mek Nimr by Linant de Bellefonds, c. 1821

In 1820 the Turco-Egyptian ruler Muhammad Ali Pasha invaded Sudan with barely any resistance. In March 1821 the Turkish army, led by Muhammad Ali's son Isma'il Pasha, received the submission of makk Nimr of Shendi, which the army entered in May. Makk Nimr of Shendi and makk Musa'd of El Matamah were taken as hostages after four soldiers and several Ja'ali villagers were killed in a violent clash, but were soon allowed to return home. The Turks began to extort high taxes, often with brutal means. A meeting in November 1822 discussing taxes between Ibrahim Pasha, Nimr and Musa'd escalated when Ibrahim Pasha hit Nimr with a pipe. Ibrahim Pasha and his soldiers were burnt to death and much of central Sudan erupted in revolt. The revolt was crushed, Shendi and El Matamah pillaged and its population killed, while much of the countryside was depopulated. Captured Ja'alin risked to be mutilated and enslaved. Musa'd was killed while Nimr was defeated in battle in 1823 and fled to the Ethiopian borderlands, where his followers remained until the 1860s.

Under the Turkish regime Dar Ja'alin became part of a larger province centered around Berber, stretching from about the fourth cataract to the Nile confluence (until 1825) / the sixth cataract (after 1825). This province was in turn divided into several sub-districts, one of them based in El Matamah. All governors and district governors were Turks. The precolonial Ja'ali elite lost all its relevance and Ja'alin were only allowed to low-level positions, where they faced competition from Shaigi settlers. One exception of a Ja'ali acquiring some influence was Bashir Ahmad 'Aqid, a Musallamabi sheikh who betrayed makk Nimr during the revolt. The Turks rewarded him with the title "Sheikh of Sheikhs" (the nominal figurehead of the Ja'alin) and in the 1820s and 1830s he grew to become a rich landlord based in Shendi.

Many Ja'ali migrants and jallaba went south and settled in various towns like Khartoum, Kordofan, Karkoj or Gallabat. Ja'ali merchants competed against the Danagla, whom they eventually surpassed by about 1860. One prominent example was Zubayr Pasha, who started his career as a merchant in Bahr al-Ghazal, but eventually raised a slave army and conquered Darfur in 1874. Cracking down on slavery, Gordon Pasha abolished Zubayr's army and dispossed the jallaba, of which the Ja'alin were possibly the principal sufferers. Another wealthy Ja'ali "merchant-prince" who migrated to Kordofan and rose to prominence in this period was Ilyas Pasha Um Barir. Um Barir, originally a Ja'ali from Shendi, and a relative of the Emir Abdelsalam Haj Bala of the Mahdist State, became one of the wealthiest traders, even rivalling Zubayr Pasha. His domination of the region's trade routes, and powerful place in society eventually saw him appointed Governor of Kordofan by Governor General Charles Gordon. His dismissal however, in favor of the Egyptian Mohamed Pasha Said, among other issues, caused him to become one of the most instrumental figures in the successful Mahdist War's capture of El-Obeid, considered a central trading hub.

=== Mahdiyya (1885–1898) ===
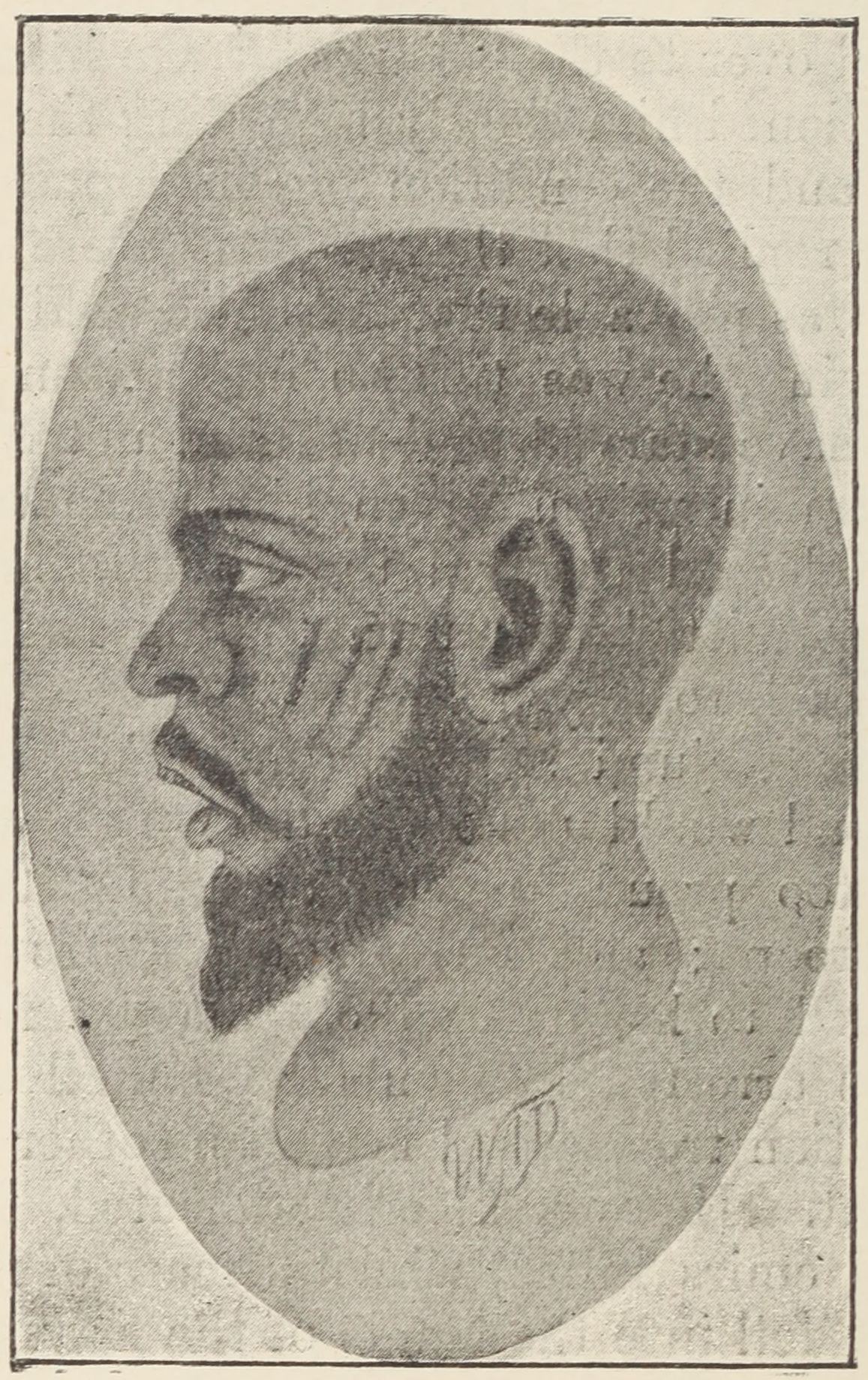
Portrait of Wad el Nujumi, a Mahdist "Amir" (high-ranking general) who died at the Battle of Toski in 1889

In 1881 Dongolawi cleric Muhammad Ahmad proclaimed himself to be the Mahdi. From his base in Kordofan he recruited various anti-government forces, among them Ja'alin like Ilyas Pasha Um Barir and Abdelsalam Haj Bala. Dar Ja'alin remained neutral until 1884, when it revolted against the government and welcomed Mahdist forces. A year later the Mahdists conquered Khartoum, the capital of Turkish Sudan. In 1889 the Mahdists, now ruled by Abdallahi ibn Muhammad, mustered an army led by the Ja'ali general Wad el Nujumi to invade Egypt, but were soundly defeated at the Battle of Toski.

The Anglo-Egyptian re-conquest of the Sudan began in 1896. In July 1897 Ja'alin tribal leaders refused to allow the Mahdist forces to occupy the Ja’alin town of Metemmeh, a strategic point on the Nile, 180 kilometres downstream of Omdurman. They feared the occupation would be oppressive, threatening both lives and property. After the Khalifa refused an offer from their leaders for the Ja’alin themselves to protect this stretch of the Nile from advancing Anglo-Egyptian forces, the Ja'alin leaders requested protection from General Kitchener, commander of the Anglo-Egyptian army. In response, the Mahdist forces attacked Metemmeh, killing several thousand Ja’alin, including women and children, with the killings continuing in the following year. As a consequence, Ja’alin tribesmen supported the Anglo-Egyptian forces on their advance on Omdurman in 1898, including supplying an irregular force of 2,500 cavalry, which helped clear the east bank of the Nile of Mahdist fighters in the days before the Battle of Omdurman.

== Location ==
This group of over 2.8 million people live in cities and large towns along the banks of the Nile River, especially in the ancient town of Shendi which has historically served as their tribal capital. The area is very hot and dry, with an average yearly rainfall of about three inches. In the summer, which lasts from April through November, daytime temperatures can reach as high as 120 to 130 °F (49 to 54 °C).

== Lifestyle ==
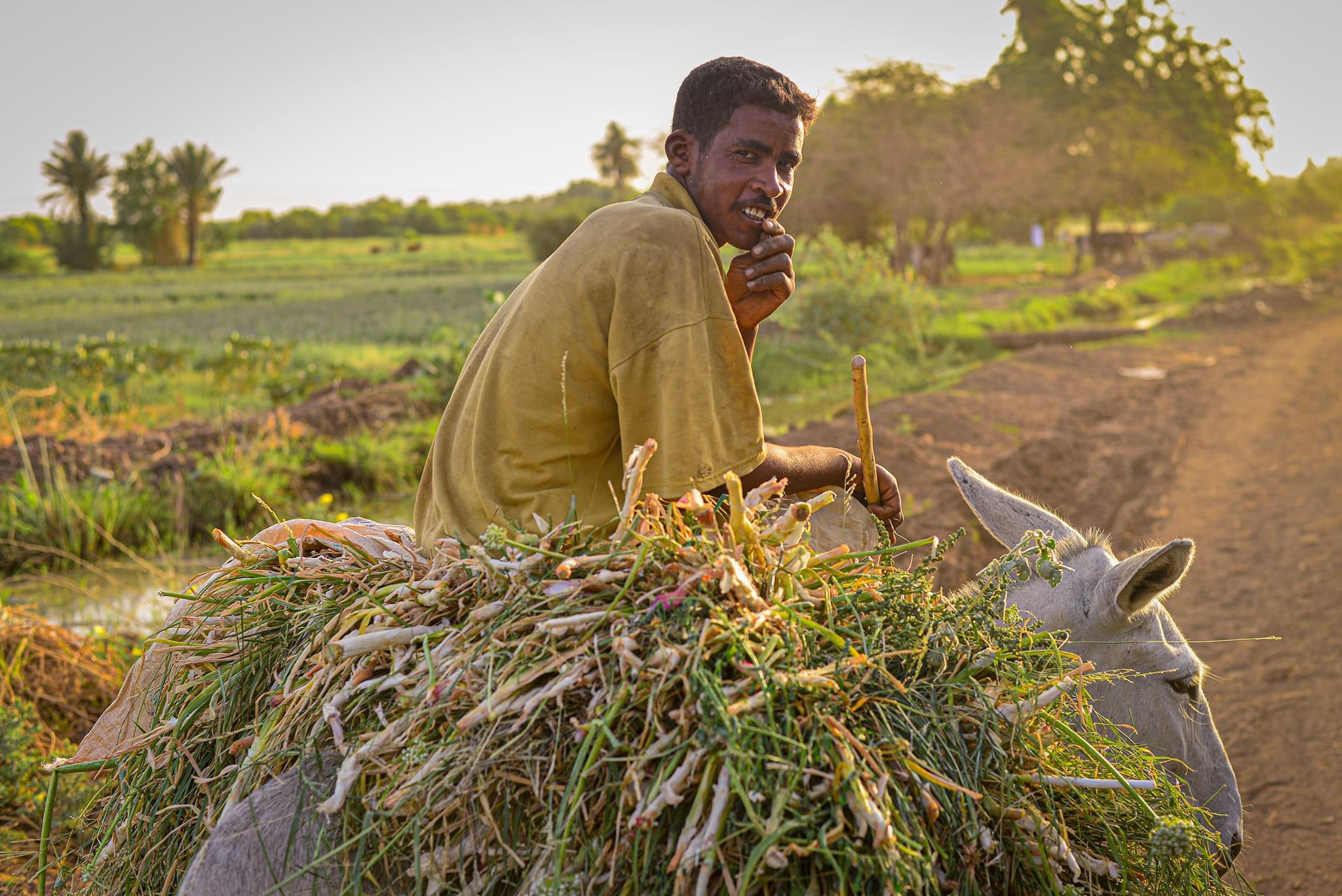
Man riding a donkey in Shendi

Some Ja'alin still farm and raise livestock along the banks of the Nile River, but in the 21st century, they more commonly make up a large part of the Sudanese urban population, forming a large part of the merchant class. Although many have moved to cities, such as the Sudanese capital of Khartoum, they still maintain their tribal identity and solidarity. Famous for maintaining ties with their origins, they keep in contact with their original home and return for frequent visits, especially for marriages, funerals and Muslim festivals.

While a dowry is still common among the Ja'alin and other peoples in the region, but the giving of land and livestock as part of the dowry disappeared in the early 20th century, with the last recorded such dowry dating from 1917 and the last oral evidence from 1930.

== Language ==
The Ja'alin entirely speak Sudanese Arabic. In 1888, Wilson claimed that the Arabic spoken in Sudan was "a pure but archaic Arabic". The pronunciation of certain letters was like Hijazi, and not Egyptian, such as g being the pronunciation for the Arabic letter Qāf and J being the pronunciation for Jeem. According to a source, the tribe allegedly once spoke a now extinct dialect of Nubian as late as the nineteenth century.

Makk Nimr and makk Musa'd were able to speak Beja.

== Sub-groups ==
Historically, a small group called the Meyrifab was sometimes classed with the Ja'alin, but the Ja'alin themselves rejected this inclusion.further south the Abdallabi tribe whose native heartland is khartoum state and Gezira State in central Sudan are loosely associated with the broader Ja'alin tribal confederation

== Notable tribe members ==
- Mek Nimr
- Zubayr Pasha
- Omar al-Bashir
- Abdel Fattah al-Burhan
- Sirr Al-Khatim Al-Khalifa

== See also ==
- Shaigiya tribe
- Rubatab tribe
- Danagla

== Literature ==
- Adams, William Y. (1977). Nubia. Corridor to Africa. Princeton University. ISBN 0691093709.
- Beška, Emanuel (2019). "Muhammad Ali´s Conquest of Sudan (1820-1824)". African and Asian Studies. 28(1): 30–56.
- Bjørkelo, Anders (2003). Prelude to the Mahdiyya: Peasants and Traders in the Shendi Region, 1821-1885. Cambridge University.
- Bruce, James (1813). Travels to discover the source of the Nile, in the years 1768, 1769, 1770, 1771, 1772, & 1773. Vol. 6. George Ramsay and Company.
- Gerhards, Gabriel (2023). "Präarabische Sprachen der Ja'aliyin und Ababde in der europäischen Literatur des 19. Jahrhunderts". Der Antike Sudan (in German). 34. Sudanarchäologische Gesellschaft zu Berlin e.V: 135–152.
- Holt, P. M. (1970). "The Nilotic Sudan". In P. M. Holt; Ann K. S. Lambton; Bernard Lewis (eds.). The Cambridge History of Islam. Vol. 2A. Cambridge University.
- Holt, P. M. (1960). "A Sudanese Historical Legend: The Funj Conquest of Sūba". Bulletin of the School of Oriental and African Studies. 23, 1: 1–12.
- Holt, Peter Malcolm; Daly, M.W. (2000). A History of the Sudan: From the Coming of Islam to the Present Day. Longman. ISBN 9780582368866.
- Ibrahim, Abdullahi Ali (1988). "Breaking the Pen of Harold Macmichael: The Ja'aliyyin Identity Revisited". The International Journal of African Historical Studies. 21 (2). African Studies Center: 217–231. doi:10.2307/219934. JSTOR 219934.
- Kramer, Robert S.; Lobban, Richard A. Jr.; Fluehr-Lobban, Carolyn (2013). Historical Dictionary of the Sudan. The Scarecrow. ISBN 978-0810861800.
- MacMichael, Harold (1922). A History of the Arabs in the Sudan. Vol. 2. Cambridge University.
- O'Fahey, R.S.; Spaulding, J.L (1974). Kingdoms of the Sudan. London: Methuen. ISBN 0-416-77450-4.
- Spaulding, Jay; Abū Salīm, Muḥammad Ibrāhīm (1989). Public Documents from Sinnār. Michigan State University.
- Vantini, Giovanni (2006). "Some new light on the end of Soba". In Alessandro Roccati and Isabella Caneva (ed.). Acta Nubica. Proceedings of the X International Conference of Nubian Studies Rome 9–14 September 2002. Libreria Dello Stato. pp. 487–491. ISBN 978-88-240-1314-7.
- Wilson, Sir Charles W. (1888). "On the Tribes of the Nile Valley, North of Khartum" (PDF). Journal of the Royal Anthropological Institute of Great Britain and Ireland. 17: 3–25.
