= Darfur campaign =

Darfur campaign may refer to:

- Invasion of Darfur (1821)
- Conquest of Darfur (1873–1874)
- Invasion of Darfur (1916)
- War in Darfur (2003–2020)
  - Darfur genocide (2003–2005)
- Darfur campaign (2023–present)
