= Carl Christian Giegler =

German-born telegraph engineer and colonial official (1844–1921)

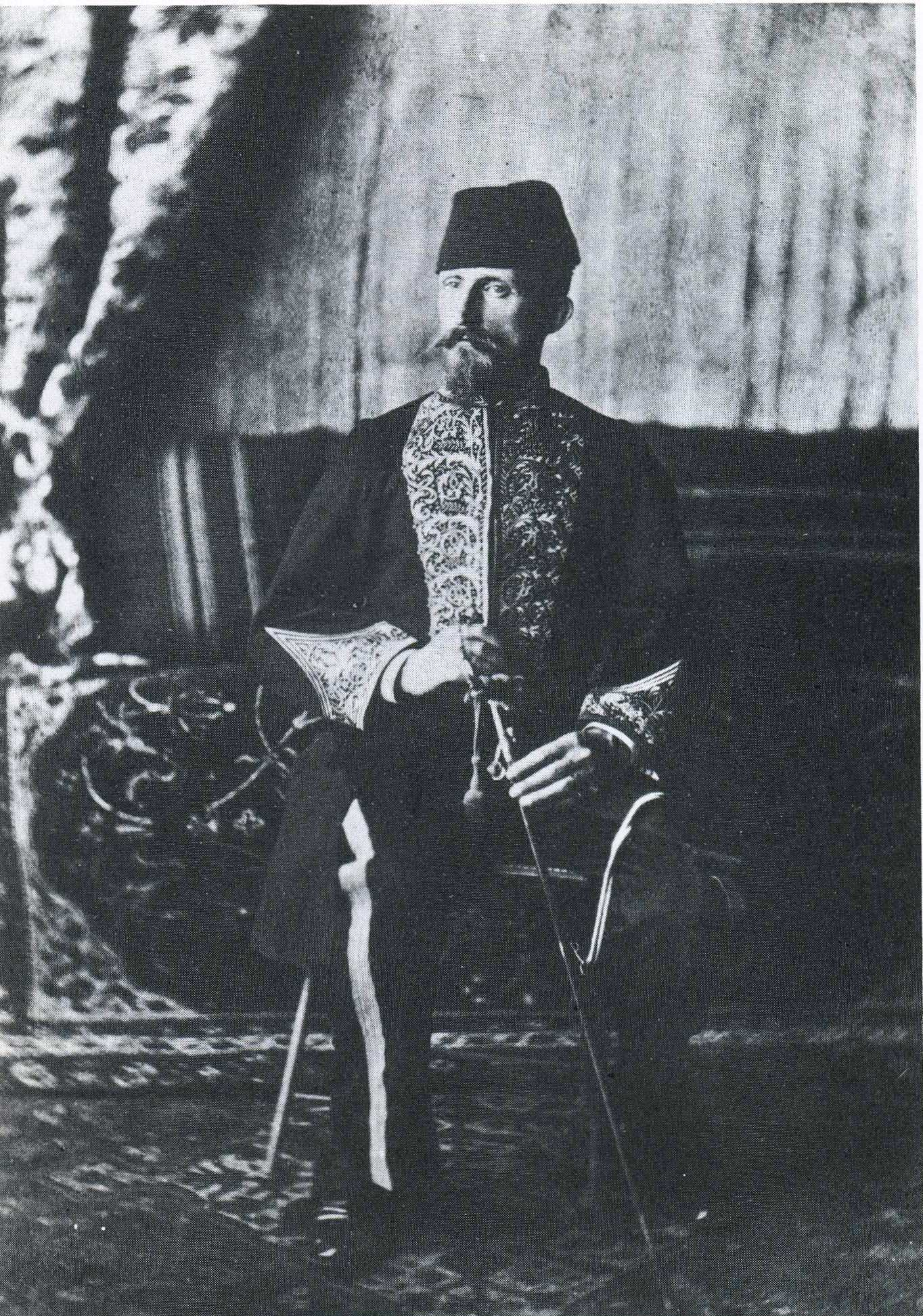
- Giegler Pasha in 1883

Acting Governor-General of Sudan
- In office 4 March 1882 – 11 May 1882
- Preceded by: Muhammad Rauf Pasha
- Succeeded by: Abdel Qadir Pasha Hilmi

Personal details
- Born: 4 January 1844 Schweinfurt, Kingdom of Bavaria
- Died: 31 August 1921 (aged 77) Schweinfurt, Free State of Bavaria, Weimar Republic
- Occupation: Engineer

Carl Christian Giegler (or Giegler Pasha; 4 January 1844 – 31 August 1921) was a German-born telegraph engineer who acted as governor-general of the Egyptian province of Sudan from February to May 1882 around the start of the Mahdist War.

== Early years ==
Karl Giegler was born in 1844 in Schweinfurt, Bavaria. He became a watchmaker, then found work with Siemens in their factory for telegraphic equipment in Woolwich, in southeast London, England. In 1872, bored and frustrated, he jumped at the chance to take a job building telegraph lines in the Sudan.

== Sudan telegraphic service ==
Giegler became an officer of the Sudan telegraph administration in 1873. On his journey to Khartoum Giegler visited almost all the known monuments from ancient Egyptian times, wanting "to see the magnificent and sublime remains of a vanished cultural epoch". He spent two days in Luxor, and later visited Philae and Abu Simbel, and the pyramids of Nuri and Jebel Barkal in June 1873. He reached Khartoum in July 1873. In 1874 Giegler made an inspection tour of the telegraph line to the north, and on his way back visited the ruins of Meroë.

Giegler avoided the temptations that Khartoum had to offer, did not participate in illegal trade and political intrigue, did his work and invested his earnings. After three years he renewed his contract. In 1875 Giegler became director of telegraphs in Khartoum. In 1876 Wilhelm Junker, the German-Russian explorer, passed through Khartoum where he met Giegler at the house of the Austrian consul Martin Hansel. Giegler was a tall man, had a red beard and could be taken for an Englishman. In 1878 he was appointed director-general of Sudan Telegraphs. That year he was also appointed director of the Sudan postal service. Giegler served in the telegraph service of the Sudan until 1883.

== Sudan administration ==
Charles George Gordon Pasha was appointed governor-general of the Sudan, taking office in Khartoum on 5 May 1877. He and Giegler did not get on well, and Giegler considered resigning, but Gordon named Giegler deputy governor-general of the Sudan. He held this position after Gordon resigned in 1880. Some said that Giegler was known to sometimes accept bribes. This may have just been a slander by his personal enemies. If true, he was not the only member of Gordon's entourage to engage in dubious practices. Romolo Gessi speculated in various commodities, and others were thought to trade in slaves.

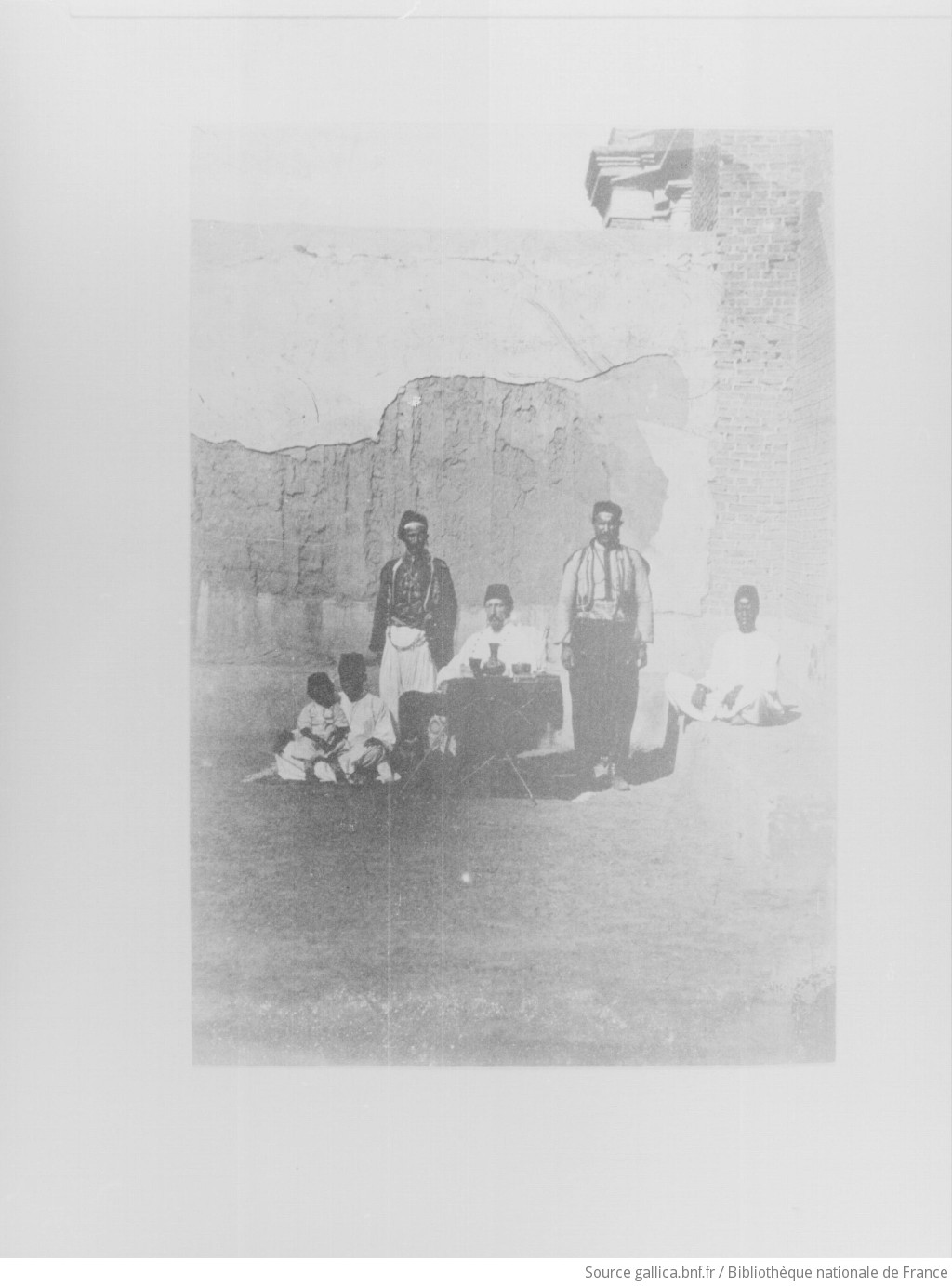
Giegler in Khartoum (sitting in the centre), photographed by French consul Louis Vossion in 1882.

Giegler was deputy governor-general from 1879 to 1882 under Gordon, Muhammad Rauf Pasha and 'Abd al-Qadir Hilmi. Giegler did not understand the religious significance of the Mahdist revolt and was inclined to downplay it, as were the British in Egypt. He was in El Obeid in June 1881 when Mahdism first emerged, and wrote, "I was not greatly impressed by the news. Much more serious happenings had taken place from time to time ... the least of which presented a danger more serious than the appearance of one of these religious fanatics...". After Rauf had failed to defeat the Mahdi on Aba Island, Giegler wrote,

The right thing to do would have been to ignore the whole matter. He must have known that, in the past, religious fanatics had tried more brazenly and with even larger numbers of followers to make themselves important. Since, however, the Government did not follow this line it came perforce to nothing.

Giegler Pasha was acting governor-general after Rauf Pasha had been dismissed in February 1882 and before his replacement 'Abd al-Qadir arrived in May 1882. Giegler became acting governor-general on 4 March 1882. After taking office he sent a telegram to Cairo in which he said that the forces at his disposal were easily enough to handle the Mahdist revolt, and he did not require reinforcements. He sent Yusuf Pasha Hasan al-Shallili, governor of Sennar, to attack Jabal Qadir with a force of 3,000 men. When these troops left, an amiyr al-mahdiy launched a rebellion. Giegler used irregulars to suppress the revolt. Giegler prevented Mahdism from spreading in the Gezira, but was wrong to assume that the local forces led by al-Shallali could destroy the main Mahdist force. The new governor-general Fariq Abdel Qadir Pasha Hilmi arrived in Khartoum on 11 May 1882. At the end of May al-Shallili's force was destroyed by Mahdists at Jabal Qadir.

Giegler was dismissed as deputy governor-general in June 1882 and was made inspector-general for the suppression of slavery. For a short time he was again deputy governor-general, then finally left the Sudan in March 1883.

== Later career ==
In 1883 Giegler became a member of the Suez Canal Company. On 26 January 1884, Giegler, Gordon Pascha, Evelyn Baring and Evelyn Wood met the former slave trader Al-Zubayr Rahma Mansur to urge him to cooperate against the Mahdi and to offer him the position of governor. The appointment of Zubayr was rejected by the government in London, which did not want to see a former slave trader at the head of Sudan.

Giegler returned to Germany in 1893. Between 1897 and 1904 he wrote his memoirs, drawing on diary notes and reports of his many journeys. He does not seem to have considered publication, but just wanted to leave a record of his eventful life for his descendants. In his memoirs he gave an unflattering portrait of Gordan, and described his pettiness and self-indulgence. He wrote that Giacomo Messedaglia was "a rascal and a knave ... a crook to the end", while Romolo Gessi was "capable of the worst and basest actions". He wrote of Colonel Hicks and his officers that "It would be difficult ... to gather together again such as bundle of incompetents." However, he described Frank Lupton as "one of the few Englishmen in the Sudan who were of any use."

Giegler died in Schweinfurt in 1921.

== Publications ==
- Giegler, Carl Christian (1984), Hill, Richard (ed.), The Sudan Memoirs of Carl Christian Giegler Pasha 1873–1883, London, p. 231, ISBN 0197260284

== Sources ==
- Daly, M. W. (1987), "The Sudan Memoirs of Carl Christian Giegler Pasha 1873–1883 by Richard Hill, Thirza Küpper, Carl Christian Giegler Pasha", Bulletin of the School of Oriental and African Studies, University of London (review), 50 [1], Cambridge University Press on behalf of School of Oriental and African Studies: 139–141, doi:10.1017/S0041977X00053398, JSTOR 616914
- Daly, M. W. (2010), Darfur's Sorrow: The Forgotten History of a Humanitarian Disaster (2 ed.), Cambridge University Press, ISBN 978-1-139-78849-6
- Ellens, J. Harold, ed. (2013), Winning Revolutions: The Psychosocial Dynamics of Revolts for Freedom, Fairness, and Rights [3 volumes]: The Psychosocial Dynamics of Revolts for Freedom, Fairness, and Rights, ABC-CLIO, ISBN 978-1-4408-0373-4
- Herzog, Rolf (18 May 2020), "Die Fundumstānde einer meroitischen Statuengruppe", in Erika Endesfelder; Karl-Heinz Priese; Walter-Friedrich Reineke; Steffen Wenig (eds.), Ägypten und Kusch (in German), Walter de Gruyter GmbH & Co KG, ISBN 978-3-11-232080-8, OCLC 1158110145
- Moore-Harell, Alice (2013), Gordon and the Sudan: Prologue to the Mahdiyya 1877–1880, Routledge, ISBN 978-1-135-27006-3
- Pleticha, H. (1981), Der Mahdiaufstand in Augenzeugenberichten (in German), Düsseldorf
- Thomas, Frederic C. (2009), Slavery and Jihad in the Sudan: A Narrative of the Slave Trade, Gordon and Mahdism, and Its Legacy Today, iUniverse, ISBN 978-1-4401-2259-0, OCLC 1109983878
- Warburg, Gabriel (1992), Historical Discord in the Nile Valley, Hurst, ISBN 978-1-85065-140-6, OCLC 246515317
- Warburg, Gabriel (2003), Islam, Sectarianism and Politics in Sudan Since the Mahdiyya, C. Hurst, ISBN 978-1-85065-588-6, OCLC 1003144867
