= Gimma people =

Gimma are an ethnic group of Northern Sudan. They are a subgroup of the Ja'alin, an Arabized Nubian people. They speak Arabic and practice Islam. They are Sunni Muslims.
