= 'Abd al-Latif Pasha =

Ottoman governor general of the Sudan (c. 1805–1883)

'Abd al-Latif Pasha 'Abd Allah or simply Latif Pasha (c. 1805–1883) was a governor general of the Sudan from 1849 to 1852. He had been an admiral in the Ottoman Navy before succeeding Khalid Khusraw Pasha in Khartoum. He clashed with European powers and was recalled in 1852.

== Biography ==
Latif Pasha was a Circassians born at Nusretli in the Drama district and joined the Ottoman Navy where he became a frigate captain. He was sentenced to death during his naval career for losing his ship but was saved when French officers intervened. He was then posted to Khartoum and succeeded Khalid Khusraw Pasha on 13 February 1850 to become governor general of the Sudan. He clashed with Europeans whom he distrusted and considered as "evil liars". According to a British traveller named J. Hamilton he had misappropriated money from a European merchant.

Latif Pasha was removed supposedly due to a scandal involving him. He allegedly shot his Aide-de-Camp and a Greek friend of his wife and had their bodies secretly buried in the palace. Relatives of the woman took up the case with the Greek consul. He was removed on 14 January 1852 and replaced by Rustum Pasha. The Egyptian government also made navigation on the White Nile free of restrictions.

Latif Pasha worked as an inspector of dockyards in Bulaq around 1862–63 and managed steamers to Khartoum. He could speak some Italian. He retired to Cairo where he died.
