= Conquest of Darfur (1873–1874) =

Date	1873–1874
Location	Darfur, now part of Sudan 13°00′N 25°00′E
Result	Turco-Egyptian victory
Territorial changes	Darfur becomes a province of Sudan

Belligerents
Khedivate of Egypt	Sultanate of Darfur

Commanders and leaders
Isma'il Ayyub Pasha; al-Zubayr Rahma Mansur	Ibrahim Qarad †

Strength
7,000 (al-Zubayr)	

Casualties and losses
700+	

The conquest of Darfur by Turco-Egyptian armies in 1874 brought to an end the Sultanate of Darfur that had existed since the 16th century. It is a major event in the history of Sudan.

The war began in 1873 as a proxy war fought between factions of the Rizayqat tribe living in the southern borderlands between Darfur and the Turco-Egyptian province of the Bahr al-Ghazal. During this fighting, a caravan belonging to the trader al-Zubayr Rahma Mansur was attacked. After a troubled succession in Darfur in April 1873 and unsuccessful pursuit of a diplomatic solution, al-Zubayr moved against his Rizayqat rivals in southern Darfur in August. In November, al-Zubayr was appointed governor of the Bahr al-Ghazal, but he was not authorized to invade Darfur.

In December 1873, troops from Darfur began moving to restore control in the south. After some successes, they were defeated and al-Zubayr occupied the city of Dara in February 1874. At this juncture the Egyptian government declared war on Darfur, accusing it of aggression and of trading in slaves. The governor general of the Sudan, Isma'il Ayyub Pasha, was ordered to advance from the east through Kordofan while al-Zubayr continued his advance north. Between February and July, however, there was little movement on account of the dry weather. Final efforts at diplomacy on both sides yielded no results.

In July or August 1874, Darfur launched a counterattack. They besieged al-Zubayr in Dara but were beaten back. In October, the sultan of Darfur personally led an army south but was forced to retreat almost immediately in the face of al-Zubayr's superior weaponry, which included modern repeating rifles. At Manawashi on 25 October, he was defeated and killed. The capital of Darfur, al-Fashir, was occupied by al-Zubayr a week later. Within days, Isma'il Ayyub Pasha arrived and began establishing a Turco-Egyptian administration. Although the Darfur state collapsed, the reigning Keira dynasty did not completely submit, but continued to resist in the Marrah Mountains.

== Background ==
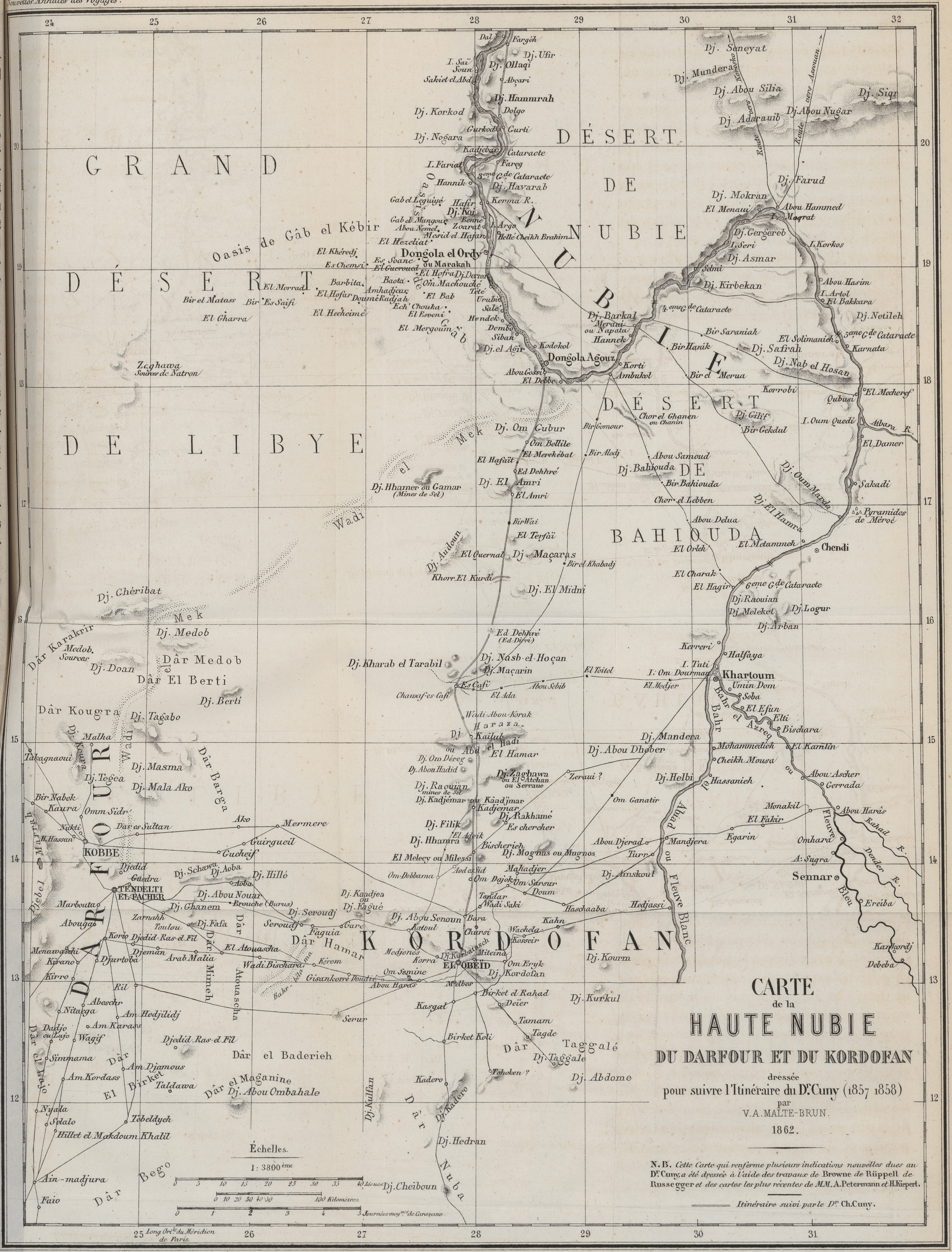
Nubia, Kordofan and Darfur as mapped in 1862

The Sultanate of Darfur reached its territorial peak under Muhammad Tayrab (r. 1752/3–1785/6), who incorporated Kordofan. In 1821, Egypt invaded Darfur and Kordofan was lost. In the ensuing decades, the khedives used espionage and propaganda against Darfur. Isma'il Pasha, in particular, presented the sultanate to the European powers as a bastion of the slave trade.

Following the Egyptian conquest of the Sudan (1820–1824), there was a gradual emigration of traders away from the Nile to escape the agricultural and taxation policies of the Egyptians. One of the most successful of these traders was al-Zubayr Rahma Mansur, who moved into the Bahr al-Ghazal in 1856 and effectively controlled it by 1865. He traded mainly in ivory and slaves. The anti-slavery policies of Egypt forced him to use as intermediaries the Baqqara nomads situated between his lands and Darfur to the north. Al-Zubayr, consequently, "is the villain in many accounts by European travelers and administrators". In 1866, he reached an agreement with the Rizayqat, a Baqqara tribe. Boxed out of the caravan trade, the Darfur elite saw a decline in their standard of living.

== Casus belli ==
By 1873, Sultan Muhammad al-Husayn had succeeded in pealing away a faction of the Rizayqat from al-Zubayr. This faction was led by Munzal and 'Ulayyan, while those who remained loyal to the treaty with al-Zubayr were led by Maddibub 'Ali and 'Uqayl walad al-Janqawi. In addition, the sultan imposed an embargo on grain exports to the south. After an attack on one of his caravans in which several of his relatives were killed, al-Zubayr began a diplomatic correspondence with the new sultan, Ibrahim Qarad, who had ascended the throne in April. His first letter was dated 17 June 1873. Although the accession of Ibrahim Qarad had been disturbed by an attempted palace coup backed by Ahmed Shatta, the sultan reappointed Shatta as maqdum of the south.

When al-Zubayr received no reply to his letter, he made war on the Rizayqat from 10 July until late August. The Rizayqat fought on horseback. The fighting was fierce and al-Zubayr lost some 700 men. He occupied Shakka (with his Rizayqat allies) on 25 August. In a letter to the sultan dated 8 September, al-Zubayr describes a great battle in which Munzal and 'Ulayyan were defeated. As they had fled to the sultan's court, he requests the sultan hand them over. Ibrahim did not respond, but wrote to Maddibub threatening vengeance on the "petty trader" al-Zubayr. This prompted another letter from al-Zubayr, dated 12 November, in which he advised the sultan to submit to the khedive. On 22 November, al-Zubayr was informed that the khedive had named him governor of Shakka and the Bahr al-Ghazal with the title of bey. Al-Zubayr decided to attack Darfur in response to the attacks on his carvans. The succession crisis provided him an opportune moment. According to Charles George Gordon, a foe of al-Zubayr, writing in 1879, he made this decision in contravention of orders from the Egyptian government.

== Opposing forces ==
The army of al-Zubayr was far superior to that of Darfur. It had extensive battle experience and many of its officers had served in the regular Egyptian army. Many of its recruits came from the Azande. Among its leading generals were al-Nur Muhammad Anqara, Hamdan Abu Anja, al-Zaki Tamal, Abd al-Rahman walad al-Nujumi and Rabih Fadl Allah. He also had regular troops supplied by the governor general of the Sudan, since he was governor of Shakka and the Bahr al-Ghazal. Many of his men were armed with Remington repeating rifles.

On the other hand, Darfur had not launched a military expedition beyond its borders since its intervention in the Sultanate of Wadai in 1836. Its army was a small force of heavy cavalry and slave troops engaged in internal security. Fighting with the Baqqara in the 1850s and 1860s proven this force inadequate, but Darfur had only just begun to improve increase its military capabilities—importing firearms and welcoming ex-Egyptian officers—when war with al-Zubayr broke out.

== War ==
=== Fall of Dara ===
In December 1873, Ahmad Shatta and the malik al-nahas, Sa'd al-Nur ibn Ibrahim Ramad, advanced into Rizayqat territory and defeated al-Nur Muhammad Anqara. He then wrote to al-Zubayr to open negotiations. The sultan, however, compelled him to advance. He fought two battles with al-Zubayr between Dara and Shakka in January–February 1874. In the second battle, he was killed along with the malik al-nahas and the maqdum of the west, Abd Allah Runa. As a result, al-Zubayr occupied Dara on 11 February. Before the end of the month, the khedive declared war on Darfur, stating as the casus belli the sultan's aggression and the ongoing trade in slaves. He ordered the governor general of the Sudan, Isma'il Ayyub Pasha, to prepare to invade Darfur from Kordofan. The khedive's primary purpose was to prevent the conquest of Darfur by al-Zubayr alone.

In the aftermath of Dara, Ahmad Nimr ibn Tayrab, shartay (chief) of the Birged, took command of the resistance and rallied the remnants of Shatta's army. Rabih Fadl Allah led a sortie that killed Ahmad Nimr. On 18 February, al-Zubayr wrote a letter to the ulama (Islamic leaders) of Darfur justifying his actions under shari'a (Islamic law) and demanding an explanation for the sultan's actions. Ibrahim did not respond, but wrote to the Awlad Jabir asking them to recite the Quran one thousand times for victory. Although only this letter survives, it was probably just one of many such missives requesting Quranic recitations for victory sent throughout Darfur.

=== Lull in fighting ===
At Dara, al-Zubayr called up reinforcements until he had 7,000 men armed with rifles. There was then a pause in the war until July, as al-Zubayr waited at Dara for the rainy season and Ibrahim vacillated in the Fur capital, al-Fashir. According to O'Fahey and Spaulding, "the vast distances and the difficulties of concentrating troops in an area of sparse grazing, water and food, made the campaigning very laborious."

Ibrahim attempted to bypass al-Zubayr by appealing directly to the khedive and his superior, the Ottoman sultan. The German explorer Gustav Nachtigal left al-Fashir on 2 July bearing a letter for the Ottoman grand vizier. Ibrahim claimed to have two Ottoman firmans guaranteeing his sovereignty, but this claim is dubious.

=== Darfur counterattacks ===
In July or August, the sultan sent his uncle, the emir Hasab Allah ibn Muhammad al-Fadl, south with an army. They besieged Dara, but were driven off by a sally and were defeated a second time trying to return, after which they retreated. On 16 August, al-Zubayr wrote a final letter to the sultan declaring his intention to annex Darfur on behalf of the khedive. On 17 August, Ibrahim wrote to the khedive offering submission. The letter was delivered by the merchant brothers Hamza Pasha Imam al-Khabir and Muhammad Pasha Imam al-Khabir, but it was too late. The army of Isma'il Ayyub Pasha was meanwhile advancing slowly across Kordofan. It captured Umm Shanqa in September.

After the defeat of Hasab Allah, Sultan Ibrahim appointed his son Muhammad as regent (khalifa) in al-Fashir and marched south himself. He arrived before Dara on 16 October and launched an attack immediately. It was the decisive battle of the war and the sultan was forced to retreat in the face of al-Zubayr's superior weapons. According to an Arabic note on the battle, the Fur "did not know of war with rifles". Ibrahim retreated towards the Marrah Mountains. He never made it. At Manawashi on 25 October, he was defeated and killed. He died on horseback charging the enemy with his bodyguard. The sacred drum called al-mansura ('the victorious') was captured. The sultan was buried in the mosque of Shaykh Tahir Abu Jamus in Manawashi.

Following Manawashi and with the Fur army in disarray, there was a race to al-Fashir. On 2 November, al-Zubayr entered al-Fashir. Isma'il Ayyub Pasha arrived two days later.

== Aftermath ==
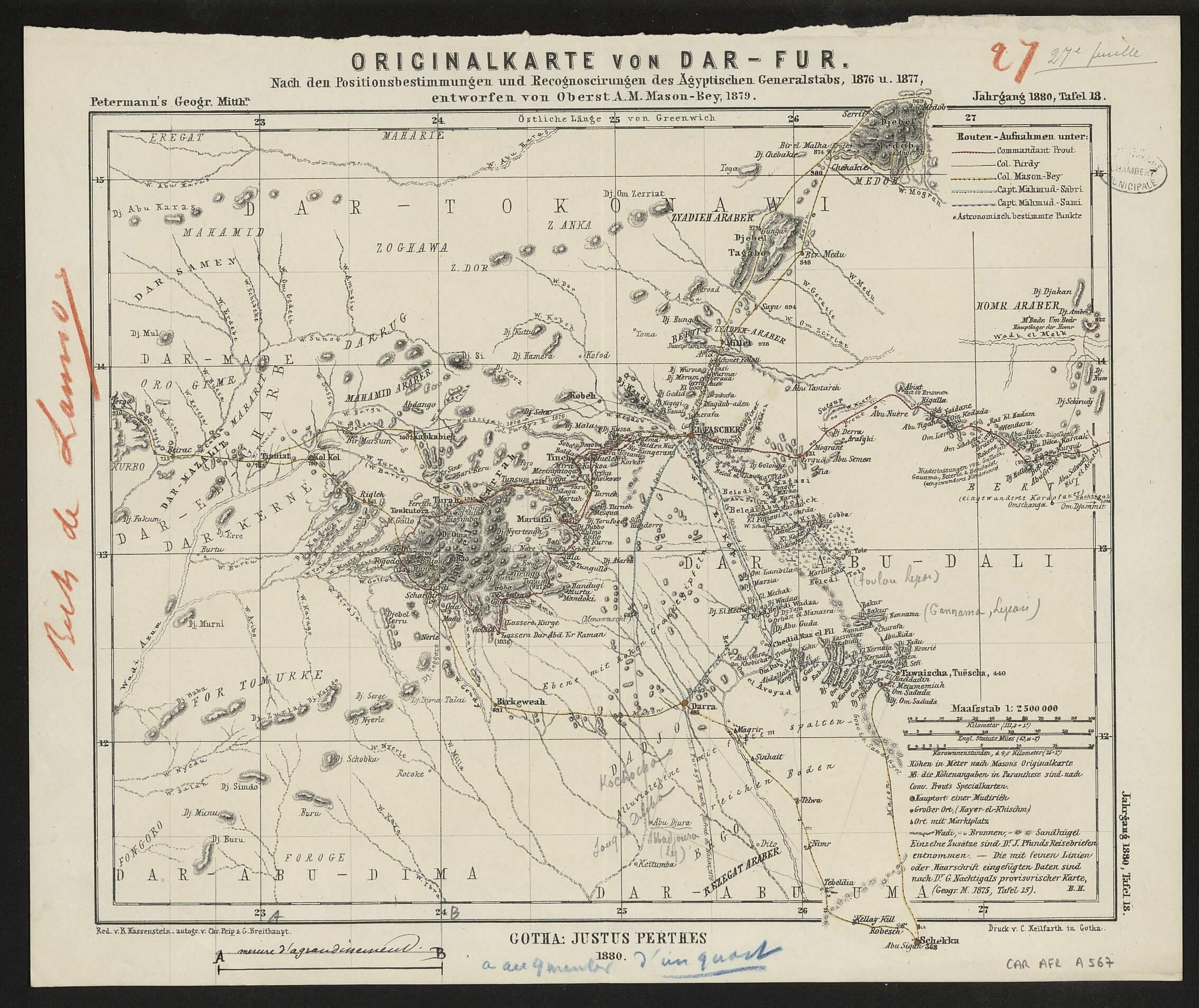
Map of Darfur made by the Egyptian general staff in 1876–1877

Al-Zubayr established control of Darfur up to the border with Wadai. The smaller sultanates of Dar Masalit, Dar Tima, Dar Qimr and Dar Sila were also occupied. Isma'il Ayyub Pasha immediately began setting up an administration in Darfur, converting the maqdumates into mudriiyyas under a governor general. The merchant brothers al-Khabir joined the new administration. The first governor of central Darfur was Hasan Hilmi Pasha.

Although the Darfur state collapsed, the Keira dynasty did not as a whole submit, although many members did. Hasab Allah took refuge in the Marrah Mountains, but was captured by al-Zubayr, who wanted to make him governor general. Ayyub refused. Bosh, son of Sultan Muhammad al-Fadl, proclaimed himself sultan and managed to control the mountains for a time before al-Zubayr forced him back to Kabkabiya, where he was defeated and killed. Al-Zubayr's campaigns depopulated several valleys. His rift with Ayyub widened until in June 1875 he went in person to Cairo to complain only to be detained.

The period of Turco-Egyptian rule in Darfur was short. By 1882, the land was being overrun by the revolutionary Mahdist State. With the Battle of Shaykan in 1883, the Turks lost control forever. Between 1874 and 1898, six "shadow sultans" of the Keira dynasty ruled in the mountains. After years of warfare with the Mahdists, the dynasty reestablished the sultanate in al-Fashir under Ali Dinar in 1898. This was finally conquered in 1916 and incorporated into the Anglo-Egyptian Sudan.

== Bibliography ==
- Bassil, Noah R. (2006). "The Rise and Demise of the Keira Sultanate of Dar Fur". Journal of North African Studies. 11 (4): 347–364. doi:10.1080/13629380601036098.
- Berman, Zachary S. (2017). Owing and Owning: Zubayr Pasha, Slavery, and Empire in Nineteenth-Century Sudan (PhD dissertation). The City University of New York.
- Collins, Robert O. (2006). "The Disaster in Darfur in Historical Perspective" (PDF). Journal of Conflict Studies. 26 (2): 25–43.
- Daly, M. W. (2010). Darfur's Sorrow: The Forgotten History of a Humanitarian Disaster (2nd ed.). Cambridge University Press.
- Jackson, H. C. (1913). Black Ivory and White: Or the Story of El Zubeir Pasha, Slaver and Sultan as Told by Himself. B. H. Blackwell.
- Nachtigal, Gustav (1971) [1889]. Sahara and Sudan, Volume 4: Wadai and Darfur. Translated by Allan G. B. Fisher; Humphrey J. Fisher. University of California Press.
- O'Fahey, R. S.; Spaulding, J. L. (1974). Kingdoms of the Sudan. Methuen.
- O'Fahey, R. S. (1997). "The Conquest of Darfur, 1873–1882". Sudan Notes and Records. New Series. 1 (1): 47–67. JSTOR 44947726.
