= Manawashi =

Village in Sudan

Manawashi منواشي
- Village
- Location within Sudan
- Coordinates: 12°41′20″N 24°59′42″E
- Country: Sudan
- State: South Darfur
- Time zone: UTC+2 (CAT)

Manawashi or al-Manawashi (Arabic: منواشي) is a village in South Darfur, Sudan.

== History ==
In the 1870s, the Battle of al-Manawashi was fought in Darfur between the Khedivate of Egypt and the Sultanate of Darfur. In 2023 when the Sudanese civil war broke out, clashes were reported in Manawashi between the Sudanese Armed Forces and the Rapid Support Forces. Deadly clashes between resulted in 10 farmers killed and 7 injured. On 4 September 2025, a person was reportedly killed in a drone strike on a market in Manawashi.
