= Richard Leslie Hill =

English civil servant and historian of Sudan

Richard Leslie Hill (18 February 1901 – 21 March 1996) was an English civil servant and historian of Sudan, "one of the great pioneers in the study of the modern history of the Sudan". Lecturer in Near Eastern history at Durham University from 1949 to 1966, he established the Sudan Archive there, "one of the most remarkable initiatives by any British university".

== Works ==
Hill's books fall into three main classes: reference works, editions of 19th-century memoirs or travel journals, and synthesising monographs.

- Toryism and the people, 1832–1846, 1929
- A bibliography of the Anglo-Egyptian Sudan, from the earliest times to 1937, 1939
- A biographical dictionary of the Sudan, 1951. 2nd ed., 1967
- Egypt in the Sudan, 1820–1881, 1959
- Slatin Pasha, 1965
- Sudan transport; a history of railway, marine and river services in the Republic of the Sudan, 1965
- (ed.) On the frontiers of Islam: two manuscripts concerning the Sudan under Turco-Egyptian rule, 1822–1845, 1970
- (ed. with Elias Toniolo) The Opening of the Nile Basin: writings by members of the Catholic Mission to Central Africa on the geography and ethnography of the Sudan, 1842–1881, 1975
- (tr. and ed. with Paul Santi) The Europeans in the Sudan, 1834–1878: some manuscripts, mostly unpublished, 1980
- (ed.) The Sudan memoirs of Carl Christian Giegler Pasha, 1873–1883, 1984.
- (with Peter C. Hogg) A Black corps d'élite: an Egyptian Sudanese conscript battalion with the French Army in Mexico, 1863–1867, and its survivors in subsequent African history, 1994
