= William Fraser Hume =

British geologist (1867–1949)

Dr. William Fraser Hume FRSE (1867–1949) was a British geologist specialising in Egypt.

== Life ==
He was born in Cheltenham in England on 1 October 1867 the son of George Hume.

He received his early education in Russia and at College Galliard in Lausanne in Switzerland. He then attended the Royal College of Science and Royal College of Mines in the University of London under John Wesley Judd graduating BSc around 1887. He began lecturing at the Royal College of Science in 1890 and received a doctorate (DSc) in 1893.

In 1897, he moved to Egypt to assist with a huge geological survey of the whole country and in 1909 became Director of the entire Geological Survey of Egypt. In 1910, he was elected a Fellow of the Royal Society of Edinburgh. His proposers were John Horne, Ben Peach, John Walter Gregory, Sir John Smith Flett and James Ireland.

During the First World War he advised on water supply to the British Army in Egypt and the Middle East. He was awarded the Lyell Medal by the Geological Society of London in 1919.

He served as president of the Royal Geographical Society of Egypt from December 1926 to May 1946. and as president of the Institute of Egypt in 1928.

He retired in 1927 and returned to England to Sussex around 1930 and died there on 23 February 1949. He is buried in Littlehampton Cemetery.

== Publications ==
- Rift Valleys and Geology of the Eastern Sinai (1901)
- The Topography and Geology of the Peninsula of Sinai (1906)
- Report on the Oilfield Region of Egypt (1916)
- Geology of Egypt (1925)
- Phosphate Deposits in Egypt (1927)

== Family ==
He married Ethel Gladys Williams.
