= Nanıc =

- Location within Azerbaijan
- Coordinates: 40°53′32″N 48°19′30″E
- Country: Azerbaijan
- Rayon: Ismailli
- Municipality: Müdri
- Time zone: UTC+4 (AZT)
  - Summer (DST): UTC+5 (AZT)

Nanıc (also, Kanyl’ and Nanuch) is a village in the Ismailli Rayon of Azerbaijan. The village forms part of the municipality of Müdri.
