= Maqdum =

Title in the Darfur Sultanate

Maqdūm was a title in the Darfur Sultanate, roughly corresponding to "viceroy". It was created in the early 19th century originally for those put in charge of military campaigns against the nomadic peoples living along the periphery of Darfur. As viceroys, the maqdūms were given certain trappings of royalty at their appointment, including royal insignia, a copy of the Qurʾān, a carpet, a stool and a lance. The maqdūm had military forces at his disposal and also qāḍīs (judges) in his entourage. Gustav Nachtigal, who travelled through Darfur in 1874, described the position thus:

In order to obviate any kind of encraochment on his authority, the king from time to time sent commissioners into the provinces, who, in some measure representing the king in person, took charge of the supervision of affairs there. During their period of offic[e], these commissioners, maqdum, were furnished with the external marks of royal dignity and exercised supreme authority. The appointment of a maqdum was usually for two or three years, and only in the northern province had there for a long time been any permanent maqdum. Any officials, whether slaves or free men, could be appointed to this office, and after completing their mission they returned to their former position.

Through grants of land, which came to be seen as hereditary, and through intermarriage with local elites, the maqdūms could become closely identified with their regions. The maqdūmate of the north became hereditary. The maqdūm of the south was "a very mobile warlord" engaged in constant conflict with the Baggara over the coveted slave trade.

Following the Turco-Egyptian conquest of Darfur in 1874, the maqdūmates fell into abeyance. They were revived by Sultan Ali Dinar after 1898, but did not attain their former prominence. The Anglo-Egyptian administration after 1926 attempted to revive the maqdūmates, but the experiment was dead by 1949.
