= Muhammad Rauf Pasha =

Egyptian general and colonial administrator (c. 1832–1888)

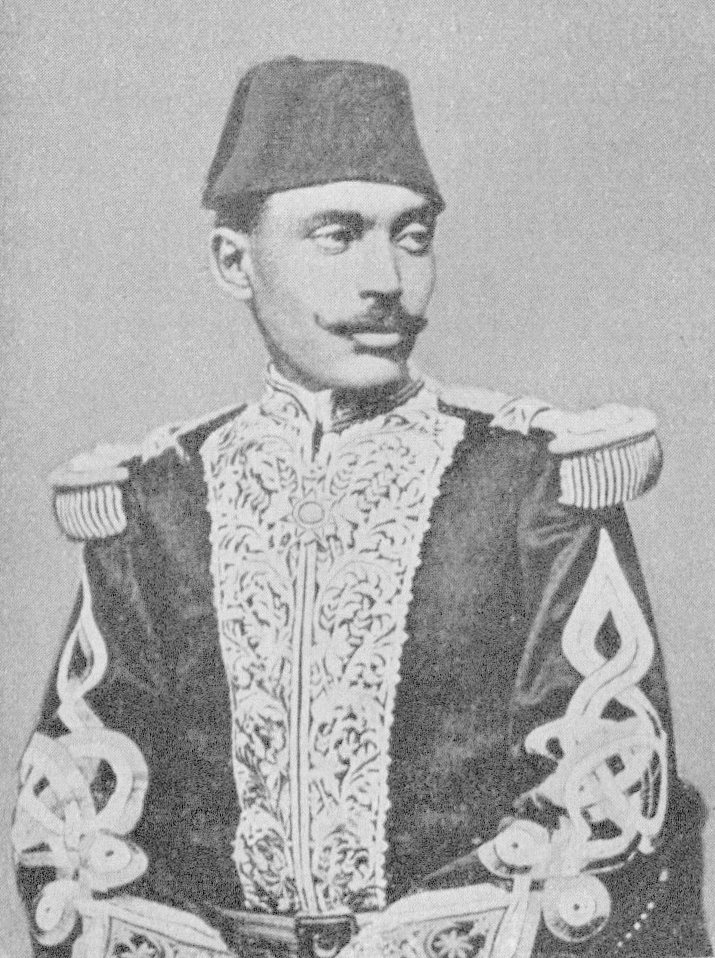

Governor of Equatoria
- In office August 1873 – March 1874
- Preceded by: Samuel Baker Pasha
- Succeeded by: Charles George Gordon Pasha

Governor of Harar
- In office October 1875 – 1878
- Preceded by: Muhammad ibn Ali Abd ash-Shakur (Emir)
- Succeeded by: Raduan Pasha

Governor General of Sudan
- In office 1880–1882
- Preceded by: Charles George Gordon
- Succeeded by: Fariq Abdel Qadir Pasha Hilmi

Personal details
- Born: c. 1832 Minya, Egypt Eyalet, Ottoman Empire
- Died: 1888 Minya, Khedivate of Egypt
- Occupation: Soldier and colonial administrator

Military service
- Branch/service: Egyptian Army

Muhammad Rauf Pasha (c. 1832 – 1888) was an Egyptian general and colonial administrator who served in turn as governor of Equatoria and Harar, and governor general of Sudan.

== Early career ==
Muhammad Rauf Pasha was born in 1832, to an Ethiopian mother and either a Nubian or Berber father. Nevertheless he was an Egyptian officer who rose through the ranks of the country's military in contrast to foreign mercenaries hired by the Khedive. He was from Minya.

He rose in the army, accepting posts in a difficult region that most Egyptian officers did their best to avoid but which he saw as presenting opportunity. Rauf Pasha became a general in the Egyptian army. He had considerable experience in Sudan, but was considered mediocre by the British. One historian said dryly that he was envied "for his skill at baccarat".

While a young officer Rauf Bey was chief of staff to Samuel Baker in Equatoria. On 23 January 1872 Baker left Rauf Bey with 340 men to garrison Ismailia (Note: Ismailia: Baker's headquarters in Equatoria, not be confused with Ismailia in Egypt.) while he undertook an expedition to the far south of Equatoria. When Baker returned on 1 April 1873 the station seemed neglected, although the gardens had been looked after well. Rauf Bey had proved capable, and had led an attack on the Belinian Bari to recover some deserters. Rauf was appointed governor of Equatoria in August 1873, succeeding Samuel Baker Pasha, and was succeeded by Charles George Gordon in March 1874. Gordon wrote to Baker of 1 October 1875, "Rauf Pasha (when at Ismailia) let all discipline go to the dogs; and I do not wonder at it: for unpaid and uncared-for soldiers will never be amenable to discipline..."

== Harar ==
On 10 January 1874, Werner Munzinger wrote to the Isma'il Pasha, urging him to seize Harar, the Swiss officer explained to the Egyptian ruler the economic and strategic advantages which would accrue from such a move, and that the revenue from the city's taxes would be sufficient for the upkeep of an Egyptian garrison. In 1875, Muhammad Rauf Pasha led a well armed Egyptian force of 1,200 men from Zeila into the interior of eastern Ethiopia and without encountering any opposition, seized Harar on 11 October 1875. The emir was murdered and his relatives fled the city to seek refuge among the neighboring Oromos.

The Egyptians, despite the Harari capitulation, faced strong resistance from the Oromos of the surrounding area. Rauf Pasha, who was by now appointed governor of Harar, conducted numerous expeditions against the Oromos. Several pyramids of Oromo skulls erected in front of the gates bore testimony to the Egyptian ruler's brutality. The Oromos however, we're not easily crushed, in 1878 a force of no fewer than 35,000 Oromos surrounded the city walls in an attempt to starve the Egyptians into surrender, they were only prevented from doing so by the arrival of Egyptian reinforcements from the coast.

Rauf Pasha took forcible measures to ensure that fallow land was planted with grain or coffee. He levied tax on crops and livestock in order to encourage settlement and further cultivation. He also ordered the abolition of the slave trade in Harar and organized a campaign against the city's "witch doctors" and "medicine men", books of magic were burnt and apothecaries' shops were destroyed, the chewing of khat was also discouraged by the levy of heavy taxes. Rauf Pasha was replaced by Ridhwan Pasha, who was governor from May 1878 to June 1880.

== Sudan ==
After Gordon resigned in 1880, Muhammad Rauf Pasha succeeded him as governor general of Sudan. He made inefficient efforts to calm down the population, whom Gordon had pushed close to rebellion, and to reduce the size of the garrisons in the Sudan, following orders from Riaz Pasha. When Rudolf Carl von Slatin arrived in Khartoum in January 1881 Rauf Pasha appointed him general governor of Darfur in place of Massedaglia. In 1881 he appointed Frank Lupton governor of the Bahr el Ghazal in place of Gessi Pasha.

The first reaction of Rauf Pasha to the 29 June 1881 declaration by Muhammad Ahmad that he was the Mahdi was that Ahmad would be satisfied with a government pension, and he sent him a friendly letter. Ahmad telegraphed an uncompromising reply saying "He who does not believe in me will be purified by the sword." Rauf Pasha sent a small party to arrest the Mahdi, but on 11 August 1881 it was overwhelmed, and the insurrection on the southern Sudan began to grow. Rauf Pasha downplayed the "affray" in his report to Cairo, and sent the governor of Kordofan to Aba Island with 1,000 soldiers to crush the Mahdi. When they arrived they found the Mahdi had fled to the southwest. The soldiers marched after him, but gave up the pursuit when the September rains flooded the roads and riverbeds and returned to El Obeid. The Mahdi established a new base in the Nuba Mountains.

On 9 September 1881 Lt. Col. Ahmad Arabi invested the khedivial palace and became de facto ruler of Egypt. Rauf Pasha found himself adrift without money and orders. The Sudanese conscripts he had dismissed as ordered by Riaz Pasha were going over to the Mahdi, while his Egyptian officers were hoping that with the change of government they could get softer jobs in northern Egypt.

In December 1888 Governor Rashid Ayman at Fashoda led 400 soldiers and a mob of friendly Shilluk tribesmen to attack the Mahdi at Jebel Gadir, 150 miles (240 km) to the southwest. The Mahdi was forewarned and prepared. The two forces clashed in the early morning of 8 December 1881 and the Egyptians were decisively beaten. Rashid Ayman was killed and beheaded. A legend spread rapidly that the Mahdist troops armed with sticks and spears had triumphed over government rifles. Rauf Pasha stated that he had not been aware or involved in the incident. He asked the Khedive Tewfik Pasha for reinforcements, but Tewfik had no loyal troops to spare.

Ahmad Arabi was inclined to cooperate with the Mahdi. In February 1882 the Arabi government appointed Abdel Qadir Pasha Hilmi as successor of Rauf Pasha, and instructed him not to recognize the khedive. Carl Christian Giegler Pasha took office as acting governor general on 4 March 1882. His replacement Fariq Abdel Qadir Pasha Hilmi arrived in Khartoum on 11 May 1882. (Note: A small fleet of French and British vessels arrived at Alexandra on 19 May 1882. After Arabi instigated attacks on Christians, Lieutenant General Garnet Wolseley landed a force of 13,000 at Ismailia, and on 13 September 1883 defeated Arabi at Tel El Kebir, imprisoned him and restored the khedive as a puppet ruler under the British.)

== Sources ==
- Beckett, Ian (2006), Victorians at War, A&C Black, ISBN 978-1-85285-510-9
- Daly, M. W. (2010), Darfur's Sorrow: The Forgotten History of a Humanitarian Disaster, Cambridge University Press, ISBN 978-1-139-78849-6
- Ellens, J. Harold (2013), Winning Revolutions: The Psychosocial Dynamics of Revolts for Freedom, Fairness, and Rights, ABC-CLIO, ISBN 978-1-4408-0373-4
- Green, Dominic (2007), Three Empires on the Nile: The Victorian Jihad, 1869–1899, Simon and Schuster, ISBN 978-0-7432-9895-7
- Macro, E. (1947), "Frank Miller Lupton", Sudan Notes and Records, 28, University of Khartoum: 51, JSTOR 41716507
- Murray, T. Douglas; White, Arthur Silva (1895), Sir Samuel Baker; a memoir, London, New York: Macmillan
- Pankhurst, Richard (1982), History of Ethiopian towns from the mid 19th century to 1935
- Simner, Mark (29 June 2017), The Sirdar and the Khalifa: Kitchener's Reconquest of Sudan 1896–98, Fonthill Media, GGKEY:8P4WFH3LAQW
- Wehib M. Ahmed (October 2015), History of Harar and the Hararis (PDF), Harari People Regional State Culture, Heritage and Tourism Bureau
- Zewde, Bahru (2002), A History of Modern Ethiopia, 1855–1991, Ohio University Press, ISBN 978-0-8214-4572-3
