= Isma'il Ayyub Pasha =

Governor-general of the Sudan (died 1884)

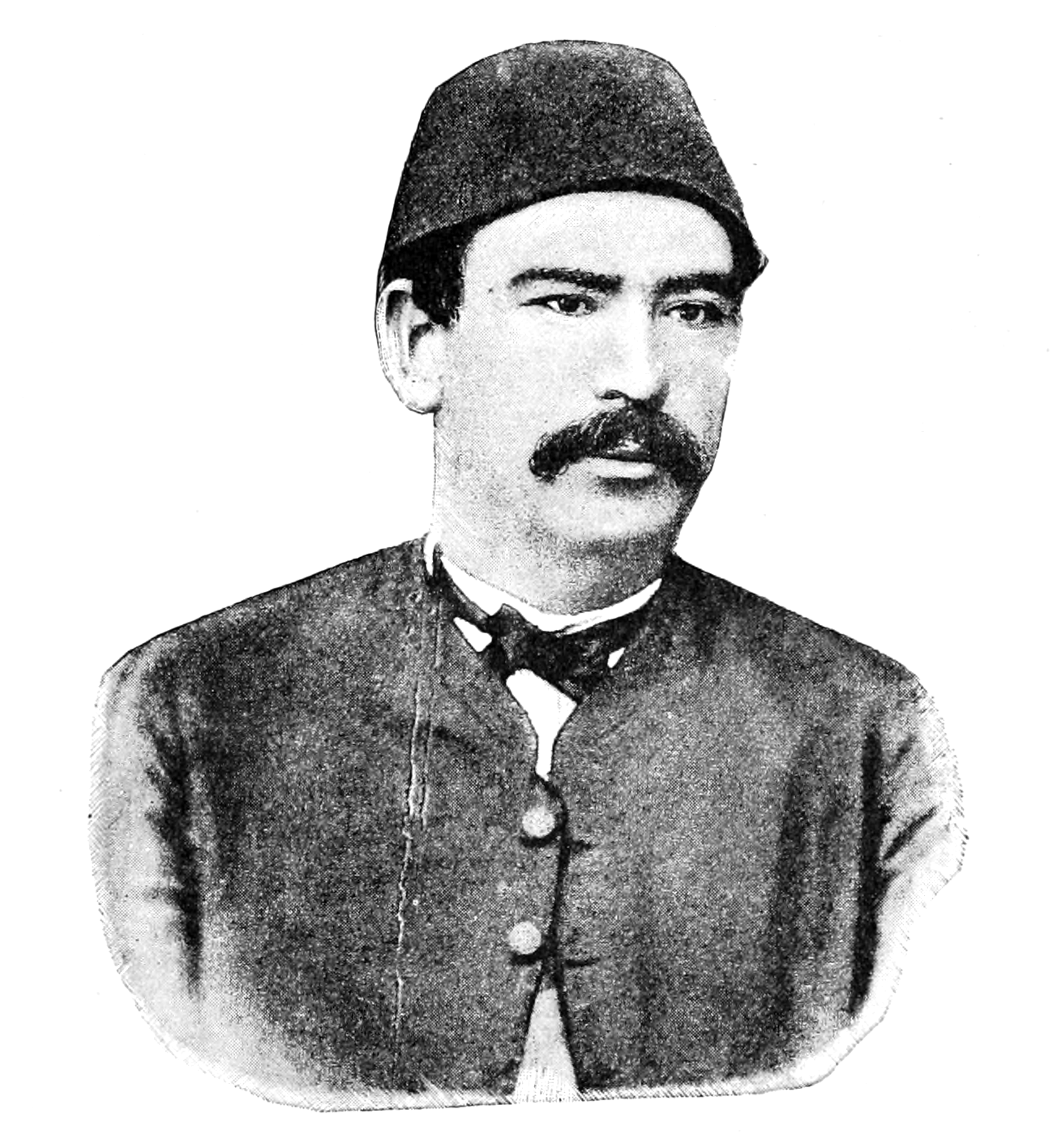
Ismāʿīl Ayyūb Pasha

Ismāʿīl Ayyūb Pasha (died 1884) was an Egyptian administrator who served as the governor-general of the Sudan from 1873 to 1876.

Ayyūb's early life is poorly known. He was possibly Circassian or Kurdish, reputedly a fine musician and according to various reports fluent in French and German. In 1865, with the rank of kaymakam, he led a relief expedition against the Kassala mutiny. In 1870, he was appointed president of the council and secretary to the governor-general in Khartoum. In 1872, he restored communications with Samuel Baker's expedition in Equatoria.

As governor-general, Ayyūb was ordered to prepare to invade and annex the Sultanate of Dār Fūr in February 1874. For this, he concentrated troops in Kordofan. His slowly advancing army captured Umm Shanqa in September while that of al-Zubayr Raḥma Manṣūr advanced from the south. After the fall of Fūr capital, Ayyūb immediately began setting up an administration in the conquered territory. For his victory, he was promoted from the rank of mirliva to that of ferik.

Ayyūb's rule in Khartoum was notable for its town planning and public building. He was succeeded in 1876 by Charles George Gordon. He subsequently served as director of education (1877–1878), minister of public works (1881–1882) and minister of the interior (1883) in Cairo. He joined ʿUrābī's council for the defence of Cairo, but abandoned it before the outbreak of violence, even being appointed to the commission that tried the rebel leaders. In 1883–1884, he was the president of the Khedivial Geographical Society.

== Bibliography ==
- Hill, Richard (1967). A Biographical Dictionary of the Sudan. Frank Cass.
- O'Fahey, R. S. (1997). "The Conquest of Darfur, 1873–1882". Sudan Notes and Records. New Series. 1 (1): 47–67. JSTOR 44947726.
