= Egyptian Geographic Society =

Egyptian research institute

Coordinates: 30.041115°N 31.236016°E

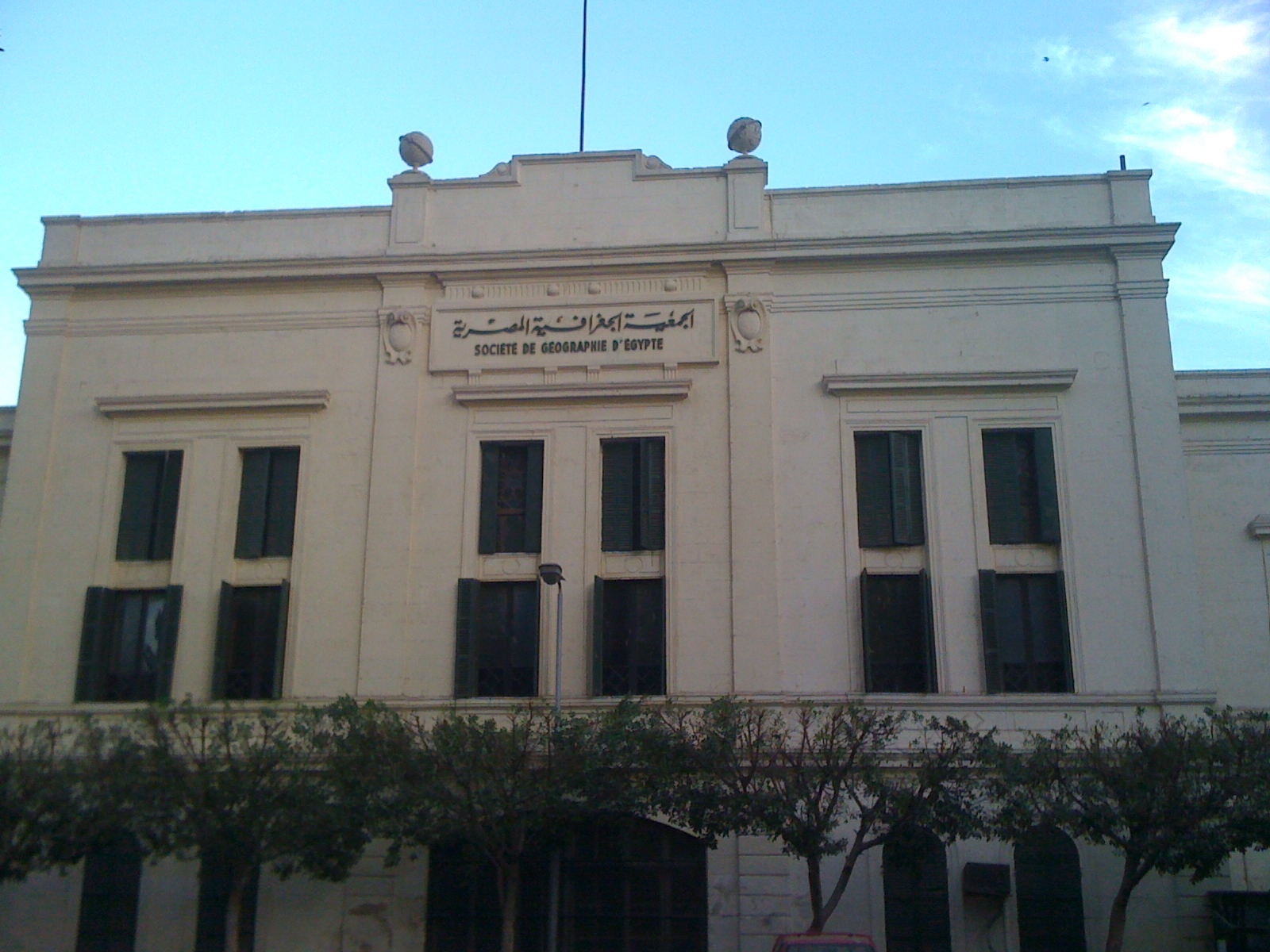
Egyptian Geographic Society

The Egyptian Geographic Society (Arabic: الجمعية الجغرافية المصرية; French: Société de géographie d'Egypte) was established by a decree of Khedive Ismail Pasha on 19 May 1875. Its first president was the German botanist, traveller and ethnologist Georg August Schweinfurth. Founded as the Khedivial Society of Geography, its name was modified several times in order to reflect Egypt's changing political status. It acquired its current name following the Egyptian Revolution of 1952.

== Presidents ==
- Georg August Schweinfurth May 1875 – Dec. 1879
- Charles Pomeroy Stone Dec. 1879 – Jan. 1882
- Ismail Ayoub Pacha Jan. 1883 – Dec. 1883
- Mahmud Ahmad Hamdi al-Falaki Dec. 1883 – Mar. 1889
- Prince Abbas Helmy (Khedive Abbas Helmy II) Mar. 1889 – Dec. 1890
- Dr. O. Abbate Pacha Jan. 1890 – Oct. 1915
- Prince Ahmad Fuad (King Fuad I) Oct. 1915 – Apr. 1918
- Ismail Sidky Apr. 1918 – Dec. 1918
- Georges Foucart Dec. 1918 – Dec. 1926
- William Fraser Hume Dec. 1926 – May 1946
- Sherief Sabry Pacha May 1946 – Mar. 1955
- Prof. Moustafa Amer Mar. 1955 – Feb. 1965
- Prof. Dr. Soliman Ahmad Huzayyin Mar. 1965 – Apr. 1993
- Prof. Dr. Mohammad Safey El-Din Abulezz Apr. 1993 – 2015
