= List of governors of pre-independence Sudan =

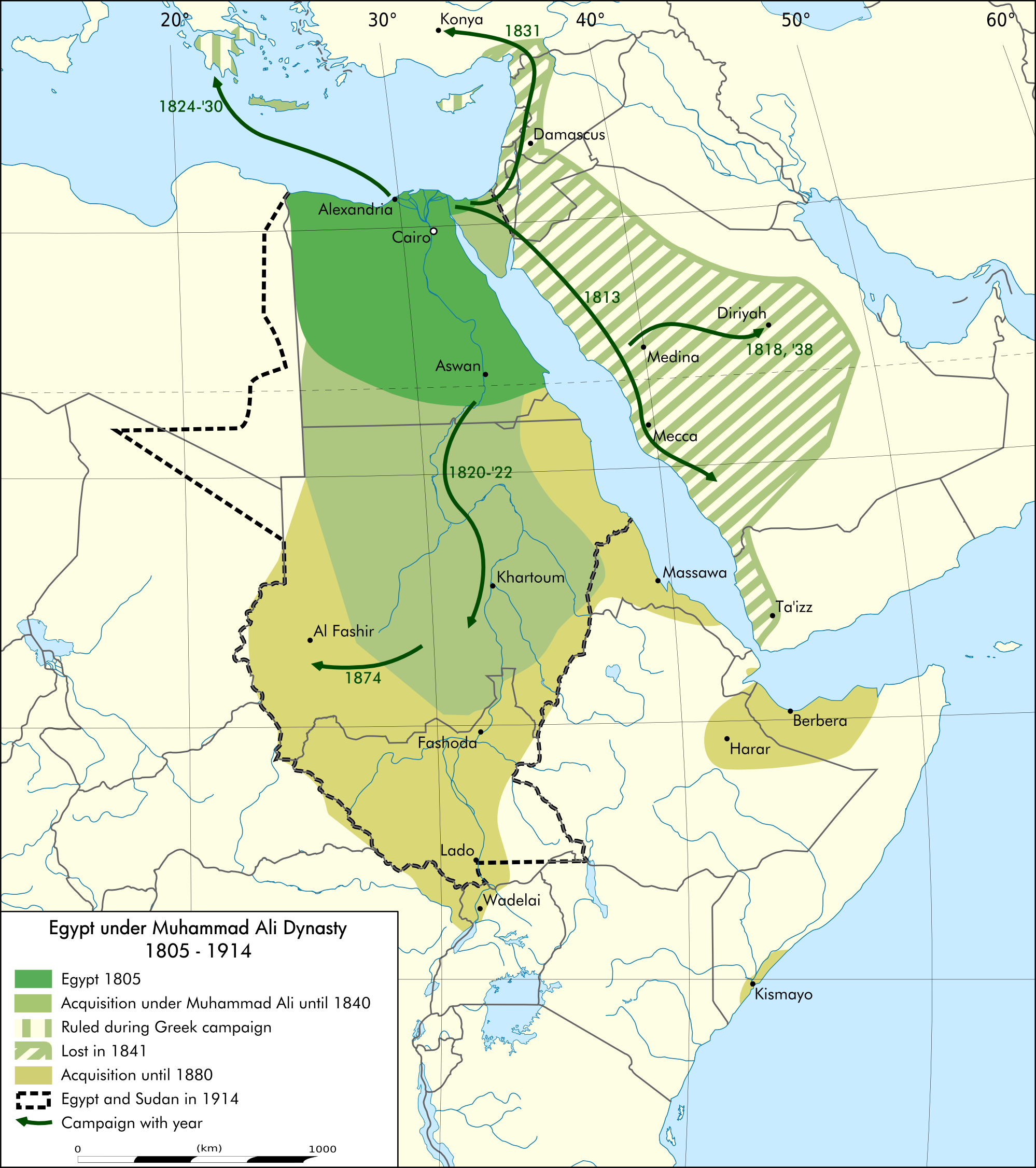
A map of Egypt under the Muhammad Ali dynasty; it shows military campaigns of Muhammad Ali Pasha, including the Turco-Egyptian conquest of Sudan (light green).

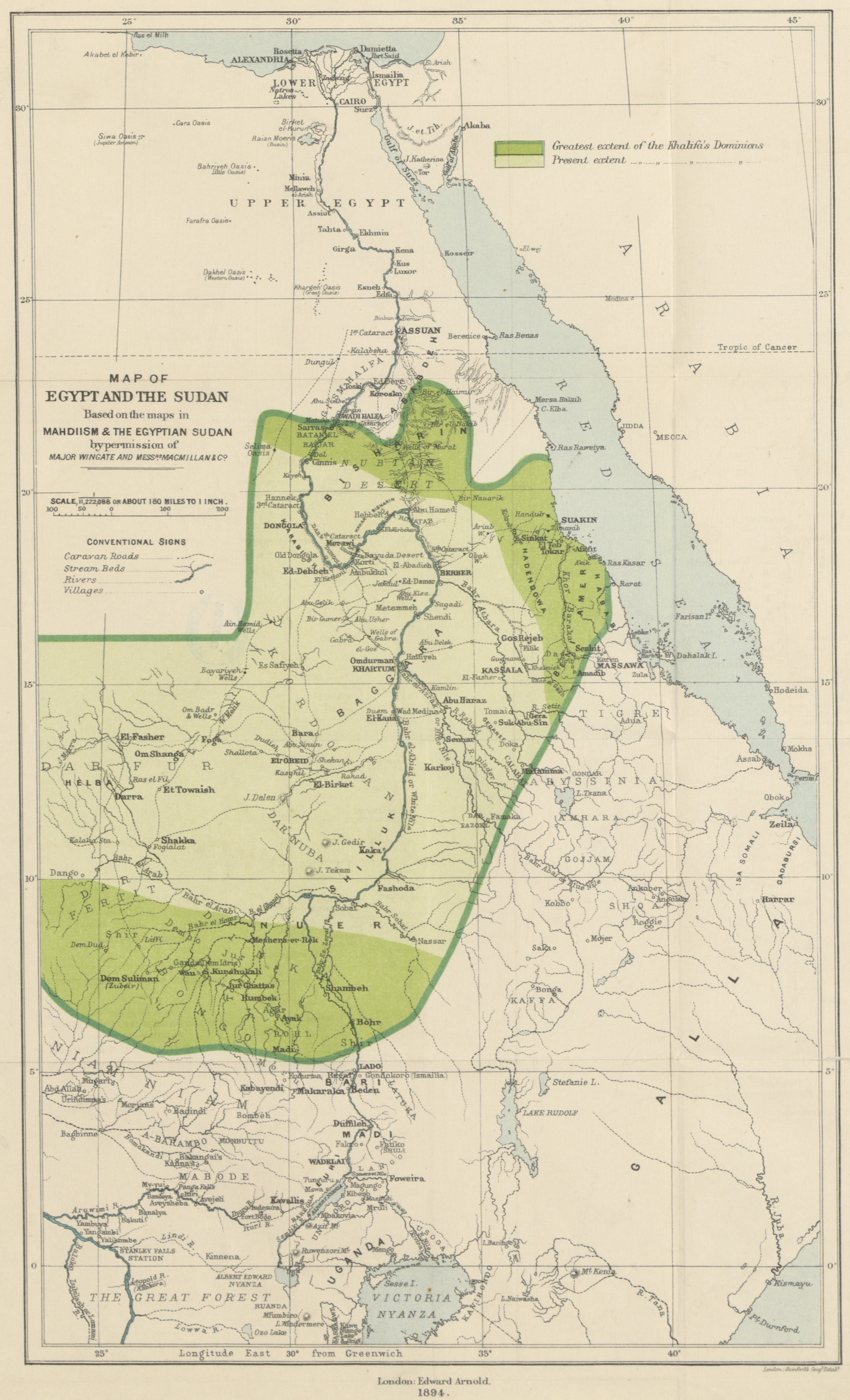
A map of Mahdist State (green) in 1894, on the eve of the Anglo-Egyptian conquest of Sudan.

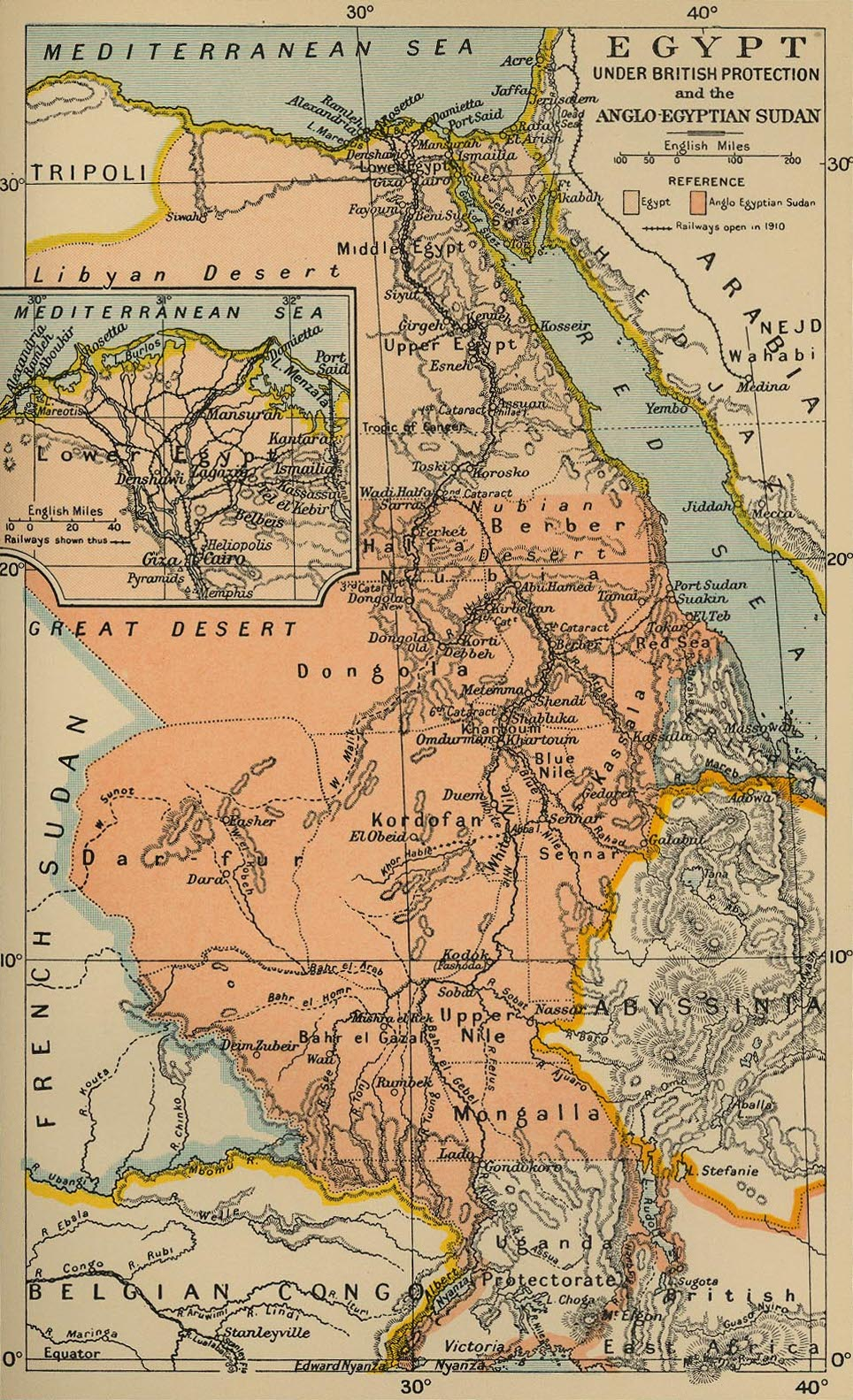
A map of Anglo-Egyptian Sudan (orange) in 1912.

Standard of the Governor-General of the Anglo-Egyptian Sudan

The governors of pre-independence Sudan were the colonial administrators responsible for the territory of Turco-Egyptian Sudan and Anglo-Egyptian Sudan, an area equivalent to modern-day Sudan and South Sudan.

== List ==
(Dates in italics indicate de facto continuation of office)

Tenure	Portrait	Incumbent	Notes
Turco-Egyptian Sudan
November 1820 to 1821		Isma'il Kamil Pasha, Commander	
April 1821 to September 1824		Muhammad Bey Defterdar, Commander	
September 1824 to May 1825		Osman Bey Jarkas, Commander	
May 1825 to March 1826		Mahu Bey Urfali, Commander	
March 1826 to 1835		Ali Khurshid Agha, Governor	
1835 to June 1838		Ali Khurshid Pasha, Hakimdar	Governor-General
June 1838 to 6 October 1843		Ahmad Pasha abu Widan, Hakimdar	Governor-General
1843 to 1845		Ahmad Pasha Manikli (Manliki), Hakimdar	Governor-General
1845 to 1850		Khalid Khusraw Pasha, Hakimdar	Governor-General
1850 to January 1851		'Abd al-Latif Pasha, Hakimdar	Governor-General
January 1851 to May 1852		Rustum Pasha Jarkas, Hakimdar	Governor-General
May 1852 to 1853		Isma'il Haqqi Pasha abu Jabal, Hakimdar	Governor-General
1853 to 1854		Salim Pasha Sa'ib al-Jaza'irli, Hakimdar	Governor-General
July 1854 to November 1854		Ali Pasha Sirri al-Arna'ut, Hakimdar	Governor-General
1854 to 1855		Ali Pasha Jarkas, Governor	
1856 to 1858		Arakil Bey al-Armani, Governor	
1859 to 1861		Hasan Bey Salama Jarkas, Governor	
1861 to 1862		Muhammad Rasikh Bey, Governor	
1862 to 1865		Mūsā Pasha Ḥamdī, Hakimdar	Governor-General
1865 to November 1865		'Umar Bey Fakhri, acting Hakimdar	acting Governor-General
November 1865 to 1866		Ja'afar Pasha Sadiq, Hakimdar	Governor-General
1866 to 5 February 1871		Ja'afar Pasha Mazhar, Hakimdar	Governor-General
5 February 1871 to October 1872		Ahmad Mumtaz Pasha, Hakimdar	Governor-General
October 1872 to 1872		Edhem Pasha al-Arifi at-Atqalawi, acting Hakimdar	acting Governor-General
1873 to 1876		Isma'il Ayyub Pasha, Hakimdar	Governor-General
May 1877 to December 1879		Charles George Gordon ("Gordon Pasha"), Hakimdar	Governor-General, 1st time
December 1879 to February 1882		Muhammad Rauf Pasha, Hakimdar	Governor-General
4 March 1882 to 11 May 1882		Carl Christian Giegler ("Giegler Pasha"), acting Hakimdar	acting Governor-General
May 1882 to March 1883		'Abd al-Qadir Pasha Hilmi, Hakimdar	Governor-General
March 1883 to 5 November 1883		'Ala al-Din Pasha Siddiq, Hakimdar	Governor-General
February 1884 to 18 February 1884		Henry Watts Russell de Coetlogon, acting Hakimdar	acting Governor-General
18 February 1884 to 26 January 1885		Charles George Gordon ("Gordon Pasha"), Hakimdar	Governor-General, 2nd time; Killed at the end of the Siege of Khartoum
26 January 1885 to 2 October 1898	Territory of Turkish Sudan under complete control of Mahdiyah (Mahdist State)		
Mahdist State
29 June 1881 to 22 June 1885		Muhammad Ahmad, Mahdi	Self-proclaimed Mahdi, Islamic Messiah
22 June 1885 to 2 September 1898		Abdallahi ibn Muhammad, Khalifa	Self-proclaimed Caliph, successor to Muhammad Ahmad; Defeated in the Battle of Omdurman, and later killed in the Battle of Umm Diwaykarat
British Military Administration
2 September 1898 to 19 January 1899		The 1st Baron Kitchener of Khartoum, Military Governor	Simultaneously served as Sirdar. Was known as Sir Herbert Kitchener up until 31 October 1898
Anglo-Egyptian Sudan (condominium)
19 January 1899 to 22 December 1899		The 1st Baron Kitchener of Khartoum, Governor-General	Simultaneously served as Sirdar. Was later created The 1st Earl Kitchener, in July 1914
22 December 1899 to 31 December 1916		Sir Reginald Wingate, Governor-General	Simultaneously served as Sirdar
1 January 1917 to 20 November 1924		Sir Lee Oliver Fitzmaurice Stack, Governor-General	Simultaneously served as Sirdar; assassinated in Cairo
21 November 1924 to 5 January 1925		Wasey Sterry, acting Governor-General	
5 January 1925 to 6 July 1926		Sir Geoffrey Francis Archer, Governor-General	The first civilian Governor-General
31 October 1926 to 10 January 1934		Sir John Loader Maffey, Governor-General	
10 January 1934 to 19 October 1940		Sir George Stewart Symes, Governor-General	
19 October 1940 to 8 April 1947		Sir Hubert Jervoise Huddleston, Governor-General	
8 April 1947 to 29 March 1954		Sir Robert George Howe, Governor-General	
29 March 1954 to 12 December 1955		Sir Alexander Knox Helm, Governor-General	
12 December 1955 to 1 January 1956		Muhammad Ahmad Abu Rannat, acting Governor-General	Chief Justice of Sudan
1 January 1956	Independence as the Republic of Sudan		

For continuation after independence, see: List of heads of state of Sudan

== See also ==
- Sudan
  - Politics of Sudan
  - History of Sudan
  - List of heads of state of Sudan
  - Vice President of Sudan
  - List of heads of government of Sudan
  - List of current state governors in Sudan
- South Sudan
  - Politics of South Sudan
  - History of South Sudan
  - List of heads of state of South Sudan
  - Vice President of South Sudan
  - List of current state governors in South Sudan
