= Karkoj =

Karkoj كركوج
- Town
- Location within Sudan
- Coordinates: 12°55′48″N 34°1′12″E
- Country: Sudan
- State: Sennar

Karkoj (Arabic: كركوج) is a town located in Sennar, Sudan.
