= Meyrifab =

Semi-nomad tribe of Arabs

The Meyrfab is a Sudanese Arab tribe, part of the larger Ja'alin group. They reside in the River Nile State in Sudan, with their center in Berber.
