= Al-Zubayr Rahma Mansur =

Slave trader and Sudanese governor

- الزبير رحمة منصور
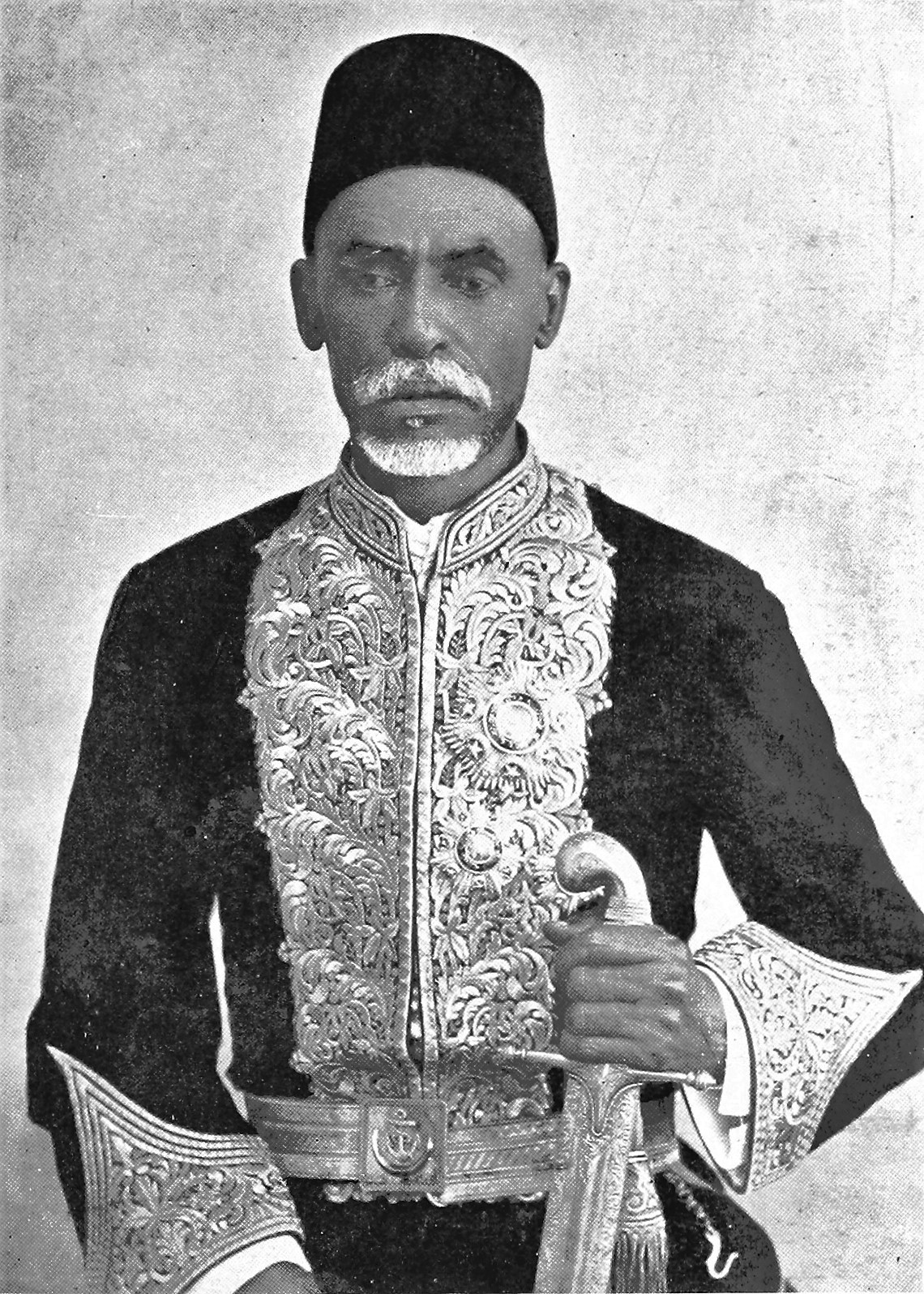

Governor of Bahr al-Ghazal
- In office 1873–1877
- Monarch: Isma'il Pasha
- Succeeded by: Charles Gordon (Governor-General of Sudan)

Personal details
- Born: c. 1830 Turkish Sudan, Egypt Eyalet, Ottoman Empire
- Died: January 1913 Geili, Anglo-Egyptian Sudan
- Children: Suleiman (executed)

Military service
- Allegiance: Khedivate of Egypt
- Rank: Bey and Pasha
- Battles/wars: Conquest of Darfur; Mahdist War

Al-Zubayr Rahma Mansur Pasha (Arabic: الزبير رحمة منصور; c. 1830 – January 1913), also known as Sebehr Rahma or Rahama Zobeir, was a Sudanese slave trader and warlord in the late 19th century. He was later acknowledged by Isma'il Pasha, of the Khedivate of Egypt in granting him the title of Governor over Bahr el Ghazal (today western South Sudan).

His reputation as an archenemy of General Charles Gordon led to him gaining a near-mythic status in the United Kingdom, where he was referred to as "the richest and worst", a "Slaver King" "who [had] chained lions as part of his escort".

== Background ==
Born in 1830 as Al-Zubayr Rahma Mansur, he came from the Gemaab section of the Ja'alin, an Arab tribe in northern Sudan.

He began his large-scale business in 1856, when he left Khartoum with a small army, to set up a network of trading forts known as zaribas, focusing his efforts on slave trading and ivory sales. At its height, his trading empire, backed by a personal army, controlled much of the Bahr el Ghazal as well as what are today parts of Chad and the Central African Republic.

In 1871, at the height of his power, Rahma was visited at his headquarters in Deim Zubeir by Georg Schweinfurth, who described the slave trader's court as "little less than princely". Isma'il Pasha of Egypt desired control over the region, but Rahma defeated a mercenary army sent against him. Instead in 1873 Isma'il added the region to his empire by acknowledging Rahma's power and granting him the title of Governor over Bahr el Ghazal.

Eventually Rahma controlled 30 zaribas, and earned the titles of bey and Pasha, after allying himself, and his lieutenant Rabih az-Zubayr, with the khedive Ismail Pasha briefly during the invasion of Darfur, where he led the southern forces. He was referred to as "the Black Pasha", and ultimately wished to become Governor General.

== Opposition to Gordon ==
In 1877, General Gordon arrived as the newly appointed Governor of the Sudan, and sought to suppress the slave trade. Rahma brought his grievances to Cairo, asking for the Governorship of the newly conquered Darfur, but was rejected. Egyptian authorities also prohibited his return to Sudan, but allowed him to travel to Constantinople at the outbreak of the Russo-Turkish War.

That year, Gordon wrote back home "I have to contend with many vested interests, with fanaticism, with the abolition...with a large semi-independent province lately under Sebehr, the Black Pasha, at Bahr Gazelle".

Rahma's 22-year-old son Suleiman also fought against General Gordon from a stronghold, nicknamed The Cave of Adullam, located outside Shaka. Gordon briefly considered offering Suleiman the position of Governor of Dara in an attempt to occupy him with peaceful plans. Instead, he chose to have El Nour, one of Suleiman's chiefs, report on activity within the group and in turn be offered the Governorship himself. Through this, he learned that Suleiman was still receiving letters from Rahma, whose correspondence always included the cryptic phrase "Take care of Abdoul Razoul".

== Detained in Egypt, his son takes command ==
Prior to his 1878 departure to Cairo, where he intended to bribe other pashas with approximately £100,000 to recognize his sovereignty, Rahma had gathered his chiefs under a tree between Shaka and Obeid where they agreed that if the plan failed, they would go "to arms! to the road!". He was detained by Egyptian forces for his attempts at bribery and refused permission to return to the Sudan. He messaged General Gordon, offering £25,000 annually to the Khedive, and to restore order within the Sudan, if only he would be allowed to return. Gordon declined the offer, and Rahma sent a message to his chiefs that they should "obey the orders given under the tree", which resulted in Gordon being met by near-anarchy upon his return to Khartoum.

Intent on dealing with Suleiman while his father was still imprisoned, General Gordon arranged several times to meet peacefully with the young man now leading his father's forces. Referring to him as a "cub", Gordon took an almost fatherly approach towards him, and explained at his camp that he was aware of what revolts the slavers had been provoking, and he was now offering an ultimatum – either Suleiman announce his surrender of the Cave of Adullam or he would attack with an overwhelming force. Feeling sick, and begging time to think on the matter, Suleiman returned to the cave where his forces rumored that Gordon had served the group poisoned coffee.

Shortly afterward, Suleiman sent Gordon confirmation of the surrender and began making his way northwards towards other stations. While in the city of Shaka, he sent a letter referring to himself as Gordon's "son" and asking for a position in the government. Gordon responded that he would rather die, than grant any title to the rebel leader unless he had traveled to Cairo and sworn allegiance to the Khedive.

Gordon wrote a few days later, "Suleiman no longer hopes to conquer...he may try to go up to other stations inland, but I do not expect it will last long; a retreating commander is rarely in a good temper, and he will soon disgust his people."

Angered, Suleiman rallied 6,000 of his men in large raids, which were quickly dispelled at Gordon's command by the troops of Yussuf Pasha and Romolo Gessi. Gessi, together with Taha Mahomet, had earlier been credited with sacking Dem Sebehr, a reputed stronghold of the slaving clan.

In early September, while traveling through Shaka, Gordon was surprised to be extended an invitation to spend two days in Suleiman's house. He accepted, but spent the following days again rejecting Suleiman's pleas for a title of government, but consoled the young chief by giving him a rifle and teaching him its proper use. Eventually, Suleiman was captured and executed under the command of Romolo Gessi (on Gordon's orders).

== Later role ==
On 18 February 1884, Gordon offered the imprisoned Rahma leadership of the entire Sudan, in addition to his freedom if he would help the British keep the forces of Muhammad Ahmad at bay. The following month, Gordon astonished Europe by recommending Rahma to be named his successor as Governor of Sudan.

Sir Reginald Wingate, who knew him personally, declared to British society that Rahma was a "far-seeing, thoughtful man of iron will, a born ruler of men" Eventually, Queen Victoria, Sir Evelyn Baring, William Ewart Gladstone and Nubar Pasha in Cairo, all agreed to allow Rahma the title, but the order was rescinded by the British government, upset with Rahma's slave-raiding practises.

Nevertheless, he was put in charge of all the Black African forces, as well as sharing command of Arab forces with Hussein Pasha.

In March 1885, he was removed from command and imprisoned at Gibraltar, when British forces suspected that he might have negotiated fealty to Ahmad, the "false prophet", based on alleged correspondence between them.

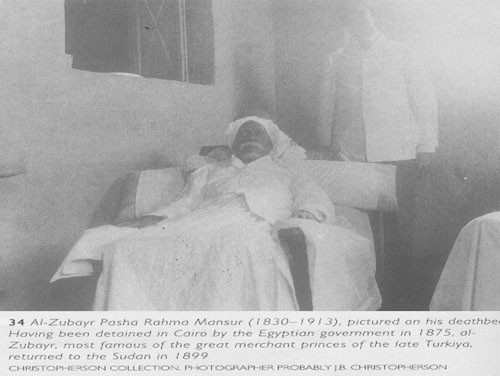
Zubayr Rahma on his deathbed in 1913

In August 1887 he was allowed to return to Cairo, and after the 1899 reconquest of the Sudan was permitted to settle in his native country. He established himself on his estates at Geili, some 30 miles north of Khartoum.

In retirement Zubayr Rahma wrote his memoirs, which were translated into English as Black Ivory: Or, the Story of El Zubeir Pasha, Slaver and Sultan, as Told By Himself.

He died peacefully in January 1913 in his home village Geili.

A street in Downtown Khartoum is still named after Zubayr, and the town of Uyujuku in South Sudan is still commonly known as Deim Zubeir.

== In popular culture ==
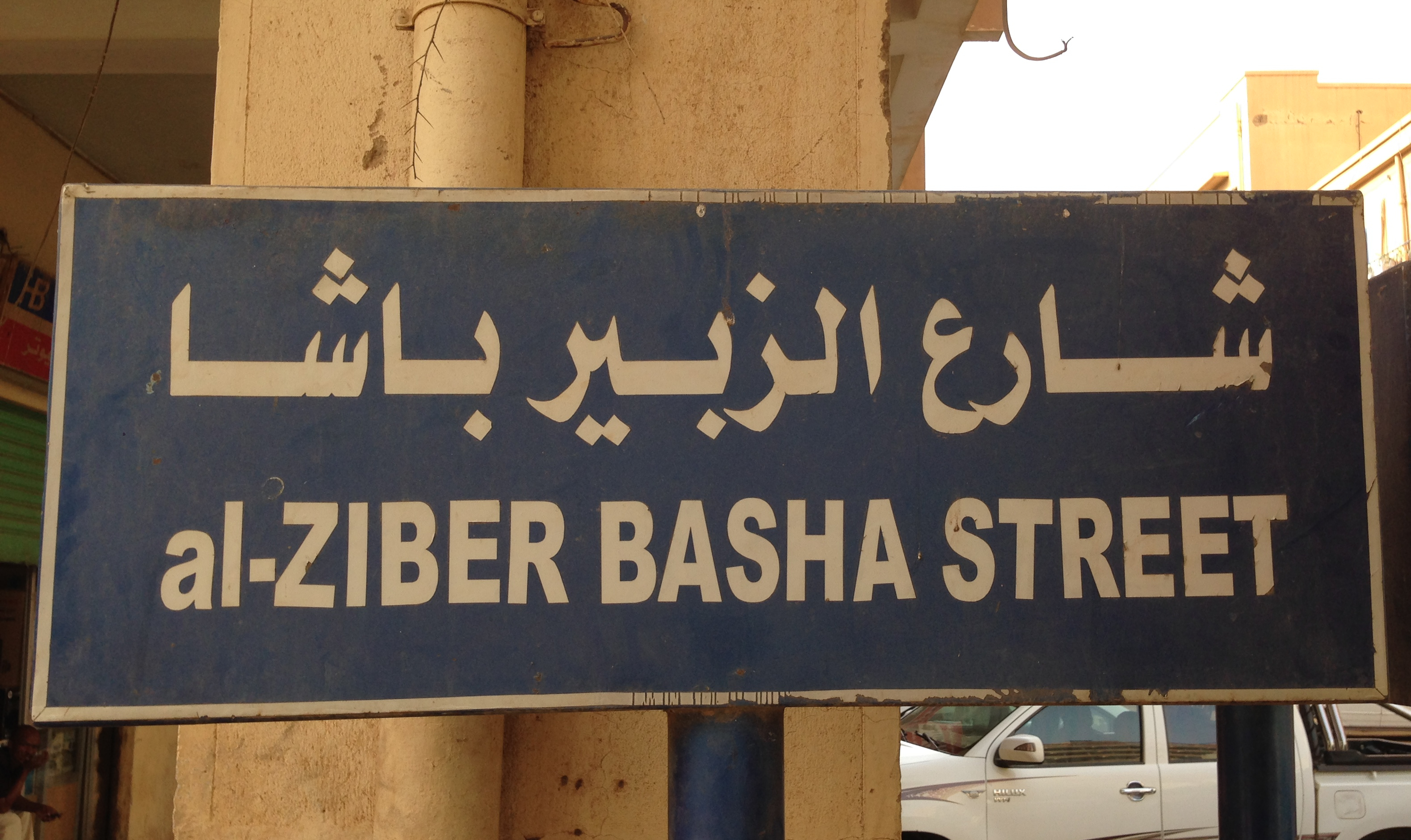
Ziber Basha Street in Khartoum, 2018

The 1966 film Khartoum stars Zia Mohyeddin as Zubayr, where he plays opposite Charlton Heston's General Gordon. Toward the beginning of the film, Zubayr is portrayed as a harbinger of doom. He refuses to cooperate with the General in his reconquest of the Sudan, and prophesies his death at the hands of the Mahdi forces.
