= Müdri =

- Municipality
- Location within Azerbaijan
- Coordinates: 40°52′26″N 48°19′54″E
- Country: Azerbaijan
- Rayon: Ismailli

Population
  - Total: 220
- Time zone: UTC+4 (AZT)
  - Summer (DST): UTC+5 (AZT)

Müdri (also, Myudri and Myudry) is a village and municipality in the Ismailli Rayon of Azerbaijan. It has a population of 220. The municipality consists of the villages of Müdri and Nanıc.
