= Anglo-Egyptian Sudan =

1899–1956 Period of Colonial rule in Sudan

Coordinates: 15°37′59″N 32°31′59″E

Anglo-Egyptian Sudan السودان اﻹنجليزي المصري (Arabic) as-Sūdān al-Inglīzī al-Maṣrī
- 1899–1956
- Flags of the United Kingdom and the Kingdom of Egypt respectively. Emblem

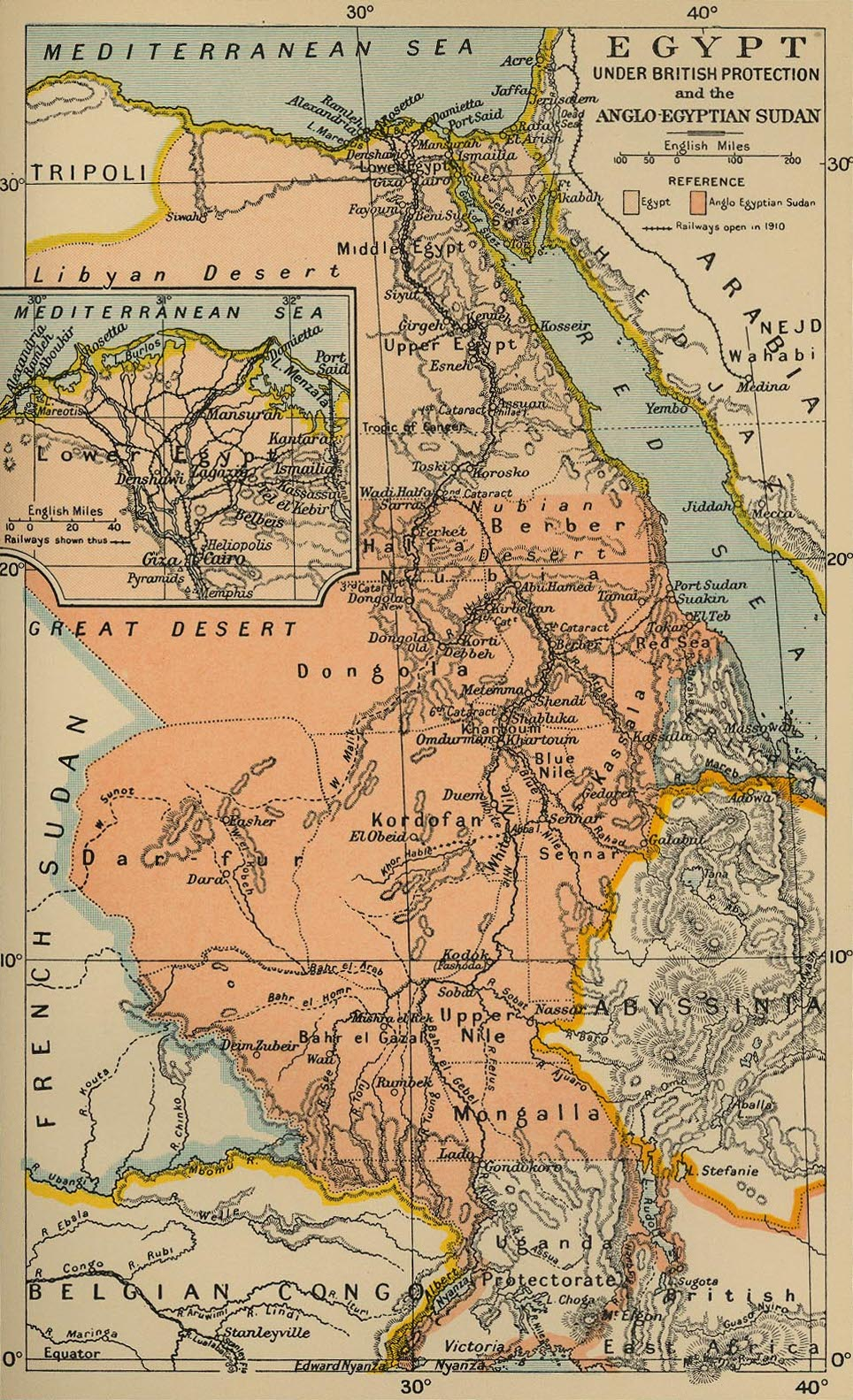
- Status: Condominium between the United Kingdom and Egypt
- Capital: Khartoum
- Common languages: English and Literary Arabic (official) Minority Languages: Nubian, Beja, Nuer, Dinka, Fur and Shilluk
- Religion: Predominantly: Sunni Islam; Minority: Christianity, Traditional African religions (In The South)
- Type: Dependent territory: Self-governing colony (from 1952)
- Governor-General
  - 1899: Lord Kitchener
  - 1899–1916: Reginald Wingate
  - 1917–1924: Sir Lee Stack
  - 1925–1926: Geoffrey Archer
  - 1926–1934: John Maffey
  - 1934–1940: Stewart Symes
  - 1940–1947: Hubert Huddleston
  - 1947–1954: Robert George Howe
- Chief Minister
  - 1952–1954: Abd al-Rahman al-Mahdi
  - 1954–1956: Ismail al-Azhari
- Legislature: Bicameral parliament
  - Upper house: Senate
  - Lower house: House of Representatives
- Historical era: British Imperial
  - Established: 19 January 1899
  - 1924 Revolution: June 1924
  - Self-Rule: 22 October 1952
  - Independence: 1 January 1956

Area
- 1951: 2,505,800 km^{2} (967,500 sq mi)

Population
  - 1951: 8,079,800
- Currency: Egyptian pound
Preceded by
Mahdist Sudan
Sultanate of Darfur
Shilluk Kingdom
Lado Enclave
Succeeded by
Protectorate of Uganda
Italian Libya
Republic of the Sudan
Kenya Colony
- Today part of: Sudan; Egypt; Libya; South Sudan; Uganda; Kenya

Anglo-Egyptian Sudan (Arabic: السودان الإنجليزي المصري, romanised: as-Sūdān al-Inglīzī al-Maṣrī) was a condominium of Britain and Egypt from 1899 to 1956, covering present-day Sudan and South Sudan. Sudan was governed de facto by British officials under a governor-general resident in Khartoum.

The condominium followed the Anglo-Egyptian conquest of Sudan, which overthrew the Mahdist State in 1898. Under the agreement of January 1899, the Egyptian khedive appointed the governor-general on British recommendation and could dismiss him only with British consent. During World War I, the administration annexed Darfur after the defeat of Ali Dinar in 1916. Following the assassination of Governor-General Lee Stack in Cairo in 1924, Britain ordered Egyptian troops and officials to leave Sudan, curtailing their influence.

The government expanded railways and communications, developed Port Sudan, and introduced irrigated cotton cultivation through the Gezira Scheme. Investment was concentrated in Khartoum and the Blue Nile province, while cotton became the main export. British district commissioners of the Sudan Political Service increasingly governed through local chiefs under native administration. The three southern provinces were administered separately. In 1946, the government reversed its southern policy and began integrating the northern and southern administrations.

Sudanese nationalists opposed British rule but disagreed over independence or union with Egypt. After the Egyptian revolution of 1952, Egypt accepted Sudanese self-determination. On 12 February 1953, Britain and Egypt signed an agreement providing for self-government followed by a decision on Sudan's future. A Sudanese government led by Ismail al-Azhari took office in January 1954. Southern resistance to northern administrative and military control contributed to the Torit mutiny in August 1955. Parliament unanimously declared independence on 19 December 1955, and Sudan became an independent republic on 1 January 1956.

== Background ==
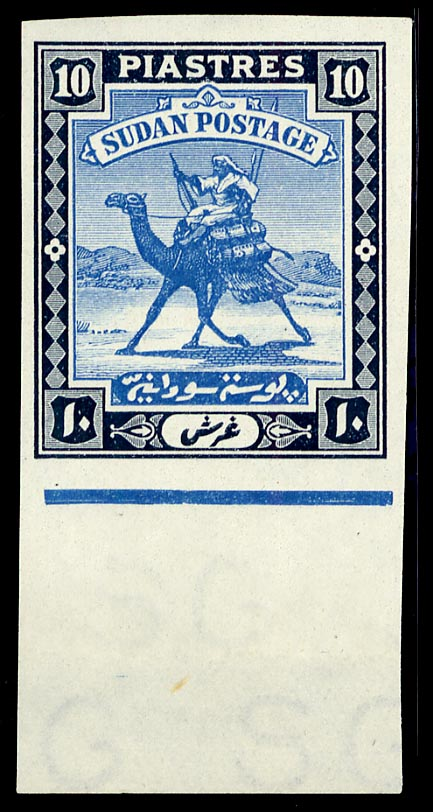
The Camel Postman postage stamp of Anglo-Egyptian Sudan, 10 piastres (1927).

=== Turco-Egyptian Sudan ===
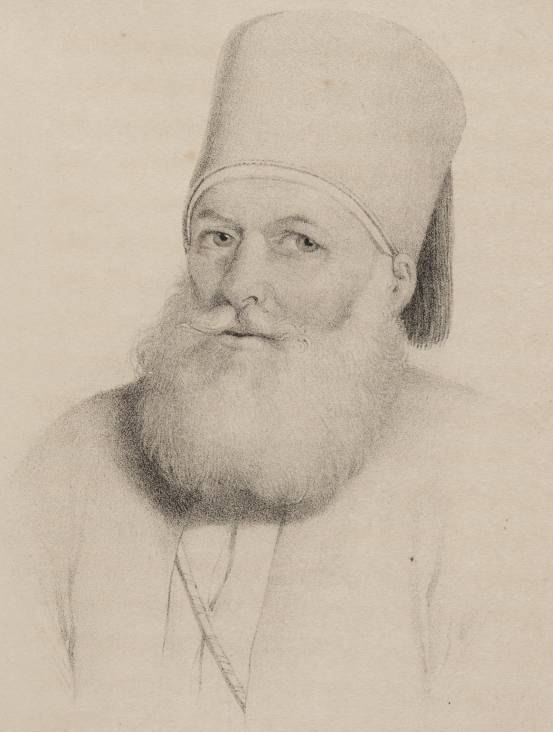
Muhammad Ali Pasha, who ordered the conquest of Sudan in 1820.

After the Massacre of the Citadel in 1811, which decimated Egypt's Mamluk leadership, the Egyptian wāli Muhammad Ali Pasha sought southward expansion. In 1820, an Egyptian army under his son Ismail Kamil Pasha marched from Aswan through Dongola, where remaining Mamluks surrendered, and encountered Shayqiya resistance. Ismail defeated them at Kurti in November and again at Jabal al-Dayqa in December 1820, before advancing through Berber and Shendi and conquering the Funj Sultanate in 1821. Meanwhile, a separate expedition under Muhammad Bey Khusraw captured Kordofan following the battle at Bara.

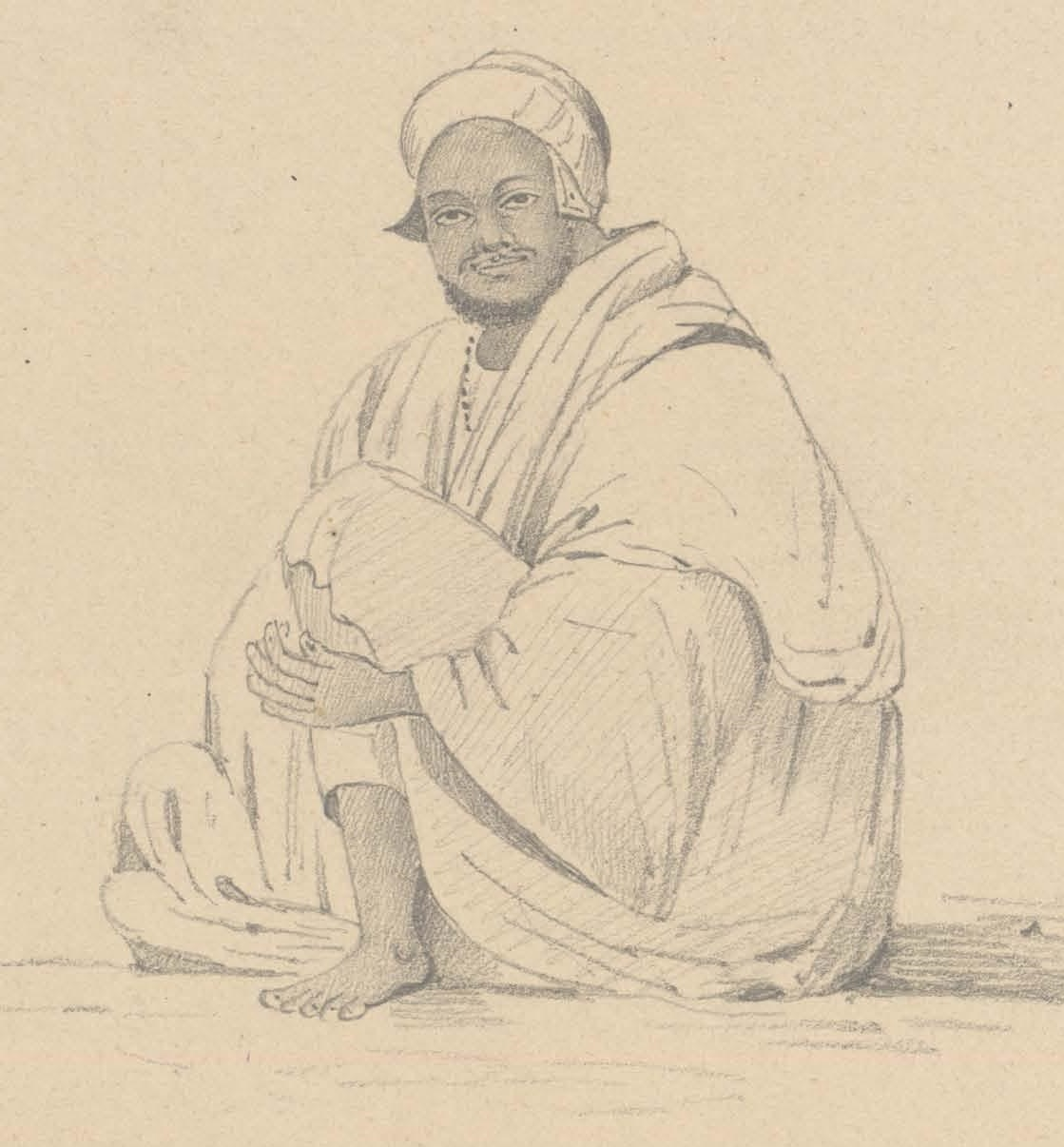
Mek Nimr, the Ja'ali ruler of Shendi who led the revolt against Ismail Kamil Pasha.

The conquest was followed by a revolt under the Ja'ali ruler Mek Nimr in which Ismail was killed at Shendi after an Egyptian tribute dispute, which was subsequently suppressed, consolidating Egyptian rule over much of northern and central Sudan by 1824. Ismail's death sparked widespread Nile uprisings, after which Mahammad Khusraw launched brutal reprisals through Ja'alin territory. His forces advanced from the Sixth Cataract toward al-Matamma, where they massacred inhabitants, before destroying Ad-Damir and sacking Shendi, devastating surrounding settlements. His forces massacred inhabitants and ravaged settlements, causing widespread depopulation.

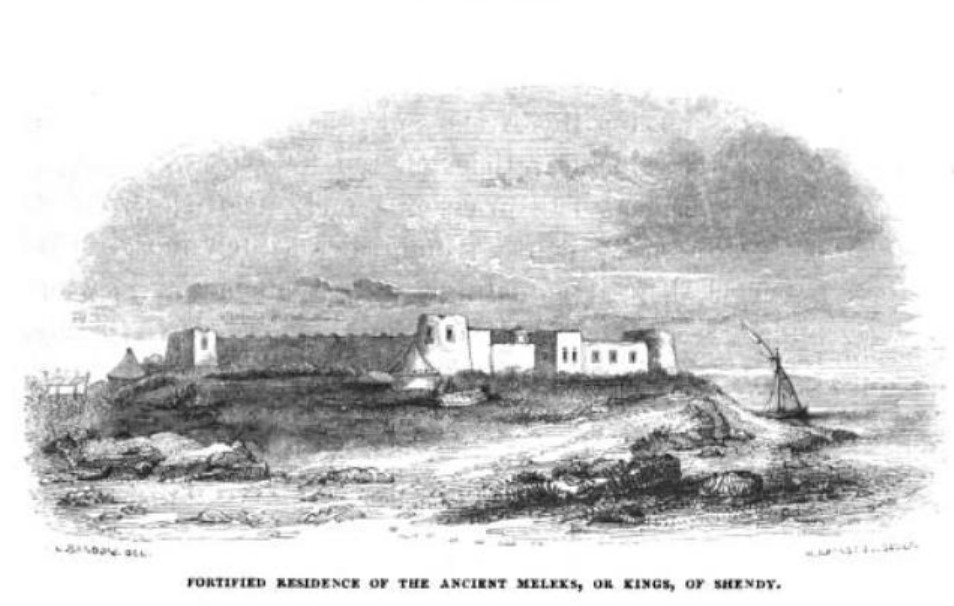
The residence of the makk of Shendi, depicted in 1835.

Northern Sudan had longstanding politico-economic ties with Egypt, and parts had previously been under Egyptian influence. The invasion was motivated by Muhammad Ali's ambitions to acquire territory, gold, and enslaved recruits, expand Egyptian control along the Nile, and build a larger, better-disciplined army to strengthen his autonomy from the Ottoman Empire and establish a regional empire. Muhammad Ali was pursuing aggressive expansionism to possibly supplant the Ottoman Empire (to which he technically owed fealty), and saw Sudan as a valuable Egyptian acquisition.

Muhammad Ali also sought to maintain large, growing Sudanese slave imports into Egypt for his new Egyptian standing army, which would allow him to replace the mutinous Albanian and Turkish troops on whom he had relied, and to support his conquests. But the plan was undermined by high slave mortality, particularly among those taken from the Nuba Mountains and southern Sudan, during protracted transport to Egypt and from disease and harsh training-camp conditions. Those considered unfit for service were instead assigned to agricultural and industrial work.

A map of Khartoum around 1840.

After Sennar's conquest, Egyptian forces established their initial administrative headquarters at Wad Madani on the Blue Nile. Yet the Egyptian administration faced difficulties governing from Wad Madani, which prompted relocation toward the strategic Blue Nile–White Nile confluence, where they established a military camp at Khartoum in 1821, which became Sudan's administrative capital. After the Egyptian conquest of the Sennar confederation and the establishment of Turkiyya Sudan, the administration subdivided the territory into provinces and districts, often following older boundaries and employing local chiefs to oversee administration and taxation. This system was mainly intended to finance the occupation and enrich Egypt by taxing livestock, slaves, and agricultural production. Khartoum developed into Egyptian Sudan's administrative centre, becoming the governor-general's seat in 1835.

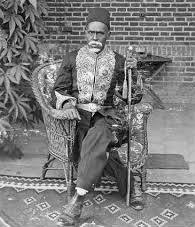
Zubayr Rahma, a Sudanese military leader and governor in Egyptian Sudan.

Just as Isma'il Pasha had promoted Egyptian cotton cultivation, the Egyptian administration sought to expand Sudanese cotton production amid mounting government debts. From the late 1860s, Ahmad Mumtaz Pasha developed cotton plantations in the flood-irrigated Gash and Baraka deltas in eastern Sudan, hoping to increase agricultural exports and government revenue.

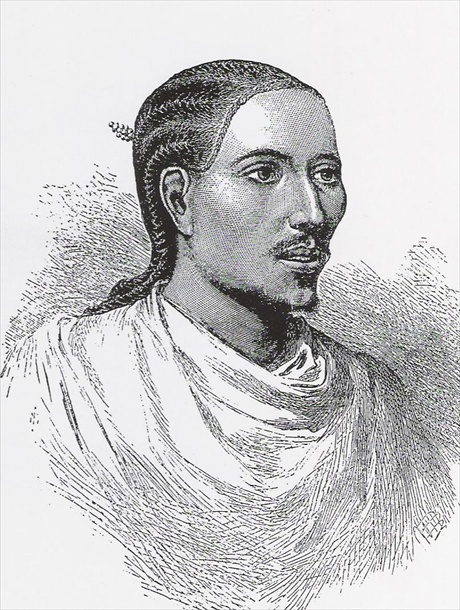
Emperor Yohannes IV, whose forces defeated Egyptian armies in 1875–1876.

Under Muhammad Ali and his successors, Sudan's conquered territories were governed by Egypt during the Turkiyya. This expansionism was intensified under Muhammad Ali's grandson, Isma'il Pasha, who ruled Egypt in 1863–1879. Under him, Egyptian control expanded into Darfur and parts of present-day South Sudan, including Equatoria's establishment along the upper White Nile. Isma'il appointed Samuel Baker and later Charles George Gordon to lead regional expeditions, seeking to extend Egyptian authority towards the African Great Lakes and to suppress the slave trade to honour their agreements with Western powers. Egyptian territorial claims, however, exceeded effective administrative control.

Egyptian expansion of Sudan was checked by the Egyptian–Ethiopian War of 1875–1876, during which Emperor Yohannes IV's forces triumphed at the Battle of Gundet in November 1875 and the Battle of Gura in March 1876. These defeats ended Isma'il Pasha's highland expansion attempts and severely weakened Egypt's regional military position.

=== British involvement ===
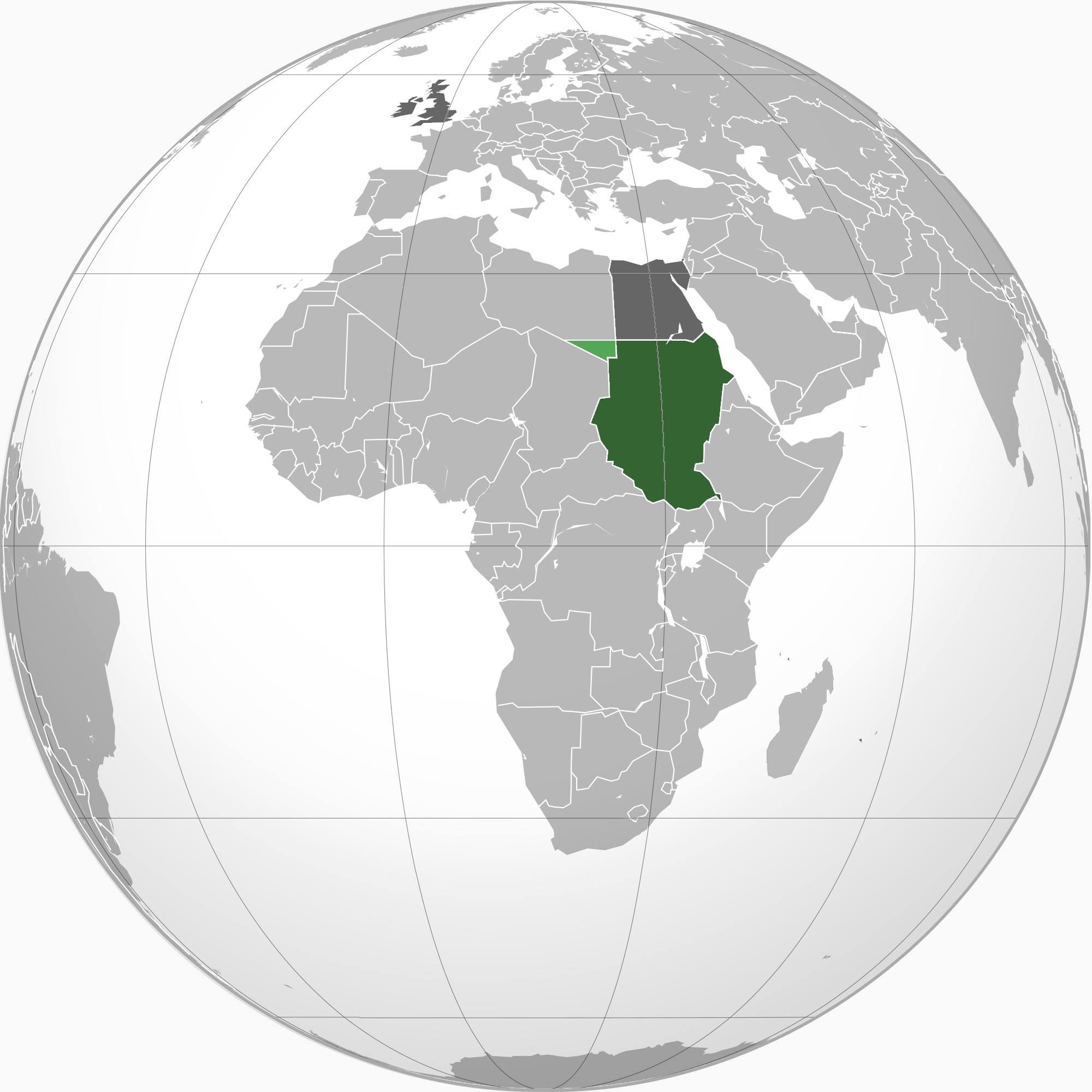
Green: Anglo-Egyptian Sudan Light green: Sarra Triangle ceded to Italian Libya in 1934 Dark grey: Egypt and the United Kingdom

With the opening of the Suez Canal in 1869, Egypt and Sudan's economic and strategic importance increased enormously, attracting the imperial attentions of the Great Powers, particularly the United Kingdom. Being heavily indebted to European creditors, Egypt was forced to sell its 44 per cent shareholding in the Suez Canal Company in 1875 after failing to meet its mounting financial obligations, allowing the British government under Benjamin Disraeli to purchase the shares and thus expand British financial interests in the canal and the region. A year after Egypt sold its shares in the Suez Canal Company, mounting debts prompted further British and French intervention, leading to the establishment of the Caisse de la Dette Publique in 1876 and the introduction of Dual Control of Egypt which placed its finances under European supervision well before the Berlin Conference.

Ten years later in 1879, the immense foreign debt of Ismail Pasha's government served as the pretext for the Great Powers to force his abdication and replacement by his son Tewfik Pasha. The manner of Tewfik's ascension at the hands of foreign powers greatly angered Egyptian and Sudanese nationalists who resented the ever-increasing influence of European governments and merchants in the affairs of the country. The situation was compounded by Tewfik's perceived corruption and mismanagement, ultimately culminating in the Orabi Revolt led by the nationalist head of the army, Ahmed Orabi. The movement demanded greater Egyptian representation in the army and government, constitutional reforms, and an end to foreign financial interference. With the survival of his throne in jeopardy, Tewfik appealed for British assistance. In 1882, at Tewfik's invitation, the British bombarded Alexandria, Egypt and Sudan's primary seaport, and subsequently invaded the country. British forces overthrew the Orabi government in Cairo, and proceeded to occupy the rest of Egypt and Sudan in 1882. Though officially the authority of Tewfik had been restored, in reality the British largely took control of Egyptian and Sudanese affairs. In 1883, Evelyn Baring became British agent and consul-general in Egypt, exercising considerable influence over the Egyptian government while the Khedive remained the nominal ruler.

The British occupation of the Khedivate of Egypt became a subject of European diplomacy, particularly as colonial competition with France and the German Empire intensified in Africa. In 1884, German Chancellor Otto von Bismarck used the Egyptian Lever to seek British support for German colonial expansion in exchange for diplomatic backing over Egypt. Meanwhile, the Mahdist War in Sudan further complicated Britain's position following the defeat of an Egyptian expedition in November 1883 and the dispatch of Charles George Gordon to Sudan in 1884. The failure of Anglo-French negotiations over Egypt in June 1884 further increased diplomatic tensions, while the competing British and French ambitions in Sudan later peaked and ended in the Fashoda Incident of 1898.

=== Mahdist revolt ===
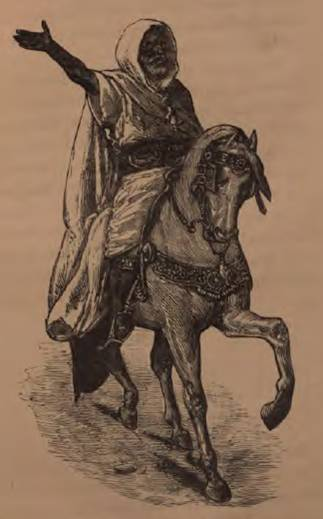
An 1884 artistic depiction of Muhammad Ahmad.

A black, red and green tricolour with a Shalazieh Baggara lance attributed to the Mahdist movement, reconstructed from a design described in 1952.

Tewfik's acquiescence to British occupation as the price for securing the monarchy was deeply detested by many throughout Egypt and Sudan. With the bulk of British forces stationed in northern Egypt, protecting Cairo, Alexandria, and the Suez Canal, opposition to Tewfik and his European protectors was stymied in Egypt. In contrast, the British military presence in Sudan was comparatively limited, and eventually revolt broke out. The rebellion in Sudan, led by the Sudanese religious leader Muhammad Ahmad, the self-proclaimed Mahdi (Guided One), was politico-religious. After proclaiming himself the Mahdi in 1881, Muhammad Ahmad called his followers the Ansar, meaning "helpers", in reference to the supporters of the Islamic prophet Muhammad in Medina. On 12 August 1881, his followers defeated an Egyptian detachment of approximately 200 soldiers sent by Governor-General Muhammad Rauf Pasha under Muhammad Bey Abu Sa'ud to arrest him at the Battle of Aba.

The death of Hicks Pasha at the Battle of Shaykan in 1883, depicted in an 1896 illustration.

The Mahdists continued their advance across Kordofan, besieging and capturing El Obeid in January 1883. In response, the Egyptian government sent an expedition under Hicks Pasha from Khartoum to retake the province. The force advanced through the arid terrain of Kordofan but suffered from shortages of water and supplies, while Mahdist forces used their knowledge of the region to isolate and exhaust the expedition. These conditions contributed to the decisive Mahdist victory at the Battle of Shaykan in November 1883, which destroyed much of the Egyptian expedition and secured Mahdist control over Kordofan. Following these defeats, the British government decided to evacuate Europeans and Egyptian garrisons from Sudan and sent Charles George Gordon to Khartoum in 1884 to oversee their withdrawal. Gordon became increasingly concerned about the fate of the garrison and civilians in Khartoum and demanded British military assistance. The British government initially refused to send troops, while Mahdist forces besieged the city from March 1884, cutting off its communications and supplies. After a siege lasting nearly ten months, Khartoum fell to the Mahdists on 26 January 1885, while a British relief expedition under Garnet Wolseley arrived two days later.

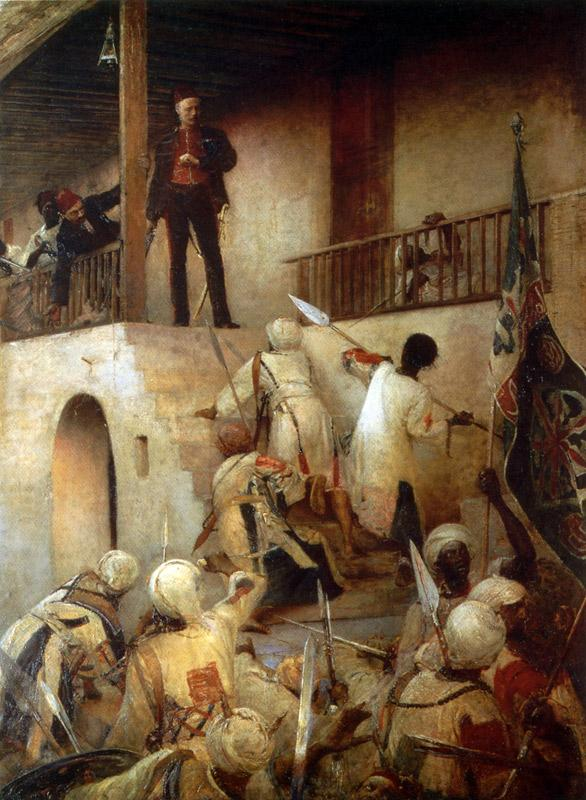
An artistic depiction of Gordon at the Siege of Khartoum.

After the capture of Khartoum on 26 January 1885, Muhammad Ahmad consolidated the Mahdist State and sought to replace the Egyptian administration with institutions based on the Mahdiyya and his interpretation of Islamic law. The conquest was accompanied by widespread violence. Mahdist forces killed members of the Egyptian garrison and thousands of the city's inhabitants. Women and children were also captured. Thereafter, many survivors were relocated to Omdurman, while much of Khartoum was dismantled or abandoned. Ahmad also ordered other Sufi orders within his territory to disband. Instead, his followers, known as the Ansar, developed into the dominant religious movement. They came from different ethnoregional backgrounds. These included the Baggara of Kordofan and Darfur, the Nuba, the Ja'alin and Danagla of northern Sudan, and the Hadendoa of the eastern Beja. Their shared religious allegiance helped unite these communities, although their political interests differed.

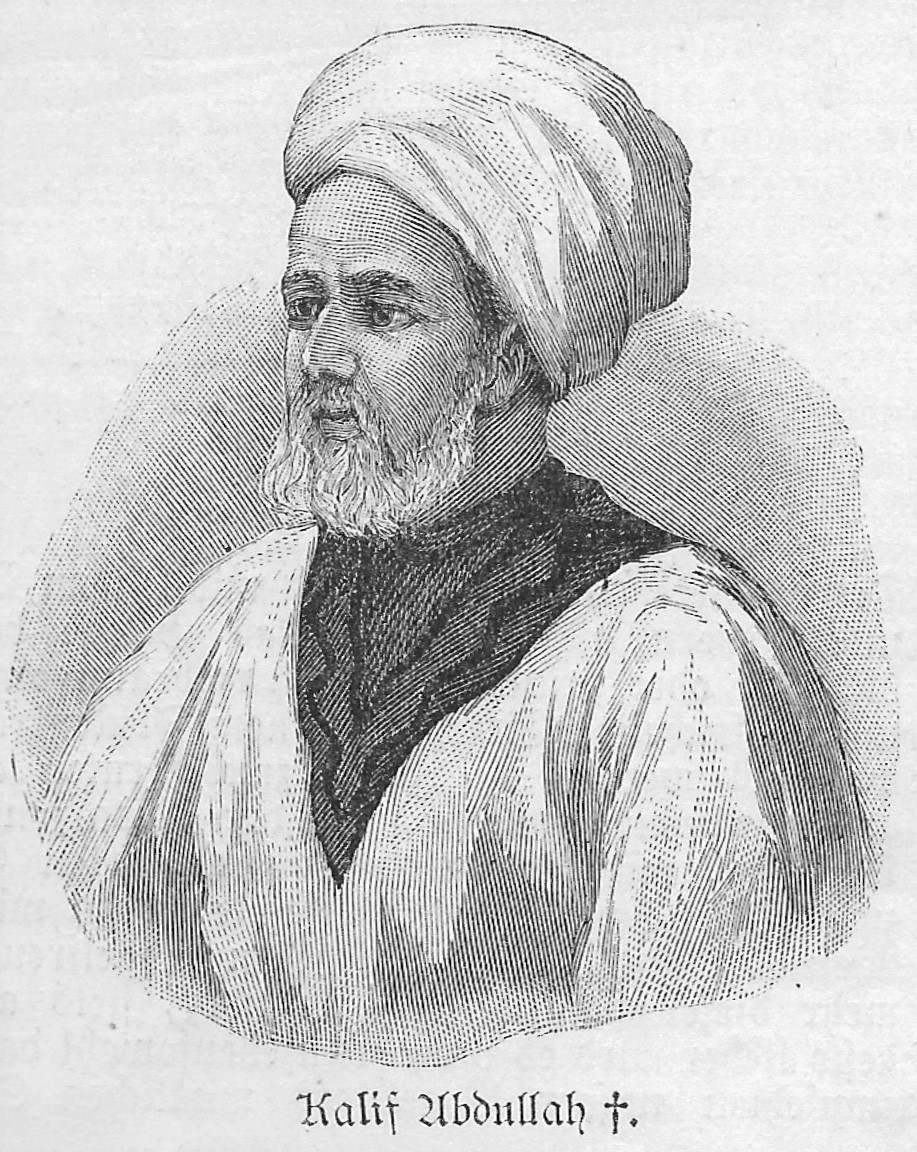
A modern artistic depiction of Abdallahi ibn Muhammad.

Ahmad then died in June 1885 and was succeeded by Abdallahi ibn Muhammad, a member of the Ta'isha Baggara of southern Darfur. His succession strengthened the influence of western Sudanese communities. However, the Ahmad relatives and rival commanders challenged his legitimacy. He therefore sought to consolidate the state around his own supporters. The movement also maintained connections with Islamic communities in West Africa. Abdallahi's family and core supporters had links with the Tijaniyyah order, as the Fulani scholar Muhammad al-Dadari was instrumental in his succession. These networks connected Abdallahi with orders across the Sahel. Hayatu ibn Sa'id, a great-grandson of Usman dan Fodio, leader of the Fulani jihad, likewise promoted Mahdism within the Sokoto Caliphate and Adamawa.

An 1896 map of Khartoum and Omdurman.

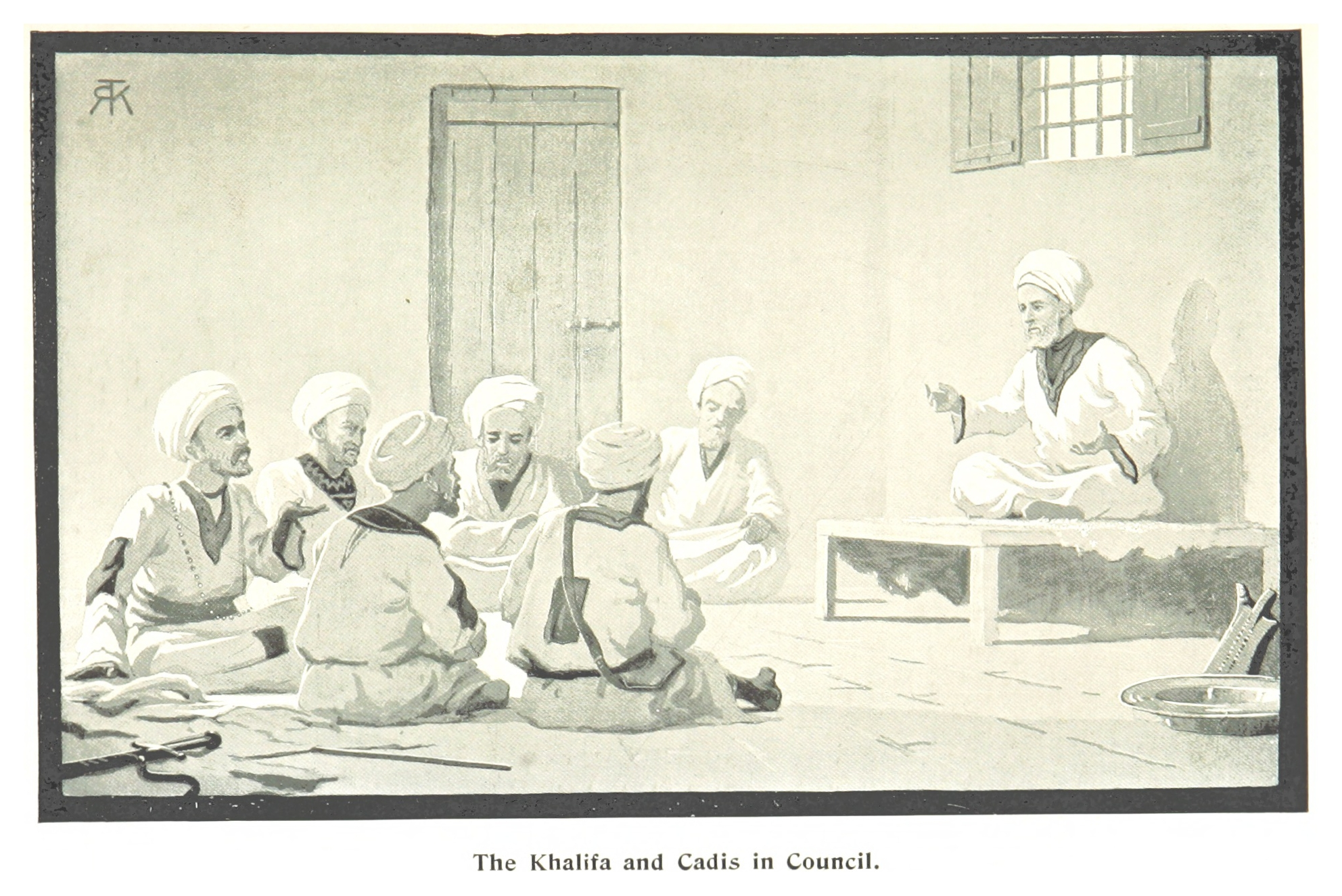
Abdallahi ibn Muhammad meeting with his judges, depicted in an illustration published in 1896.

Initially, the Khalifa established his Islamic state at Omdurman. Paradoxically, he sought to consolidate power through provincial commanders, resembling the Egyptian administration that the Mahdist movement had overthrown. Against this background, he collected taxes and mobilized recruits. Under these circumstances, the capital required reinforcements. Following these developments, he strengthened his own authority. In response to military needs, he relocated warriors and their families from western Sudan. As tensions grew, these measures challenged local autonomy. Meanwhile, in 1886, inhabitants of the Gezira region and other areas were ordered to resettle in Omdurman. Consequently, these population movements reinforced the capital. In the aftermath, officials imposed taxes on agricultural production and trade. Over time, they also confiscated food and property. Eventually, these policies increased provincial unrest, leaving behind grievances against the state.

The execution of the Batahin by hanging, beheading with swords, and spearing with Baggara lances (Shalazieh).

The Mahdists now imposed demands that increased unrest among several Sudanese communities. Similarly, the Shukria of the Butana resisted the Khalifa's authority, whereas their chief, Awad al-Karim Pasha Ahmad Abu Sin, was imprisoned and died in captivity in 1886. Compared with the Shukria, the Kababish of Kordofan faced direct military attacks in 1887. Mahdist forces seized their camel herds and property. Nevertheless, these campaigns destroyed relations with communities that had previously supported the movement. In 1888, Abdallahi publicly executed and mutilated 67 Batahin men in Omdurman as collective punishment against those who went from Gezira to his new capital.

An illustration of Al-Nujumi in the Battle of Toski in 1889.

At first, resistance grew among the Rizeigat and Fur of Darfur. Gradually, Abu Jimeiza mobilized the Tama and Daju of Dar Sila. Opposition increasingly challenged the Khalifa until the rebellion was defeated in February 1889. More severely, Mahdist forces sacked Gondar in 1888. Furthermore, they fought Yohannes IV, who was killed at Gallabat in 1889. Beyond this, expansion reached Egypt. Even more forces were committed, to such an extent that military ambitions no longer remained confined to Sudan. The invasion finally ended in defeat at Toski in August, limiting further expansion.

Although campaigning towards Egypt, Mahdist forces plundered Nubia. While requisitioning grain and livestock fodder from Mahas and Sukkot, troops looted villages near Dongola, Ahmad's homeland, whereas inhabitants resisted or fled to Wadi Halfa and further north to Egypt. Despite resistance, settlements were abandoned.

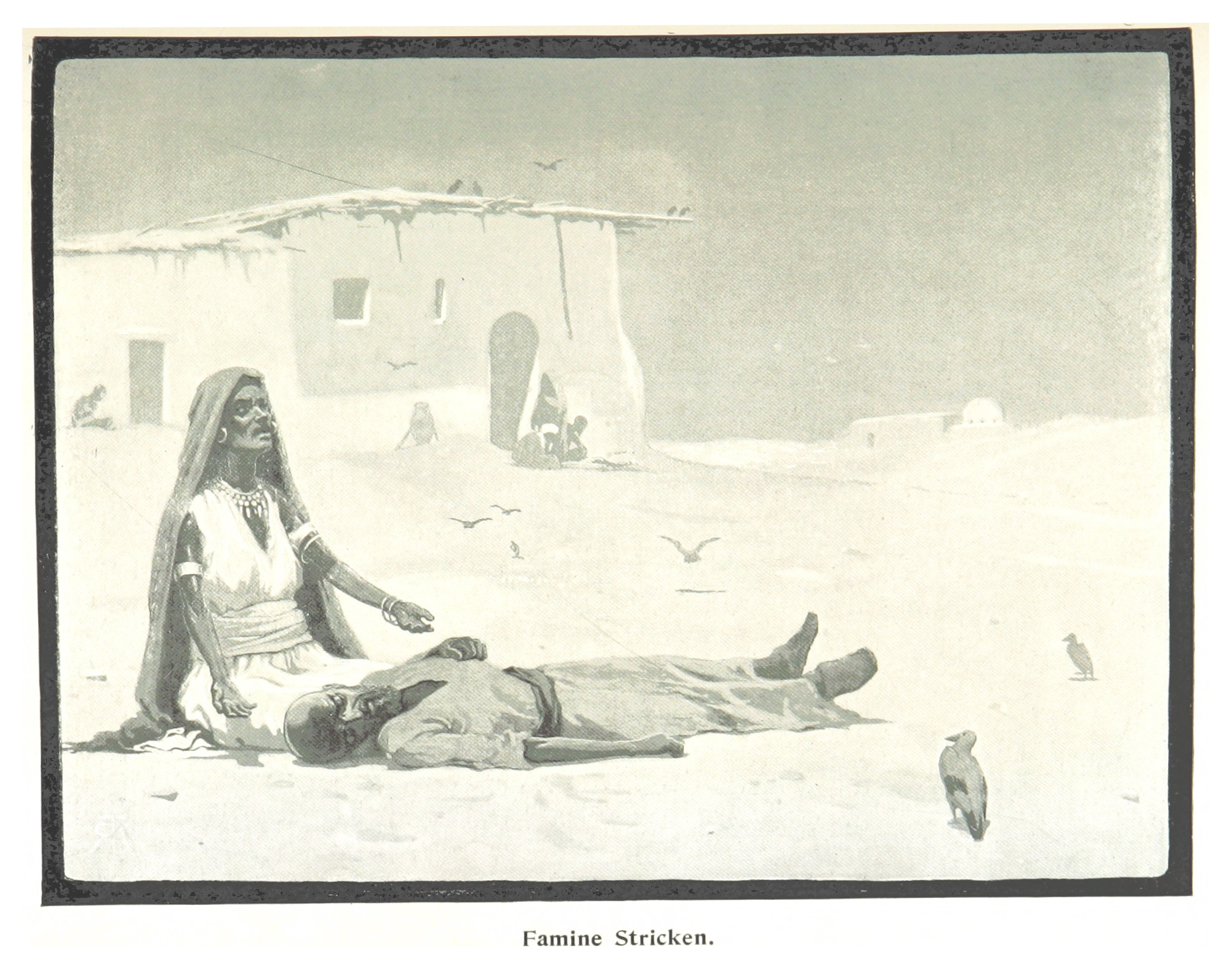
Famine-stricken inhabitants of Sudan, illustrated in Rudolf Slatin's Fire and Sword in the Sudan (1896).

Warfare intensified the famine of 1888–1890. Yet requisitions continued amid economic and demographic collapse. Eastern Sudan suffered additional devastation from livestock disease and disrupted trade with other regions. Starvation resulted from several causes. Grain shortages caused by grain demands from other reigons of Sudan also destroyed pastoral livelihoods. Widespread hunger and mortality followed. The crisis persisted into 1891.

The Khalifa suppressed the Ashraf and Danagla opposition in 1891. Though his continued confiscations provoked further resistance in the Gezira.

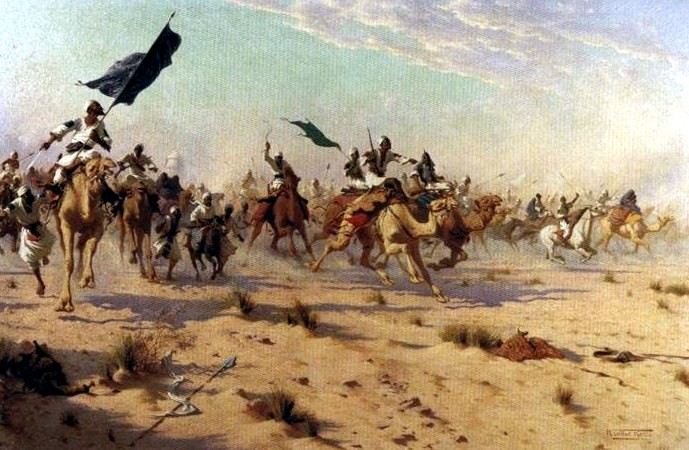
The Flight of the Khalifa, depicting the aftermath of the Battle of Omdurman in 1898, with black and green banners but no red flags.

Tensions intensified until persecution gave way to organized violence, as armed forces advanced, attacked, massacred and expelled inhabitants while destroying settlements, seizing livestock, burning crops and disrupting trade. In 1897, the Ja'alin of Al-Matamma, under Abdallah wad Saad, resisted the Khalifa's demand to accommodate his army for fear that their actions would result in plunder and rape. The forces under Mahmud Ahmad attacked the town, killing Saad and thousands of inhabitants. As a result the Ja'alin supported the Anglo-Egyptian conquest of Dongola and Sudan. Continuing jihad prevented recovery and gradually weakened the authorities until their power eventually collapsed, leaving behind ruined and abandoned settlements, fragmented communities and consequences that endured for generations. The Khalifa lost Omdurman at the Battle of Omdurman on 2 September 1898 and died at the Battle of Umm Diwaykarat in November 1899. The Mahdist State collapsed, although the Ansar survived as a religious order. Sudan's population declined from 7–8.5 million before the Mahdist revolt in 1881 to 2–3.5 million by the collapse of the Mahdist State in 1899.

== History ==
Flag of the governor-general

=== Reconquest and the Dongola campaign (1896) ===
After a series of Mahdist defeats, Tewfik's son and successor, Abbas II, and the British decided to re-establish control over Sudan. The reconquest was not only intended to restore Egyptian control over Sudan but was also motivated by European colonial competition, particularly with France, whose expansion towards the Upper Nile threatened British interests in northeastern Africa. Following Italy's defeat at the Battle of Adwa in March 1896, Britain authorised an advance towards Dongola to divert Mahdist forces from the Italian-held garrison at Kassala and counter French ambitions in the Nile Valley.

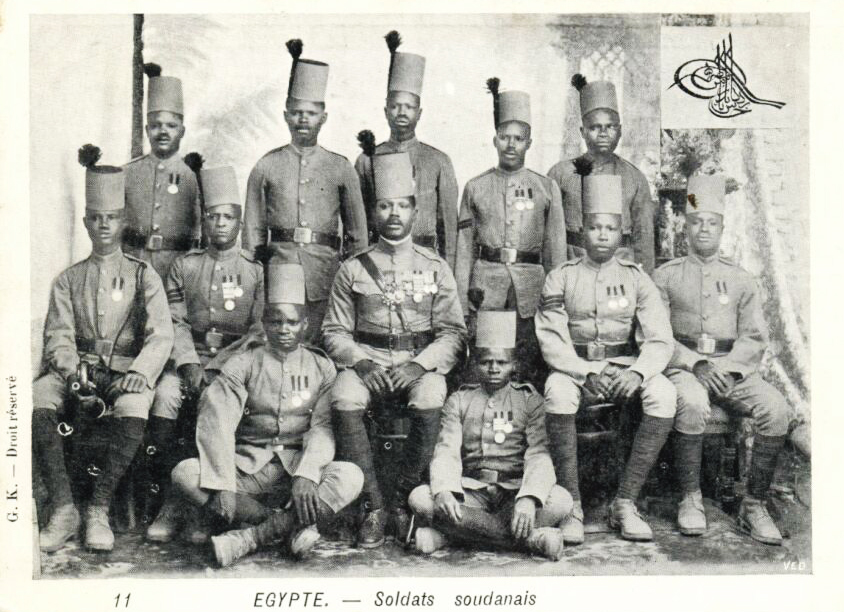
Sudanese soldiers in the Egyptian army, 1899

Leading a joint Egyptian-British force, Kitchener campaigned from 1896 to 1898. Although British troops formed only a small part of the invading army, the campaign was British-led and relied heavily on Sudanese and Egyptian soldiers. They were deployed to fight the Mahdist State, which had controlled much of Sudan since 1885. To maximise Sudanese invasion manpower, the Suakin garrison was replaced with Indian soldiers, releasing battalions for the Dongola expedition.

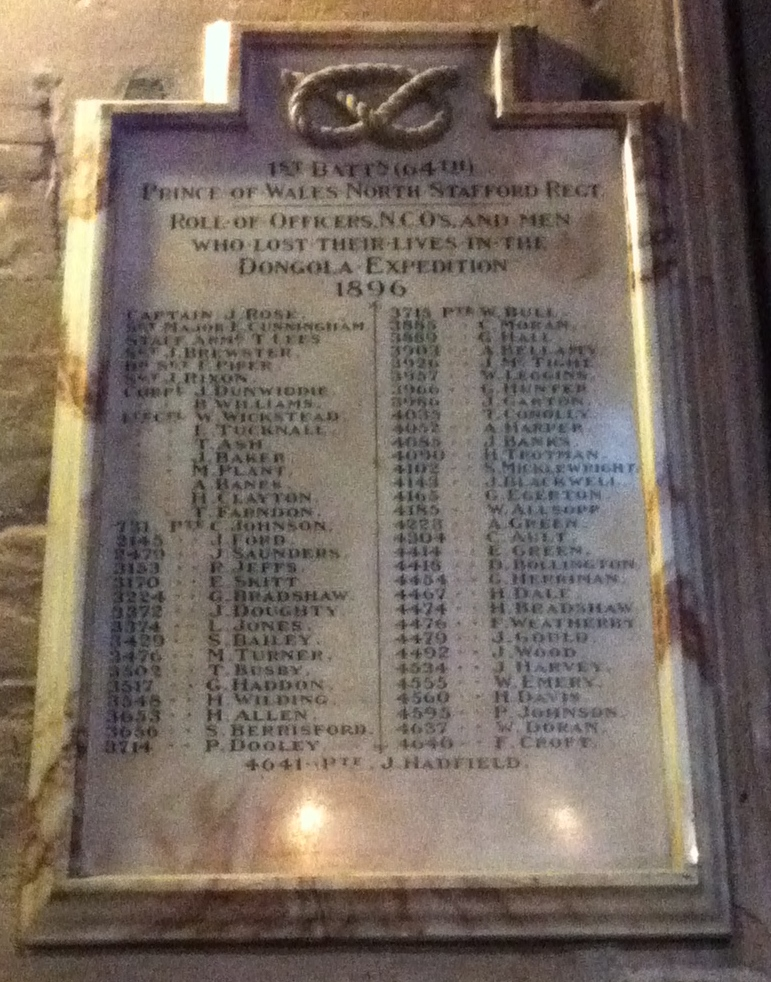
Memorial to the 1st Battalion 64th Prince of Wales North Staffordshire Regiment in Lichfield Cathedral

The Egyptian army moved south from Wadi Halfa on 18 March, occupying Akasha on 20 March. At the Battle of Ferkeh on 7 June, Sudanese and Egyptian columns defeated 3,000 Mahdist soldiers under Hammuda Idris and Osman Azraq, killing 800.

Kitchener then assembled supplies and gunboats at Kosheh. Delayed by the Nile's late flood, the boats crossed the second cataract from 14 August. Cholera killed over 900 Egyptian soldiers.

In September, Wad Bishara resisted the gunboats near Kerma before withdrawing to Dongola. Kitchener reached Dongola on 23 September, followed by Merowe and Korti. Sudanese and Egyptian losses were one killed and 25 wounded. Kitchener was promoted to Major-General.

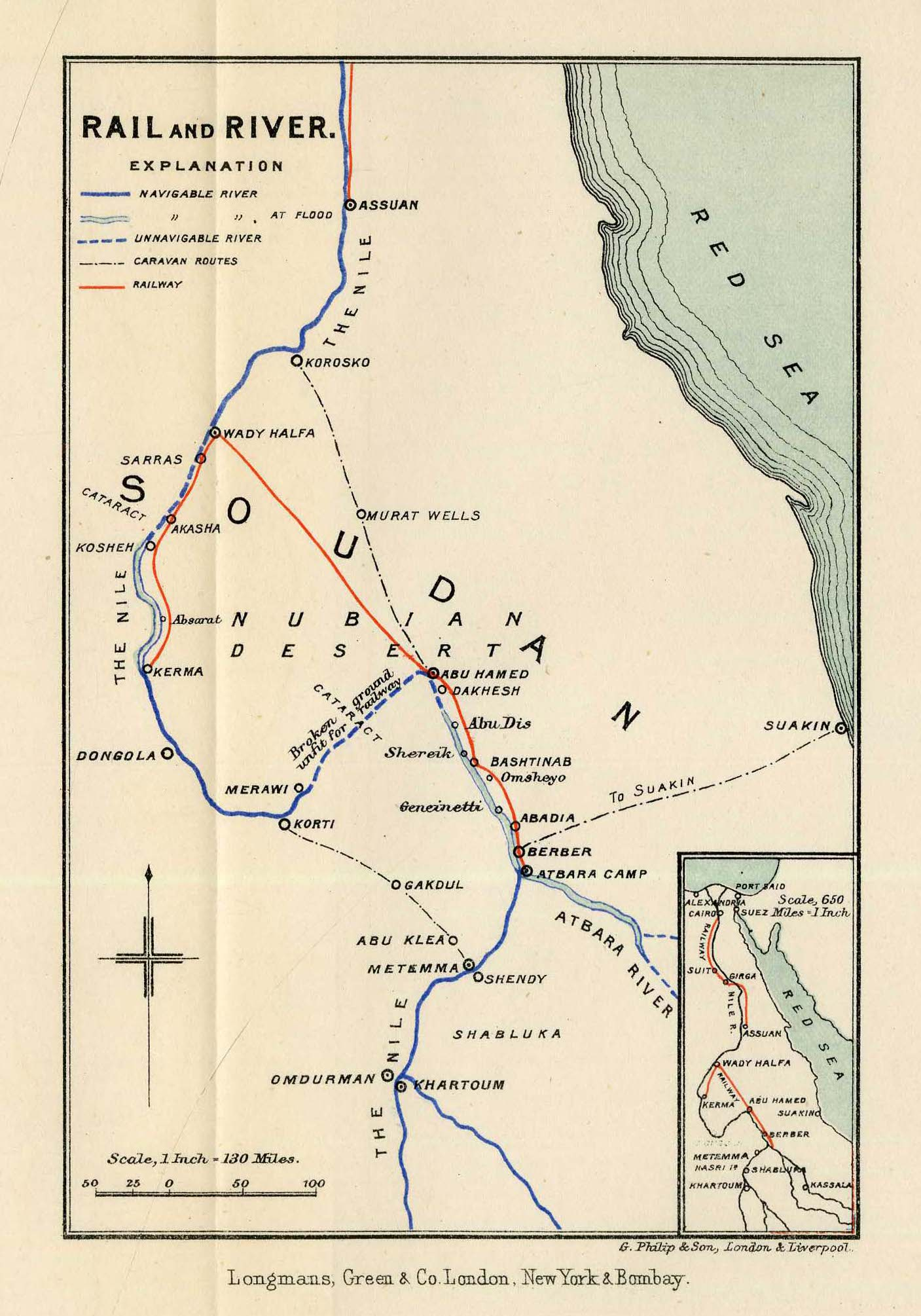
Railway and river routes during the Sudan campaign.

To support the advance, Kitchener constructed the Sudan Military Railroad from Wadi Halfa towards Abu Hamad in 1896–1897, allowing troops and supplies to bypass the Nile cataracts.

=== The end of Mahdist rule (1898–1900) ===
Map of the first Mahdist attack at the Battle of Omdurman.

Kitchener's campaigns culminated in the Battle of Atbara, and the Battle of Omdurman.

The Battle of Omdurman, took place on 2 September 1898 and caused heavy Mahdist casualties. The battle was later commemorated in Sudanese patriotic poetry by Abdel Wahid Abdallah Yousif, a poet belonging to the Ja'alin:

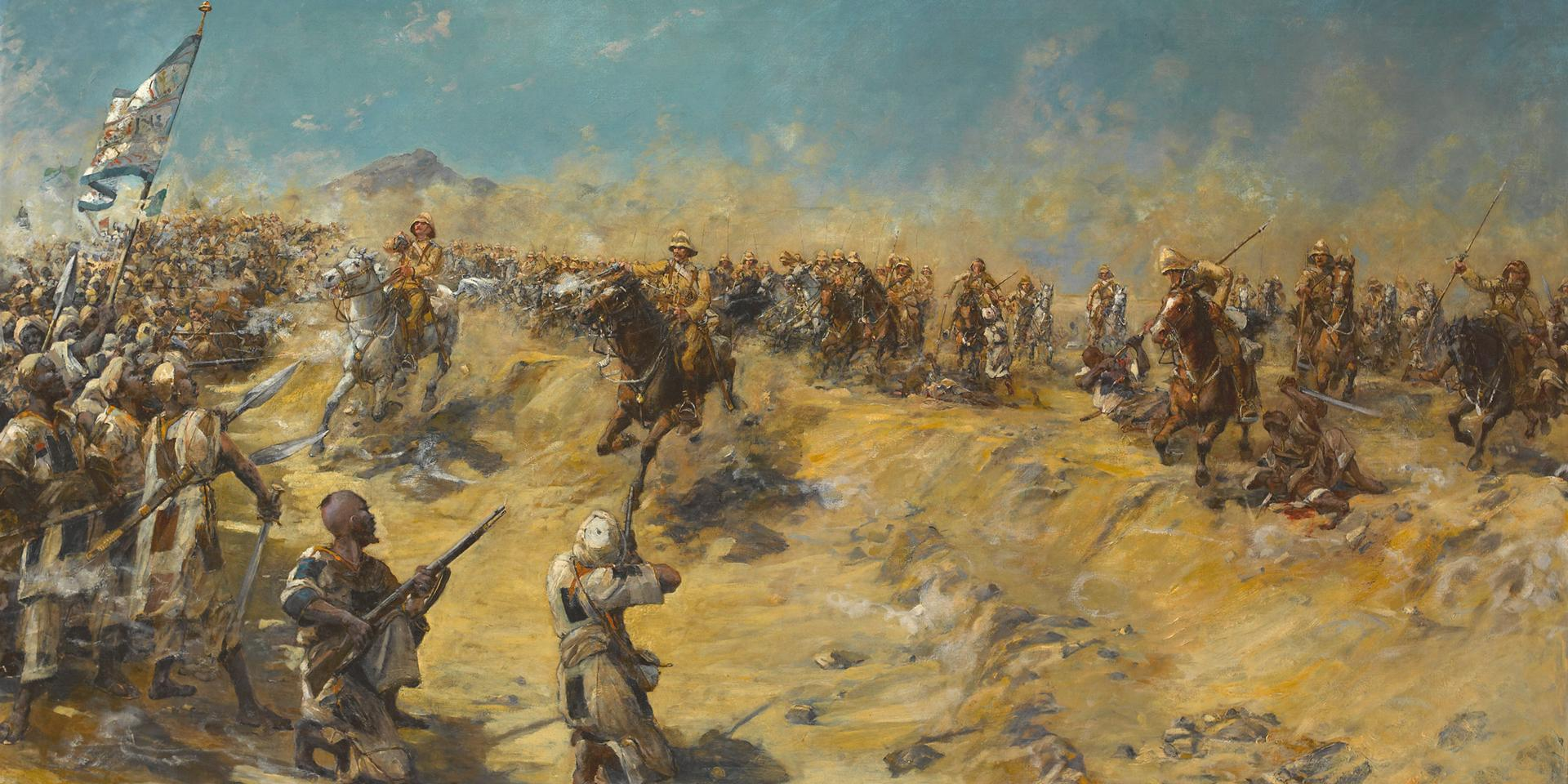
Charge of the 21st Lancers at Omdurman, 2 September 1898

Through raging flames they charged, and scattered the invader hordes.
Our valiant knights never yielded; the tyrant's host fled in defeat.

— Abdel Wahid Abdallah Yousif, Today We Raise the Flag of Our Independence

Reports of troops killing wounded Mahdist fighters led to controversy in Britain. After the battle, British forces also destroyed Muhammad Ahmad's tomb in Omdurman, exhumed his body and removed his head.

Mahdist resistance continued after the loss of their capital. During 1899, the forces of Abdallahi, of the Ta'isha Baggara, faced attacks by the Gawamaa and other Ja'alin and Arab tribes in Kordofan. On 24 November 1899, an Anglo-Egyptian force under Reginald Wingate, mostly the 9th and 13th Sudanese battalions of the Egyptian army, defeated the Khalifa's remaining army at the Battle of Umm Diwaykarat. The 9th Battalion, commanded by Major Doran, advanced towards the position where the Khalifa and several of his commanders were found already dead. Wingate reported that the Khalifa had been killed directly in front of the battalion's advance. Osman Digna, another Mahdist commander, was captured in January 1900.

=== The condominium (1898–1899) ===
Marchand's boat approaching Kitchener's gunboat during the Fashoda Incident, 1898.

The reconquest also brought Britain into conflict with France over control of the Upper Nile. In September 1898, Herbert Kitchener confronted a French expedition under Jean-Baptiste Marchand at Fashoda, triggering the Fashoda Incident. France ordered its forces to withdraw in November, leaving the region under Anglo-Egyptian control.

Exercising the leverage which their military superiority provided, the British forced Abbas II to accept British control in Sudan. Whereas British influence in Egypt was officially advisory (though in reality it was far more direct), the British insisted that their role in Sudan be formalised. Thus, an agreement was reached in 1899 establishing Anglo-Egyptian rule (a condominium), under which Sudan was to be administered by a governor-general appointed by Egypt with British consent.

Under the agreement of 19 January 1899, the governor-general was appointed by Egyptian decree on the recommendation of the British government and could only be removed with its consent. He exercised supreme civil and military authority and could issue laws and regulations for Sudan.

In reality, much to the revulsion of Egyptian and Sudanese nationalists, Sudan was effectively administered as a British imperial possession.

=== Administration ===
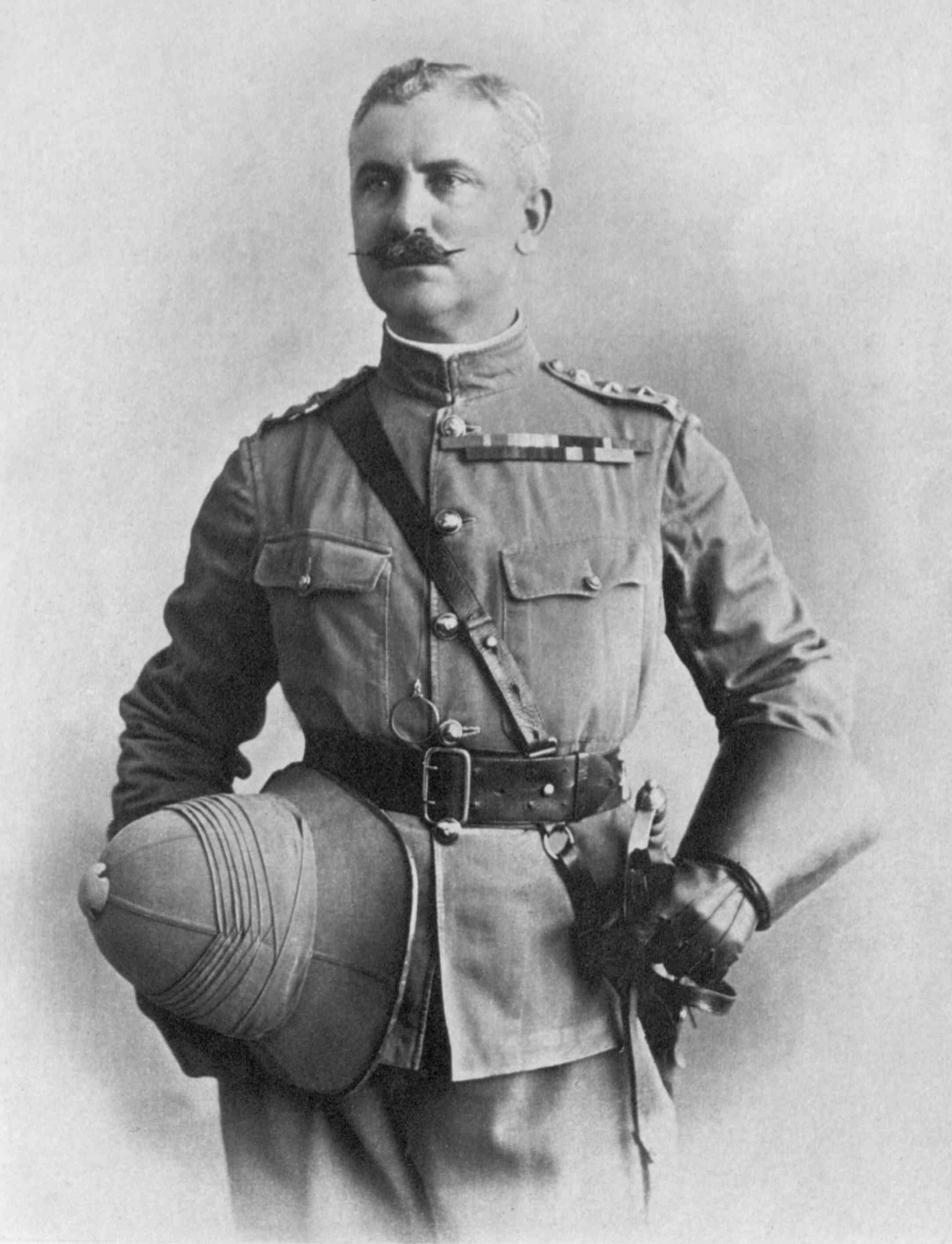
Reginald Wingate, the longest-serving governor-general of Anglo-Egyptian, serving from 1899 to 1916.

After the establishment of the Anglo-Egyptian Condominium in January 1899, Herbert Kitchener was appointed as its first governor-general. After he left Sudan in December of the same year to serve in the Second Boer War, he was succeeded as governor-general by Reginald Wingate. Wingate oversaw most of the administrative development, including the division of Sudan into provinces governed largely by British officers, assisted by inspectors and district commissioners. From 1901, British civilian officials formed the Sudan Political Service, while Egyptians generally held middle-ranking positions and Sudanese occupied lower administrative posts. The administration remained under British control, but in 1910 an executive council was established to assist the governor-general with legislation and financial matters.

The condominium government also introduced penal and procedural codes influenced by those of British India. The sharia and traditional tribal courts were retained as a separate judicial division, chiefly dealing with Muslim personal and family law. Under the 1902 legal reforms, these courts operated under a chief qadi appointed by the governor-general, while civil and criminal cases were generally governed by separate codes.

Following the reconquest, Khartoum was restored as Sudan's administrative capital and rebuilt under Herbert Kitchener. New streets were laid out in a rectangular grid crossed by diagonal avenues, resembling the Union Jack, while government offices, public buildings and residential areas were developed along the Blue Nile. After concluding a treaty with Menelik II of the Ethiopian Empire in 1902, Britain sought to define the boundary between Ethiopia and Anglo-Egyptian Sudan, agreeing to establish a joint boundary demarcation commission. Disputes continued after the agreement, however, and thus the boundary remained contested.

From 1905 to 1909, Wingate oversaw the development of Port Sudan as a new harbour on the Red Sea, following the decision to replace Suakin because its narrow, coral-obstructed harbour could not accommodate larger ships. A railway was built connecting the new port with Atbara. In April 1908, after disputes with local leaders of his Halawin tribe in the Gezira, amid the early development of the Gezira Scheme, Abd al-Qadir Muhammad Imam Wad Habuba, a Mahdist, rallied former Mahdists and launched the Wad Habuba Revolt against Anglo-Egyptian rule. His followers killed the British inspector Scott Moncrieff and the Egyptian district official Muhammad Sharif at Tugur, then attacked government troops at Katfia in May. His followers were defeated by government forces and Wad Habuba fled towards Omdurman, but was captured on the way and publicly executed on 17 May 1908. In 1905, after clashes with Belgian forces, the Azande under Sultan Gbudwe faced an Anglo-Egyptian expedition commanded by Major W. A. Boulnois in Bahr el Ghazal. Government troops entered his territory, where fighting ended in his defeat and capture. He died of his wounds on 10 February, and his kingdom was divided among his sons. Following the death of Leopold II of Belgium in December 1909, Belgian forces withdrew from the Lado Enclave on the Upper Nile under an agreement with Britain. The territory was transferred to Sudan on 16 June 1910, with Chauncey Hugh Stigand appointed its administrator. Boundary changes transferred part of the enclave to the Uganda Protectorate in 1914.

=== Egyptian opposition ===
Pursuing divide and rule, the British were keen to reverse the process, started under Muhammad Ali, of Egyptian-led Nile Valley unification, and sought to frustrate all further unification efforts. During World War I, the British invaded and incorporated Darfur into Anglo-Egyptian Sudan in 1916.

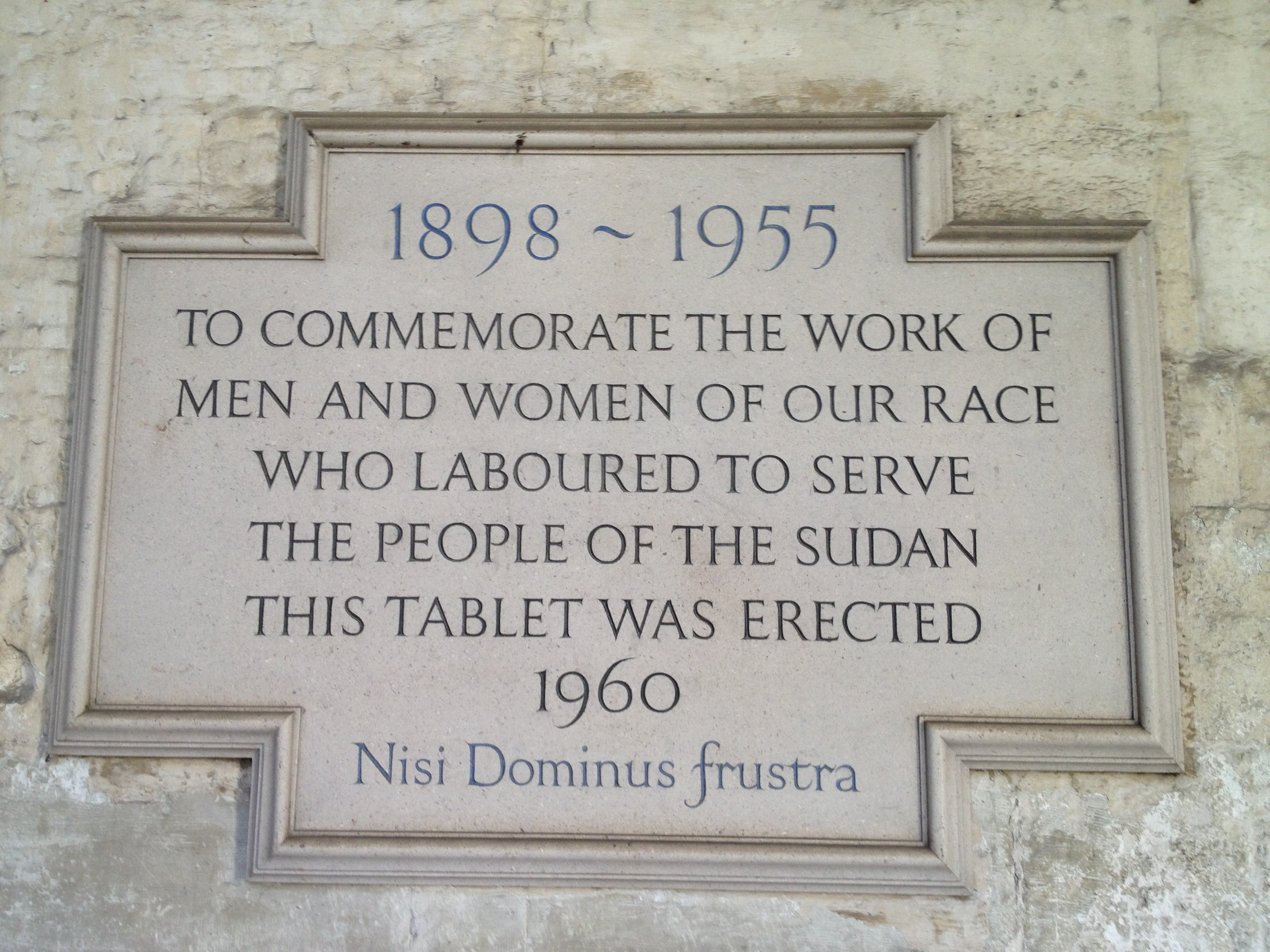
Plaque in the Cloisters of Westminster Abbey, London, to commemorate the British in Anglo-Egyptian Sudan 1898–1955. The abbreviated Latin motto is from Psalm 127:"Except the Lord buildeth the house, they labour in vain that build it."

This policy was internalised within Sudan itself, with the British determined to exacerbate divisions between Sudan's numerous ethnic groups. From 1924 onwards, the British essentially divided Sudan into two territories–a predominantly Muslim Arabic-speaking north, and a predominantly Animist and Christian south, where English was encouraged by Christian missionaries, whose main role was instructional.

The continued British occupation of Sudan fuelled an increasingly strident nationalist backlash in Egypt, with Egyptian nationalist leaders determined to force Britain to recognise an independent Egypt–Sudan union. With the formal end in 1914 of the legal fiction of Ottoman sovereignty, Hussein Kamel was declared Sultan of Egypt and Sudan. Upon his death in 1917, his brother Fuad succeeded him as Sultan Fuad I. The insistence of a single Egyptian-Sudanese state persisted when the Sultanate was re-titled the Kingdom of Egypt and Sudan, but the British continued to frustrate these efforts.

The Cairo government's failure to end the British occupation led to separate efforts for independence in Sudan itself, the first of which was led by Sudanese military officers of the White Flag League in 1924. The group was led by first lieutenant Ali Abd al Latif and first lieutenant Abdul Fadil Almaz. The latter led an insurrection of the military training academy, which ended in their defeat and the death of Almaz after the British army blew up the military hospital where he was garrisoned. This defeat was alleged to have partly resulted from the Egyptian garrison in Khartoum North failing to provide the promised artillery support.

=== Reconstruction and development (1899–1924) ===
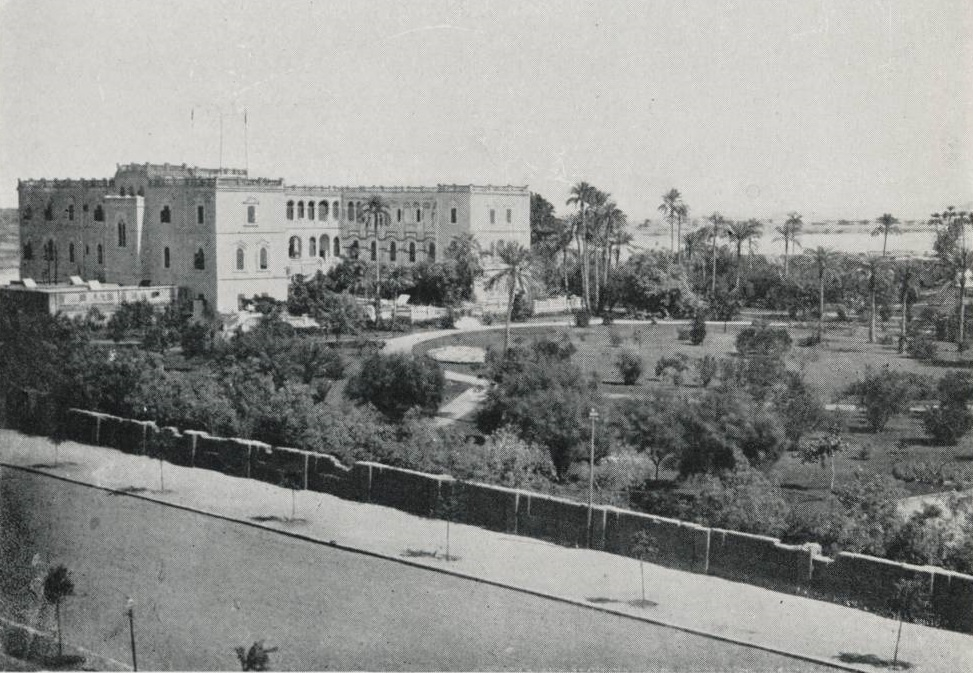
The Governor-General's Palace in Khartoum, 1906.

Following the reconquest in 1898, Khartoum was restored as Sudan's capital. As governor-general, Reginald Wingate expanded provincial administration. Then, in 1900, Rudolf Carl von Slatin became inspector-general, with provincial oversight. Among Wingate's advisers, this former Darfur governor served until 1914. Judicial reforms also followed, to establish new procedures, while Edgar Bonham-Carter became legal secretary in 1899. He introduced Indian-influenced legal codes, and under the 1902 Mohammedan Law Courts Ordinance, Islamic personal law received separate jurisdiction.

Gordon Memorial College, 1906.

In the same period, James Currie developed primary and vocational education. For instance, Gordon Memorial College, opened by Kitchener in 1902, initially provided elementary education, yet later trained teachers, engineers and surveyors because government departments needed skilled workers.

Henry Wellcome, Andrew Balfour and laboratory staff, 1910.

As it expanded, the college housed the Wellcome Research Laboratories, established in 1903 with funding from Henry Wellcome. Under Andrew Balfour, research addressed tropical diseases, sanitation and mosquito control.

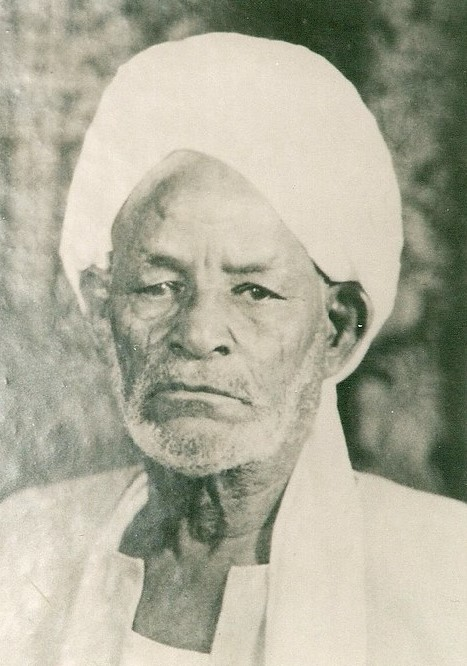
Babikr Bedri, pioneer of girls' education in Sudan.

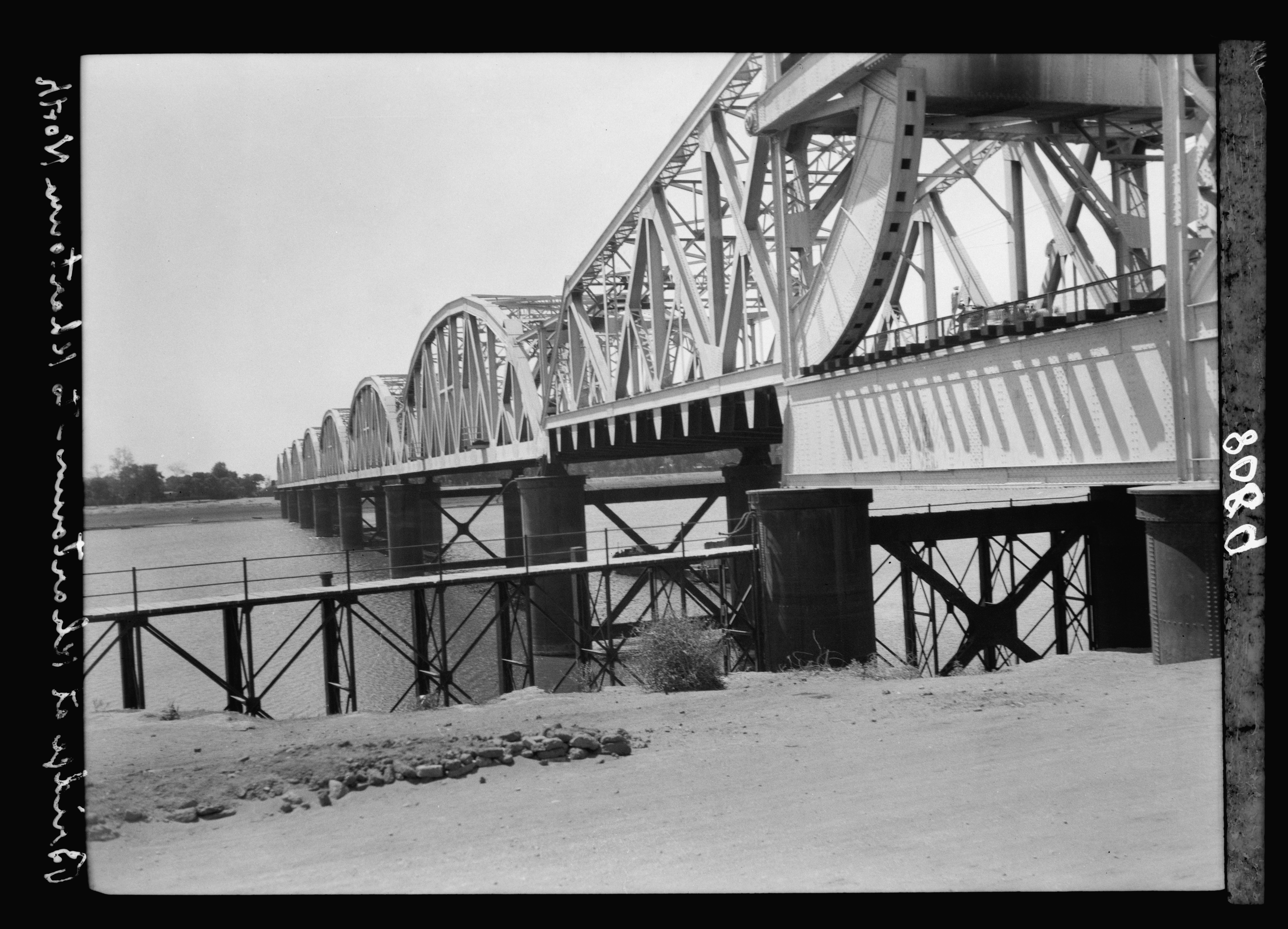
The Blue Nile Road and Railway Bridge, completed in 1909.

With educational recovery came independent initiatives, and in 1907 Babikr Bedri opened Sudan's first modern girls' school at Rufaa, initially enrolling 17 pupils. The school later developed into Ahfad University for Women. Professional education continued developing until 1924, when Lee Stack opened the Kitchener School of Medicine. It enrolled seven students, with Ali Bedri among its first graduates in 1928.

By 1909, the Blue Nile Road and Railway Bridge, designed by Georges Imbault, connected Khartoum and Khartoum North. The city's expansion was directed by William McLean, whose 1910 plan extended streets and regulated residential areas.

Under Wingate, cotton cultivation was developed in the Gezira from 1904 and commercialized through the Sudan Plantations Syndicate, which American businessman Leigh Hunt had founded in 1904, but construction of the Sennar Dam on the Blue Nile was interrupted by World War I. The project continued through pump irrigation until work resumed in 1919, then stopped in 1921 due to rising costs. Construction resumed in 1922 under S. Pearson & Son, with Murdoch MacDonald as designer, Oswald Longstaff Prowde as resident engineer and John Watson Gibson as site agent. The dam was completed in 1925, allowing the Gezira Scheme to expand through irrigation canals. William Garstin had proposed the dam as part of plans to develop irrigation in Sudan.

=== World War I (1914–1918) ===
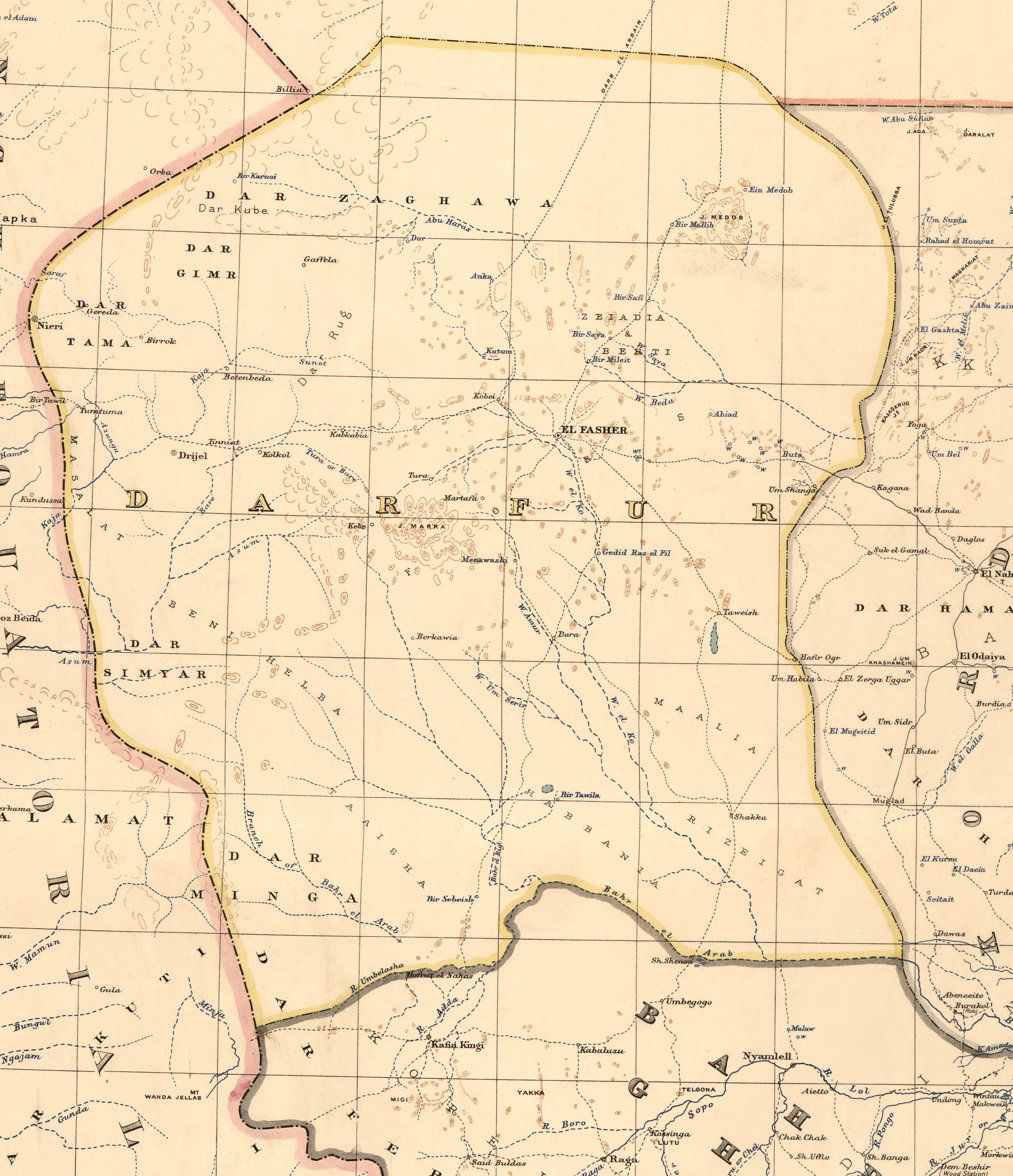
Map of Darfur and its neighbouring territories in 1914.

On 18 December 1914, following the Ottoman Empire's entry into World War I, Britain declared Egypt a British protectorate, ending Ottoman sovereignty over Egypt. The following day, Abbas II was deposed and replaced by Hussein Kamel, who became Sultan of Egypt. The war also affected Sudan's religious leadership. Ali al-Mirghani, leader of the Khatmiyya Sufi order, supported the condominium and opposed Ottoman appeals for jihad against Britain. In November 1914, he sent Wingate a public message condemning the Ottomans. Governor-General Reginald Wingate also sought the support of Abdul Rahman al-Mahdi, the son of Muhammad Ahmad, despite earlier restrictions on the Ansar movement. In 1915, Abdal Rahman toured areas where Mahdism remained influential, particularly among the Baggara and some of the population in the White Nile region, urging his followers to reject the Ottoman call for jihad against Britain. In return for his support, the government relaxed some restrictions on Mahdist activities, enabling Abd al-Rahman to reorganise the Ansar and revive their influence in Sudanese politics. He then visited Aba Island in 1915, where thousands of Baggara and older dervish communities who still believed Mohammed Ahmed was the Mahdi gathered to welcome him in a large demonstration of support, raising British fears. In 1916, they ordered him to return to Omdurman, but his order agents continued organising followers and collecting zakat across the Blue Nile, Kordofan and Darfur regions.

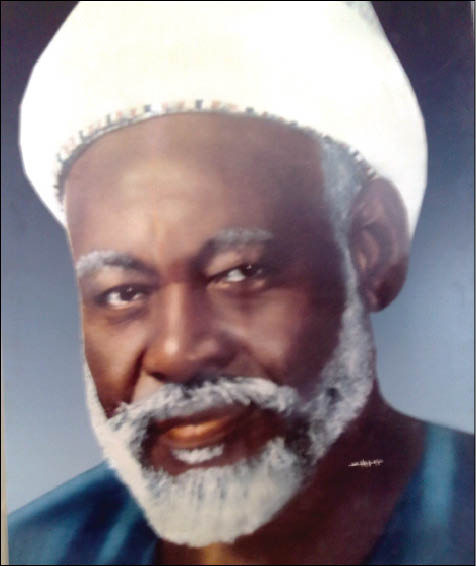
Abdul Rahman al-Mahdi, who supported the British administration during World War I.

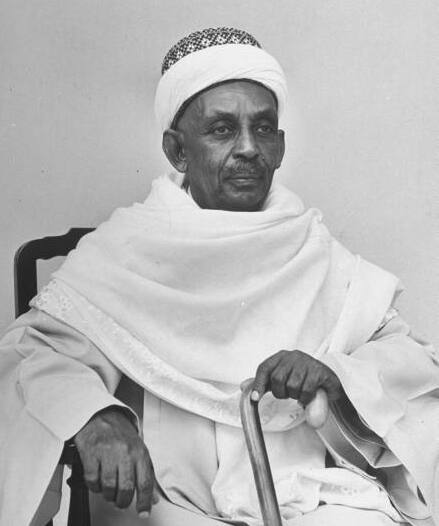
Ali al-Mirghani, a leader of the Khatmiyya order who supported the British administration during World War I.

In the eastern Sahel, Ali Dinar had restored the Sultanate of Darfur following the defeat of the Mahdist State in 1898. The condominium government recognised his rule in 1899 in return for an annual tribute of £500. He restored the sultanate's administration and judiciary and maintained relations with the Wadai Sultanate, the Masalit rulers and the Senussi movement. His attempts to extend his authority westward led to fighting with the Masalit in 1903, while French expansion into Wadai brought disputes over Darfur's western frontier. The relationship between Ali Dinar and Britain was built on a fragile agreement of tribute payments and recognition of his rule in Darfur, and disputes over the frontier and his relations with the Ottoman Empire continued. Following the outbreak of World War I, only months passed before relations deteriorated, as British officials feared Ottoman influence and the Sultan sought support for his rule. This was accompanied by promises of assistance from the Ottomans and contact with the Senussi movement, yet the extent of their influence remained uncertain. In April 1915, Ali Dinar renounced his allegiance to the condominium government and declared support for the Ottomans, and maintained contact with the Senussi during their campaign against British forces in Egypt. Reginald Wingate regarded his actions as a threat to Sudan, and the dispute became a justification for military intervention. British concerns were driven by the possibility of an uprising in Darfur and invasion of Kordofan and by fears of Ottoman and German influence.

Germany also attempted to encourage resistance against British rule in Sudan through espionage. During World War I, the German high command sought to bring Ethiopia into the Central Powers and provoke an uprising in Sudan that could threaten the Suez Canal. With communications to the German legation in Addis Ababa disrupted, messages were sent in cipher through disguised couriers travelling across the Ottoman Empire and Red Sea.

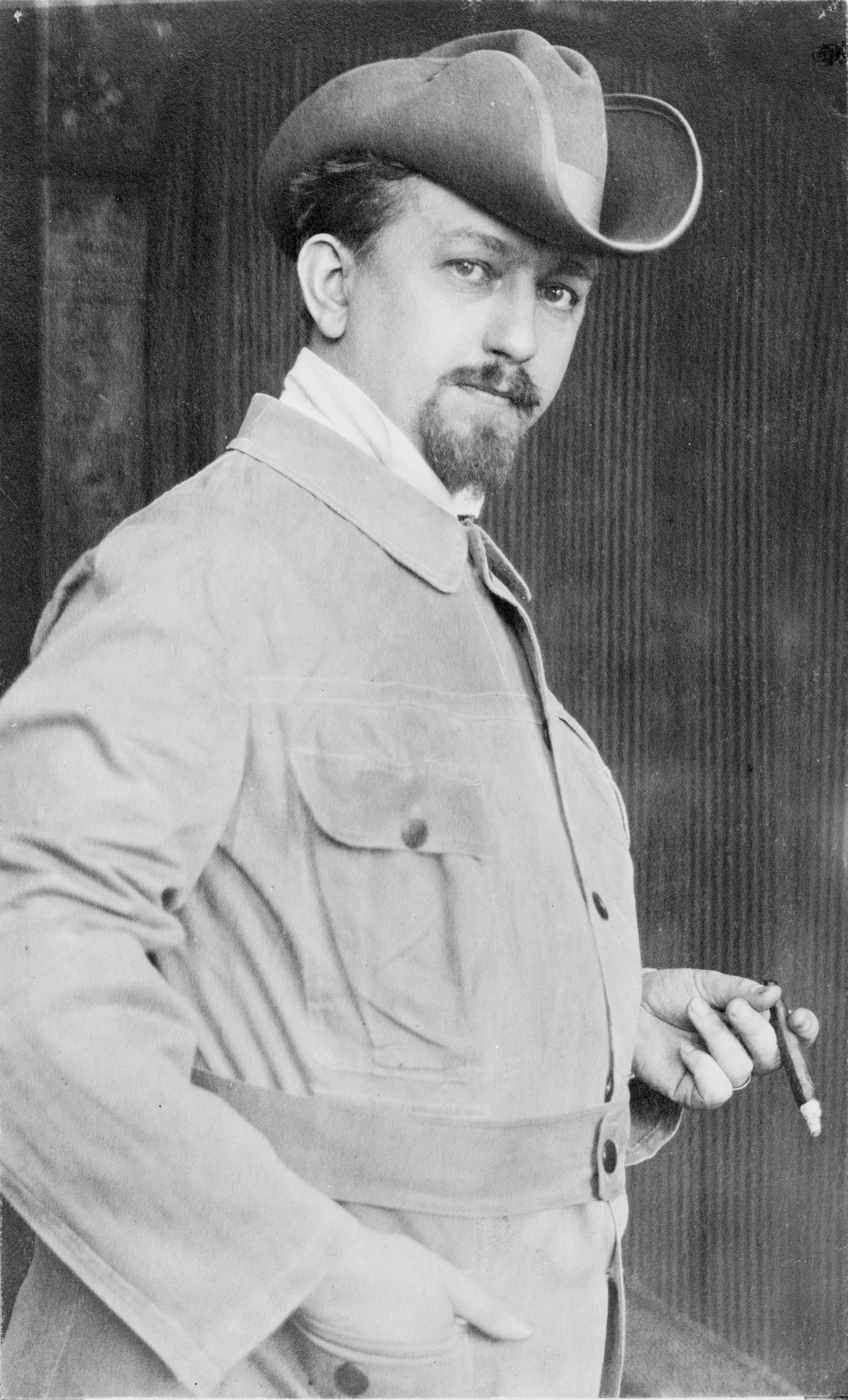
Leo Frobenius, leader of the German expedition of 1914–1915.

To carry out these plans, Germany organised the Seventh German Inner Africa Research Expedition, led by Leo Frobenius between 1914 and 1915. Codenamed HIDDEK, the expedition was a military espionage mission under scientific cover. Supported by Germany and the Ottoman Empire, its approximately seventeen members travelled through Araon 18 December 1914bia, using Arab dress and aliases as cover. Their vessel was repeatedly intercepted by British and French warships before reaching Massawa in Italian Eritrea in February 1915.

British intelligence had already alerted Italian authorities, who discovered material encouraging jihad among Frobenius's possessions. The expedition was forced to leave Eritrea in March without reaching Ethiopia or Sudan. A second mission under Friedrich Salomon Hall followed in June 1915, but he was arrested by Italian police. Nevertheless, his documents reached Ethiopia, where Lij Iyasu subsequently supported Mohammed Abdullah Hassan before being deposed in 1916. The planned uprising in Sudan never occurred.

Although the planned German-backed uprising never occurred, resistance to condominium rule continued through local rebellions. In 1915, Ahmad Umar led a Mahdist uprising in Darfur, while the Miri Nuba tribe resisted the administration in the Nuba Mountains. By March, their chief, Fiki Ali, had planned an attack on the government post at Kadugli with approximately 500 riflemen. The government responded by sending a force of about 1,000 soldiers under Major Hubert Huddleston, including infantry, cavalry and the Camel Corps. The force arrived on 13 April and occupied Tuluk on 20 April, forcing the Miri leadership to submit the following day. Fiki Ali escaped with some followers, and resistance continued in the region during 1917 and 1918.

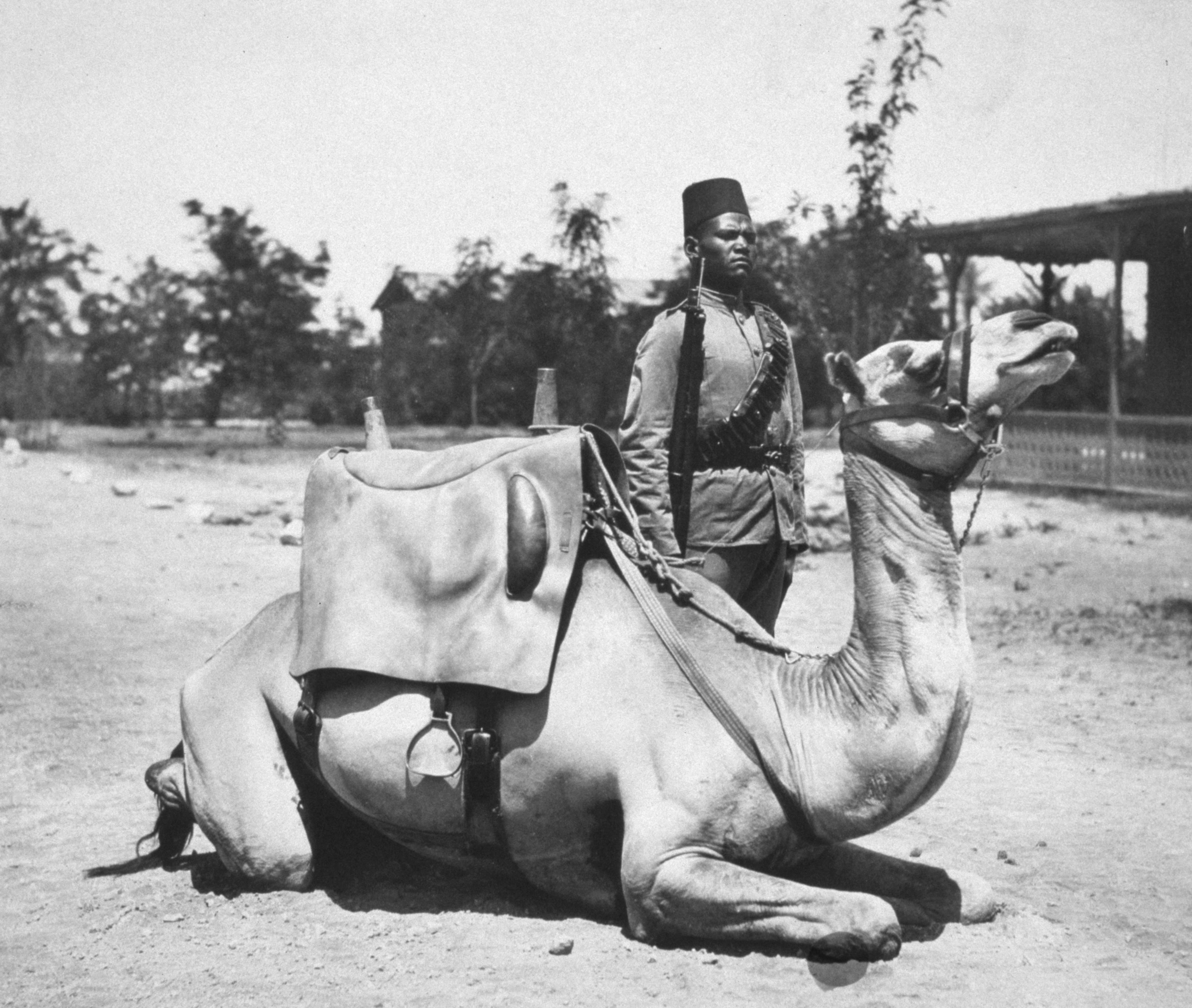
A Sudanese camel soldier in the Anglo-Egyptian forces.

Map of the 1916 campaign in Darfur.

In March 1916, Governor-General Sir Wingate ordered the invasion of Darfur, assembling approximately 2,000 troops under Lieutenant-Colonel Philip James Vandeleur Kelly. The expedition consisted of the 13th and 14th Sudanese infantry battalions, two companies of the Arab Battalion recruited from northern Sudan, two companies of Egyptian infantry, two companies of mounted infantry, five companies of the Camel Corps, and artillery and machine-gun units. After concentrating at Nahud, the force began its advance on 16 March, marching westward into Darfur towards Al-Fashir. Along the route, troops secured wells and established positions to maintain their water supplies and communications, while reconnaissance units moved ahead to locate Fur forces. The advance encountered resistance near Jebel el Hella, where Fur troops attempted to halt the expedition. Kelly's forces responded with artillery and machine-gun fire, forcing the defenders to withdraw. The expedition then occupied the surrounding positions and secured the wells by the end of March, allowing preparations for the continued advance towards Al-Fashir. Aircraft from the Royal Flying Corps also conducted reconnaissance, dropped leaflets and bombed Fur positions. After advancing towards Al-Fashir, Lieutenant-Colonel Philip James Vandeleur Kelly commanded the Anglo-Egyptian forces against the Fur army led by Ramadan Ali at the Battle of Beringia on 22 May 1916. Sudanese and Egyptian troops repelled the Fur attack with artillery and machine-gun fire, defeating the defenders before occupying Al-Fashir the following day. Ali Dinar then withdrew towards the Jebel Marra mountains, but fighting continued at Dibbis and Kulme. On 6 November, a mounted force under Major Hubert Huddleston attacked his remaining followers, killing Ali Dinar and ending the Keira dynasty.

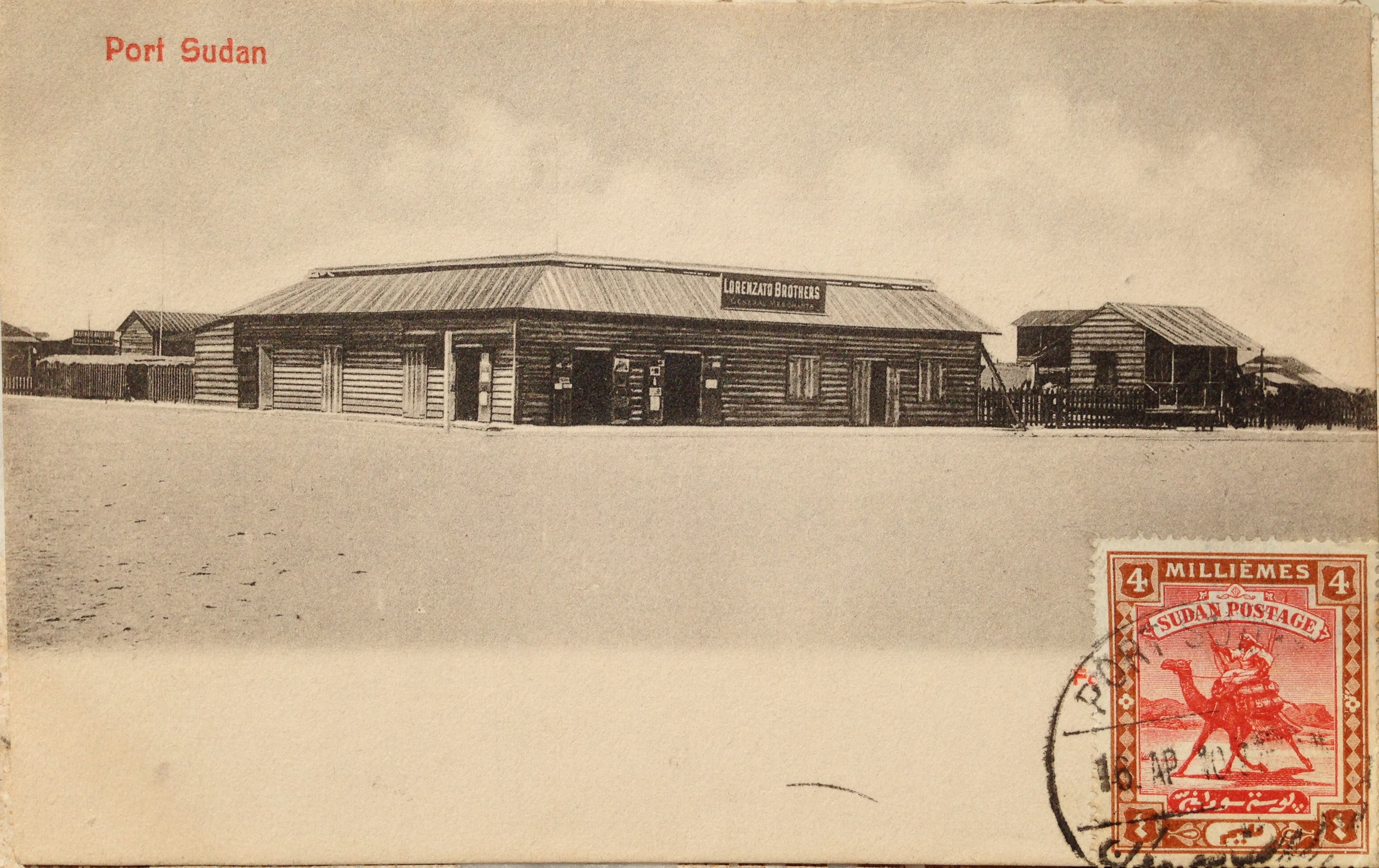
Port Sudan in the 1910s.

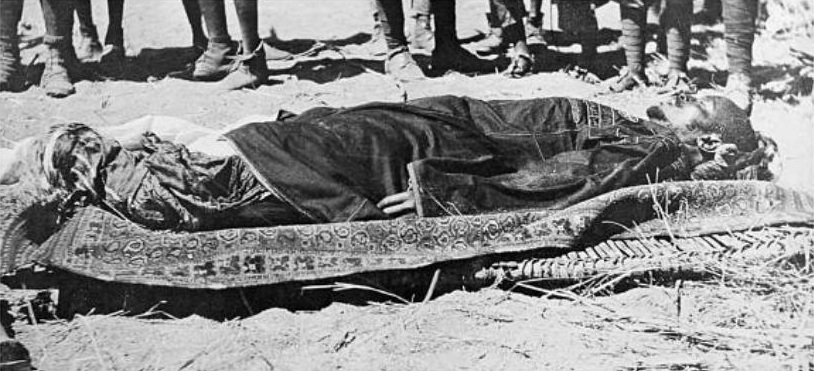
Ali Dinar, the last sultan of Darfur, killed in 1916.

Darfur was annexed to Sudan in 1917, with Kelly becoming its first governor. The former sultanate was reorganised under British administration, although local rulers kept traditional authority through indirect rule and native administration. However, the neighbouring Masalit sultanate of Dar Masalit remained outside direct condominium administration until 1922–1923.

Following the outbreak of the war, the Governor-General expanded Sudan's communications network. In 1915, wireless telegraph stations were established at Port Sudan, Malakal, Nasir and Gambela, thus connecting the Red Sea with the southwestern Ethiopian frontier. Further stations followed in Darfur, Wau and Mongalla between 1916 and 1918, while telegraph lines reached Al-Fashir after its occupation, extending communications into newly occupied territory. In 1917, the government introduced an excise tax on sugar and increased railway and steamer rates. Rising prices raised government revenue, while the surpluses obtained since 1916 were passed to a reserve fund. During the war, demand from British forces in Egypt increased Sudanese exports, with external trade rising from £E3 million in 1914 to £E6.9 million in 1919. The more prosperous conditions which followed eased the financial situation, although prices also rose. In 1918, the administration established Sudan Notes and Records, a serial publication devoted to Sudanese history, archaeology, languages and customs. Proposed by Milo Talbot and supported by Edgar Bonham-Carter, it was organised by John Winter Crowfoot and Wasey Sterry, with Governor-General Lee Stack as patron.

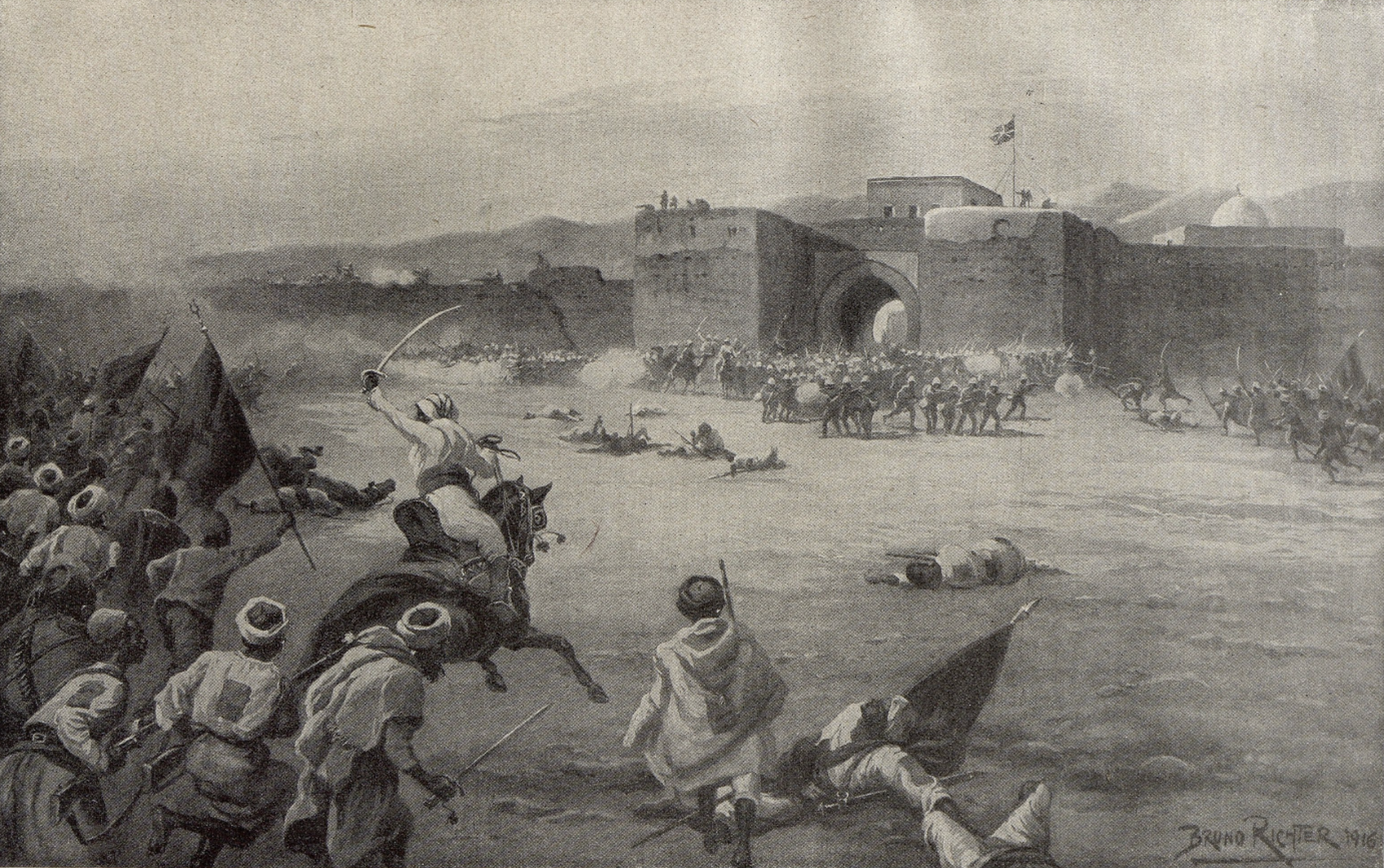
German illustration depicting Ali Dinar's forces attacking British troops during the 1916 invasion of Darfur.

In 1917, Lee Stack succeeded Reginald Wingate as governor-general of Sudan and Sirdar of the Egyptian Army, after Wingate became British high commissioner in Egypt. That year, the Atuot of Bahr el Ghazal again resisted condominium rule, moving their cattle and hiding grain in forests to evade government expeditions. In neighbouring Wadai, French troops killed an estimated 100–150 people, including religious leaders, at Abéché in November 1917 following the killing of a French soldier. Some inhabitants fled towards Sudan and Egypt. After several clashes in the Nuba Mountains in which Captain R. W. Hutton was killed in April 1917, a considerable force was sent in the autumn, and after an arduous campaign the hill tribes submitted in February 1918. In 1918, Sudanese troops aided in operations against the Turkana, who raided along the Sudan–Uganda border, but neither government had forces to station troops permanently in the area.

=== Lee Stack administration (1917–1924) ===
King Fuad I of Egypt in 1924.

The Sudan Schools' Graduates' Club opened on 18 May 1918 in Omdurman. Founded by graduates of Gordon Memorial College and other schools, it was initially devoted to sociocultural activities, but later became the most important centre of Sudanese civilian political activity. Following the closure of Ra'id al-Sudan in 1918, the first fully Sudanese newspaper, Hadarāt al-Sudan, started in February 1919. After their official visit to London, the three sayyids assumed its publication, which became the first Sudanese newspaper with a political and local orientation. The paper published several articles calling for girls' public education, among other improvements to the educational system.

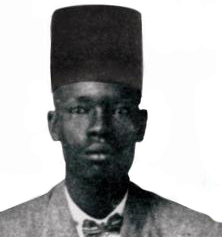
Ali Abd al Latif.

In 1919, a Sudanese delegation led by Ali al-Mirghani visited London to congratulate George V on Britain's victory in World War I. It included Abdul Rahman al-Mahdi and Sharif Yusuf al-Hindi. In a dramatic gesture of loyalty, Abd al-Rahman offered his father Muhammad Ahmad's sword to the King. The 1919 Egyptian revolution also led to political unrest in Sudan. In Atbara, Egyptian railway personnel went on strike in support of the revolution. Following the revolution, Obaid Haj al-Amin, Sulayman Kisha, Tawfiq Salih Jibril and other pro-Egyptian unionists founded the secret Society of the Sudan Union in 1920. Opposing British rule, they supported the unity of the Nile Valley and the Egyptian nationalist movement. In 1923–1924, dissatisfied members joined Ali Abd al Latif in forming the White Flag League. Before joining the White Flag League, Abd al Latif a Dinka officer in the Egyptian army reportedly founded the United Tribes Society in 1921, which called for an independent Sudan governed by tribal and religious leaders. However, historian Hasan Abdin considered it "doubtful whether it existed at all beyond a small number of Ali's associates". Its membership, activities and relationship with the Sudanese Union Society remain uncertain.

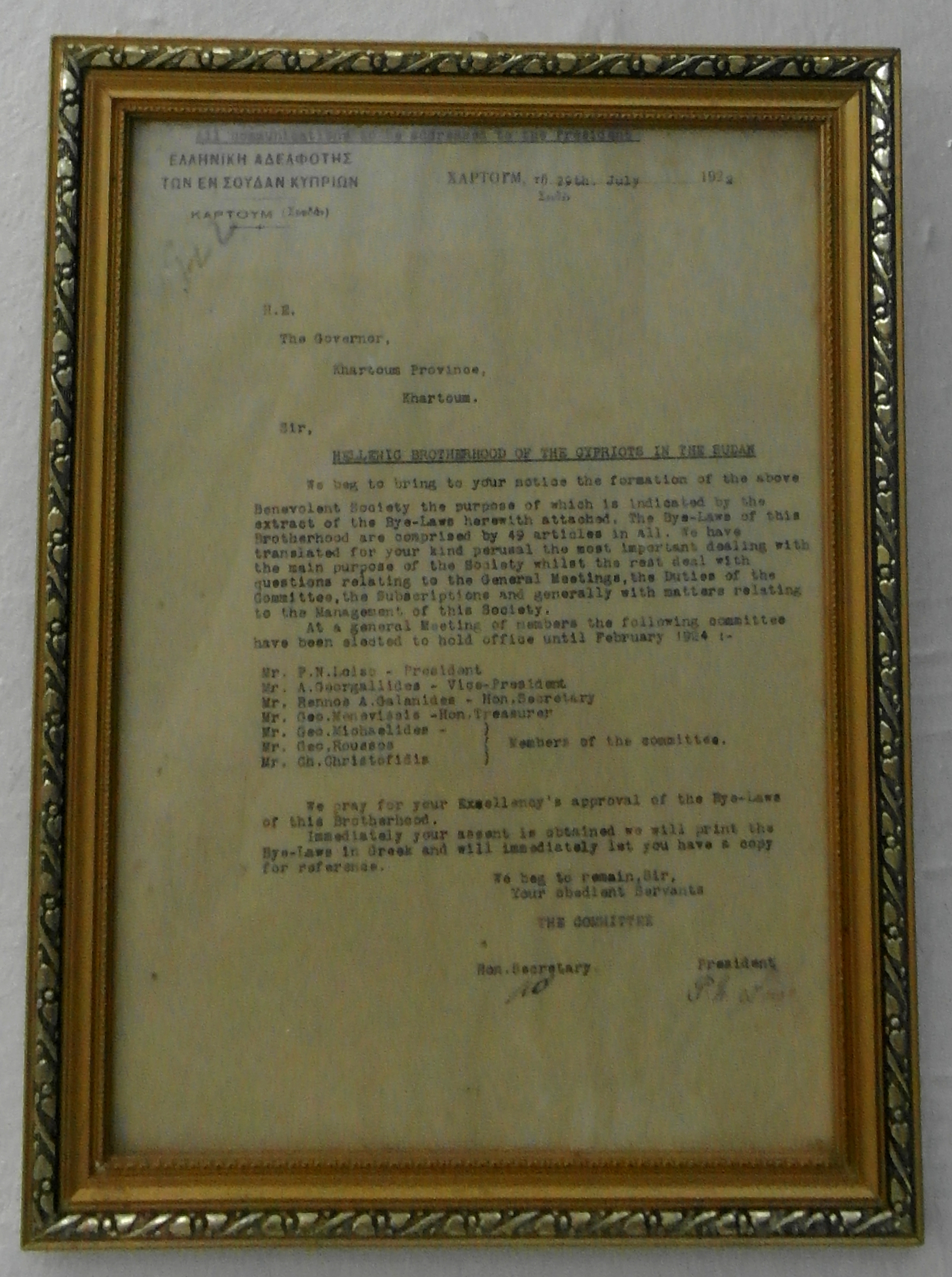
Hellenic Brotherhood of Cypriots in Sudan, 1922.

On 28 February 1922, Britain issued the Unilateral Declaration of Egyptian Independence, declaring Egypt an independent state and terminating the British protectorate. However, four matters were reserved to the discretion of the British government: imperial communications security, the defence of Egypt against foreign aggression or interference, the protection of foreign interests and minorities, and Sudan. Pending the conclusion of agreements with the Egyptian government, the status quo in these matters was to remain intact, leaving the condominium unchanged. In 1922, following the 1919 Egyptian revolution and the Unilateral Declaration of Egyptian Independence, Ali Abd al Latif submitted an article titled The Claim of the Sudanese Nation to Hadarāt al-Sudan. It demanded Sudanese self-determination, expanded education, an end to the sugar monopoly and greater employment of Sudanese in government posts. Although the newspaper declined to publish it, he was arrested and sentenced to one year's imprisonment for allegedly exciting disaffection against the government. His trial received publicity in the Egyptian press. In the House of Commons, his imprisonment was questioned as punishment for loyalty to King Fuad I, an allegation denied by the British government. According to historian Elena Vezzadini, Abd al-Latif initially demanded independence from both Egypt and Britain, but by 1924 had joined the pro-Egyptian movement. Holt and Daly also questioned the British tendency to portray Sudanese opponents of colonial rule as agents of Egyptian politicians.

The Egyptian Constitution of 1923, drafted by a representative commission, was completed by October 1922. The British government and the British high commissioner, Lord Allenby, took exception to the ascription to King Fuad in the draft of the title "King of Egypt and the Sudan", as well as to other clauses referring to Sudan. The constitution was eventually promulgated on 19 April 1923, with the royal title omitted, although Egypt's claimed rights in Sudan were preserved.

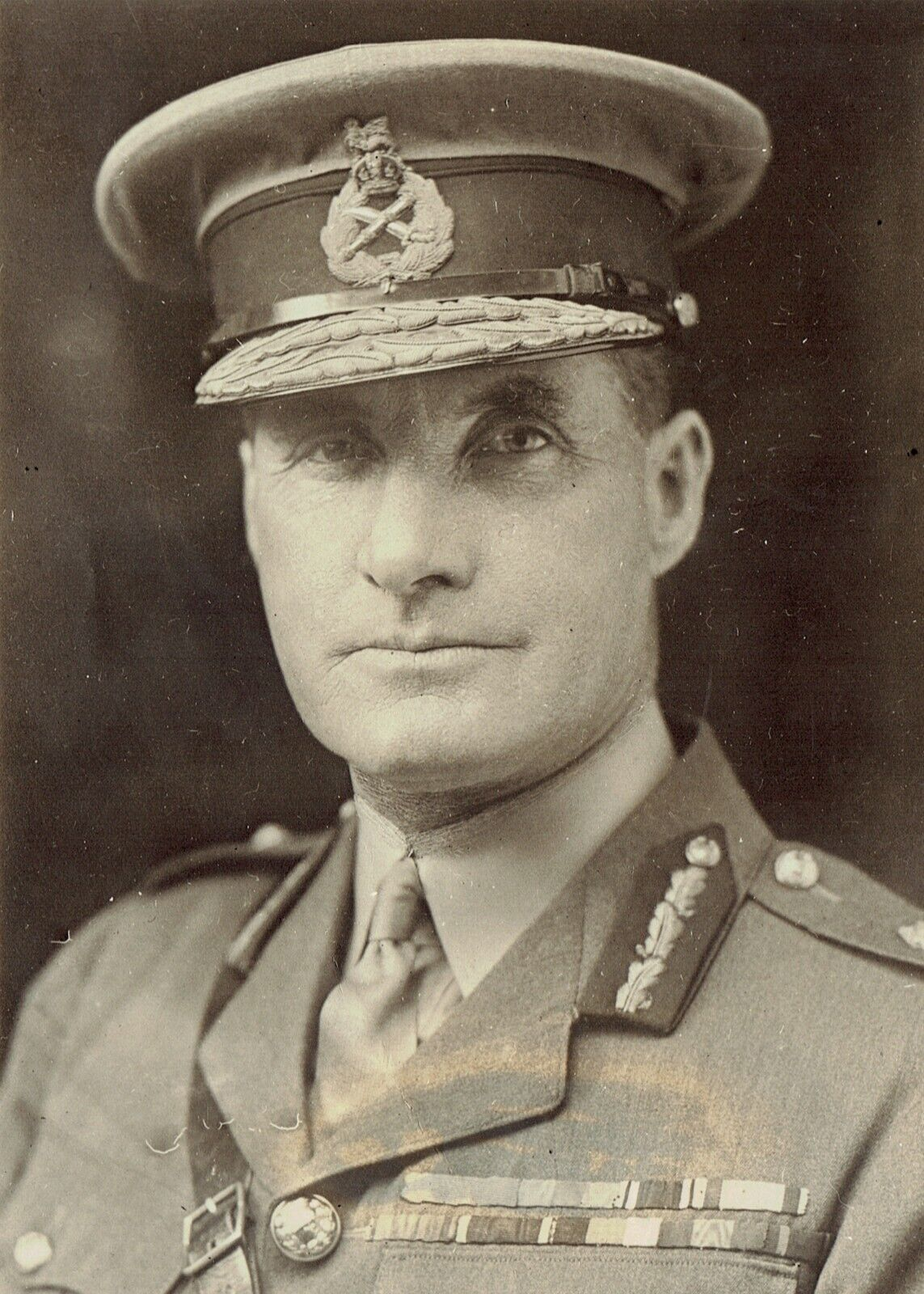
Lee Stack, governor-general of Sudan.

On 15 May 1924, nationalist leaders sent a protest telegram. The White Flag League addressed Sudan's governor-general about political representation. Signatories demanded that Sudanese participate in deciding their political future. They criticised negotiations proceeding without representation from Sudan's own inhabitants. Further telegrams reached Egyptian ministers, British politicians and newspapers abroad.

In June 1924, anti-British demonstrations filled Khartoum and Omdurman streets. Students, clerks, workers, and soldiers publicly opposed continued British rule.

On 4 July 1924, authorities arrested Ali Abd al Latif. Other activists continued organising demonstrations and spreading anti-British sentiment despite increased police surveillance afterward.

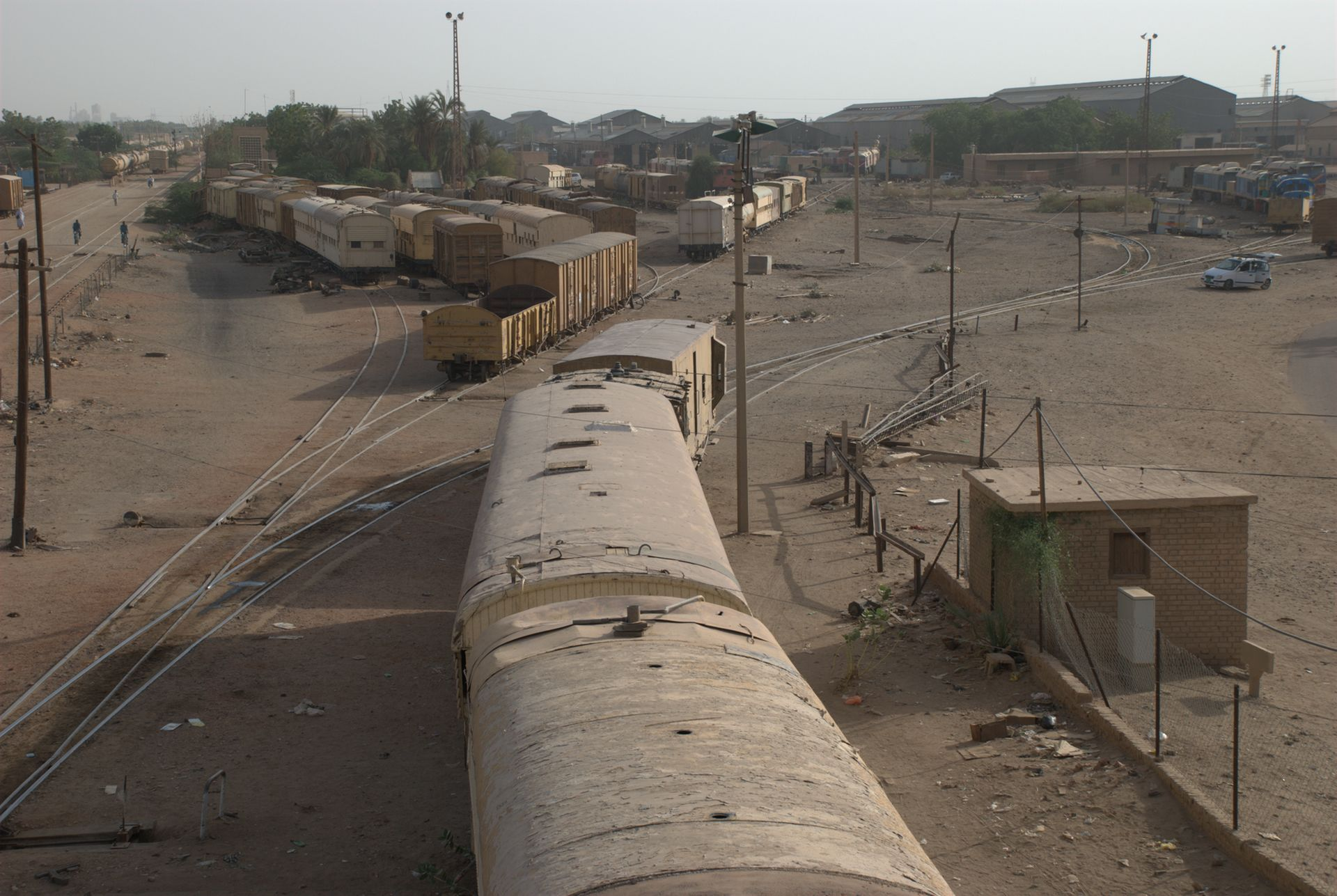
Railway at Atbara.

The movement also spread to the Sudanese forces in the Egyptian Army. In August 1924, fifty-one military cadets demonstrated together in Khartoum. They displayed Egyptian symbols and demanded imprisoned nationalists be released.

On 11 August 1924, railway battalion soldiers mutinied at Atbara. British officers ordered transfers, fearing spreading influence among troops. Officers in Wau and Malakal organised anti-British demonstrations during 1924.

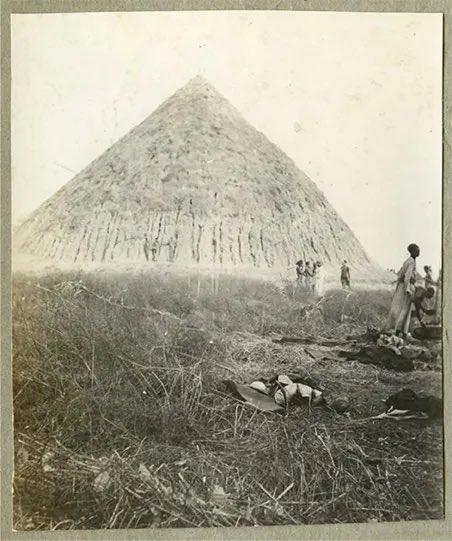
Ngundeng pyramid.

On 19 November 1924, gunmen shot Lee Stack in Cairo. He died the following day.

On 22 November, Allenby demanded Egypt withdraw troops from Sudan. Saad Zaghloul resigned as Britain imposed further demands and penalties. Following the withdrawal of Egyptian troops from Sudan, Abdel Fadil Almaz and his men resisted British forces in Khartoum on 27 November 1924. In 1925, Britain established the Sudan Defence Force.

In 1919, Muhammad Sayyid Hamid led a revolt near Singa. In October, Aliab Dinka fighters pillaged Mingkaman, Awerial County police station, after which colonial troops launched punitive expeditions.

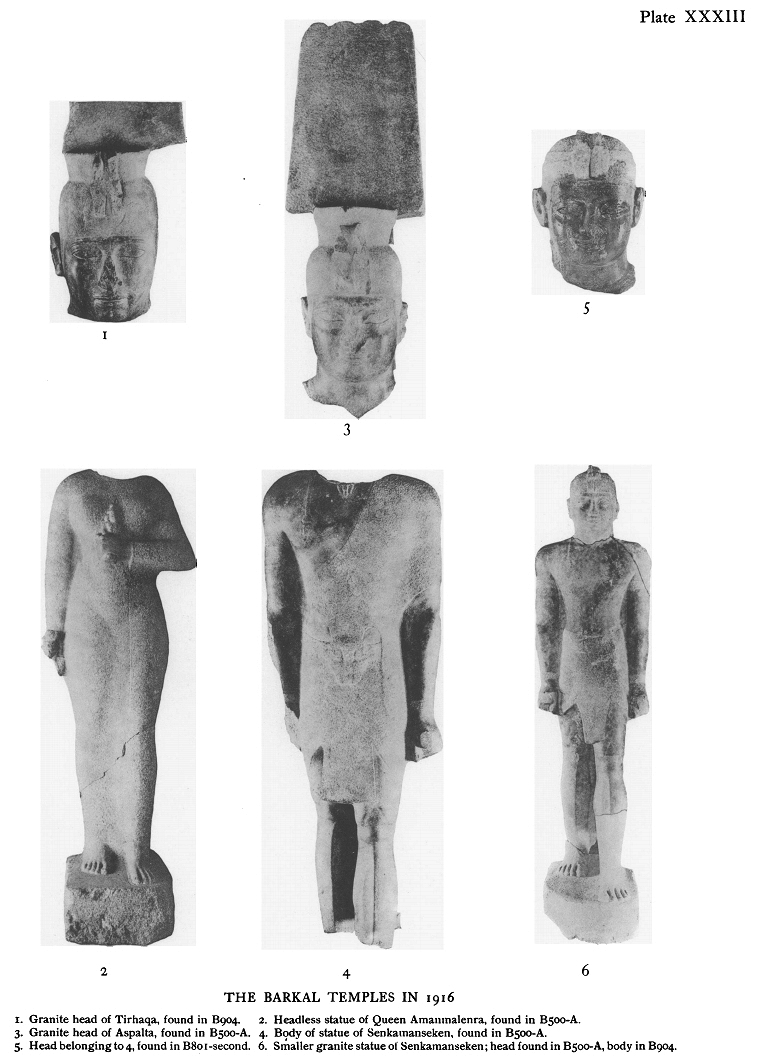
Statues excavated at Jebel Barkal in 1916.

During 1917, Sudanese troops conducted operations against the Lau Nuer. In 1920, British aircraft bombed Garjak Nuer villages near Nasir. On 26 September 1921, followers of Abdallah al-Sihayni attacked the fort at Nyala. Government troops then burned villages and seized livestock in Darfur. In 1922, colonial troops conducted operations in the Nuba Mountains, including at Tira al-Akhdar in November.

Colonial troops mounted further expeditions against Nuba communities during 1923. Operations reached Katla Kurung, Miacoma, and Umbri Koalib hill settlements.

By 1922, King's African Rifles troops controlled much of Didinga territory. Sudanese troops assisted as Uganda established an outpost at Nagichot.

In 1922, government troops attacked Ariathdit's Dinka supporters near Gogrial. Ariathdit surrendered after troops burned his village in March 1922.

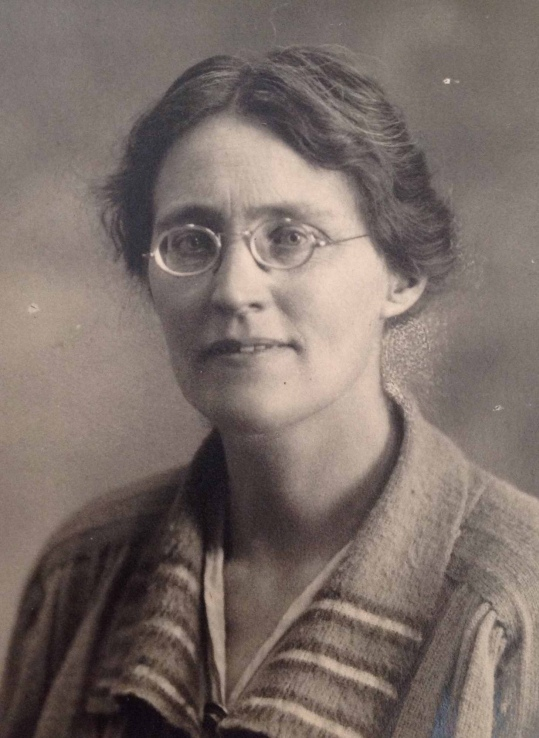
Grace Mary Crowfoot.

From 1916, George Reisner excavated ancient monuments at Jebel Barkal. His discoveries included statues representing rulers of the Kushite kingdom. At El-Kurru, excavations documented royal pyramids and older burial mounds. At Kerma, Reisner excavated ancient royal cemeteries during this period.

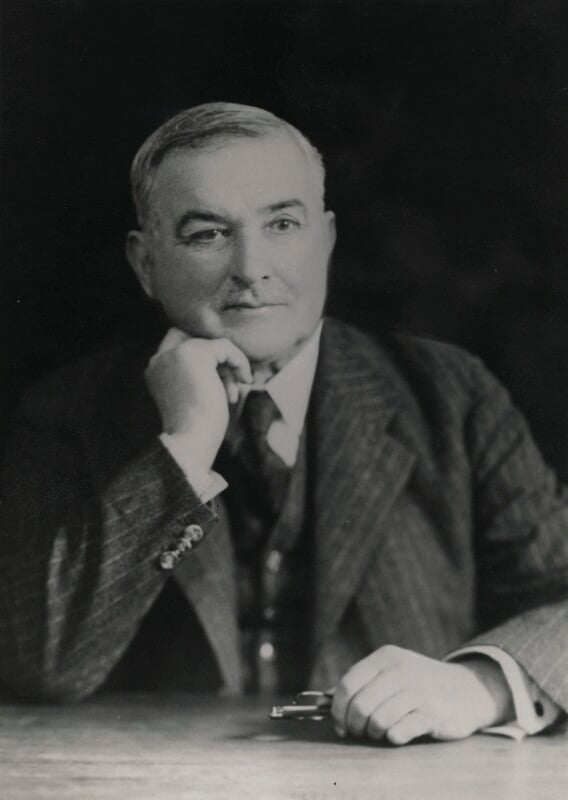
John Brian Christopherson.

In 1918, John Brian Christopherson, director of the civil hospitals of Khartoum and Omdurman, reported the successful use of intravenous injections of antimony potassium tartrate in treating schistosomiasis, a treatment introduced at Khartoum Civil Hospital in May 1917. Despite its efficacy, antimony treatment could cause serious adverse effects.

Khalil Farah began composing patriotic poetry during the 1920s.

Wellcome Research Laboratories report.

In 1921, following the efforts of Grace Mary Crowfoot, the Midwifery Training School opened in Omdurman to train Sudanese midwives. Its founding matron, Mabel E. Wolff, was joined by her sister Gertrude L. Wolff, who had come to Sudan to train nurses.

In 1918, the Jewish community of Khartoum was formally organised, with Joseph Forti elected as its head. The community maintained close religious ties with Egyptian Jewish communities and was served by Rabbi Solomon Malka. In 1919, Greek settlers established a community association in Wad Madani. In 1921, Khartoum's Hellenic Athletic Club, formed in 1913, participated in a local football championship, with matches usually held at Gordon Memorial College. In the Butana, Shukria chiefs recovered grazing rights under the condominium administration, which increasingly relied on traditional chiefs through Native Administration in rural areas.

=== Interwar period (1925–1939) ===
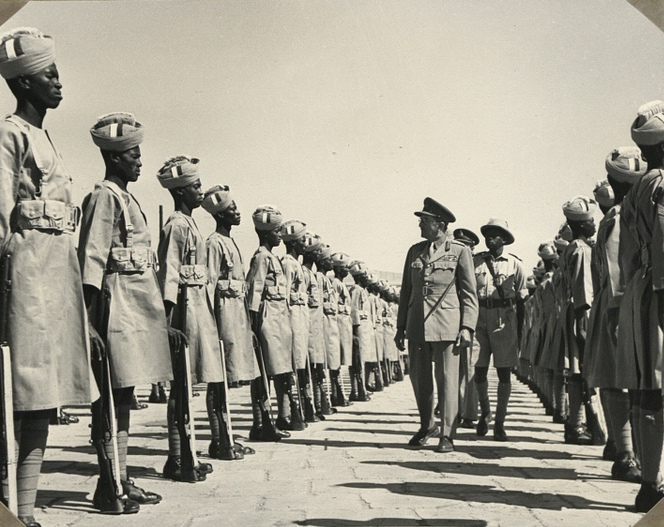
Sudan Defence Force guard of honour.

Following the withdrawal of Egyptian troops in 1924, Britain established the Sudan Defence Force to replace Egyptian-controlled military formations. Geoffrey Archer succeeded Lee Stack as governor-general in January 1925, but was replaced by John Maffey in 1926 following controversy over his visit to Abdul Rahman al-Mahdi on Aba Island. Harold MacMichael became civil secretary in 1926, while Stewart Symes succeeded Maffey as governor-general in 1934. Relations with Egypt changed under the Anglo-Egyptian treaty of 1936, which permitted Egyptian soldiers to return to Sudan after their withdrawal in 1924.

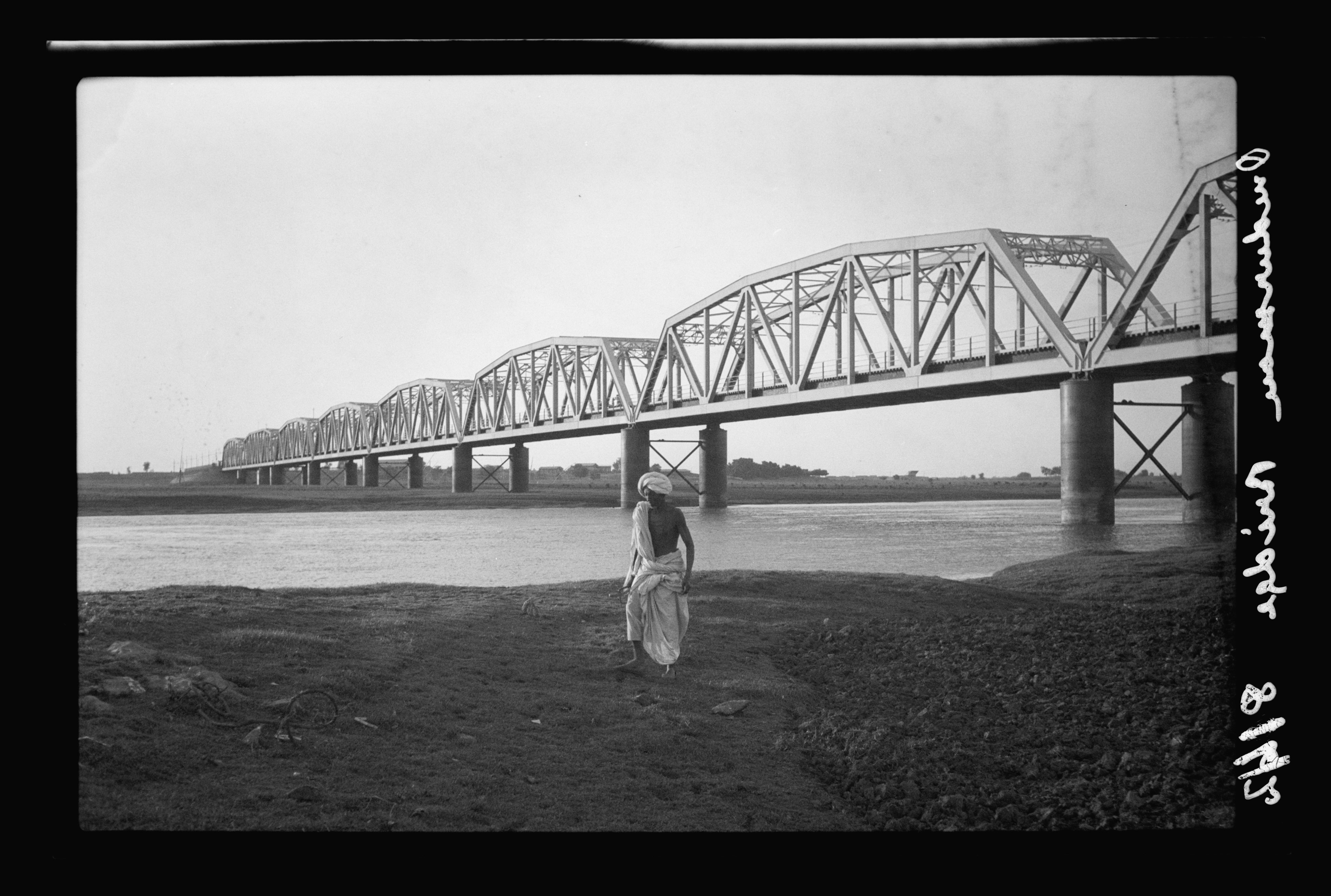
The Omdurman Bridge in 1936.

The Sennar Dam in 1926.

The colonial administration expanded irrigation and transport infrastructure. Construction of Sennar Dam on the Blue Nile was completed in May 1925, after work that had begun in 1914 and was interrupted by the First World War. The dam supplied water to the Gezira Scheme, which expanded irrigated cotton cultivation across central Sudan. The Omdurman Bridge opened across the White Nile in 1926, while the Kassala–Gedarif railway extension was completed in eastern Sudan in 1928. On 7 May 1929, Britain and Egypt concluded an agreement on the use of Nile waters for irrigation. Engineer John Watson Gibson began construction of the Jebel Aulia Dam in 1933, which was completed on the White Nile in 1937.

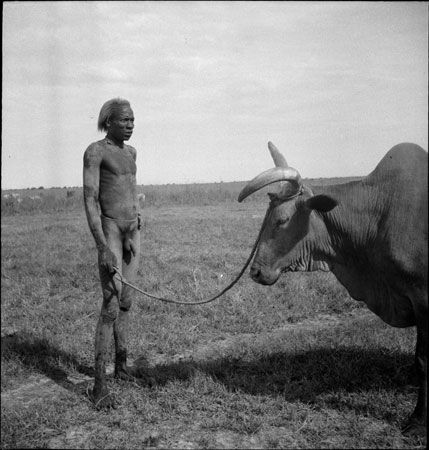
A Nuer man with his oxen in 1936.

Counterinsurgency operations continued in southern Sudan, particularly against Nuer insurgents. On 14 December 1927, Nuer fighters killed district commissioner Vere Fergusson near Lake Jorr. Sudanese mounted patrols operated against Gaawar Nuer communities during 1928. In November 1928, British aircraft bombed the Ngundeng Pyramid, a sacred site built by the Nuer prophet Ngundeng Bong. After the bombs failed to destroy it, ground forces used explosives that damaged the monument. Percy Coriat participated in operations against the Nuer during 1928–1929, which culminated in the death of the prophet Guek Ngundeng, son of Ngundeng Bong, in a confrontation with government troops in 1929. Counterinsurgency also extended to other communities. In December 1929, British aircraft bombed a position held by members of a Nuba community in Kordofan, while British authorities recorded renewed Gaawar Nuer unrest during operations in 1930. RAF aircraft conducted operations involving Anuak frontier communities in 1931. In March 1932, Anuak raiders attacked Murle settlements and captured 80 women and children. In 1936, the Sudan Defence Force established a frontier post on the Boma Plateau, while British aircraft conducted operations in the Anuak–Murle borderlands in May 1937.

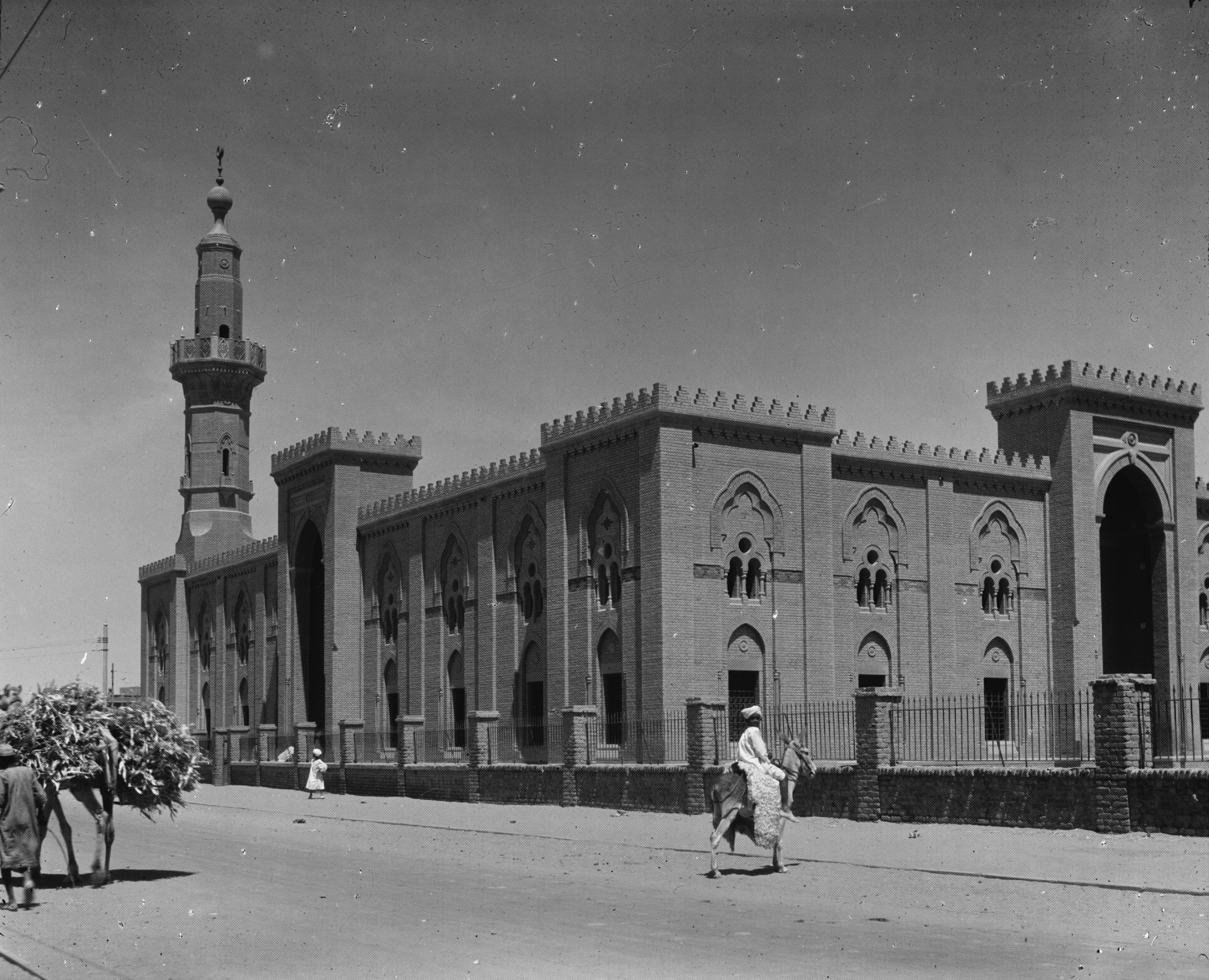
Omdurman’s main mosque, c. 1936.

British colonial policies also reshaped rural and southern administration. A 1930 directive associated with the Southern Policy sought to restrict northern influence in southern Sudan, while the 1932 Native Courts Ordinance formalised customary courts under native administration.

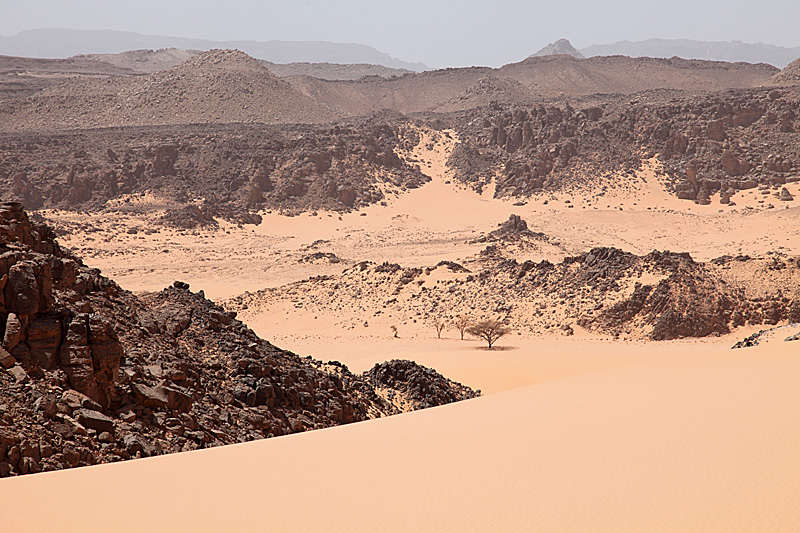
Jebel Uweinat near the Sudanese frontier.

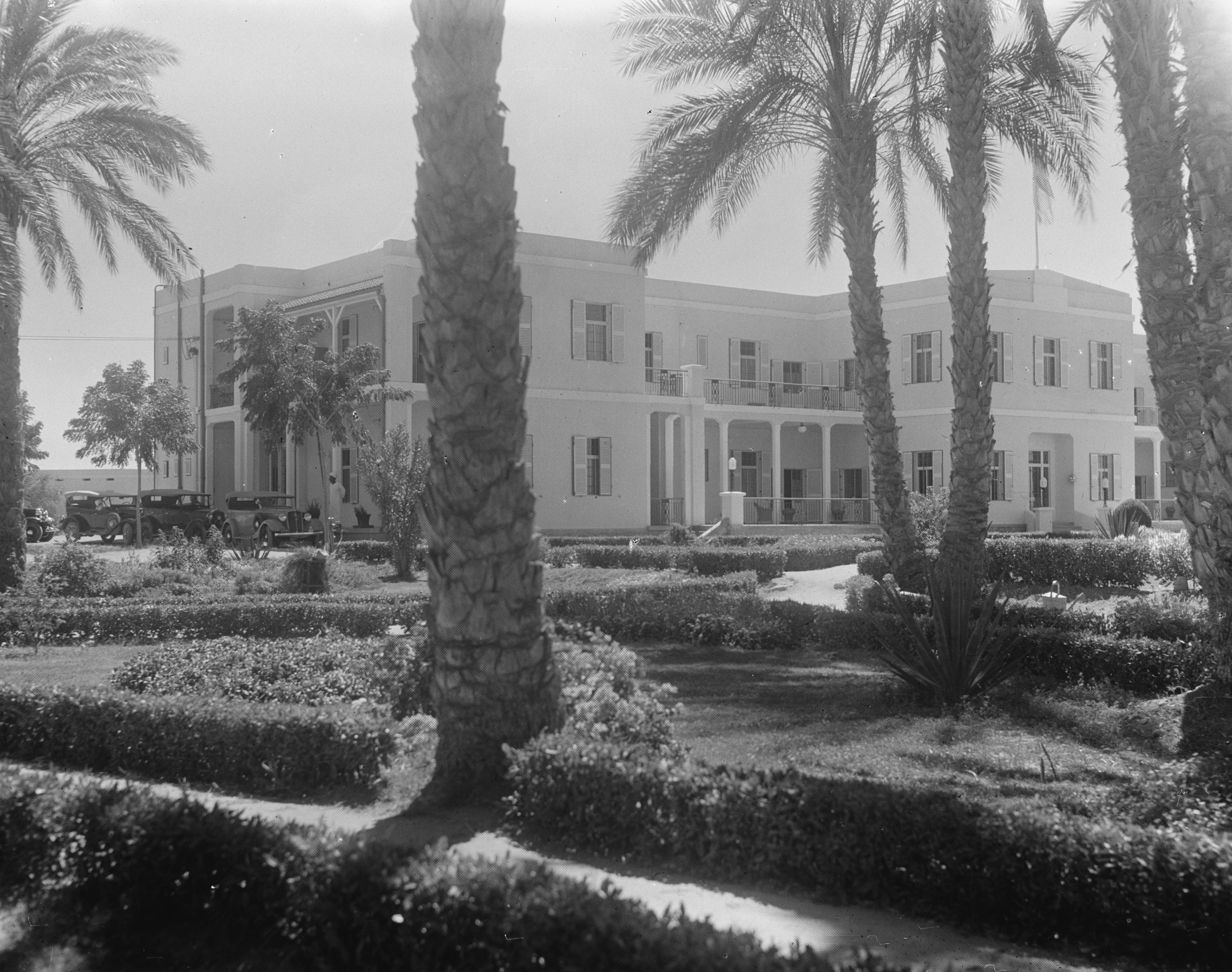
A railway hotel in Wadi Halfa, c. 1936.

Frontier security became another concern. In 1933, Sudanese mounted infantry reinforced posts near Ethiopia's frontier, while Italian patrols challenged frontier positions near Jebel Uweinat. In January 1934, RAF personnel established a post at Karkur Murr near Jebel Uweinat, followed by Sudan Defence Force troops in February. Britain transferred the Sarra Triangle to Italian Libya in 1934. Italy's invasion of Ethiopia in 1935 increased tensions and strengthened eastern and southern border defences.

An aircraft refuelling at Khartoum in 1936.

Education and the press contributed to the growth of Sudanese cultural and political activity. Unity High School for Girls opened in Khartoum in 1928 as the successor to an earlier girls' school, while Sudanese graduates launched the cultural journal al-Nahda in 1931. Students at Gordon Memorial College struck against reduced graduate salaries in 1931. The literary magazine al-Fajr began publishing Sudanese short stories in 1934, followed by the Arabic newspaper al-Nil, founded by Abd al-Rahman al-Mahdi in 1935. Political organisation among educated Sudanese also developed through the Graduates' General Congress, established on 12 February 1938 to seek greater political representation, with Ismail al-Azhari among its leading members.

Organised football also expanded in Omdurman. Al-Merrikh adopted its current name in November 1927, followed by the foundation of Al-Hilal in February 1930. The establishment of the Sudan Football Association in 1936 provided a national body to organise competitions. The Greek community also contributed to commerce, while ties to Greek political leaders helped establish an air connection between Sudan and Greece in the early 1930s.

=== World War II (1939–1945) ===
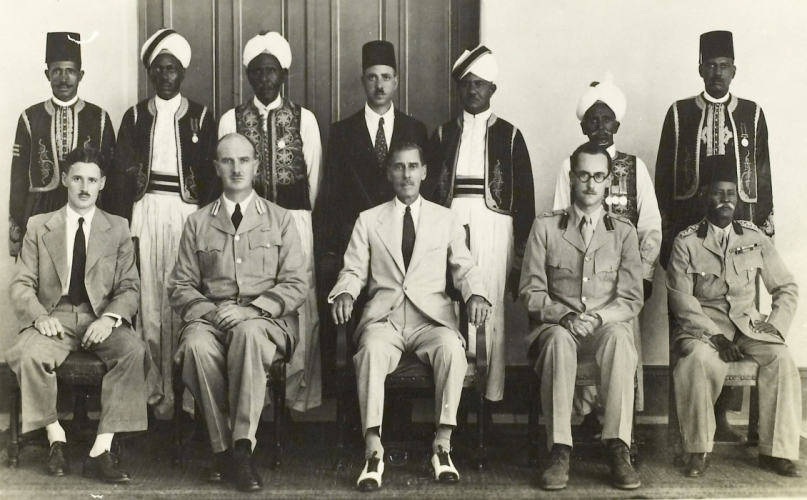
Governor-General Stewart Symes with his staff at Khartoum, c. 1940.

Following the outbreak of World War II in September 1939, the Sudan Defence Force (SDF) had little to do other than preparations should the land war reach Africa. Originally established in 1925 as a formation of the British Colonial Auxiliary Forces, the SDF had operated largely as a militia-like gendarmerie, responsible for internal security, assisting local police, maintaining order and suppressing local unrest.

Mahommed Yahja of the Sudan Defence Force Western Arab Corps, portrayed at Omdurman.

Organised into the Camel Corps, Eastern Arab Corps, Western Arab Corps and Equatoria Corps, its Sudanese troops served under British and Sudanese officers, supported by artillery, engineers, machine-gun units, signals and transport services. Following the Italian conquest of Ethiopia in 1936, the force underwent reorganisation and training to fight a military opponent. Five companies were mechanised, with lorries carrying light machine guns, while locally improvised armoured cars were built using Ford trucks. The force also possessed mortars, while the Sudan Horse was being converted into an artillery battery equipped with 3.7-inch mountain howitzers. By June 1940, the SDF comprised 21 companies, including five motor machine-gun companies, totalling approximately 4,500 men.

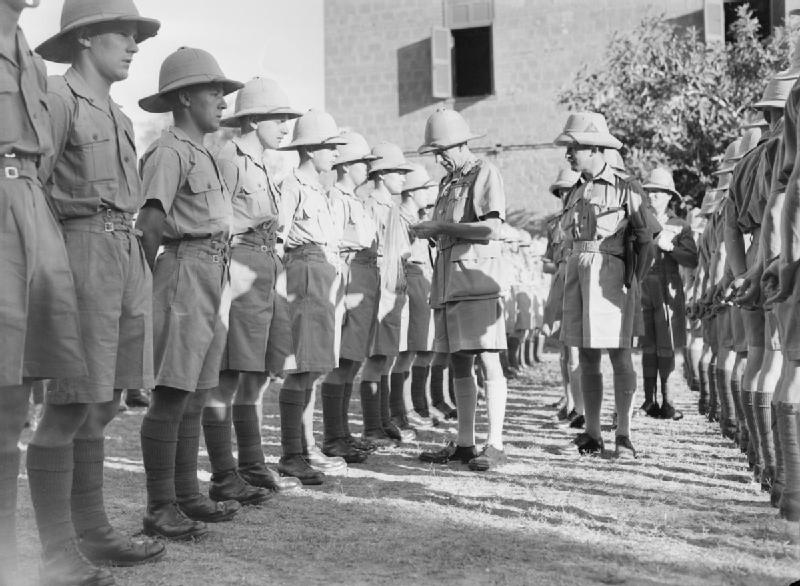
Major-General William Platt inspecting reinforcements in Sudan.

Major-General William Platt commanded the forces defending the territory. Alongside the SDF, British regular infantry battalions guarded the principal towns and transport centres, while Sudanese troops, provincial police and irregular scouts defended the frontier. From 10 June 1940, when Fascist Italy declared war on Britain and France, Sudan faced attacks from forces based in Italian East Africa. On 4 July, Italian forces launched a limited offensive to capture Sudanese settlements near the border, including Kassala. The town had a garrison of around 500 men of the SDF and local police, and no artillery or armoured vehicles. Despite being outnumbered, the defenders mounted a spirited defence before retreating, having inflicted far more casualties than they sustained. Italian troops also occupied the small fort at Gallabat, and the villages of Ghezzan, Kurmuk and Dumbode on the Blue Nile.

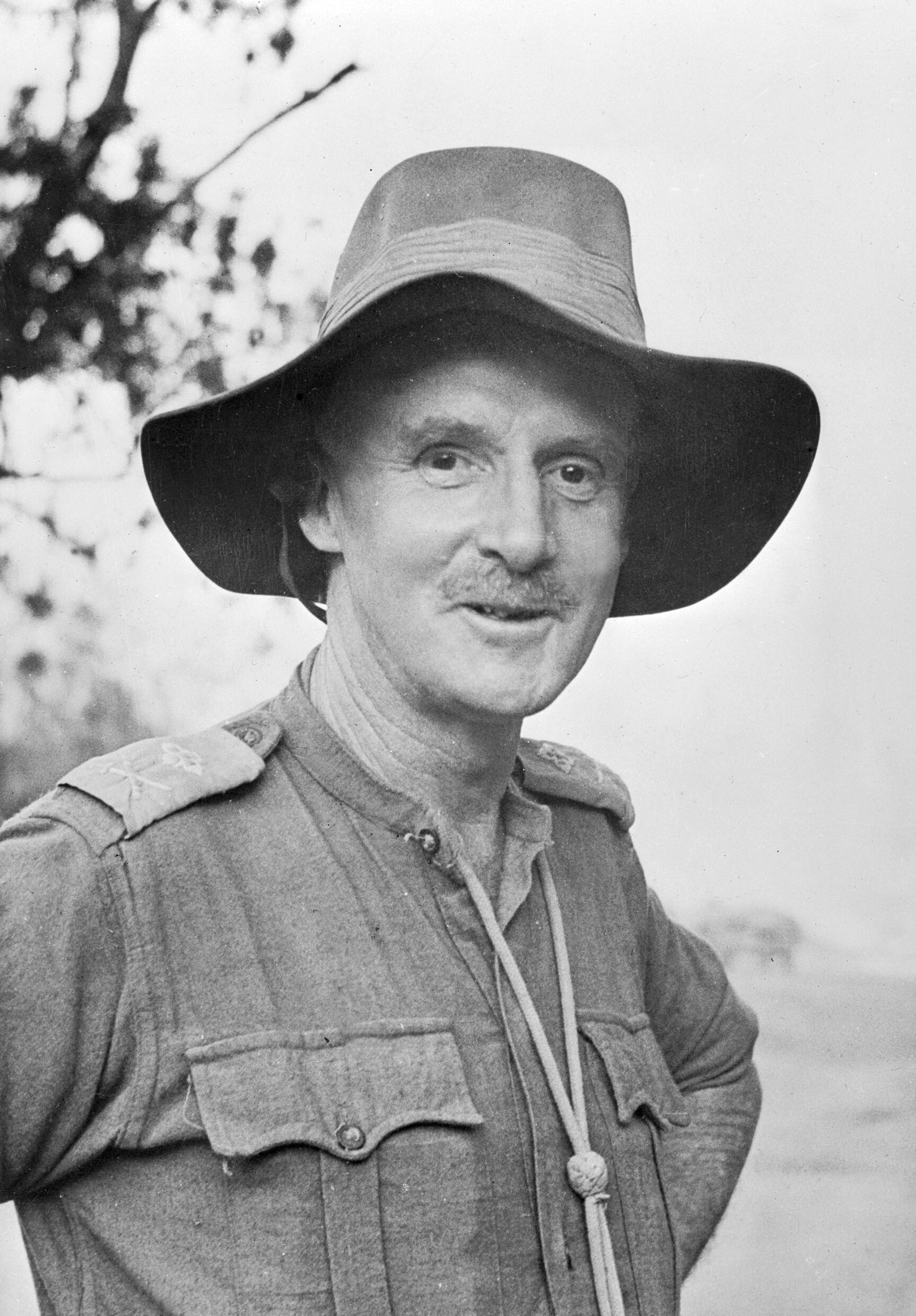
Frank Messervy, commander of Gazelle Force in 1940.

Sudanese motorised units continued patrolling and harassing the Italians around Kassala.

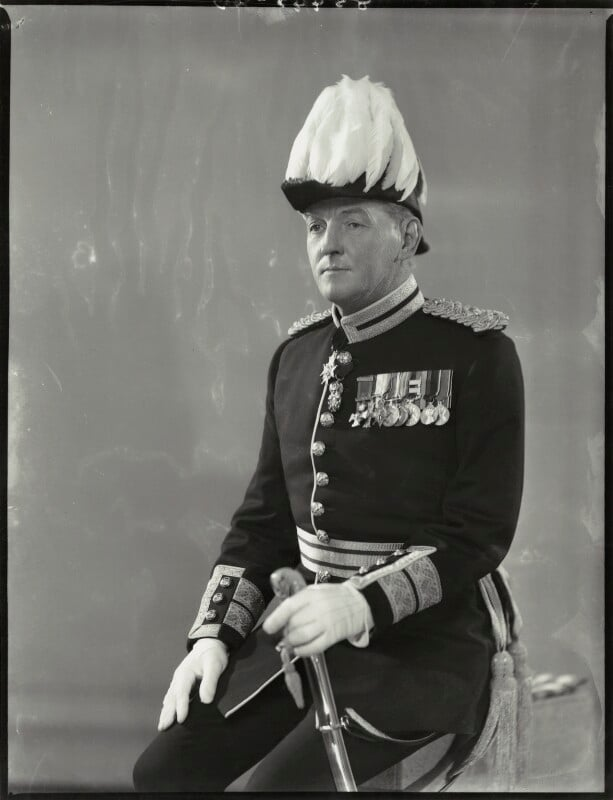
Major-General Lewis Heath in 1939.

From September 1940, Platt began receiving substantial reinforcements, with the arrival of the 5th Indian Infantry Division under Major-General Lewis Heath, tanks and artillery. On 16 October, Gazelle Force, a motorised reconnaissance and raiding unit, was formed from Sudanese and Indian units under Colonel Frank Messervy. It included three SDF motor machine-gun companies operating lorries with mounted machine guns, alongside Indian troops and supporting artillery. During 1940, the force was focused on raiding around Kassala, particularly to the north of the town and east of the Gash River.

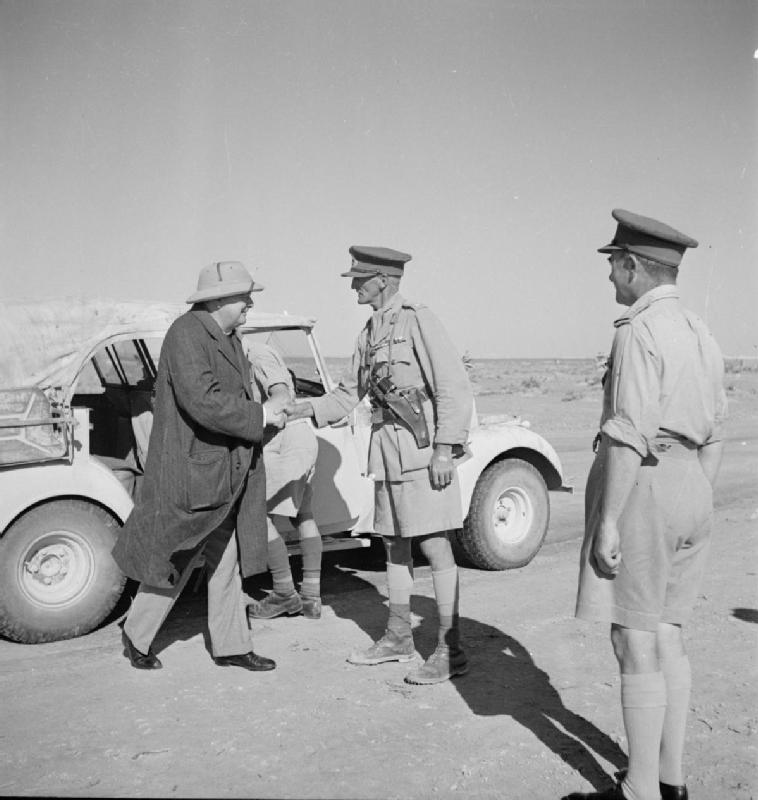
William Ramsden meeting Winston Churchill near El Alamein in 1942.

The war accelerated the transformation of the SDF from a lightly equipped colonial auxiliary into a larger fighting force. Additional Sudanese troops were recruited and trained, while motorised companies received machine guns, lorries and armoured vehicles. In January 1941, SDF units participated in the British advance into Italian Eritrea, contributing machine-gun companies, artillery and locally constructed armoured cars. Other Sudanese formations served with Gideon Force under Orde Wingate during operations in Ethiopia, while additional units operated along the Libyan frontier and in the Western Desert campaign. The force expanded throughout the war under later commandants Balfour Hutchison and William Ramsden, eventually reaching approximately 20,000 men.

Smoke rising from Gallabat fort, November 1940.

On 6 November 1940, the 10th Indian Infantry Brigade, supported by artillery and tanks of the 6th Royal Tank Regiment, attacked the Italian-held fort at Gallabat under Brigadier William Slim.

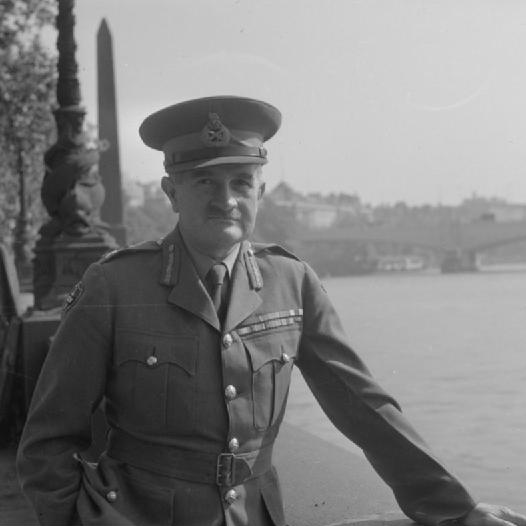
William Slim, who commanded the 1940 attack on Gallabat, photographed in 1945.

The Garhwal Rifles reached the fort and fought hand-to-hand with Italian and Eritrean troops, capturing the position despite resistance. Italian bombers and fighters attacked throughout the day, while mines, mechanical failures and the rocky ground disabled most of the British tanks. Unable to hold their positions against the Italian counterattack, the brigade withdrew to a ridge west of Gallabat. Following the reverse at Gallabat, Archibald Wavell reviewed the situation in December and ordered the 4th Indian Infantry Division under Major-General Noel Beresford-Peirse to be transferred from Egypt to Sudan. British forces continued patrols and raids along the frontier in preparation for an offensive against Italian East Africa.

Map of the Battle of Keren, 1941.

Italian forces began withdrawing from Kassala in January 1941 as British reinforcements and the success of Operation Compass increased the threat to their positions. The Italians abandoned the town on 18 January, and British Indian troops entered the following day. Major-General William Platt was ordered to mount a vigorous pursuit, bringing forward the invasion of Italian Eritrea. The Sudan Defence Force, Gazelle Force and the 4th and 5th Indian Infantry Divisions participated in the advance. The Battle of Agordat was fought from 26 to 31 January, with determined fighting on the hills around the town. Indian infantry supported by Matilda tanks broke through the Italian defences, forcing the defenders to retreat towards Keren. Agordat was occupied on 1 February, while the Italian garrison at Barentu withdrew the following day. A Sudan Defence Force machine-gun company found a track that enabled it to outflank the defenders and attack from the east.

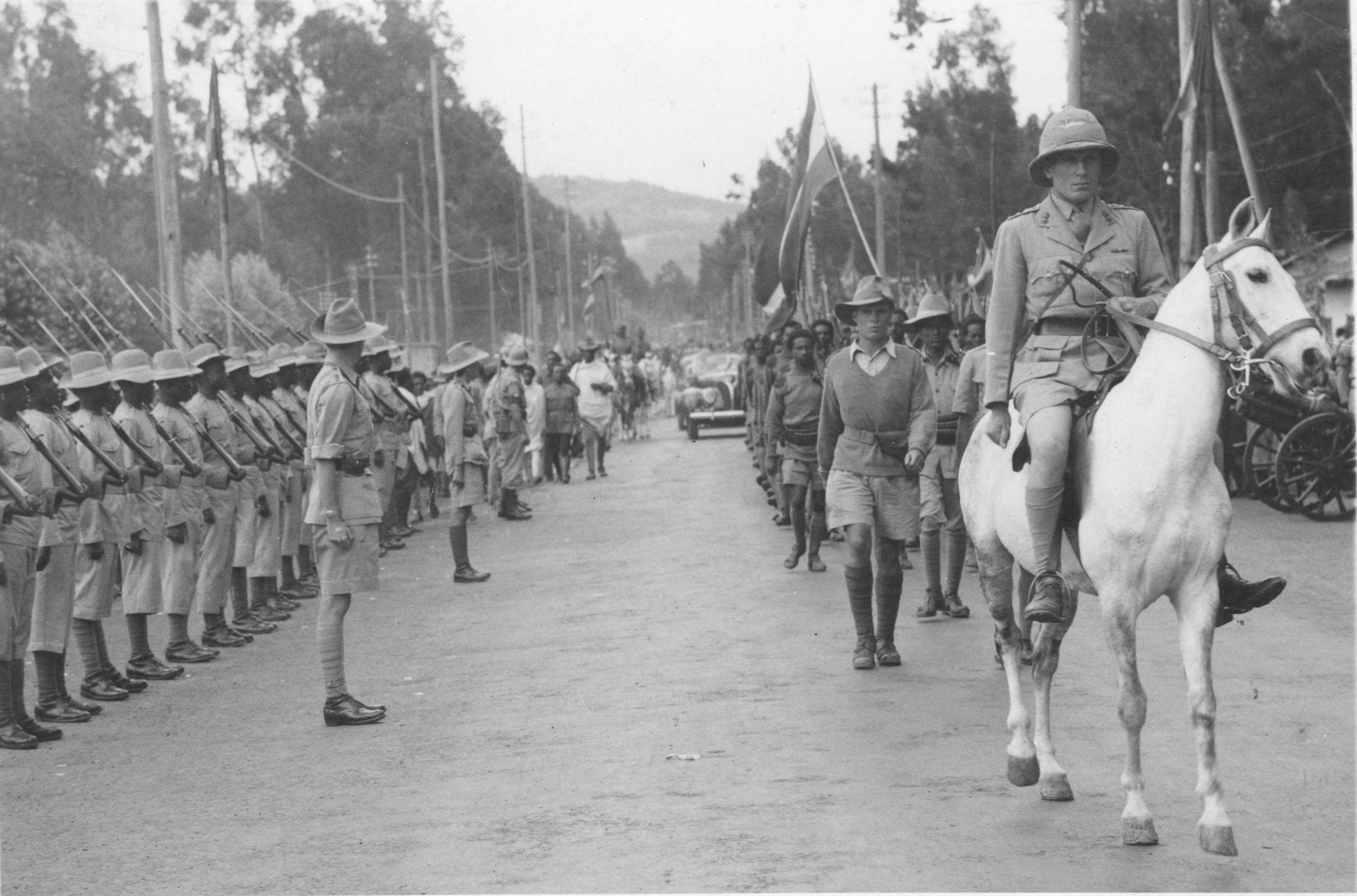
Orde Wingate in Ethiopia during the 1941 campaign.

Meanwhile, Haile Selassie, who had been in exile, crossed from Sudan into Ethiopia in January 1941 to support resistance against Italian occupation. The British had already organised Mission 101 under Colonel Daniel Sandford to coordinate the activities of the Ethiopian resistance in Gojjam, supported by Sudanese and Ethiopian troops. In February, the Frontier Battalion of the Sudan Defence Force, the 2nd Ethiopian Battalion and two operational centres were organised into Gideon Force under Major Orde Wingate. Working alongside the Ethiopian Arbegnoch, the force sought to isolate Italian garrisons along the roads connecting Gondar, Bure and Debre Marqos. During February and March, Sudanese soldiers carried out guerrilla raids against Italian positions, attacked isolated forts and disrupted communications. Parties of about fifty men approached enemy posts at night and attacked with grenades and bayonets. By March, Gideon Force had driven Italian troops from Bure and advanced towards Debre Marqos.

Machine gunners in Eritrea, photographed for the British Colonial Office (date unspecified).

Sudanese troops fought at Keren alongside Brigadier Harold Rawdon Briggs's Briggsforce, opening access to Asmara.In February, mobile Gazelle Force dissolved amid difficult mountainous fighting. Allied troops captured Keren on 27 March after prolonged fighting. Eritrea's capital Asmara fell to Allied troops on 1 April. On 8 April, Italian defenders surrendered Massawa's strategic seaport unconditionally. In May, Platt's SDF forces defeated Italian resistance at Amba Alagi.

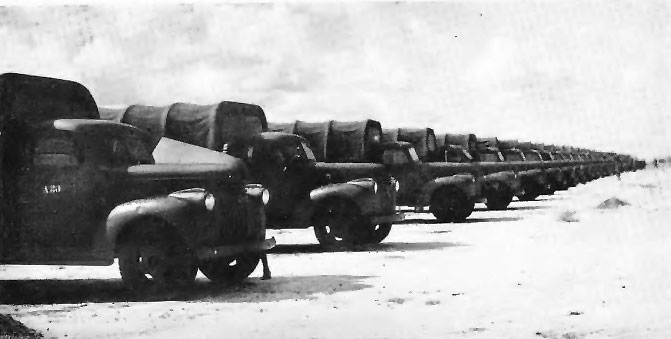
Belgian military trucks at Malakal during the East African campaign, 1941.

During the War, southern Sudan experienced Italian air raids, frontier fighting, and local violence. In July 1940, Italian aircraft bombed Malakal, burning several huts. On 23 August, an attack on the Doro mission killed two American missionaries and wounded others. Italian authorities admitted bombing Daga River Post, but denied responsibility for Doro. Sudanese police and Anuak scouts fought Italian forces along the Ethiopian frontier, including operations around Tirgol, Kwanyet, and Pochalla in 1940–1941. Farther south, twelve Kuku hunters were killed near the Uganda border in 1943. Authorities executed a Ma'di man, deepening tensions between the neighbouring communities.

Onbashi Mansour Abdel Gadir, a Sudan Defence Force engineer soldier, depicted at Omdurman.

In 1943, ten Isoke students struck at Palotaka Teachers Training School. During wartime, southern chiefs conscripted workers for military transport roads.Juba needed approximately 1,500 conscripted labourers for military cargo handling. By 1941, Juba's male population increased substantially through wartime labour. Shilluk-language radio broadcast wartime information services across southern Sudan.

Abdullahi Ismail at the Northern Training Depot in Omdurman, depicted during the Second World War.

The first government girls' intermediate school opened in Omdurman, 1940. By 1942, Sudan's government operated sixty-one girls' elementary schools nationwide. In 1941, Elaine Hills-Young opened Omdurman's government child welfare centre. Six nurse-midwives received health visitor training at Omdurman during 1942. In 1943, Omdurman radio broadcasts explained Sudanese midwives' professional training.A Red Cross appeal sought donations from Sudanese listeners. In 1945, several higher schools merged into Gordon Memorial College. In November 1941, Atbara factory workers staged a labour strike. In January 1942, construction workers organised a strike in Kassala. During November 1942, workers struck in Juba.

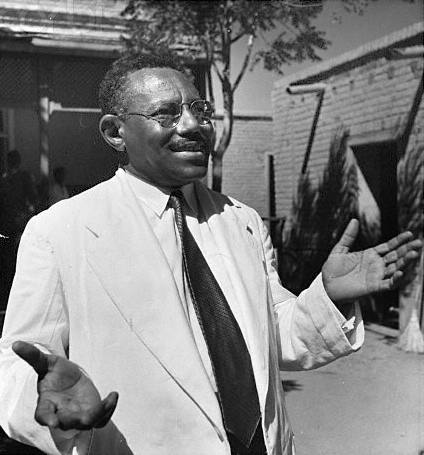
Ismail al-Azhari, a leader of the unionist movement.

In 1942, the Graduates' General Congress demanded a pledge of self-determination after the war, but Governor-General Hubert Huddleston refused its memorandum. Although intended to widen Sudanese participation, the Advisory Council for Northern Sudan was established in 1943 and inaugurated in May 1944, apart from the southern provinces. Meanwhile, Ismail al-Azhari and his supporters formed the Ashigga party in 1943, seeking to end the condominium by union with Egypt. the Umma Party, established in February 1945 with the backing of Abdul Rahman al-Mahdi, sought to end the condominium through absolute independence from both Britain and Egypt.

RAF ground crew preparing a Vickers Wellesley bomber at Kassala during the East African campaign.

At Wadi Seidna, an American airfield was constructed for wartime operations, and the United States Army Air Forces established the 46th Ferrying Squadron there in December 1942. The RAF established a transport wing in May 1944. School buildings at Wadi Seidna, begun in 1938, were used for military purposes during the war, delaying their occupation by secondary students until 1946.

A Sudan Defence Force soldier, portrayed during the Second World War.

In April 1940, British authorities established Radio Omdurman to broadcast Allied war news. Initially operating from the old post office, it moved to rented premises in 1942, then expanded its broadcasts. Meanwhile, a photographic department was established within the colonial Public Relations Office in 1940. Although intended to influence wartime audiences, the administration also employed mobile cinemas on vans and the Sudan Railways' Public Enlightenment Car, bringing films to provincial towns. Through these travelling screenings, Desert Victory (1943) and Partners in Victory, a documentary about the Sudan Defence Force in North Africa, were shown to large audiences across Sudan.

Mahommed Khalafalla of the recruits' unit at Omdurman, portrayed during the Second World War.

Meanwhile, education continued expanding, with the School of Arts opening at Gordon Memorial College in 1940, followed by the establishment of its first student union in 1941. In 1943, the Department of Arts at Bakht al-Ruda was incorporated into the college's Institute of Education. By 1945, the School of Design had been established in Khartoum, providing training in painting, architecture, carpentry and design to prepare art teachers for Sudanese schools.

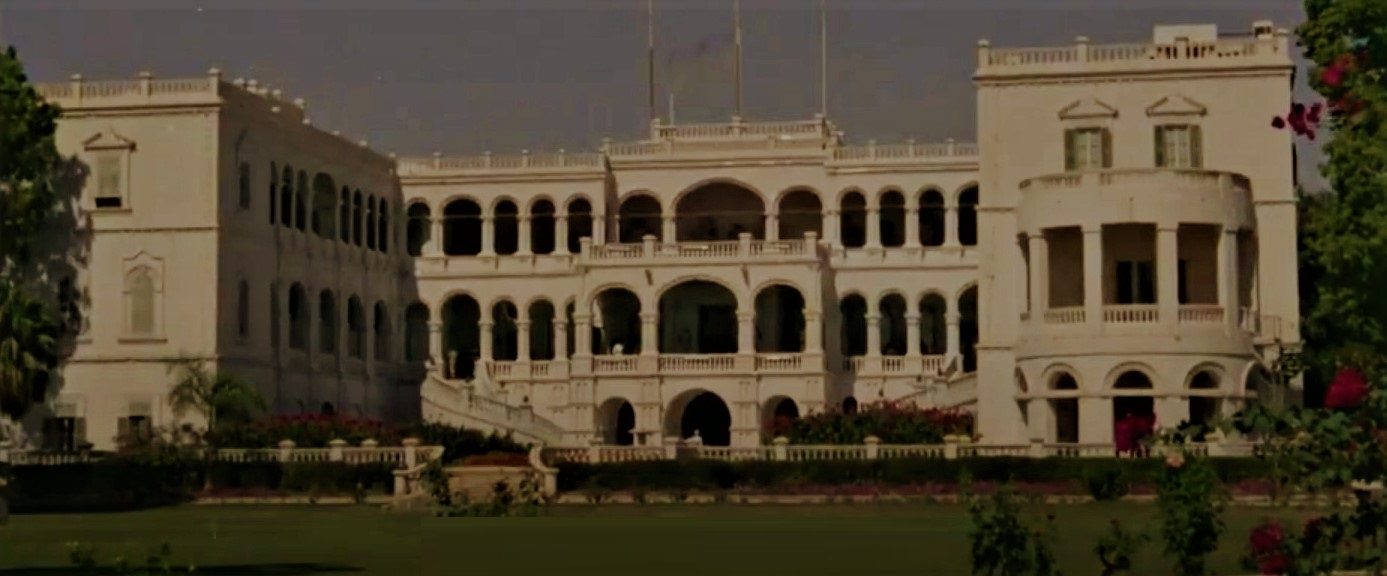
The Governor-General's Palace in Khartoum, photographed in 1940.

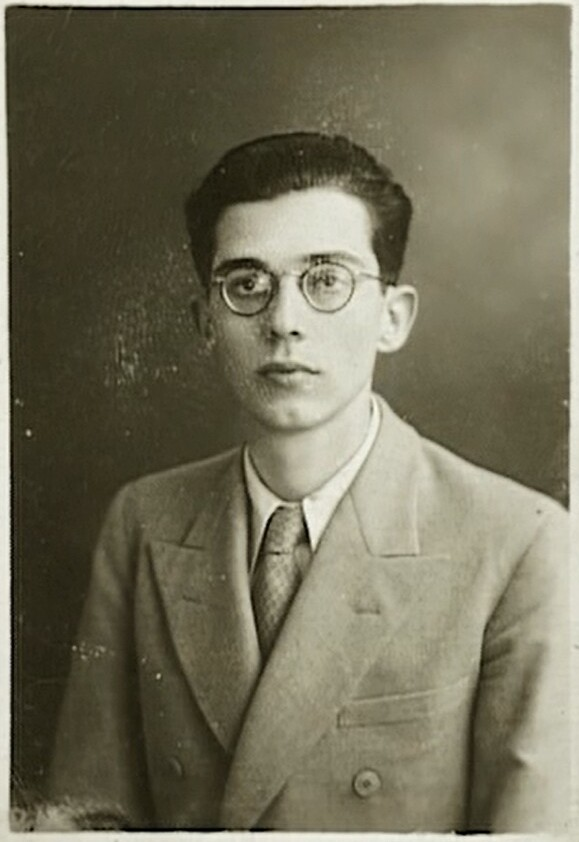
Henri Curiel as a young student.

In 1944, British authorities established the Advisory Council for Northern Sudan, dominated by appointed provincial chiefs and religious notables, while the southern provinces remained separately administered by the closed doors of the Southern Policy. Its membership consisted of approximately 60% tribal and religious notables, 22% merchants and 18% educated bureaucrats, while the governor-general retained its presidency. According to historian Ahmed Ibrahim Abushouk, the administration intended to unite traditional leaders and moderate graduates against the growing anti-British nationalist movement, while exploiting the Ansar–Khatmiyya rivalry to limit Egyptian influence. Despite advocating Unification of Egypt and Sudan, the Ashiqqa opposed the council's northern jurisdiction, fearing the separation of southern Sudan, while also rejecting its limited powers and Mahdist-dominated membership. Ali al-Mirghani consequently declined honorary membership, citing inadequate representation. Conversely, al-Mahdi's supporters welcomed the British-appointed council as a step towards self-government.

The dispute intensified the rivalry, turning the November 1944 Graduates' General Congress elections into a contest between the two religious movements. The Ashiqqa–Mirghani alliance won a sweeping victory over the Mahdists. The defeat contributed to the establishment of the National Umma Party in February 1945.

Meanwhile, a separate communist movement emerged among Sudanese students in Cairo, where Henri Curiel recruited members into Egyptian communist circles in 1944. Their journal Omdurman began publication on 15 March 1945, providing a platform for political commentary and communist ideas. Its members subsequently established contacts with communists in Khartoum, and on 10 August the two groups agreed to form a united organisation, laying the foundations of the Sudanese Communist Party.

=== Postwar developments and independence (1946–1956) ===
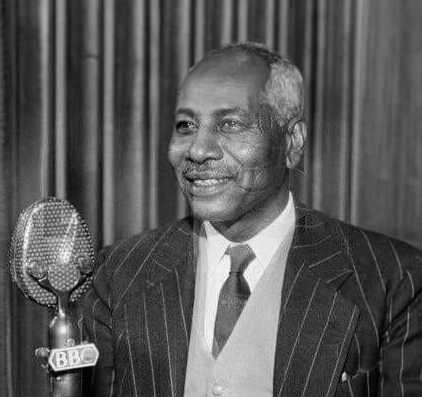
Muhammad Ahmad Abu Rannat, photographed in 1960.

In 1946, Britain reversed its Southern Policy, proposing closer administrative integration between northern and southern Sudan. Southern leaders had not been consulted before this decision, which raised concerns about their future political position. Communist groups united as the Sudanese Movement for National Liberation, operating clandestinely and participating in nationalist politics. In September 1946, Mahmoud Mohammed Taha led protests in Rufaa after a woman's arrest for circumcising her daughter. After the protests, Taha received a two-year prison sentence from Muhammad Ahmad Abu Rannat in Wad Madani. At the Juba Conference in June 1947, British officials discussed the proposed integration with northern and southern representatives.

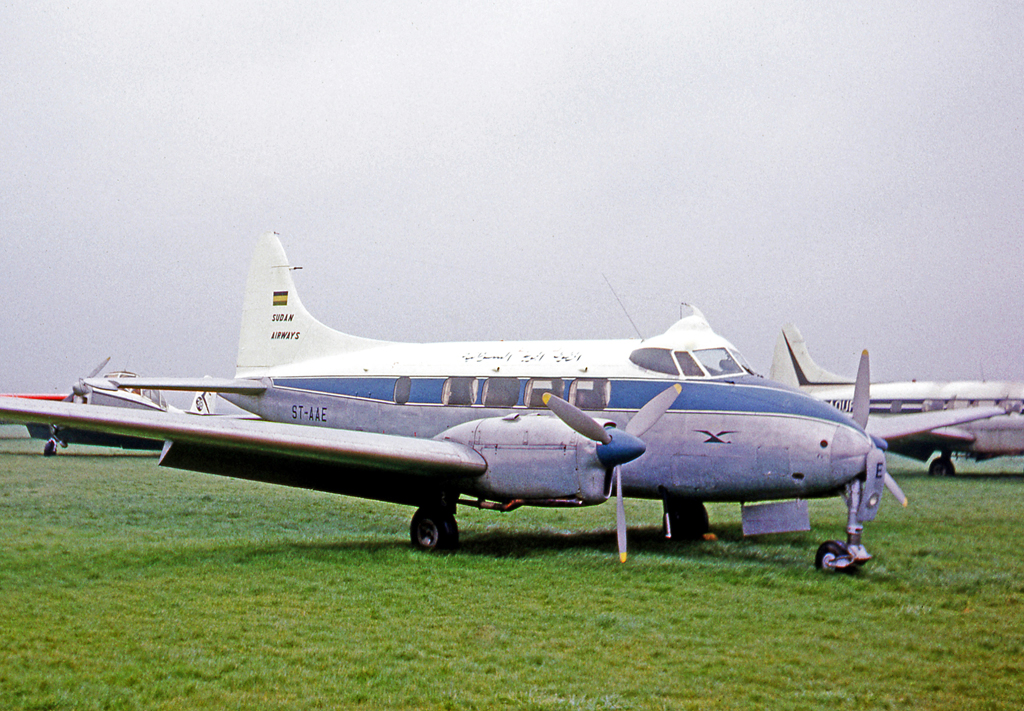
A Sudan Airways Dove.

Cotton farming in the Gezira Scheme

In 1946, railway employees formed the Workers' Affairs Association, laying foundations for Sudan's organised trade-union movement. Sudan Airways began scheduled services in July 1947, connecting Khartoum with Juba, El Fasher, Kassala and Port Sudan. In 1950, the Workers' Congress became the Sudanese Workers' Trade Union Federation, closely associated with the communists. The Sudan Gezira Board assumed management of the Gezira Scheme from its private operators that year. In June 1951, troops disarmed striking Khartoum policemen, followed by dismissals and improvements to police housing.

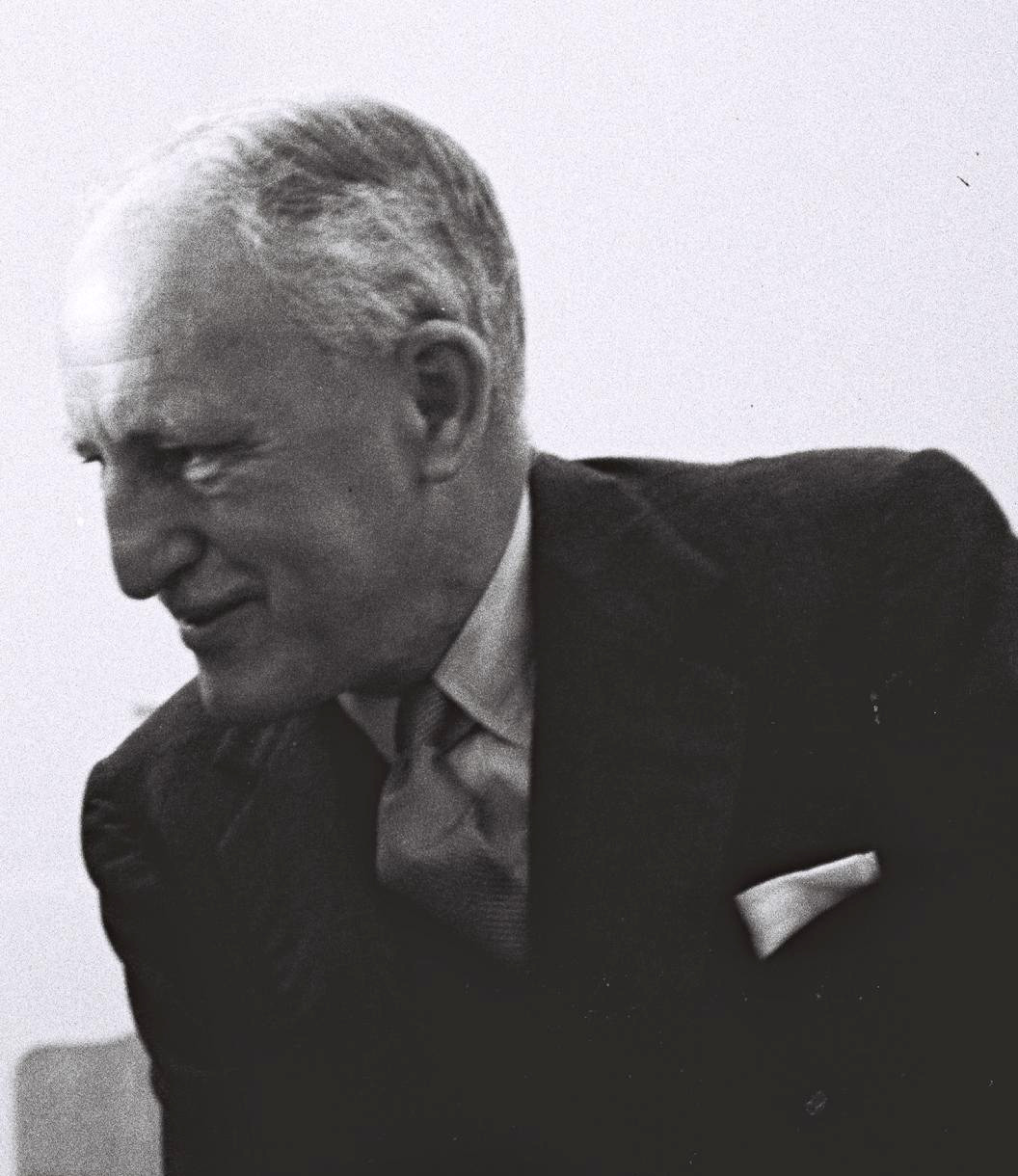
Sir Knox Helm, last British governor-general of Sudan.

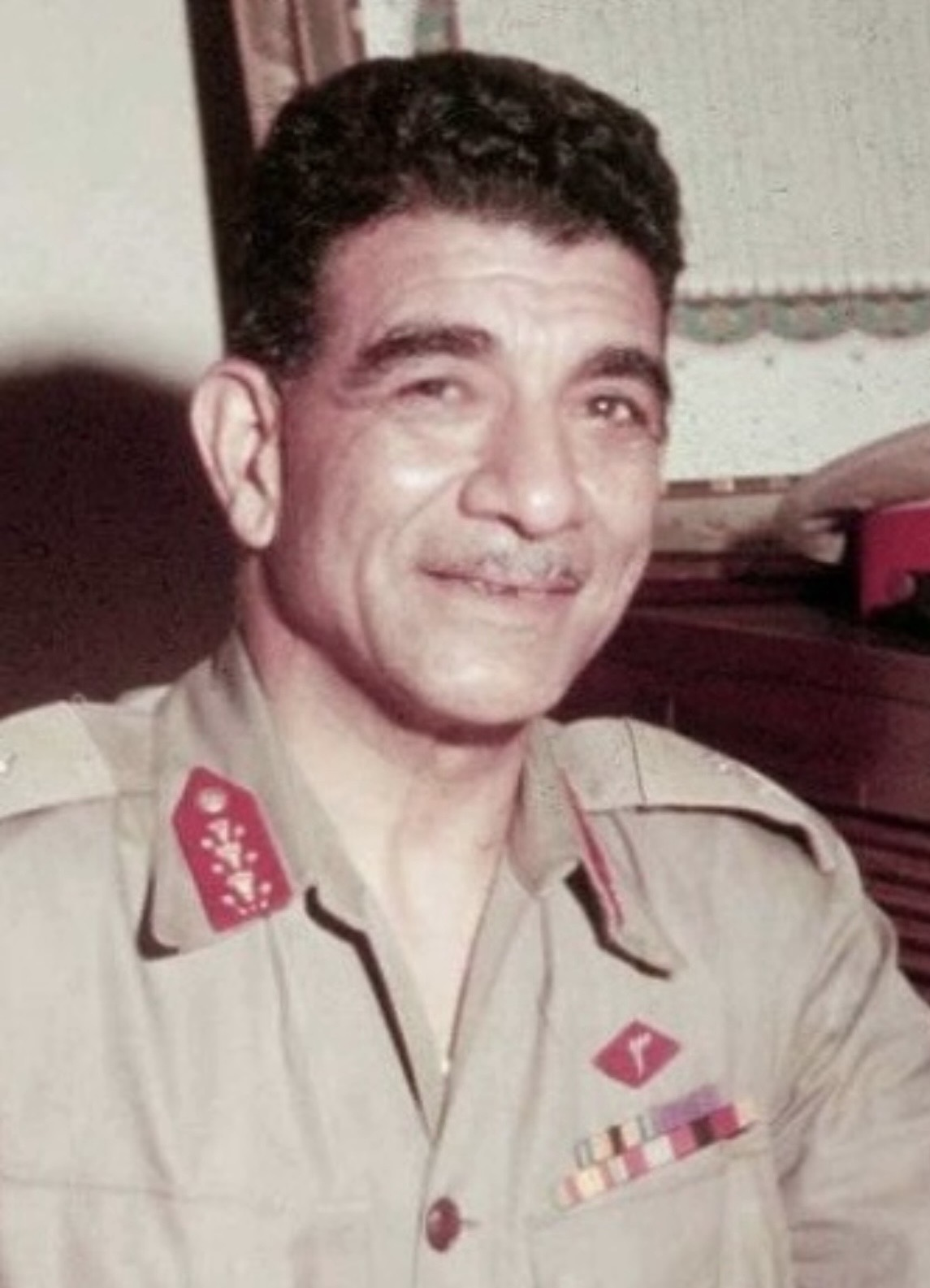
Egyptian leader Muhammad Naguib, 1953.

On 12 February 1953, Britain and Egypt signed an agreement providing for Sudanese self-government followed by self-determination. An international electoral commission was established to supervise preparations and voting, with an Indian chairman and Sudanese representatives. Constitutional arrangements reserved at least two cabinet positions for southerners within the new system of parliamentary government. The constitutional arrangements also allocated approximately one-quarter of parliamentary seats to southern representatives, alongside the cabinet guarantees. In January 1954, al-Azhari became prime minister, leading Sudan's first government under the new self-government arrangements. The Sudanisation Committee, appointed on 20 February 1954, oversaw replacing foreign personnel in the administration, police and Sudan Defence Force.

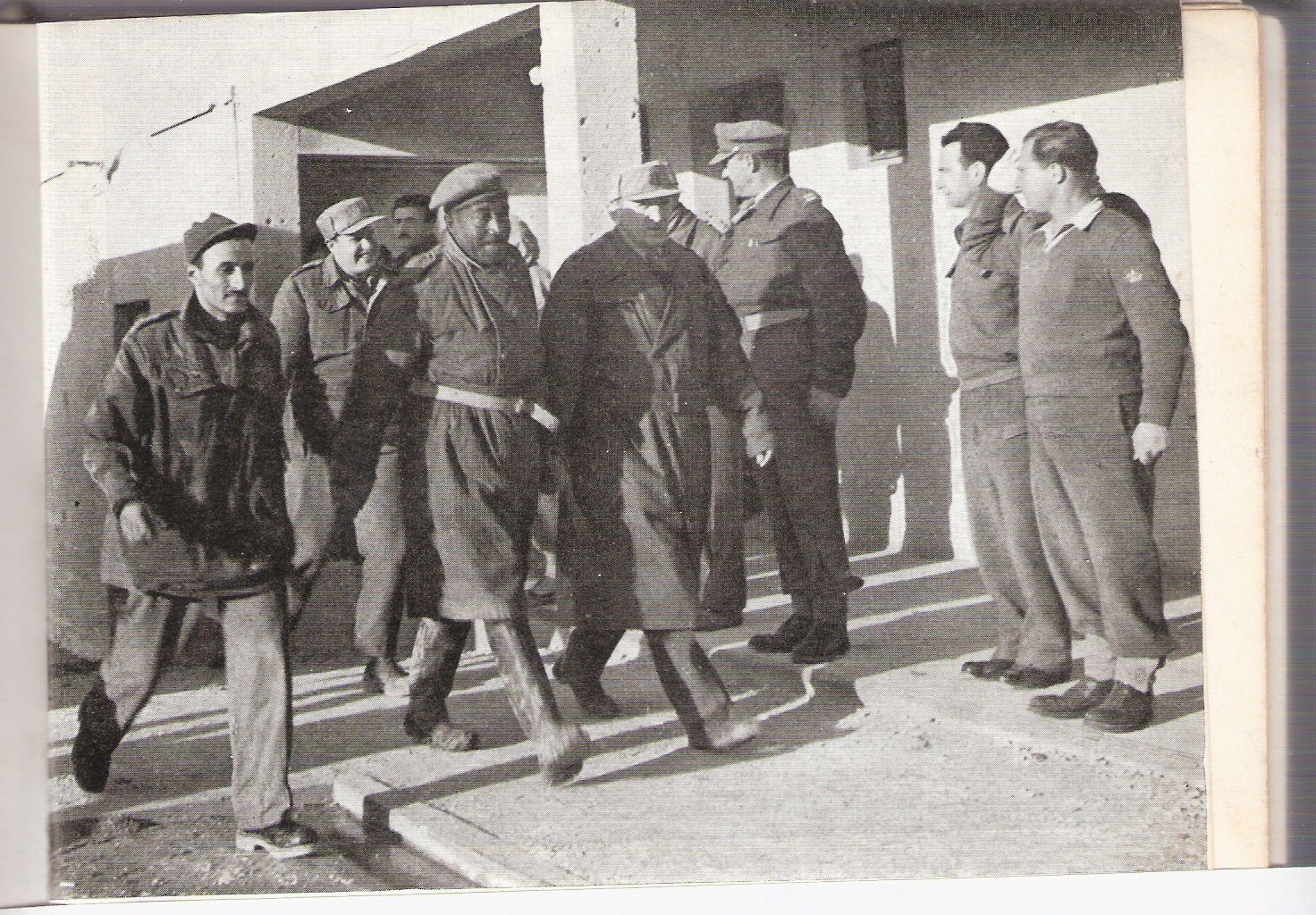
Egyptian commander Said Taha Bey in Palestine, November 1948.

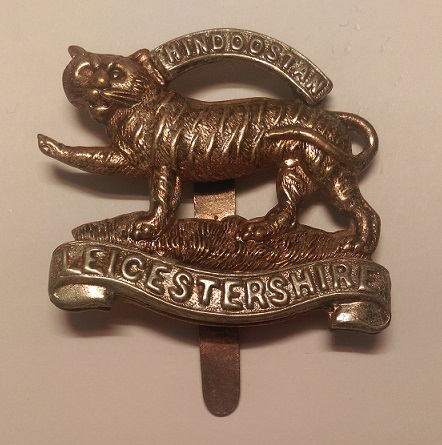
Badge of the Royal Leicestershire Regiment.

RAF detachments at El Fasher and El Geneina closed in August and November 1946, respectively. Sudanese military schools closed in 1947, while the army underwent reductions following the Second World War. Khartoum became home to the RAF's Tropical Experimental Unit in April 1947. On 16 March 1948, military training resumed in Omdurman through an infantry school housing the military college. In 1948, Sudanese volunteers served with Egyptian forces during the Arab–Israeli War on the Palestinian front. Colonel Hamid Saleh al-Malik selected 250 Second World War veterans for service with the Egyptian Army. After participating in a Cairo parade, these soldiers were distributed among different Egyptian units. Sudanese and Saudi volunteers reinforced Egyptian positions at Isdud during Operation Pleshet in May–June 1948. On 1 June 1948, Lashmer Whistler assumed command of the Sudan Defence Force and worked towards its Sudanisation. On 8 July, a Sudanese battalion attacked Bayt Daras but was repulsed by Israeli forces. Nasser later attributed its defeat to an erroneous flare that brought Egyptian artillery onto Sudanese positions. Reginald Scoones assumed command of the Sudan Defence Force in 1950, succeeding Whistler in the post. On 8–9 June 1951, Sudan Camel Corps and Eastern Arab Corps companies reinforced Khartoum from Al-Obeid and Kassala. Among the new Sudanese officers, Gaafar Nimeiry graduated from the military college in 1952. By March 1954, one British battalion remained in Khartoum, with supreme military command vested in the governor-general. The military college was Sudanised that year, and al-Tahir Bek became its commandant. In 1954, Ahmed Mohamed succeeded Reginald Scoones as army commander, transferring military leadership into Sudanese hands. The RAF's Tropical Experimental Unit ended its Khartoum deployment in July 1955.

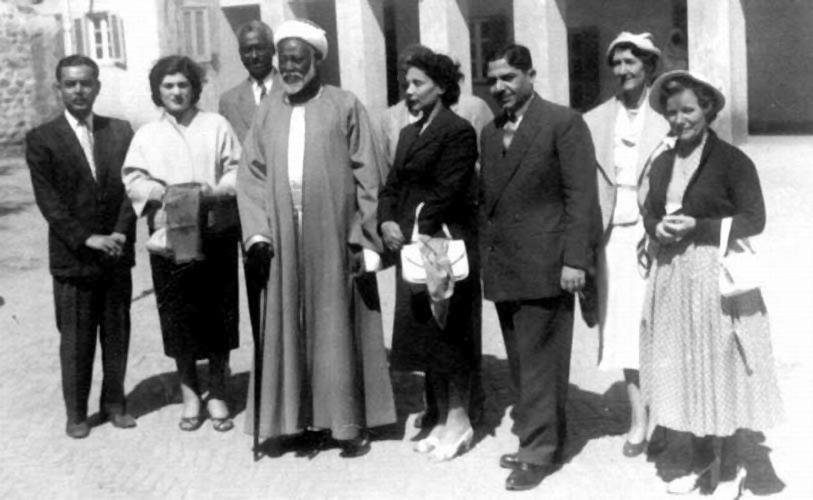
Abdul Rahman al-Mahdi with Adi Bitar and companions.

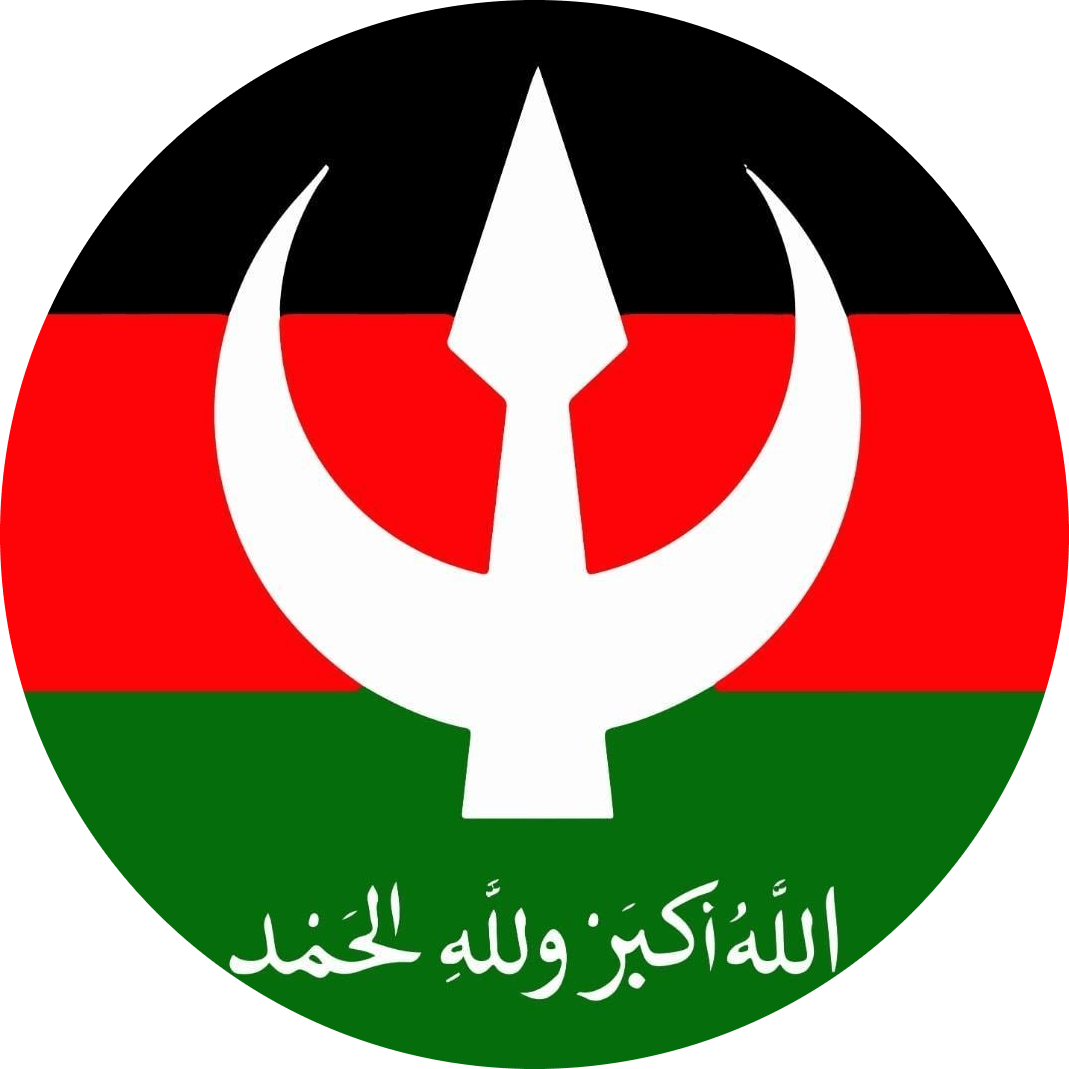
Logo of the Umma Party

On 1 March 1954, deadly disturbances in Khartoum prompted a state of emergency and postponed parliament's ceremonial opening. The Umma Party, backed by Abdul Rahman al-Mahdi, organised the Ansar demonstration against Muhammad Naguib's visit. Armed Ansar supporters clashed with police, temporarily overwhelming them before being driven back. In the subsequent trial, Umma leader Abd al-Rahman Nugdalla was charged with inciting the crowd. Ten policemen, including the British commandant and his Sudanese deputy, were killed during the Khartoum disturbances. At an October 1954 conference in Juba, the Liberal Party demanded federation to safeguard southern interests. Southern politicians condemned Sudanisation, which transferred most senior administrative appointments to northerners rather than southerners.

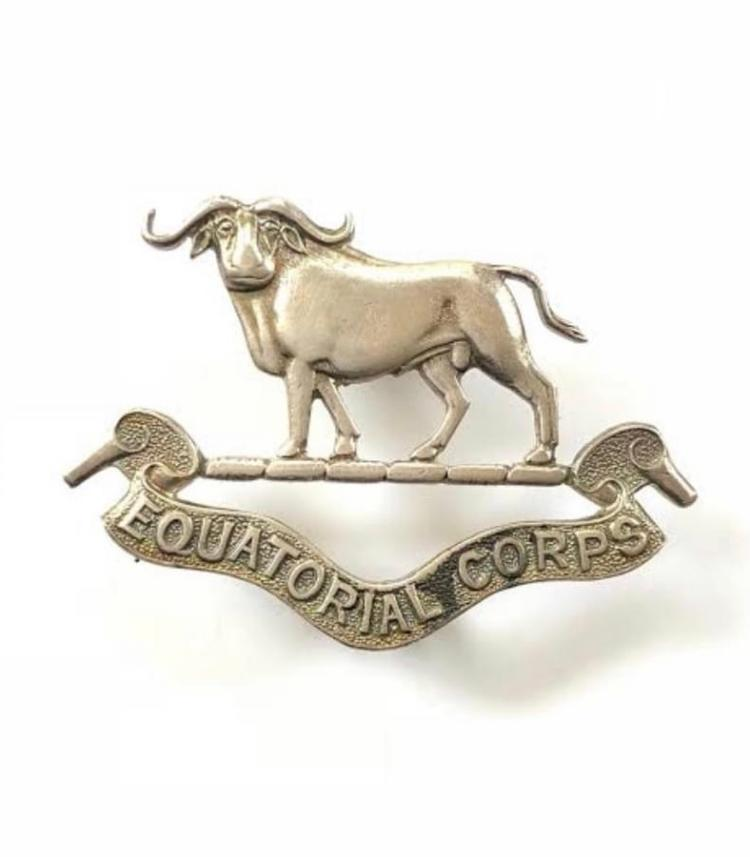
Emblem of the Equatoria Corps.

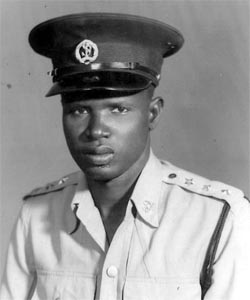
Gordon Muortat Mayen during his police career.

In July 1955, Elia Kuze, the parliamentary representative for Yambio, was arrested following a political dispute with local chiefs who supported the government. At a public meeting, Kuze and his supporters had demanded the chiefs' dismissal. He was subsequently tried by a chiefs' court for criminal intimidation. In June and July 1955, northern Sudanese managers replaced British administrators and technical staff at Nzara, in western Equatoria's Azande region, and dismissed 300 workers. On 26 July, workers demonstrated amid grievances over dismissals, wages and Elia Kuze's imprisonment. Some demonstrators plundered offices and northern merchants' shops. After unsuccessful attempts to disperse the crowd, the assistant district commissioner ordered police and soldiers to open fire; two northern merchants also fired upon riots. Sudanisation also heightened resentment among southern soldiers, as northern officers replaced British and Egyptian commanders while southerners remained predominantly in the ranks. On 16 August, the last British infantry battalion, the Royal Leicestershire Regiment's First Battalion, departed Sudan. Two days later, the Equatoria Corps mutinied at Torit after receiving orders to move to Khartoum. The corps recruited from several southern communities, including the Acholi, Pojulu, Kuku and Moru. The Lotuko constituted the largest ethnic group in its No. 2 Company, although they were not a majority throughout the corps. The mutineers seized the armoury, killed northern officers and civilians and looted their property. The uprising spread to Juba, Yei and Maridi, with attacks on northern officers, officials and civilians. Military, police and prison-service mutinies also occurred at Kapoeta, Terekeka, Nzara and Malakal. These outbreaks largely followed news from Torit rather than a coordinated southern revolt. Government reinforcements were airlifted south, while British officials urged the mutineers to surrender rather than supporting them. Although the government recovered the garrisons, some rebels escaped, sustaining guerrilla warfare beyond the initial mutiny. In Wau, southern junior officials, including police inspector Gordon Muortat Mayen, helped maintain calm during the disturbances.

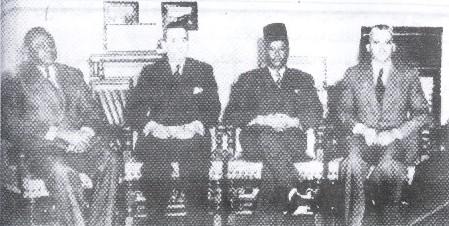
Four members of the Sovereignty Council, 1956.

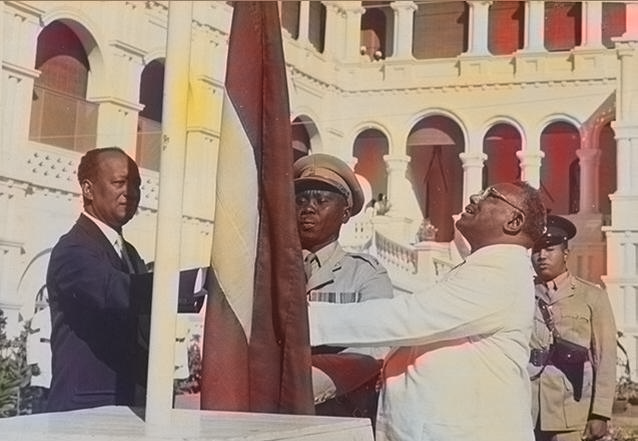
Sudan's independence ceremony, 1 January 1956.

On 19 December 1955, parliament unanimously declared independence without the plebiscite envisaged by the condominium powers. Abd al-Rahman Dabaka proposed the declaration, and Mashawir Jum'a Sahl seconded it. Parliament selected a five-member Sovereignty Council to replace the governor-general as head of state. Its members were Abdel Fattah al-Maghrabi, Dardiri Mohammed Osman, Ahmad Muhammad Salih, Ahmed Mohammed Yassin and Siricio Iro Wani.

Flag of Sudan raised on 1 January 1956.

The council assumed office on 1 January 1956, when the transitional constitution replaced the Self-Government Statute. That morning, Britain's representative Douglas Dodds-Parker and Egypt's representative Abdel Fattah Hassan delivered their governments' recognition to Prime Minister Ismail al-Azhari. Parliamentary speaker Babiker Awadalla administered the oath to the council members. At the palace ceremony, al-Azhari and opposition leader Muhammad Ahmad Mahjoub raised Sudan's flag as the British and Egyptian flags were lowered. Ali al-Mirghani and Abd al-Rahman al-Mahdi attended, while Dodds-Parker and Hassan received the flags representing their governments. Gadalla Gubara filmed the ceremony, recording the replacement of the British and Egyptian flags with Sudan's flag.

=== Abrogation of the condominium ===
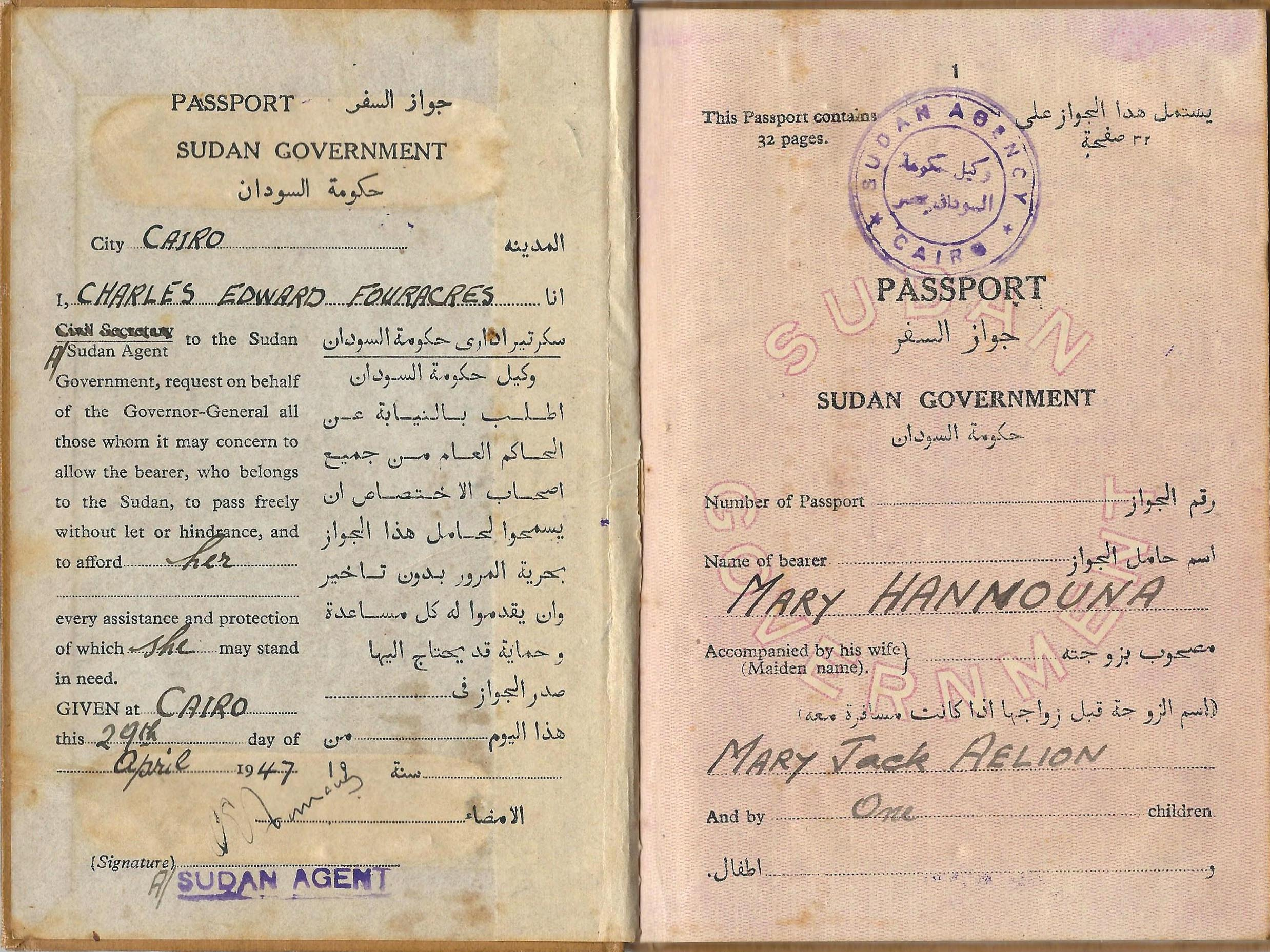
1947 Sudanese passport, being a consular issue from Cairo

Even when the British ended their occupation of Egypt in 1936 (with the exception of the Suez Canal Zone), they maintained their forces in Sudan. Successive governments in Cairo, repeatedly declaring their abrogation of the condominium agreement, declared the British presence in Sudan to be illegitimate, and insisted on full British recognition of King Farouk as "King of Egypt and the Sudan", a recognition which the British were loath to grant, not least because Farouk was secretly negotiating with Mussolini for an Italian invasion. The defeat of this damaging démarche of 1940 for Anglo-Egyptian relations helped to turn the tide of the Second World War.

It was the Egyptian Revolution of 1952 which finally initiated events which would eventually end the British and Egyptian occupation of Sudan. Having abolished the monarchy in 1953, Egypt's new leaders, Muhammad Naguib, who was raised as the son of an Egyptian army officer in Sudan, and Gamal Abdel Nasser, believed the only way to end the British domination in Sudan was for Egypt itself to officially abandon its sovereignty over Sudan.

Since the British claim to control in Sudan theoretically depended upon Egyptian sovereignty, the revolutionaries calculated that this tactic would compel British withdrawal. In addition, Nasser had known for some time that it would be problematic for Egypt to govern the impoverished Sudan.

=== Transition to independence ===
Provisional flag of Sudan used during the Afro-Asian Conference (April 1955)

In 1943 a North Sudan Advisory Council was established bringing a level of self-governance to the northern provinces of Anglo-Egyptian Sudan. At a conference held in Juba in 1947, it was decided to integrate the administration of the southern provinces with those of the north. Thirteen appointed representatives from the southern provinces took up seats in the Sudan Legislative Assembly in 1948.

On 12 February 1953, an agreement was reached between Egypt, the United Kingdom and the political representatives of Sudan to transition from condominium to self-government. Sudan was granted self-government in March 1953 and Ismail al-Azhari became Chief Minister in 1954. A constituent assembly was formed and a transitional constitution was drafted. Sudanese representatives would be able to participate in the Afro-Asian Conference planned for April 1955.

In October 1954, the governments of Egypt and the UK signed a treaty that would grant Sudan independence on 1 January 1956. Sudan became an independent state, the Republic of the Sudan, ending its nearly 136-year union with Egypt and its 56-year occupation by the British.

== Economy ==
Anglo-Egyptian Sudan was an agrarian society which depended mainly on agriculture and livestock, exporting cotton, gum arabic, sesame and groundnuts. Manufacturing was largely confined to processing agricultural products. In 1904, Leigh Hunt established cotton plantations. The enterprise became the Sudan Plantations Syndicate in 1907 under D. P. MacGillivray. Cotton cultivation increased after the completion of the Sennar Dam in 1925. Designed by Murdoch MacDonald and built by S. Pearson & Son, the dam cost approximately £6 million, or £9 million including canals. Its engineers included Oswald Prowde and John Watson Gibson. In 1950, the Sudan Gezira Board took over management of the Gezira Scheme under Arthur Gaitskell. The railway from Atbara reached the Red Sea in 1905 and Port Sudan in 1906. Other lines included the Gezira Light Railway and the Tokar–Trinkitat Light Railway, built in 1921–1922. The Jebel Aulia Dam was completed in 1937. During World War II, mechanised farming was introduced around Gedaref. In southern Sudan, the Azande Scheme operated cotton-processing facilities at Nzara, but faced high costs and transport difficulties. In southern Sudan, cattle herding was an important livelihood among the Dinka, Nuer, Murle, Toposa and Mundari. Many households had settlements but lived by transhumance between grazing areas. Other communities, including the Azande, Shilluk and Anuak, depended more heavily on subsistence agriculture. Sudan Airways was established in 1946 and began scheduled flights in 1947. Government expenditure on postwar development reached £14.6 million between 1946 and 1951 and £34 million between 1951 and 1956. Britain contributed a £2 million grant. A meat-processing plant, cement factory and brewery were established between 1949 and 1952. Between 1900 and 1914, Egypt provided £E5.4 million in development loans, which financed railway construction and Port Sudan. By 1913, it had also contributed approximately £E5.35 million to the Sudanese budget. Following the withdrawal of Egyptian troops in 1924, Egypt continued annual subsidies, initially £E750,000, which were gradually reduced until 1941.

== Demographics ==
The first nationwide census was conducted between May 1955 and June 1956. In remote areas, particularly the southern provinces and northern deserts, enumerators relied partly on estimates supplied by tribal chiefs and sample surveys. The adjusted population was 10,262,536, including approximately 5.19 million males and 5.08 million females. The six northern provinces accounted for 7,479,400 inhabitants (72.9%), compared with 2,783,136 (27.1%) in Bahr el-Ghazal, Equatoria and Upper Nile.

Population by province, 1955–1956
Region	Province	Population
Northern Sudan	Blue Nile	2,069,646
Northern Sudan	Kordofan	1,761,968
Northern Sudan	Darfur	1,328,765
Northern Sudan	Kassala	941,039
Northern Sudan	Northern	873,059
Northern Sudan	Khartoum	504,923
Southern Sudan	Bahr el-Ghazal	991,022
Southern Sudan	Equatoria	903,503
Southern Sudan	Upper Nile	888,611
Total		10,262,536

Most inhabitants lived in rural areas. About 854,000 people (8.3%) were classified as urban. The seven principal towns were Khartoum, Khartoum North, Omdurman, Port Sudan, El Obeid, Wad Madani and Atbara. Khartoum and its neighbouring towns accounted for approximately 30% of the urban population. Juba, with 10,670 inhabitants, was the largest town in southern Sudan.

The census listed 597 tribal subdivisions within 56 principal groups. Its classifications placed 39% of the population in the Arab category, 30% in southern groups, 13% in western groups, 6% each among the Beja and Nuba, 3% among Nubians and 3% among foreigners and miscellaneous groups. Among the larger communities were the Ja'alin, Shaigiya and Baggara in northern and central Sudan, the Fur, Masalit and Zaghawa in the west, and the Dinka, Nuer, Shilluk, Bari and Azande in the south.

A total of 157 languages were recorded, later grouped into broader categories. Arabic was spoken at home by approximately 51% of the population. Other languages included Beja, Nubian, Fur, Nuba languages, Dinka, Nuer, Bari and Zande. Islam was the principal religion in northern Sudan and much of the west, whereas indigenous religions and Christianity were more common in the south. Later estimates claim the religious composition at independence at approximately 73% Muslim, 25% followers of indigenous religions and 2% Christian.

== Education ==
Education under the condominium was provided by government, religious orders, Christian missions and private schools. In northern Sudan, government schools provided primary, intermediate and secondary education. Islamic khalwas taught the Quran and Arabic literacy. The Omdurman Scientific Institute, founded in 1912, followed the model of Al-Azhar University. Government education initially concentrated on training teachers, clerks, surveyors and technical staff to support the bureaucracy. In 1934, Vincent Llewellyn Griffiths founded Bakht er Ruda Teacher Training College near Ed Dueim. The college later expanded into adult literacy programmes. In 1907, Babikr Bedri established a girls' school at Rufaa with seventeen pupils, laying the foundations for the Ahfad. Other schools included Unity High School for Girls, founded in 1928, and Comboni College of Khartoum, established in 1929. Girls' elementary enrolment in northern Sudan increased from 7,747 in 1946 to 26,581 in 1956, although secondary education remained limited, particularly in rural areas. In southern Sudan, education was largely funded by the Church Mission Society, Catholic Verona Fathers and American Presbyterian Mission. Teaching in English and indigenous languages complying with the Southern Policy, which blocked northerns. Annual recurrent expenditure on southern education averaged £E95,000 between 1946 and 1950, while the 1951–1956 development plan allocated £E665,000. The first southern secondary school opened in 1948 and moved to permanent buildings at Rumbek in 1949. From 1953, the government sought to introduce common curricula and Arabic instruction across northern and southern schools. Literacy was so low in southern Sudan, with estimating rates of approximately 5% in Upper Nile and Bahr el-Ghazal . Gordon Memorial College opened in 1902, followed by the Kitchener School of Medicine in 1924. Courses in law, agriculture, veterinary science, engineering and arts were subsequently introduced. Gordon Memorial College became affiliated with the University of London in 1947, producing its first Sudanese graduates in 1950. It merged with the medical school in 1951 to form University College Khartoum, which became the University of Khartoum in 1956.

At independence, Sudan had 1,778 primary schools enrolling 208,688 pupils, 108 intermediate schools enrolling 14,632 and 49 government secondary schools enrolling 5,423. Education accounted for approximately 15.5% of government expenditure, while adult literacy was estimated at 23%.

== Healthcare ==
The Medical Department (1904), renamed the Sudan Medical Service (1924), established hospitals, dispensaries and sanitation programmes, although rural access remained limited. At Gordon Memorial College, Henry Wellcome funded the Wellcome Tropical Research Laboratories (1903), directed by Andrew Balfour and later Robert Archibald, which investigated malaria, schistosomiasis and leishmaniasis. The Gezira Scheme introduced drainage, mosquito control and quarantine, while southern campaigns addressed sleeping sickness. Officials also investigated yellow fever and smallpox. In Omdurman, Mabel Wolff founded a midwifery school in 1921, directed by her sister Gertrude Wolff. Mabel became Inspector of Midwives in 1930 and established an antenatal clinic, Elaine Hills-Young helped establish a child welfare centre in 1941 and supervised the training and inspection of midwives. These programmes later expanded into other provinces. Ali Bedri became the first Sudanese Minister of Health in 1949 and planned further medical training and services. Abdel Halim Mohamed directed Omdurman Hospital from 1950 and later Khartoum Hospital, while El-Tigani el-Mahi developed psychiatric services. Health expenditure rose from £E2,032,229 in 1951–1952 to £E2,806,290 in 1954–1955, including £E1,966,173 for hospitals and £E395,582 for hygiene and public health.

== Society and culture ==
Religion formed an important part of the social structure of Anglo-Egyptian Sudan, particularly through its geographical and tribal divisions. In the predominantly Muslim north, the Khatmiyya of the Al-Mirghani family had followers mainly in eastern and northern Sudan, while the Ansar maintained influence in western and parts of central Sudan. These affiliations overlapped with tribal and Sufi hierarchies, shaping religious authority and collective identity. The Tijaniyyah and Qadiriyya also maintained networks across Sudan, sometimes cooperating with larger movements while retaining varying degrees of independence. In southern Sudan, religion was more diverse but similarly embedded in tribal structures and social customs. Indigenous religions, including animist beliefs and ancestor worship, remained closely associated with communal identity, rituals and everyday life. The expansion of Christian missions then introduced new religious affiliations, sometimes coexisting with indigenous practices. Christianity nevertheless remained largely confined to converts and mission communities during much of the condominium, without displacing traditional beliefs as the dominant basis of communal religious life.

Gender roles in Anglo-Egyptian Sudan varied by region, religion and kinship structures. Across much of northern Sudan, women's roles centred on marriage, motherhood and domestic responsibilities, alongside agricultural labour, weaving and household production. In the Nuba Mountains of South Kordofan, however, some communities maintained different forms of gender expression and sexuality. The anthropologist Siegfried Frederick Nadel, conducting research in the late 1930s, documented cross-dressing and homosexuality among the Otoro, Moro, Nyima and Tira, including men who dressed and lived as women. Among the Korongo and Mesakin, he also recorded male same-sex marriages involving the payment of a goat as bride price, alongside strong traditions of male intimate relationships in cattle camps.

In urban areas, the introduction and expansion of colonial institutions, including Gordon Memorial College, government schools, administrative offices, railways, electricity and public services, accompanied the growth of newspapers, radio broadcasting, literature, visual arts, photography, cinema, music, theatre, football and organised sports. Cities such as Khartoum, Omdurman, Atbara and Port Sudan then developed a more diverse urban culture through libraries, printing presses, cafés, cinemas, sporting clubs, literary societies, cultural associations, musical performances, and drinking houses. The traditional anādī, often operated by women, served as places for drinking, entertainment and social gatherings, while some were also associated with sex work.

Although Anglo-Egyptian Sudan was administered as a single territory under one governor-general, its communities differed considerably in religion, language, ethnicity, kinship, marriage, inheritance, gender roles, dress, education, labour and material culture, particularly between northern and southern Sudan. In much of the north, Islamic institutions, Arabic-language education, Sufi orders and commercial networks shaped social life, while southern communities maintained diverse ethnic and indigenous beliefs, languages, customary authorities and agricultural and pastoral practices. Differences also extended to settlement patterns, literacy, music, dance, oral traditions and access to urban Colonial policies, particularly indirect rule and the Southern Policy, reflected these existing divisions by restricting movement in designated areas and maintaining separate systems of education and local administration.

== Provinces ==
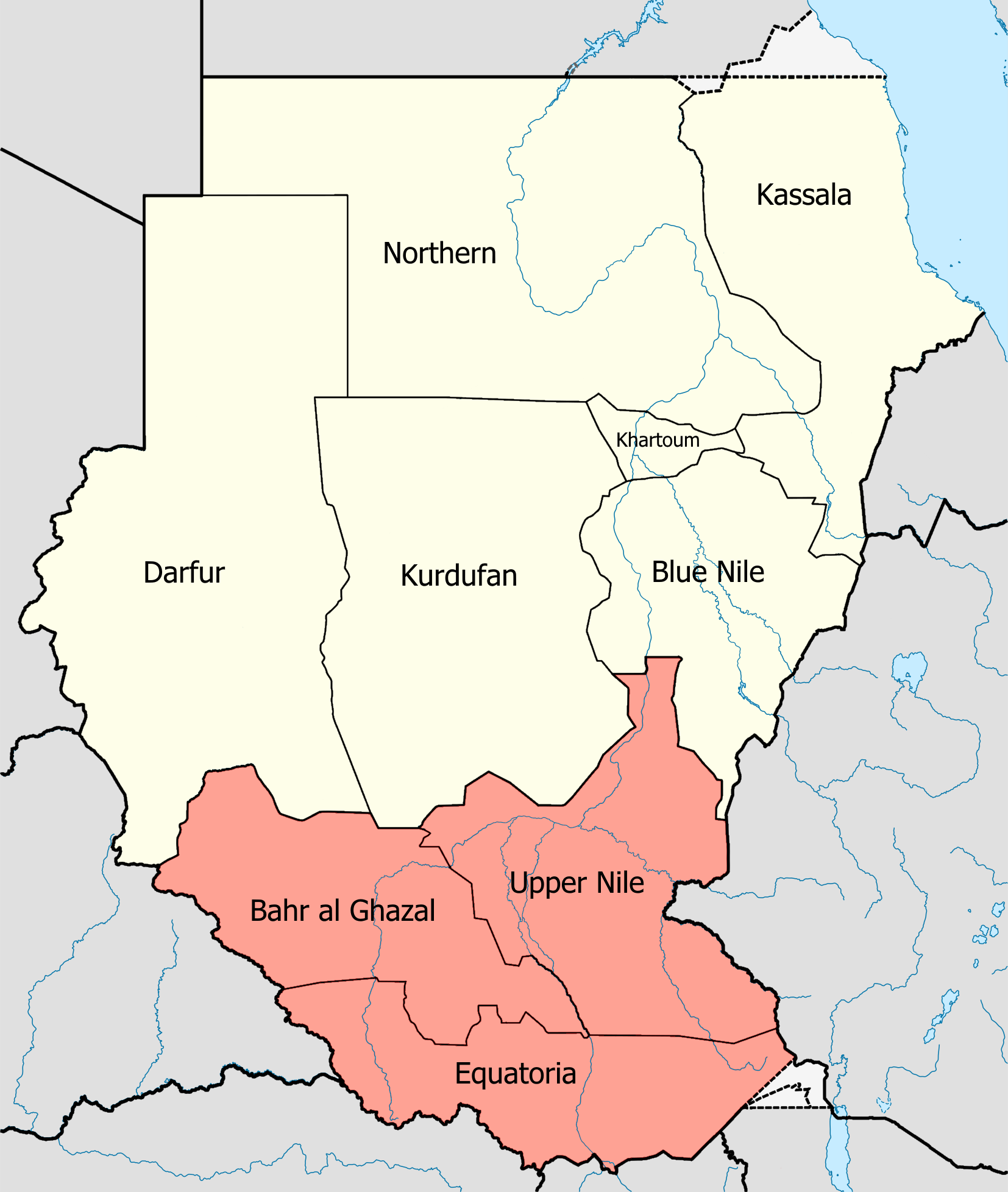
Provinces of Anglo-Egyptian Sudan in 1948. Provinces of the future South Sudan are coloured in red.

Anglo-Egyptian Sudan was divided into eight provinces, which were ambiguous when created but became well defined by the beginning of World War II. The eight provinces were: Blue Nile, Darfur, Equatoria, Kassala, Khartoum, Kordofan, Northern, and Upper Nile. In 1948, Bahr al Ghazal split from Equatoria.

== Office holders ==
=== Chief Justices ===
- 1903–1917 Wasey Sterry (until 1915 Chief Judge)
- 1917–1925 Robert Hay Dun
- 1925–1930 Sir Bernard Humphrey Bell
- 1930?–1936? Howell Owen
- 1936–1942 Thomas Percival Creed
- 1942–1944 Sir Hubert Flaxman
- 1944–1946 Cecil Harry Andrew Bennett
- 1946–1948 Sir Charles Cecil George Cumings
- 1947–1950 Thomas Arthur Maclagan
- 1950–1955 William O'Brien Lindsay
- 1956–1964 Muhammad Ahmad Abu Rannat

=== Chief Ministers ===
No.	Portrait	Name (Birth–Death)	Term of office			Political party
No.	Portrait	Name (Birth–Death)	Took office	Left office	Time in office	Political party
1		Abdul Rahman al-Mahdi	22 October 1952	November 1953	1 year, 10 days	National Umma Party
2		Ismail al-Azhari (1900–1969)	6 January 1954	1 January 1956	1 year, 360 days	Democratic Unionist Party

== See also ==
- Anglo-Egyptian conquest of Sudan
- Egypt–Sudan relations
- Egypt–United Kingdom relations
- Sudan–United Kingdom relations
- History of the Anglo-Egyptian Sudan
- Sudan Self-Government Statute
- First Sudanese Republic
- Graduates' General Congress – Sudanese independence movement (1938–1943)

== Bibliography ==
- Abdel-Rahim, Muddathir (1978). Changing Patterns of Civilian-Military Relations in the Sudan. Uppsala, Sweden: Scandinavian Institute of African Studies. ISBN 91-7106-137-1.
- Beshir, Mohamed Omer (1977). Revolution and nationalism in the Sudan. London, UK: Rex Collings Ltd. ISBN 0-901720-38-0.
- Daly, Peter Malcolm (1986). Empire on the Nile: The Anglo-Egyptian Sudan, 1898-1934. Cambridge University Press. ISBN 978-0521894371.
- Daly, Peter Malcolm (1991). Imperial Sudan. Cambridge, United Kingdom: Cambridge University Press. ISBN 0-521-39163-6.
- Duncan, J.S.R (1952). The Sudan. London and Edinburgh, UK: Blackwood and sons.
- Due, John Fitzgerald (1977). Rail and Road Transport in the Sudan. Urbana-Champagne, Illinois, USA: College of Commerce and Business Administration, University of Illinois at Urbana-Champaign, USA.
- Fabunmi, L. A. (1960). The Sudan in Anglo-Egyptian Relations. A case study in power politics, 1800-1956. London, UK: Longmans, Green & Co.Ltd.
- Henderson, Kenneth David Druitt (1946). Survey of the Anglo-Egyptian Sudan 1898–1944. London, UK: Longmans, Green and Co. Ltd.
- Henderson, Kenneth David Druitt (1966). Sudan Republic. London, UK: F. A. Praeger.
- Holt, Peter Malcolm; Daly, M.W. (2011). The History of Sudan: from the coming of Islam to the present day (Sixth ed.). Harlow, United Kingdom: Pearson Education Limited. ISBN 978-1-4058-7445-8.
- Hyslop, John (1952). Sudan Story. London, UK: The Naldrett Press.
- Johnson, Douglas H. (1998). Sudan. Part I 1942-1950. Series B, Volume 5, British documents on the end of Empire. London, UK: The Stationery Office for the University of London. Institute of Commonwealth Studies. ISBN 0-11-290563-3.
- Johnson, Douglas H. (1998). Sudan. Part II 1951-1961. Series B, Volume 5, British documents on the end of Empire. London, UK: The Stationery Office for the University of London. Institute of Commonwealth Studies. ISBN 0-11-290564-1.
- Keegan, John (2005). Dear, I.C.B.; Foot, M.R.D (eds.). Oxford Companion to World War II. Oxford University Press. ISBN 978-0-19-280670-3.
- Berry, LaVerle, ed. (2015). Sudan. a country study (PDF). Washington, DC, USA: Federal Research Division, Library of Congress. ISBN 978-0-8444-0750-0.
- Metz, Helen Chapin, ed. (1991). Sudan. a country study. Washington, DC, USA: Federal Research Division, Library of Congress.
- MacMichael, Sir Harold Alfred (1934). The Anglo-Egyptian Sudan. London, UK: Faber & Faber Ltd.
- Niblock, Tim (1987). Class and Power in Sudan: the dynamics of Sudanese Politics, 1898-1985. United Kingdom: Basingstoke Macmillan. ISBN 0333419766.
- Sharkey, Heather Jane (2003). Living with Colonialism: Nationalism and Culture in the Anglo-Egyptian Sudan. Berkeley, United States: University of California Press. ISBN 0-520-23558-4.
- Sudan Government Public Relations (1949). Sudan Almanac 1949. Khartoum, Sudan: The Sudan Government, Khartoum, Sudan.
- Sudan Government Public Relations (1951). Sudan Almanac 1951. Khartoum, Sudan: The Sudan Government, Khartoum, Sudan.
- Theobald, Alan Buchan (1951). The Mahdi¯ya. A history of the Anglo-Egyptian Sudan, 1881-1899. London, UK: Longmans, Green and Co.
