= Muhammad al-Mahdi al-Majdhub =

Sudanese poet (1919–1982)

- محمد المهدي المجذوب
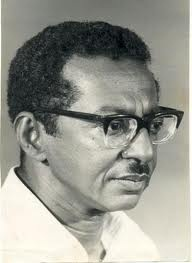
- Born: 1919; Ad-Damir, Anglo-Egyptian Sudan
- Died: 3 March 1982 (aged 62–63); Omdurman, Sudan
- Education: Gordon Memorial College
- Occupations: Poet, writer, accountant
- Relatives: Abdullah El Tayib (cousin)

Personal details
- Party: Republican Brotherhood

Muhammad al-Mahdi al-Majdhub (Arabic: محمد المهدي المجذوب //; 1919 – 3 March 1982), also spelled al-Maghut or al-Majzoub, was a renowned Sudanese poet. He is widely recognised as one of the pioneers in Sudanese poetry and is credited with being one of the first poets of Sudanese Arabic poetry and "Sudanism". His contributions to Sudanese literature have left a lasting impact on the poetic landscape of the country.

== Early life and education ==
Muhammad al-Mahdi al-Majdhub was born in 1919 in al-Damar, the capital of the River Nile state in North Sudan. His father is the Sufi sheikh, known in Sudan as Muhammad al-Majdhub, who belongs to the Ja’aliyin tribe of the north-central Sudanese tribes. He was khalwa educated, where he learned reading, writing and the Quran. According to Babiker Hassan Omer, the khalwa's fire (known as al-Toqaba) inspired al-Majdhub to call his first collection "The Fire of Majadhib". He wrote in the introduction to the collection “The knights, jurists and paranormal people watched around it, glorifying and chanting, His Eminence among people and security comfort, for centuries".

The Sudanese writer and academic Abdullah El Tayib (1921-2003) grew up in al-Majdhub's house after the death of his father and they became friends and both poets.

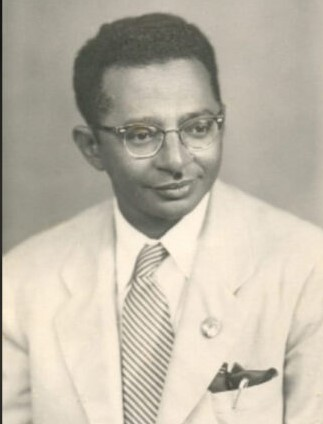
Young al-Majzoub

Al-Majdhub travelled to Khartoum for school, and joined the Gordon Memorial College and graduated as an accountant. Al-Majdhub worked as an accountant in the government of Sudan and moved between the north, south, east and west, which benefited him in creating an imaginary repertoire that, along with his innate readiness, paved the way for the development of his poetic craft.

== Literary works ==
During this era, there emerged publications such as Al-Sudan, Al-Nahda, and Al-Fajr. Within the pages of Al-Fajr, writers such as al-Tijani Yusuf Bashir and Muhammad Ahmad Mahjub made their initial debut.

According to historian Huda Fakhreddine, the members of the Fajr group possessed an understanding of Sudan's hybrid cultural heritage and the historical currents that contributed to its distinctiveness. They aimed to shape the linguistic symbols that would define a national identity.

Huda continues that Muhammad Ahmad Mahjub articulated the concept of Sudanese literature "written in Arabic but infused with the idioms of our land, as this is what sets the literature of one nation apart from another." The Fajr group's found its earliest manifestation in the works of Muhammad al-Mahdi al-Majdhub. He became the first poet whose writings reflected an awareness of belonging to both "Black" and "Arab" cultures.

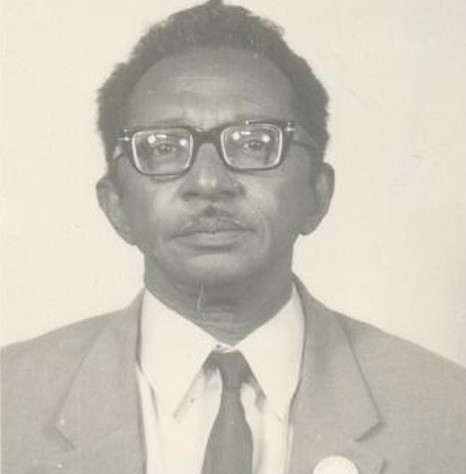
Late al-Majzoub

The critic Osama Taj Al-Sirr believes that "Sudanism" (or Sudanisation) was clear in al-Majdhub's poetry, which appeared in his imagination, images and language, which his late son, the journalist Awad al-Karim al-Majdhub, who says about his father, "Perhaps what distinguishes the language of al-Majdhub is its mixing - sometimes - between classical and dialectal Arabic to the point of using the language of ordinary speech and planting it in the fabric of his poem. Osama Taj Al-Sirr, Professor of literature at the University of Khartoum told Al-Jazeera Net that "al-Majdhub conveyed the Sudanese life to poetry, and he is one of the first to mix between the eloquent and the common, the Sudanese project represents for him a stylistic technique".

Al-Siddiq Omar Al-Siddiq, attests the Sudanism was not the only prominent feature of al-Majdhub, and the poetic imagery is one of the clearest among them. Al-Majdhub was creative in taking pictures and bold in drawing them, and this "audacity" is not limited to pictures only.

One of the most important features of al-Majdhub's poetry is his interest in the simple man in the street, as Osama Taj al-Sirr believes that Al-Majdhub "moved poetry - in a highly poetic and pictorial language - from the centrality of life to its periphery (linguistic, social, and political). He wrote about coffee shop owners, shoe-cleaners, pickpockets, the bean seller, the shard seller, the beggar, and so on." Al-Majdhub mentioned the reasons in the introduction to Nar al-Majadhib: "I have benefited a lot from mingling with people, especially the poor, for they have a striking sincerity that has benefited me and cured me".

Al-Majdhub authored a number of other books and collections. He also wrote in magazines such as The Nile, Hana Omdurman, Youth and Sports, and other Sudanese publications. In Arabic, Dar Al-Hilal, Al-Doha, and the Beirut magazine Al-Adab were publishing his work. He has several radio interviews, the most prominent of which are his interviews with Sudanese radio and television, Voice of the Arabs, Voice of America, German, Egyptian and Tunisian radio.

Noah’s Ark is a womb of a virgin
That rested on Mount Judi, bestowing life
Moses coffin is a womb
Jesus’ cross is a womb
And Ghar Hiraa is a womb
And this Deluge abated with no ark,
No coffin, no cross and no Hiraa
Where is the refuge?
To the moon!
Does the earth escape from itself?
Searching for its kin?

— The Deluge

=== Poetic and literary works ===
1. Diwan Fire of al-Majazib (Arabic: نار المجاذيب), 1969
2. Diwan Honor and Immigration (Arabic: الشرافة والهجرة), 1973
3. Lengthy Good News, Crows, Exodus (Arabic: طولة البشارة، الغربان، الخروج), 1975
4. Diwan Manabir (Arabic: منابر), 1982
5. Diwan Of Those Things (Arabic: تلك الأشياء), 1982
6. A Beggar in Khartoum (Arabic: شحاذ في الخرطوم), 1984 (poetry play)
7. Diwan Cruelty in Milk (Arabic: القسوة في الحليب), 2005
8. Diwan Sounds and Smoke (Arabic: أصوات ودخان), 2005
9. Diwan Raid and Sunset (Arabic: غارة وغروب), 2013

=== Political life ===
Al-Majdhub founded with Mahmoud Muhammad Taha the Republican Brotherhood in Sudan in 1945. The Republican Brotherhood was involved in the fight for independence against British-Egyptian colonialism. Al-Majdhub has poems praising the positions of the Republican Party and Mahmoud Muhammad Taha.

Al-Majdhub died on 3 March 1982 in Omdurman.

== Legacy ==
Al-Majdhub has gained recognition in the history of Sudanese literature as a trailblazer in the modernisation of Sudanese poetry. He is credited with founding a significant poetic movement, along with his relative Abdullah El Tayib, which introduced a fresh approach to poetic creation, breaking away from traditional and rigid poetic forms and doctrines. This new school of poetry embraced a more unrestrained and liberated style, in line with the practices of contemporary poets.
