= Mandour El Mahdi =

Education pioneer in Sudan

Professor Mandour El Mahdi
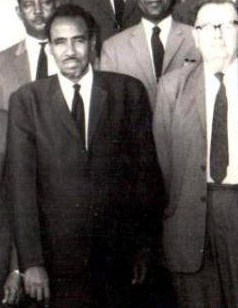

Principal of the Institute of Education, Bakht er Ruda (Sudan)
- In office 1961–1966

Director of Education (Saudi Arabia)
- In office 1970–1981

Principal of the Institute of Education (Sudan)
- In office 1968–1970

Personal details
- Born: March 1919 Umbukole, Sudan
- Died: October 1981 (aged 62) London

Mandour El Mahdi (March 1919 – October 1981) was a Sudanese administrator and educator. He was one of the pioneers in the development of education in Sudan after the country's independence from the United Kingdom in 1956, and he later became Director of Education in Saudi Arabia. He was also the author of A Short History of the Sudan (1965), one of the first history books to be written about what was then Africa's biggest country. It was used for the history syllabus in Sudan until 1989.

== Early life ==
El Mahdi was born in Umbukole, a small village in the north of Sudan near Korti. His mother died from Typhoid fever when he was very young, and his father provided for the family until he became ill and was unfit to work, at which point his eldest brother went to work in order to support the family. After attending a small primary school in Umbukole and then a secondary school, Mandour was accepted into the Faculty of Education at Gordon Memorial College (later known as the University of Khartoum) and transferred to the University of London for his final year.

== Career in Sudan ==
Sudan became independent from the United Kingdom on 1 January 1956, and Ismail al-Azhari of the Democratic Unionist Party became the first Prime Minister of the Republic of Sudan. After his graduation and marriage, El Mahdi worked for the Institute of Education for several years, and in 1960 was selected to participate in the Eleventh Session of the UNESCO General Conference in Paris. Shortly afterwards, he was commissioned by the Government of Sudan to head the Institute of Education in Bakht er Ruda.

=== Bakht er Ruda ===
The Institute of Education in Bakht er Ruda had been established in 1934 by Mr. P. Garifet, and was the first Institute of Education in Sudan, with the objective of enhancing the school curriculum across the country and training teachers who had not received primary education. Garifet was the first principal of the institution from October 1934 until February 1950. Upon being chosen to head the institution, Mandour and his family moved to Bakht er Ruda, and he served as principal from July 1961 until July 1966. It was during this time that he wrote his famous history book, A Short History of the Sudan. From his position at this institute, he became one of the key figures responsible for designing the new education system in Sudan.

=== Principal of the Institute of Education, Sudan ===
Following Mandour's time at Bakht er Ruda, the al-Azhari administration appointed him as Vice-Principal of the Institute of Education in Sudan in 1967, becoming Principal in 1968, where he continued to plan and implement education systems in other parts of Sudan.

However, following the military coup of 1969 led by Gaafar Nimeiry, al-Azhari and many other politicians were either imprisoned or sacked and the Nimeiry administration sought to change the existing Sudanese education system. El Mahdi, who was close to al-Azhari, strongly opposed the new government, and was removed as Principal of the Institute of Education just two months after the coup, following a series of disputes with new Education Minister Mohiuddin Saber.

== Move to Saudi Arabia ==
Just a couple of days after his dismissal by Saber, the Saudi Ambassador to Sudan visited El Mahdi at home in Khartoum and told him that the Minister of Education in Saudi Arabia wanted him to become the first Director of Education in their country. El Mahdi accepted the invitation, and moved to Saudi Arabia with his family in 1970.

After working in Saudi Arabia for several years, he received a letter from Abdalla Eltayeb, recently appointed Vice-Chancellor of the University of Khartoum, who wanted him to become the vice-president of the university and lead the university's Faculty of Education. El Mahdi negotiated a temporary deal with the Saudi Minister of Education and came back to Sudan to work at the university in 1976. While there, El Mahdi founded the Department of Special Education in order to prepare and train future teachers for work in educational institutions. However, a short time later, Eltayeb was dismissed by the Nimeiry administration and El Mahdi immediately resigned from his post and returned to Saudi Arabia.

El Mahdi was later offered the chance to work for UNESCO. The Minister of Education in Saudi Arabia recommended that it would be better if he was nominated by his own country, but the Nimeiry administration refused as he was an opponent of their regime. The Saudi government then decided to nominate him to represent their country, and he worked for UNESCO for over two years.

In the early 1980s, Mandour was selected to become the Vice-Chancellor of the Islamic University of Madinah, but fell ill shortly after he took up the post, and died in London in October 1981. He is buried in the Khatmiyya graveyard in Sudan.

== Legacy ==
After El Mahdi's death, Abdalla Eltayeb published a poetry book called Four Tears for Four Great Men, one of whom was El Mahdi, whom he describes as one of the "Greatest men in Sudan". A hall at the University of Khartoum is named in El Mahdi's honor.

== Publications ==
- Mahdi, Mandour El (1984). A short history of the Sudan (repr. ed.). London [u.a.]: Oxford Univ. Press. p. 154. ISBN 0-19-913158-9.
