= Atbara (disambiguation) =

Atbara may refer to:

- Atbara, a city in Sudan
- Atbara District, a district in Sudan
- Atbarah River, a river in Ethiopia and Sudan
- Atbara House, an historic building in Singapore
