= Hanan al-Neel =

Sudanese singer

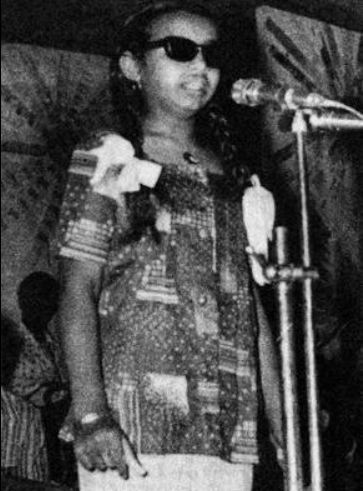
- Hanan al-Neel
- Born: Ad-Damar
- Citizenship: Sudan
- Occupation: Sudanese singer
- Notable work: The song "Ya Morsal"

Hanan al-Neel (Arabic: حنان النيل) is a Sudanese singer with a visual impairment. She is known particularly for traditional and folk Sudanese music. Her work is celebrated for its authentic representation of Sudanese culture and heritage, often featuring the oud. She retired from singing in 2003 for religious reasons. Among her notable works is the song "Ya Morsal," which highlights her ability to blend traditional melodies with contemporary themes.

She is from Ad-Damar, the capital of River Nile State, and was born in Block 2, next to the house of the scholar Professor Abdullah El Tayib.
