= Atbara Airport =

Airport in Sudan

- IATA: ATB; ICAO: HSAT

Summary
- Airport type: Public
- Serves: Atbara, Sudan
- Elevation AMSL: 1,198 ft / 365 m
- Coordinates: 17°42′35″N 34°03′25″E

Map
- Location of airport in Sudan

Runways
Direction	Length		Surface
Direction	m	ft	Surface
	1,800	5,906
- Source: Great Circle Mapper

Atbara Airport (IATA: ATB, ICAO: HSAT) is an airport serving Atbarah (or Atbara), a town located in the River Nile state in northeastern Sudan.

== Facilities ==
The airport resides at an elevation of 1,181 feet (360 m) above mean sea level. It has one runway which measures 1,800 by 40 metres (5,906 ft × 131 ft).
