= Khalwa (school) =

Islamic school in Sudan

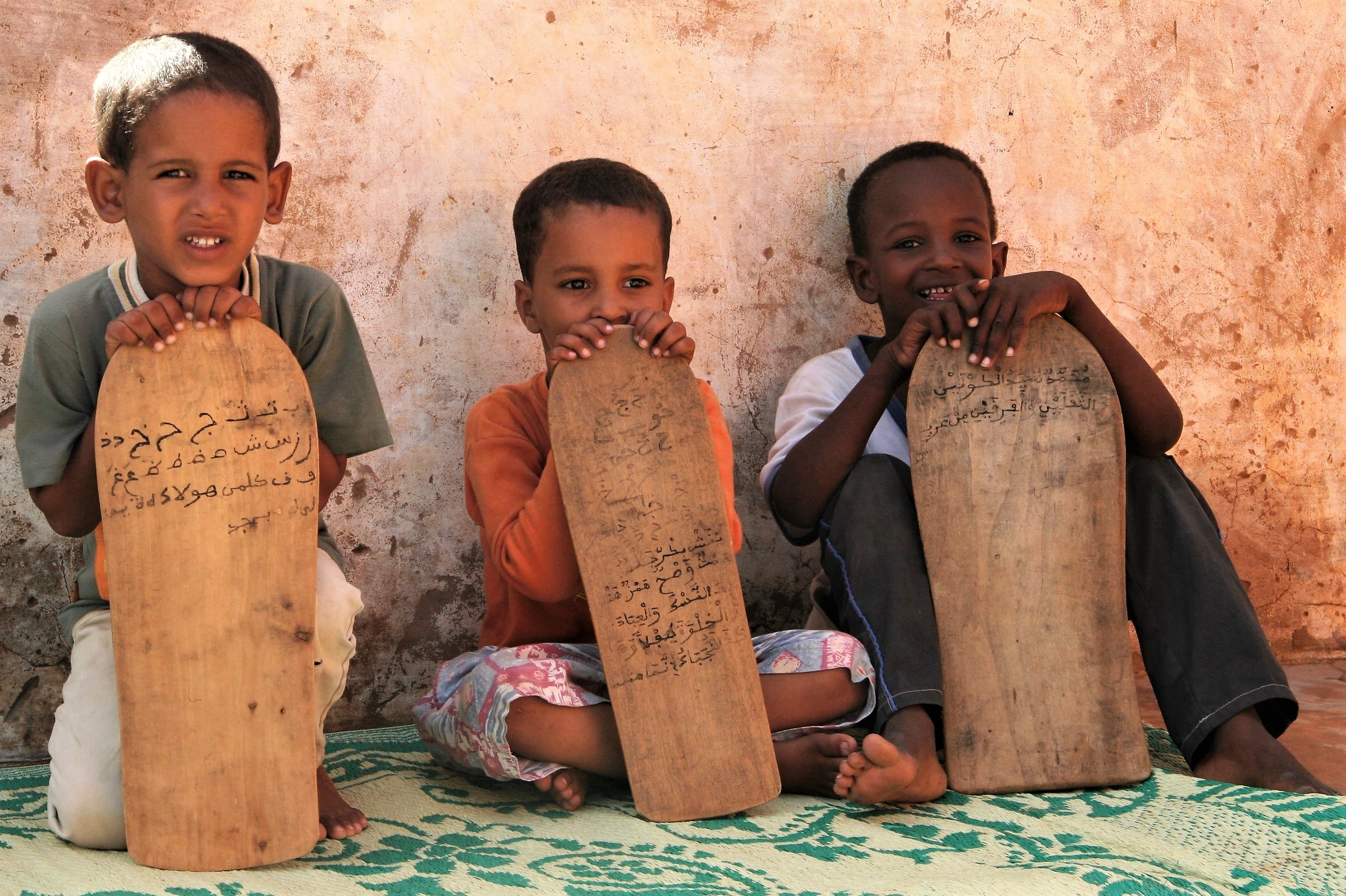
Khalwa pupils in Mauritania holding wooden tablets

A Khalwa or al-Khalwa (Arabic: الخلوة; plural Khalawi) is an elementary Quranic school in Sudan, where children study and memorise the Quran, learn Arabic, and study Islamic jurisprudence (Fiqh). The khalwa has an important and fundamental role in the history of children's education in Sudan, due to the former dominance of Sufism in the country, with the term "khalwa" derived from the Khalwati order of Sufism. While the khalwa provides free meals, drinks, and accommodation, and has been considered integral in addressing illiteracy; investigative reports have revealed that some of these institutions have been involved in child abuse practices, including sexual assault, corporal punishment, torture and forced labour.

The khalwa is similar to the Kuttab in Egypt, and Pesantren in Indonesia. It is also called Mhdra in Mauritania, Daara in Senegal, and Almajiranci in Nigeria.

== History ==
Islam entered Sudan in 651, after the fall of Makuria. The Funj Sultanate appeared in the early sixteenth century, and the khalwa was introduced before or during the rule of sheikh Ajib Al-Mangalik (1570–1611). Some scholars assert it was before that, but it was surely expanded during Al-Mangalik's reign. The khalwa began as a compromise between scholars of the Maliki school which refuses to teach boys or let them pray in mosques, and Sufism, which tends to endorse solitude and being alone away from people as the term "khalwa" derived from the Khalwati order of Sufism. The khalwa is typically a building attached to a mosque.

== Significance ==
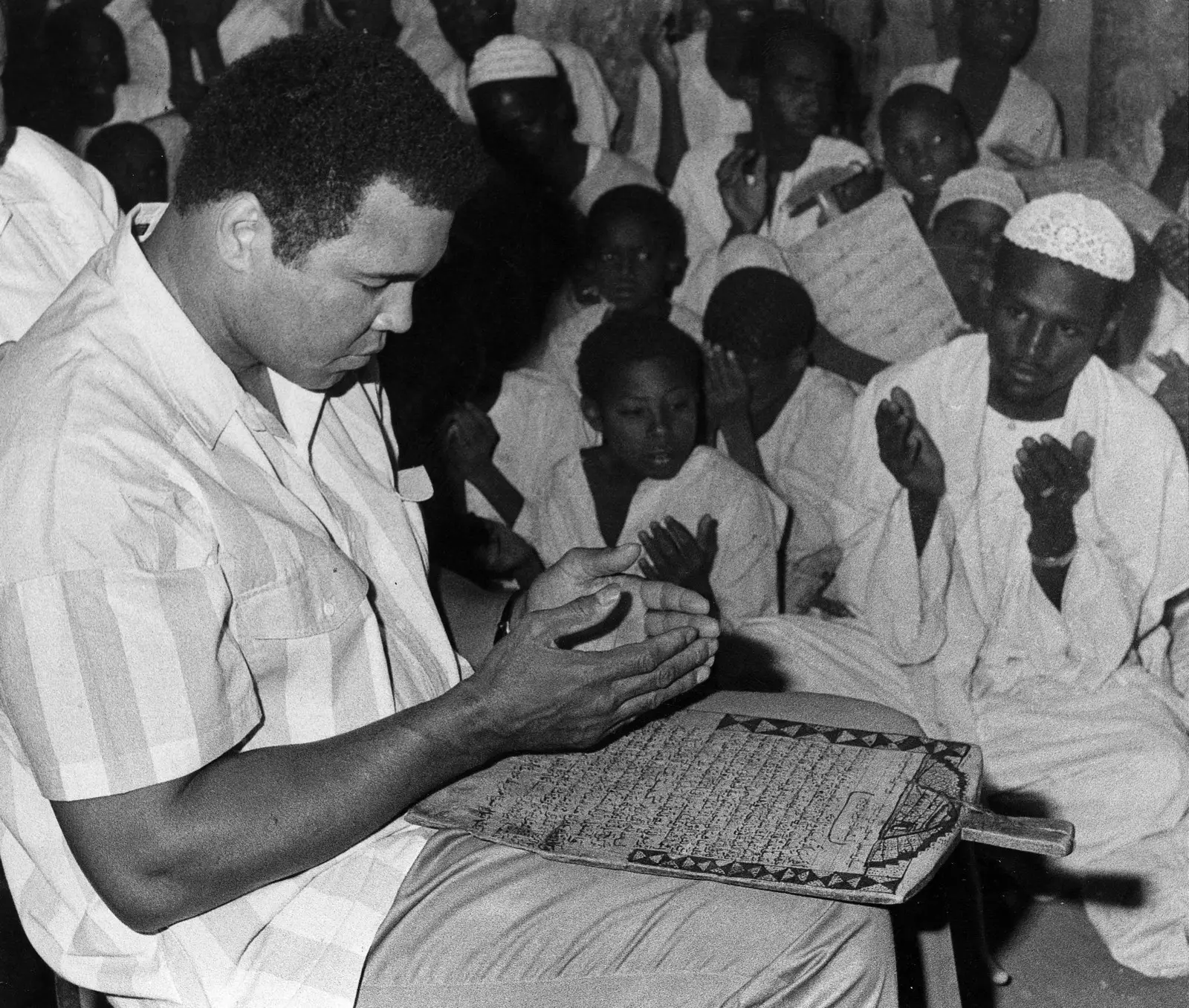
Muhammad Ali in the khalwa during his visit to Sudan in 1988

The khalwa teaches the Qur’an to children in Sudan. In Sudan, there are 30,000 khalawi with more than 100,000 students. They teach children to read, write, and memorise the Qur’an, as well as Arabic, Quranic studies, and Islamic jurisprudence (Fiqh). Khalwas provide free education, food, drink and shelter. They are therefore attractive to low-income families, who are unable, in most cases, to send their children to public schools. However, some children attend both a public school and a khalwa. In a country where more than 60% of the adult population is illiterate; khalawi are important in tackling illiteracy in Sudan, and some other African countries like Chad, Eritrea, Djibouti, Mali, Mauritania, and Somalia.

The khalwa is similar to the Kuttab in Egypt and Pesantren in Indonesia, but they differ in their origin, their building architecture and the schooling system. The khalwa is known by many names, such as the Qur'anic, the university, or the m'siid (Arabic: المْسِيد). It is also called Mhdra (Arabic: المحظرة) in Mauritania, Daara in Senegal, and Almajiranci in Nigeria.

Most khalawi are named after a sheikh or region: like Khalawi al-Ghubish in Berber (northern Sudan), Khalawi Wd Dalvadni (central Sudan), Khalawi al-Burai (western Sudan), Khalawi Hamishkoreib (eastern Sudan), which was awarded the Order of Accomplishment by President Jaafar Nimeiry. Although all khalawi in Sudan teach in a very traditional way, the khalwa of sheikh Al-Sadiq Khaled in Omdurman worked to modernise the idea by introducing modern technologies in the field of memorising the Qur'an by establishing an electronic library in Sudan. Some khalawi also introduced teaching English and math to their curriculum.

== Teaching ==
=== Style ===
The students, normally called “al-Hiran” (Arabic: الحيران), are not divided into classes as is customary in modern schools. Rather, the khalwa follows an individual approach that depends on the student receiving knowledge directly from his sheikh. The sheikh follows his students and teaches each of them according to his ability and level. The student does not need a certain number of years to graduate, but progresses according to his ability. A single sheikh – with the help of advanced students – can supervise about a hundred students, each at a different level of education than his peers.

The students are typically boys under the age of 15, women are not allowed with the exception of children at an early age. However, there are girls-only khalawi, like the one in Jongolai.

=== Materials and methods ===
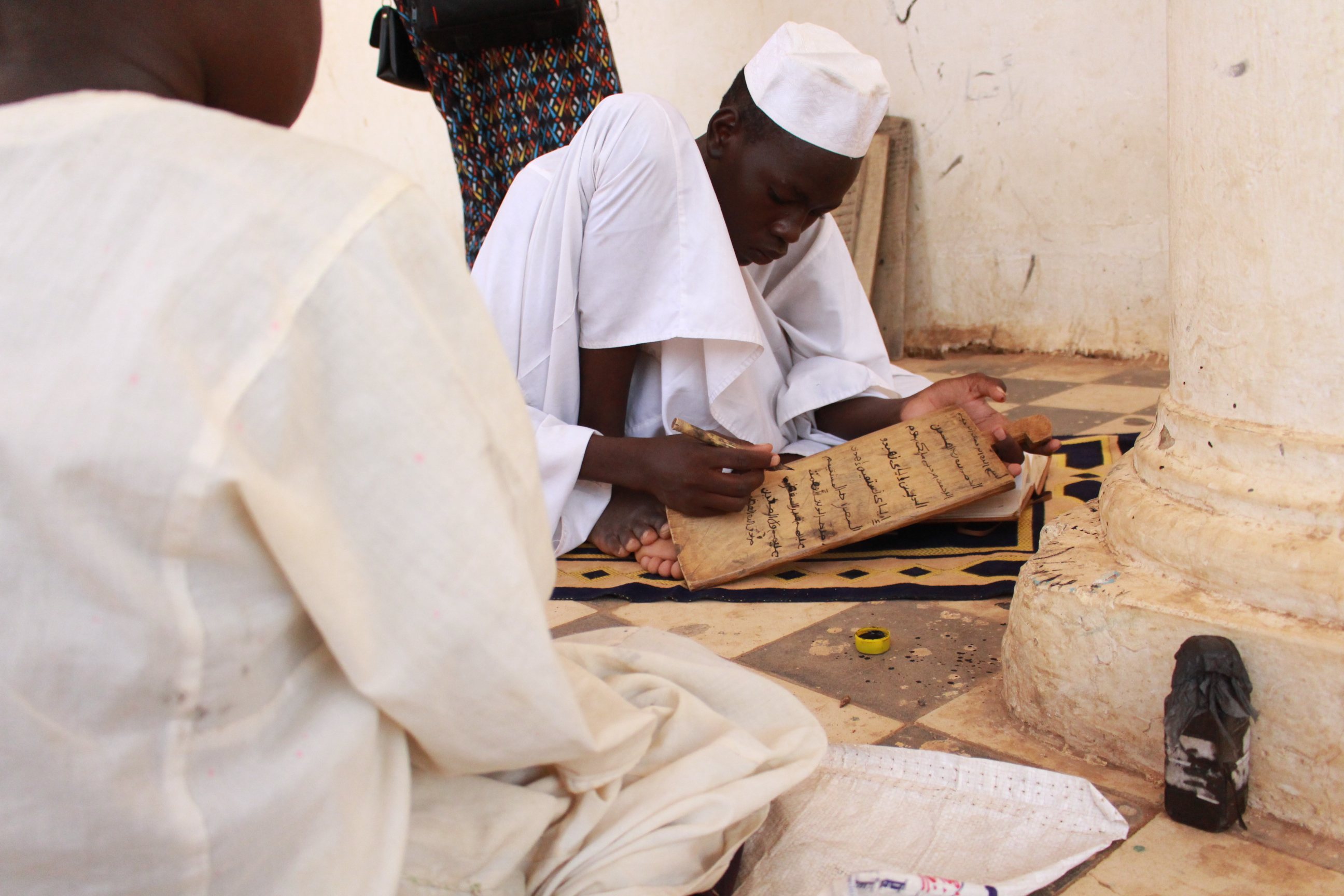
A student writing on a wooden tablet in Sudan

The student begins by writing, including drawing letters, shapes, and complete words. The students write in the soil with the tips of their fingers, without needing assistance, until the student masters the letters and reading. Then he uses a reed pen to write on his board, and the sheikh may use date stones to draw letters on the board of the student who traces it with their pen. These tools have been used since ancient times without change. All of them are from local materials the students make themselves. The board or wooden tablet on which the students write is made of wood from nearby trees. The pen used for writing is also made from local materials, the most famous of which are the stems of corn or reed trees, which are thin and hollow trees, so each student makes their own pens and puts them in a quill. The student must bring ink (called "Al-Amar"), and they use materials available in the environment but typically it is made from mixing gum arabic with coal ash. To place the building is called "dawah" or medicine, and it is often made of ceramic.

The khalwa is built from materials found locally like mud, red bricks, stones and wool. The people of the desert have theirs in tents and the shade of trees. The khalwa, in most cases, is in the form of a rectangular room that contains a small bed; they make a place to put the boards. In a far corner, a large stone called the eraser stone is placed, and it is the place where the written tablets are erased every morning to be re-written again. This stone is usually made of hard granite. The students have a special traditional outfit that corresponds to their approach to a life of austerity, which is a prominent feature for them.

=== A typical school day ===
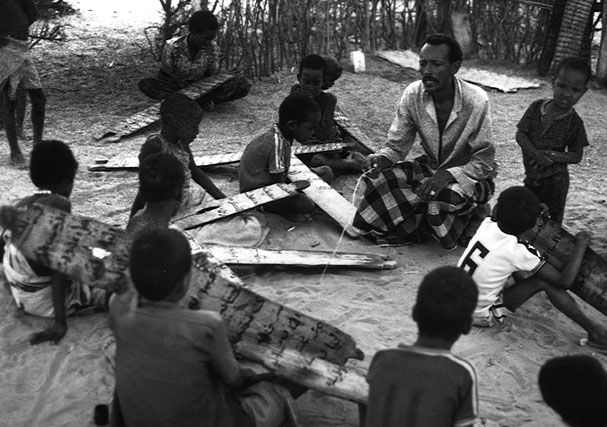
Students around sheikh in Somalia

The school day is from three-thirty in the morning to ten in the evening. The day begins with a period called the “Daghishah,” before the Fajr prayer, during which each student memorises the Koranic verses in his individual schedule. The sheikh determines the schedule for each student separately, according to his motivation and intelligence.

The drilling (known as "shooting" or Al-Rumiyah, Arabic: الرميه) starts after the Fajr prayer: after the sheikh takes his place at sunrise, and the students sit as they would for the tashahhud in prayer, but in a circle around the sheik.

A student recites the last verse he memorised the previous day, then the sheikh will recite the following verse to the student. The student starts writing that on his board, and the sheikh drills a different student. This drilling continues and is repeated until the sheikh commands the student to step to one side and proceed to memorise what was written. The students drilled by the sheik are often among the best and most efficient, and are entrusted with drilling younger and less accomplished students.

The period from sunrise to 10:30 is called "the dawn", during which each student works individually to review what he memorised the previous day, then he presents what he wrote that morning during the "shooting" to the sheikh to correct his mistakes, and this correction is known as "the health of the pen."

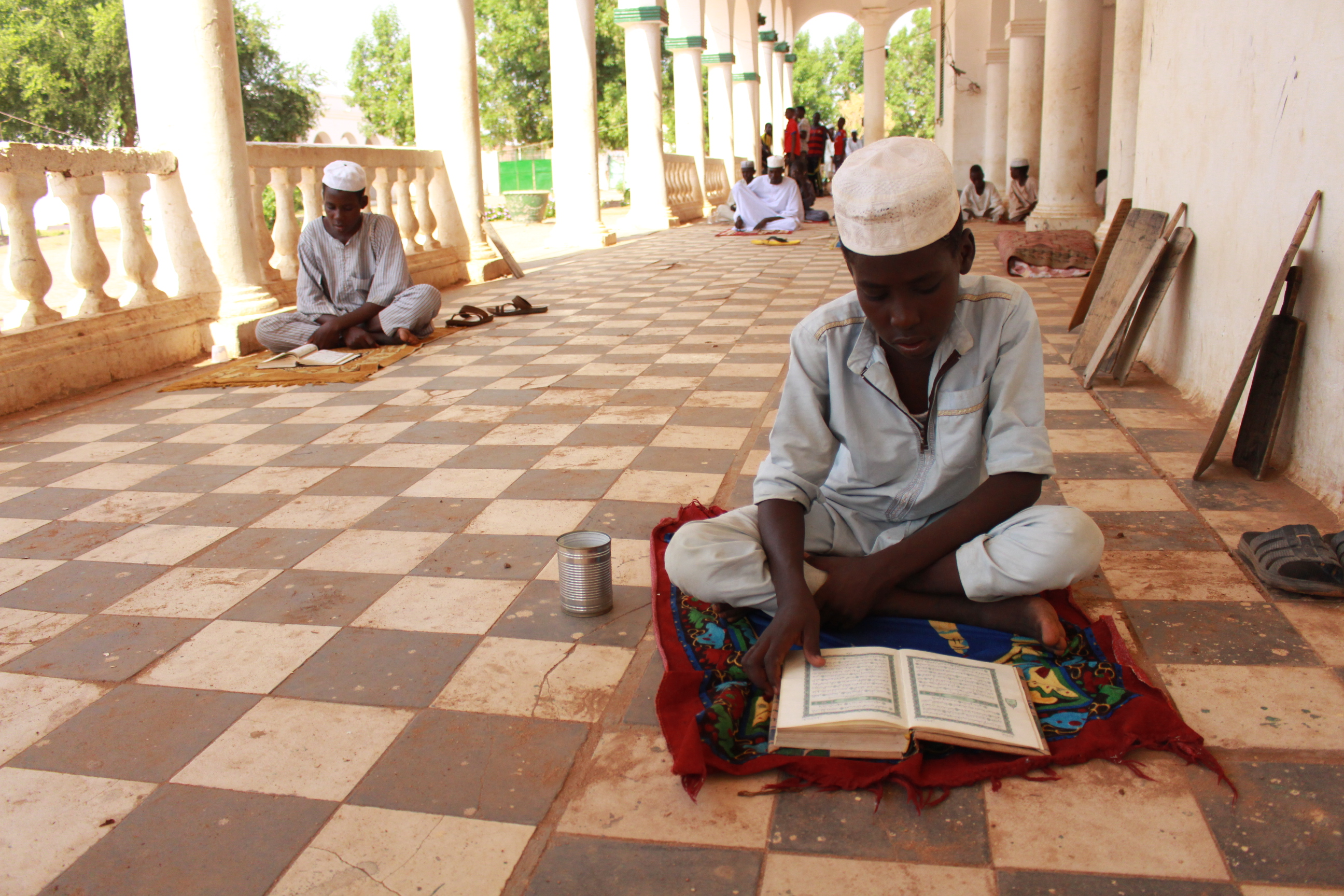
Students during the noon session in Sudan

Then the students are dismissed from eleven until two, during which the students eat breakfast and rest until the noon prayer. After the prayer, the "noon period" begins, in which the student reads to the sheikh what was written on the board during the "shooting", correcting his reading, pronunciation and intonation, and this correction is known as "oral hygiene".

After the afternoon prayer, the period of "reading" begins, in which the sheikh reads and follows the student from his wooden tablet and ends just before sunset.

After the sunset prayer, the student presents to the sheikh what he memorised yesterday, and it is called "al-Ardah" or "the exhibit". After evening prayer until ten, the student recites from memory seven parts, and it is called "the Seven," done in the old days around fire called "Al-Taqabah". This program does not stop except during the Eid al-Fitr and Eid al-Adha holidays, which is the only leave that the khalwa knows.

Saturday is typically devoted to reading, reviewing, and checking the conditions of students. Sunday for serious study. Mondays are dedicated to bringing firewood to light a fire at night, or "Al-Taqabah", and it is called the day of Al-Fazaa. On Tuesday, the Amar (ink) is made. On Wednesday, the process of accepting new students takes place, exams are held, food (or alms) of grains, dates, or money are distributed. Wednesday is considered the happiest day of solitude and the most active one. Thursday is devoted to hygiene, and the rest of the day is a holiday. Friday is a holiday.

=== Graduation ===
Traditionally, there are no graduation ceremonies and no system for moving from one class to another or from one stage to another, as is the case in regular schools. In khalwa, there is what is known as "shurafa," which is a celebration of the student's completion of a specific part of the Qur'an. For example, the first shurafa is "Shurafa Amma", and it is upon the student's memorising until Surat Al-Naba'. The second shurafa, which is "Blessed Sharafah", is given upon reaching Surat Al-Mulk, and so on until the student reaches the final shurafa upon reaching Surat Al-Baqarah. This is not dependent on a specific period of time, and each student advances from one surah to the next and from one part to the next according to his ability. Memorising the whole Qur'an typically takes three years.

One venerable custom is to decorate the student's wooden tablet by drawing a dome and a minaret of a mosque and colouring it in bright colours, and writing on it in calligraphy the first verses of the surah the student recited. On the day after this honour, someone carries the student's board and takes it to the market, showing it to the people, as the student moves from one shop to another, and people give him gifts. However, this is not a common habit.

The student's family may organise a feast. The honour feast may be accompanied by a gift from the student's family to the sheikh, and the value of the gift depends on several factors, including the economic situation of the student's family and the degree that the student has reached in memorising the Qur'an. The value of the gift increases as the student advances in memorising the Qur'an.

== Child abuse allegations ==
In 2015, the director of the Safe Child organisation, Siddiqa Kubaida, alleged that two children were raped in two khalawi in Khartoum North and Shambat, by two sheikhs. The organisation drew attention to the death of one child after the incident, and the suffering of the other.

In 2016, in an interview with Al-Araby Al-Jadeed, Sheikh Fadlallah Muhammad Zain, one of the graduates of the khalwa system, acknowledged that flogging is the most widespread punishment for kids who do not memorise their daily course from the Qur'an. When he was asked about chaining students, Zain said "In our khalwa, I witnessed this kind of punishment once, but the irony is that the one who took the responsibility of tying the child with iron chains was not the sheikh, but the father of the child, and he did that of his own free will, desiring that his child complete memorising the Holy Qur'an".

In 2020, a BBC report about khalawi, shocked many, inside or outside Sudan, due to the painful scenes of violence and ill-treatment of students. The BBC Arabic investigation, revealed that children, under the age of five, were subjected to systematic abuse, including being chained, whipped, shackled, forced to sleep naked on extremely hot iron surfaces, and confinement in dark rooms, with deprivation of food and drink, and sexual assault. BBC Arabic conducted this investigative report in partnership with the "Arab Reporters for Investigative Journalism" network. It included secret filming inside 23 khalawi, over 18 months in Sudan. By December 2020, the film had led to a major public reaction in Sudan, with legislative changes and governmental promises of prosecutions. However, a follow-up report by the BBC in December 2020 found the government had been slow to respond, and there had been little real change.

In 2022, 15 new rape cases were reported in a khalwa in North Darfur. The cases came to light after an investigation of a different case that involved more than 20 children. The journalistic investigation indicated that families of victims are generally afraid to report incidents of sexual and physical abuse, as most sheikhs are well respected and feared in the community. In the same year, the rape of 10 children by a sheikh in a khalwa in western Sudan was reported by Al-Arabia. The sheikh was sentenced to 15 years for sexual harassment and harm, and not rape or pedophilia, which was criticised by lawyers and children's rights experts.

Yasser Moussa, a mental health specialist and expert in the field of children's rights, believes that Al-Khalawi in its current form perpetuates a vicious cycle of child abuse, because most of the students depend on sheikhs who are also a khalwa graduate that may have gone through similar physical or sexual abuse, which make them have more ability to apply the same practices they were exposed to during their childhood. Another psychiatric consultant indicated that what is revealed of sexual abuse does not equal one percent of the crimes committed. Political analyst Huthaifa Al-Jallad said: “Through my direct and personal observations of one of the khalawi near my house; I noticed that the sheikh sends his children to modern schools, while he exploits his students in work inside the khalwa, perform various household chores inside the sheikh house, and bringing alms. This sheikh (like many) is a charlatan that is often visited by women and some men seeking sorcery".

The living conditions at the khalwa were assessed, and the findings indicate that infectious diseases are common among khalwa students, and their living environment facilitates the transmission of these diseases. Stool examination results showed that a percentage of students had worms, ova, and red blood cells in their stools, along with splenomegaly, hepatomegaly, infectious conjunctivitis, trachoma, anaemia and malaria.

== Notable alumni ==
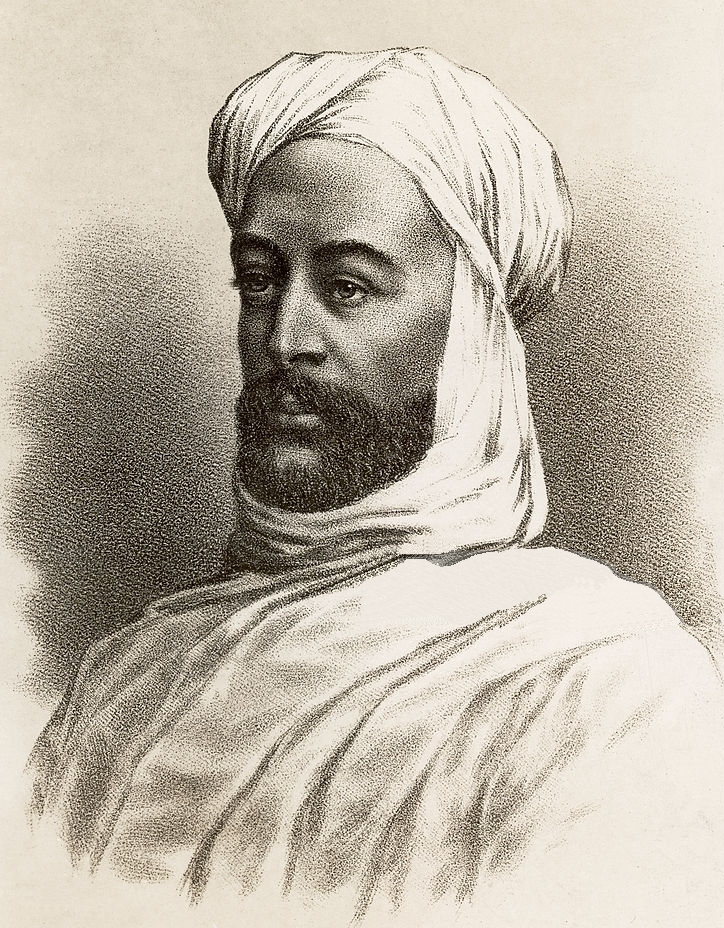
Al-Mahdi

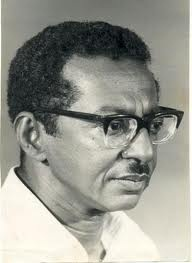
Muhammad al-Mahdi al-Majdhub

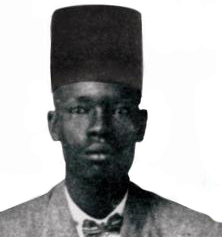
Ali Abd al Latif

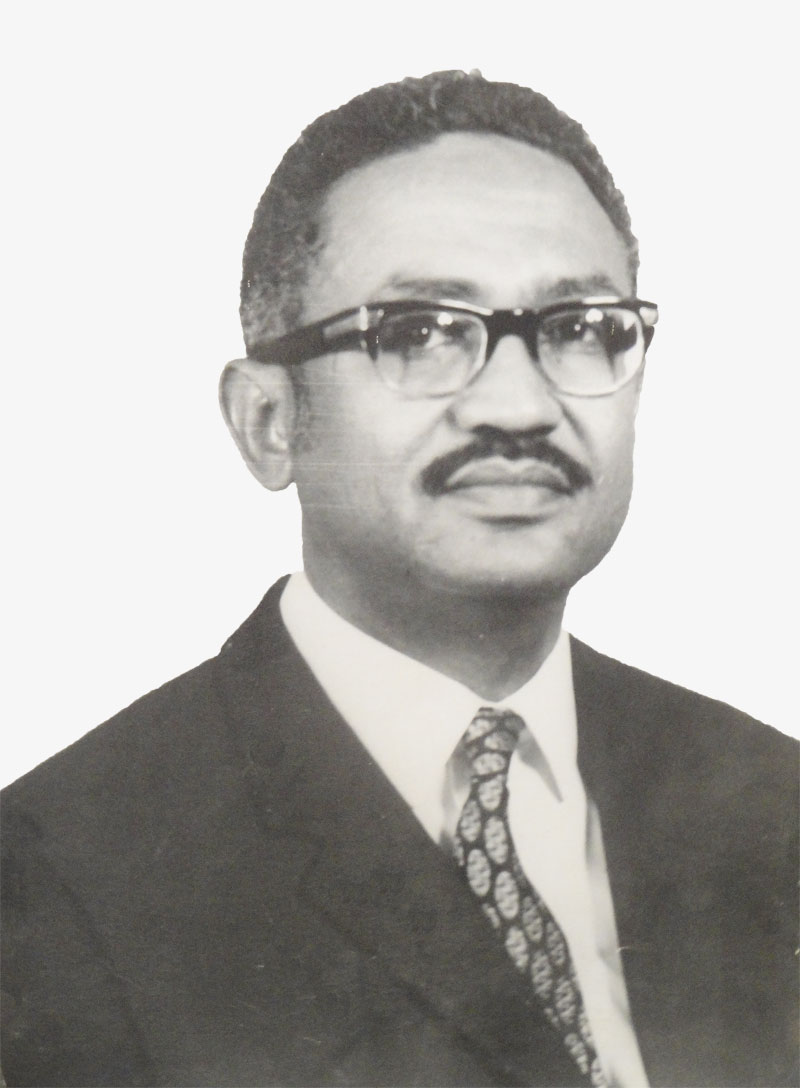
Ahmed Mohamed El Hassan

- Muhammad Ahmad Al-Mahdi (1844–1885) was a Nubian Sufi religious leader of the Samaniyya order in Sudan who claimed to be the Mahdi, and led a successful war against Ottoman-Egyptian military rule in Sudan and achieved a remarkable victory over the British, in the siege of Khartoum.
- Khalil Farah (1894–1932) was a Sudanese singer, composer and poet, who is considered one of the most prominent pioneers of the early 20th century renewal in singing and poetry in Sudan.
- Ali Abd al-Latif (1896–1948) was a prominent Sudanese nationalist who served as a key member of the White Flag League and played a prominent role in the 1924 Khartoum revolt.
- Abdel Halim Mohamed (1910–2009) who was one of the founders of the Confederation of African Football and served as the third president of the Confederation of African Football from 1968 to 1972 and 1987 to 1988.
- Al-Tijani Yusuf Bashir (1912–1937) who was a Sudanese poet who died from tuberculosis at the age of 25; his work only became widely known after his death.
- Daoud Mustafa Khalid (1917–2008) was a prominent Sudanese physician and neurologist, and the "founding father of medicine in Sudan''.
- Muhammad al-Mahdi al-Majdhub (1919–1982) was a renowned Sudanese poet widely recognised as one of the pioneers in Sudanese poetry. He is credited with being one of the first poets of Sudanese Arabic poetry and "Sudanism".
- Abdullahi Mohammad Ahmad Hassan (1928–2022) was a veteran Sudanese politician who was a member of parliament, a government minister and diplomat.
- Ahmed Mohamed El Hassan (1930–2022) was a prominent Sudanese professor of pathology.
- Salah ibn Al Badiya (1937–2019) was a Sudanese singer, composer and actor.

== See also ==
- Talibe
- Marabout
- Child abuse in Quranic schools
