= Al Matammah District (Sudan) =

Al Matammah
- District
- Country: Sudan
- State: River Nile

Al Matammah is a district of River Nile state, Sudan.
