= Umbukole =

Umbukole أم بكول
- Town
- Location of Umbukole in Sudan
- Coordinates: 18°04′09″N 31°31′24″E
- Country: Sudan
- State: Northern
- Time zone: UTC+2 (CAT)

Umbukole (Arabic: أم بكول) is a small capital city in a northern state in Kurti county, Sudan. It is now mostly remembered as the name of a small district in Atbarah.

== See also ==
- List of cities in Sudan
