= Child abuse in Quranic schools =

Abuse of children in schools

Child abuse in elementary Quranic schools, known in some regions as madrassas or khalwa, is a concerning issue that has been reported in various regions. Several cases of violent corporal punishment, child labour, child sexual abuse and physical abuse have been documented of children attending madrassas. Activists and organisations have worked to expose cases of child abuse and call for action against the perpetrators. The United Nations Children's Fund (UNICEF) has engaged religious and traditional leaders, as well as government and civil society, in efforts to protect children from various forms of abuse, including child marriage, violent corporal punishment, domestic abuse, and child labour.

== Overview ==
=== Definition ===
Child abuse refers to the physical, sexual, and/ or psychological maltreatment or neglect of a child or children, particularly by a parent or caregiver. It may include any act or failure to act by a caregiver or parent that results in harm, actual or potential, to a child and can occur in a child's home, organisations, schools, or community. Child abuse can take various forms, including physical abuse, sexual abuse, emotional abuse, and neglect.

Different professionals, social and cultural groups, and even different time periods have varying definitions of what constitutes child abuse. Abuse and maltreatment are often used interchangeably, and child maltreatment can be an umbrella term that covers all forms of child abuse and neglect. The definition of child maltreatment depends on cultural values related to children, child development, and parenting. Definitions of child maltreatment can vary among different sectors of society that deal with the issue, such as child protection agencies, legal and medical communities, public health officials, researchers, practitioners, and child advocates.

Abuse usually refers to deliberate acts of commission, while neglect refers to acts of omission. Child maltreatment includes both acts of commission and acts of omission by parents or caregivers that cause actual or threatened harm to a child. Some health professionals and authors consider neglect as part of the definition of abuse, while others do not. Delayed effects of child abuse and neglect, especially emotional neglect, and the diversity of acts that qualify as child abuse are also factors.

=== Prevalence ===
Research indicates that child maltreatment, including physical, emotional, and sexual abuse, is a significant concern across various educational environments, including madrasas. For instance, studies have shown that children in religious educational settings may face unique vulnerabilities due to the authoritative nature of these institutions and the potential for abuse of power by educators or caregivers. The lack of oversight and accountability in some madrasas can exacerbate the risk of maltreatment, as children may be less likely to report abuse due to fear of repercussions or a lack of understanding of their rights.

Moreover, the prevalence of child abuse in madrasas can be influenced by broader societal factors, such as poverty, parental education levels, and community norms. For example, research has demonstrated that children from low-income families or those with less educated parents are at a higher risk of experiencing maltreatment. This correlation suggests that socio-economic status plays a crucial role in the prevalence of child abuse, including within madrasas, where financial constraints may limit the resources available for child protection and welfare.

Additionally, the cultural context surrounding child-rearing practices in certain communities may contribute to the normalization of abusive behaviours. In some cases, physical punishment is viewed as an acceptable form of discipline, which can lead to higher rates of physical abuse in educational settings, including madrasas. This cultural acceptance of harsh disciplinary measures can create an environment where abuse is overlooked or justified, further complicating efforts to address maltreatment in these institutions.

== By country ==
=== Bangladesh ===
Qawmi madrasas operate independently of the Bangladesh Madrasah Education Board, leading to challenges in monitoring and regulating these institutions. This autonomy can result in inadequate supervision and accountability, potentially contributing to abuse. Reports indicate that corporal punishment is prevalent in some Qawmi madrasas. A survey by the Bangladesh Bureau of Statistics and UNICEF found that over 80% of children aged 1–14 experienced violent punishment, with madrasa students particularly affected.

In 2021, approximately 30 incidents of sexual violence in Qawmi madrasas were reported in the media. In 2020, 25 such incidents were reported in November and December alone. These cases often involve teachers exploiting their authority over students.

=== Benin ===
Some Quranic teachers exploit children by forcing them into begging, a practice that constitutes a form of child trafficking. The Committee on the Rights of the Child reviewed Benin's combined third to fifth periodic report on implementing the Convention on the Rights of the Child. Benin highlighted progress in health and education, and measures to combat domestic violence, child labor, and exploitation. However, concerns were raised about the lack of implementation of policies, ritual killings, harmful practices against girls, and insufficient resources for child protection. The Committee emphasized the need for better enforcement of laws and increased awareness of children's rights.

A UN expert, Najat Maalla M’jid, highlighted the alarming levels of child abuse, violence, and exploitation in Benin. During her visit, she found that many children suffer from various forms of abuse, including infanticide, female genital mutilation, forced marriages, and sexual exploitation. The abuse is often justified by traditions and customs, and perpetrators frequently enjoy impunity. Despite having a legal framework for child protection, Benin struggles with implementation due to corruption and lack of resources. The expert urged the government to prioritize child protection and called for a comprehensive strategy to address these issues.

=== Brunei ===
Brunei's Education (School Discipline) Regulations 2004 permit corporal punishment in schools. The Syariah Penal Code 2013 includes provisions that allow acts "done in good faith for the benefit of a person who is not baligh [attained puberty] by guardians or others having lawful charge of the child". This has raised concerns about the potential for justifying corporal punishment under the guise of discipline.

=== Egypt ===
Reports indicate that child abuse, including corporal punishment, occurs in various educational settings in Egypt, including Quranic schools. A 2010 article highlighted that student beating is endemic across Egypt's educational system, with instances of severe punishment leading to serious injuries and even fatalities. For example, a student in Alexandria was fatally punched for not completing homework, and another had his arm broken by a teacher for failing to solve an equation.

=== France ===
In Marseille, a Quranic school faced allegations of child abuse when several students reported instances of physical punishment and neglect. Investigations revealed that the institution lacked proper oversight, allowing such abuses to occur unchecked. In 2018, a Quranic teacher in Aubervilliers, a suburb of Paris, was arrested for physically abusing students. The teacher was accused of administering severe corporal punishment under the guise of discipline, leading to significant physical and psychological harm to the children involved.

India

Child sexual abuse have been so much widespread in the Indian state of Kerala so that it no longer make any news

=== Indonesia ===
In November 2024, the headmaster of Pondok Pesantren Sri Muslim Mardhatillah in Jambi city was arrested for allegedly sexually abusing at least 12 students over two years. Investigations revealed that the school lacked proper licensing to operate as a religious educational institution.

=== Iran ===
In 2016, a Quran teacher, Saeed Tousi, accused of molesting and raping children, even within the home of Supreme Leader Ali Khamenei. Additionally, a former Iranian Football Federation official revealed that at least 10 young players were raped by a club president. These incidents have sparked widespread condemnation and highlighted the lack of sufficient legal measures to deter such crimes.

=== Kuwait ===
An Egyptian Islamic education teacher in Kuwait was arrested for allegedly sexually assaulting six children, causing widespread outrage on social media. The arrest followed a complaint by a Pakistani father about his 8-year-old son being assaulted. The teacher, who has been in Kuwait for nine years, was charged with sexual assault by threatening children in the Farwaniya and Khaitan areas. All victims were expatriates, aged between 7 and 12. The teacher confessed to luring and assaulting children.

=== Malaysia ===
In September 2024, Malaysian authorities arrested Nasiruddin Mohd Ali, CEO of Global Ikhwan Services and Business (GISB) Holdings, along with other senior managers, amid allegations of operating charity homes where children were sexually abused. Early morning raids across Kuala Lumpur led to the detention of 18 individuals, with five others apprehended at the Thai border. The case involves over 400 children rescued from GISB-run shelters, many showing signs of abuse and neglect. Additionally, three men were charged with sexually assaulting boys in a religious school. GISB, associated with the banned Al-Arqam sect, is also under investigation for money laundering and religious offenses.

In a related incident, the imam of a surau (Muslim prayer hall) in Bukit Beruntung, Malaysia, expressed shock upon learning about the abuse allegations linked to GISB. The imam emphasized the need for vigilance to prevent such incidents within religious institutions.

=== Mauritania ===
Talibé children often live in harsh conditions, relying on begging to provide money and food for their marabout. They typically do not receive meals or clothing from the marabout and sleep in basic accommodations. About 50.9% of the surveyed children reported being physically abused by their marabout, often due to not bringing in enough money from begging or failing to learn their lessons properly.

=== New Zealand ===
A recent Royal Commission of Inquiry revealed that approximately 200,000 children, young people, and vulnerable adults experienced abuse in state and faith-based care between 1950 and 2019. This abuse occurred across various institutions, including religious schools and care facilities.

=== Nigeria ===
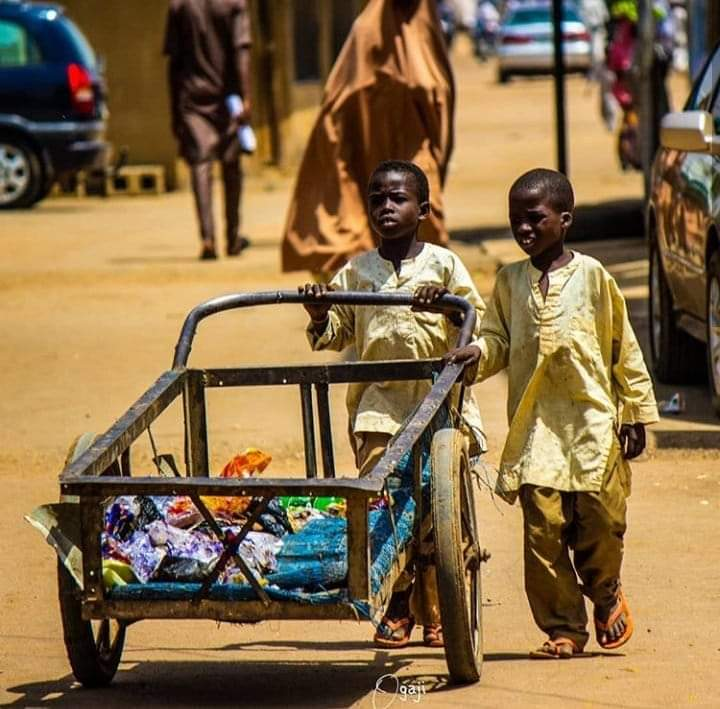
Almajirai on a labour work

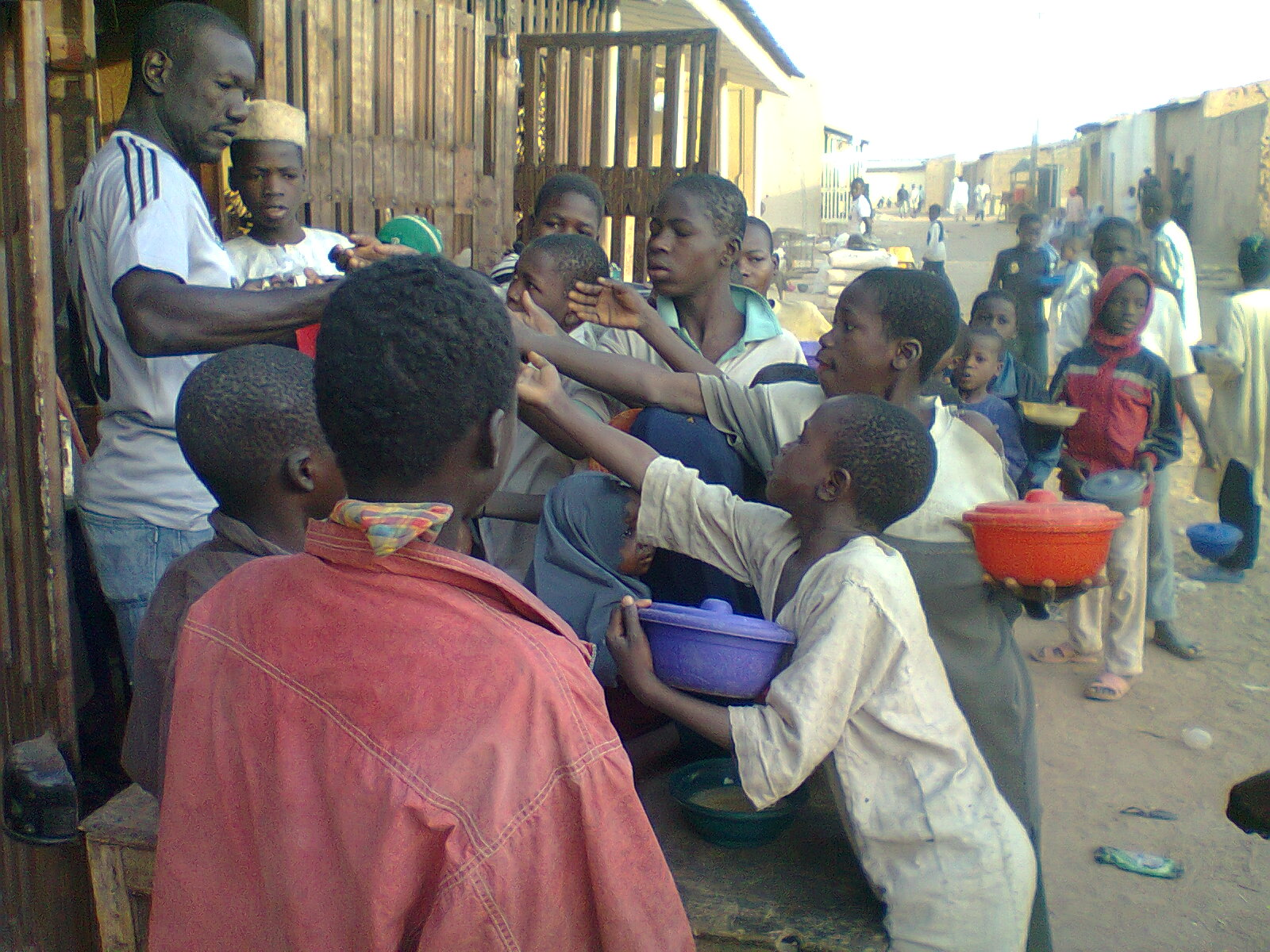
Almajirai collecting food in a street in Katsina, Katsina State, Nigeria

The almajiri system has been highly controversial in Nigeria. Some believe that the almajiri system was originally good, but has since deteriorated. Critics say that the almajiri system promotes poverty and neglects, abuses, and exploits young boys, who wear tattered clothing, beg for food on the streets, and work for free. In one study of almajirai in the Kaduna state, 38% of boys surveyed said they were tired all the time, and 62% reported feeling hungry. In the same study, 88% of almajirai said they spend most of their time begging. Some Muslims criticize this practice, as begging is generally discouraged in Islam. Moreover, the conditions that almajirai live in are often unhygienic and not conducive to their health.

The almajiri system is often attacked for promoting youth delinquency and violence and for providing street gangs and Boko Haram with an ample supply of vulnerable young recruits. People believe that the almajiri system fuels Boko Haram because 1) the children are radically indoctrinated and manipulated by their Quranic teachers and 2) the children are economically disadvantaged and live without their parents, which makes them easy targets for recruitment. Some say that Boko Haram would not exist with almajirai, while others say there's no evidence that Boko Haram recruits from almajirai systematically more than they recruit from any other vulnerable youth demographic in Nigeria. A recent study involving interviews with scholars whose works have associated the Almajirai with terrorism found no evidence supporting the extremism discourse other than hypothetical worst-case scenarios based on an economic deprivation thesis, which contributes to securitisation of the Almajirai.

Additionally, since the almajirai do not receive a secular education (math, science, English, etc.), they are often unequipped for professional jobs.

Because almajirai beg on the streets and are seen by some as unproductive to society, the children face widespread stigmatization: some consider them to be "the butchers of Nigeria,” "urchins" and "nuisances."

=== Pakistan ===
A 2017 Associated Press investigation found that sexual abuse is a widespread problem in Pakistan's Islamic schools, with thousands of incidents reported. In 2021, a high-profile case in Lahore highlighted ongoing issues, where a madrassa student accused a prominent religious leader of sexual abuse. Investigations and police reports have uncovered allegations of sexual harassment, rape, and physical abuse by Islamic clerics teaching at madrassas. There have been calls for reform and action against the perpetration of abuse.

=== Saudi Arabia ===
A systematic literature review identified 15 studies conducted between 1998 and 2016, revealing that physical abuse of children is more widespread and severe in the Kingdom than previously acknowledged.

=== Senegal ===
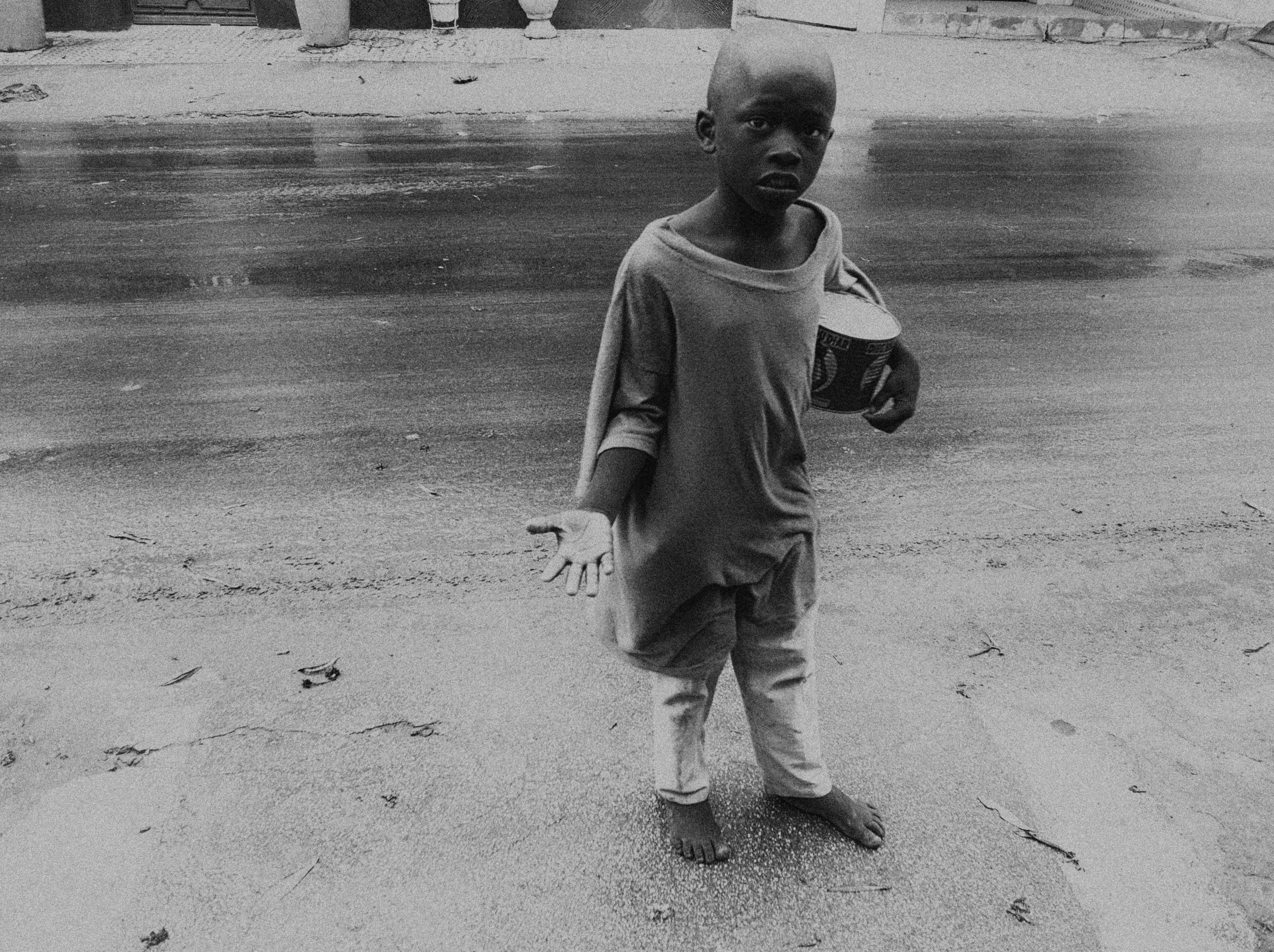
A begging talibé

Begging used to be characterised by the talibé asking for food to supplement the daara's supplies when it could not sustain its own demands from the harvests provided by the marabout's fields. The increasing number of daaras in urban settings has stemmed the traditional forms of support that sustained daaras. The prevalence of almsgiving in Senegalese society has made child begging profitable in cities. In the 1970s, some urban daaras ran seasonally, allowing for marabouts to return to their villages for the harvest. However, it became more economically viable for urban daaras to remain open all year round:

Over time, the marabouts started to stay in the cities…Why return to the village, where they had to work the land for long hours, when [in the city] a child comes daily with money, sugar, and rice?

Perry warns that the above view can imply that only urban daaras exploit talibés. She contends that urban and rural daaras “are the same. There is just one difference: the urban talibe’s ‘farm’ is the urban street, and [the] ‘crop’ he harvests is cash, and not peanuts.”

The practice of marabouts taking on talibés is seldom subject to state regulation, making it easier for abuse of this relationship to occur. The Senegalese government has recently created state-regulated daaras in order to reduce abuses. However, urban daaras with resident talibés form the most common form of Quranic schools.

Some marabouts, instead of teaching their talibés about the Quran, exploit them for labour, typically through forced begging on the streets. The nature of this exploitation exposes such talibés to disease, injury, death, physical abuse and sexual abuse.

A 2007 UNICEF study of child begging in Dakar, the capital of Senegal, found that "the large majority of child beggars (90%) are talibés". UNICEF has estimated there to be between 50,000 and 100,000 begging talibés in Senegal. A 2010 report suggests that the number of talibés is on the rise. Other researchers, however, warn that "estimates on the numbers of street children rest upon largely elastic and nebulous definitions." Indeed, there are no official statistics to substantiate these claims. Others respond that the rise of Arabic-maderas is causing the number of talibés to decline.

Human Rights Watch (HRW) has warned that the social status enjoyed by marabouts has emboldened "those responsible for the proliferation of forced child begging and other abuses committed by the marabouts against talibé children." Perry cautiously agrees that "reverence of marabouts and respect for the talibé institution may be a dominant ideology, but it is not now, nor ever was, totalising or uncontested".

Platform for the Promotion and Protection of Human Rights (PPDH) along with HRW, reported in December 2019 the overlooked abuse, exploitation and neglect of thousands of talibé children at traditional Quranic schools. The Senegalese government was accused of neglecting and not doing enough to tackle the widespread and chronic abuse faced by children at the religious schools.

The United Nations' Convention on the Rights of the Child (CRC) creates rights to adequate living standards for children, with regard to the means of the primary caregivers, as well as the means of the state to support the primary caregivers. HRW argues that states, parents and marabouts are in breach of CRC in failing to oversee the adequate housing, care and nourishment of talibés.

HRW also cites the following as other abuses of talibés which breach CRC.

- Forced begging; HRW argues that this exposes talibés to considerable dangers. HRW documented cases of talibés dying in car accidents while trying to beg on the streets. The exposure to dangerous work, HRW argues, not only threatens the physical and mental security of talibés, but their lives.
- Corporal punishment; physical punishments in schools has been described by the UN Committee on the Rights of the Child, as a type of violence which CRC seeks to stop.
- Education; HRW argues that, where a child's education is almost entirely neglected due to copious hours of begging, this may amount to a breach of CRC.
- Sexual abuse; CRC requires states to take steps to protect children from sexual abuse.
- Leisure; where a marabout denies talibés leisure time, this may breach the child's right “to rest and leisure.”

=== Sudan ===
In 2015, the director of the Safe Child organisation, Siddiqa Kubaida, alleged that two children were raped in two khalawi in Khartoum North and Shambat, by two sheikhs. The organisation drew attention to the death of one child after the incident, and the suffering of the other.

In 2016, in an interview with Al-Araby Al-Jadeed, Sheikh Fadlallah Muhammad Zain, one of the graduates of the khalwa system, acknowledged that flogging is the most widespread punishment for kids who do not memorise their daily course from the Qur'an. When he was asked about chaining students, Zain said "In our khalwa, I witnessed this kind of punishment once, but the irony is that the one who took the responsibility of tying the child with iron chains was not the sheikh, but the father of the child, and he did that of his own free will, desiring that his child complete memorising the Holy Qur'an".

In 2020, a BBC report about khalawi, shocked many, inside or outside Sudan, due to the painful scenes of violence and ill-treatment of students. The BBC Arabic investigation, revealed that children, under the age of five, were subjected to systematic abuse, including being chained, whipped, shackled, forced to sleep naked on extremely hot iron surfaces, and confinement in dark rooms, with deprivation of food and drink, and sexual assault. BBC Arabic conducted this investigative report in partnership with the "Arab Reporters for Investigative Journalism" network. It included secret filming inside 23 khalawi, over 18 months in Sudan. By December 2020, the film had led to a major public reaction in Sudan, with legislative changes and governmental promises of prosecutions. However, a follow-up report by the BBC in December 2020 found the government had been slow to respond, and there had been little real change.

In 2022, 15 new rape cases were reported in a khalwa in North Darfur. The cases came to light after an investigation of a different case that involved more than 20 children. The journalistic investigation indicated that families of victims are generally afraid to report incidents of sexual and physical abuse, as most sheikhs are well respected and feared in the community. In the same year, the rape of 10 children by a sheikh in a khalwa in western Sudan was reported by Al-Arabia. The sheikh was sentenced to 15 years for sexual harassment and harm, and not rape or pedophilia, which was criticised by lawyers and children's rights experts.

Yasser Moussa, a mental health specialist and expert in the field of children's rights, believes that Al-Khalawi in its current form perpetuates a vicious cycle of child abuse, because most of the students depend on sheikhs who are also a khalwa graduate that may have gone through similar physical or sexual abuse, which make them have more ability to apply the same practices they were exposed to during their childhood. Another psychiatric consultant indicated that what is revealed of sexual abuse does not equal one percent of the crimes committed. Political analyst Huthaifa Al-Jallad said: “Through my direct and personal observations of one of the khalawi near my house; I noticed that the sheikh sends his children to modern schools, while he exploits his students in work inside the khalwa, perform various household chores inside the sheikh house, and bringing alms. This sheikh (like many) is a charlatan that is often visited by women and some men seeking sorcery".

The living conditions at the khalwa were assessed, and the findings indicate that infectious diseases are common among khalwa students, and their living environment facilitates the transmission of these diseases. Stool examination results showed that a percentage of students had worms, ova, and red blood cells in their stools, along with splenomegaly, hepatomegaly, infectious conjunctivitis, trachoma, anaemia and malaria.

=== Tunisia ===
In January 2019, Tunisian authorities raided an unlicensed Quranic school in Regueb, central Tunisia, uncovering severe child abuse and exploitation. The school housed 42 boys aged 10 to 17, who were subjected to forced labour, physical abuse, and indoctrination into extremist ideologies. Investigations revealed that nine students had been sexually abused, and the school operated without official oversight, raising concerns about child protection and the proliferation of unregulated religious institutions in Tunisia.

This incident highlighted the broader issue of child abuse within educational settings in Tunisia. In March 2019, authorities investigated the sexual abuse of 20 children by a teacher in a public school, underscoring systemic challenges in safeguarding children from abuse.

Despite legal reforms aimed at protecting children, such as Tunisia becoming the first non-member state to sign the Council of Europe's convention against child sexual abuse in October 2019, these cases indicate ongoing challenges in effectively implementing child protection measures.

=== Turkey ===
In 2016, in Karaman, a 54-year-old teacher was accused of sexually abusing 10 children in guesthouses allegedly run illegally by two Islamic foundations, including the Ensar Foundation, which has close ties to the Turkish government.

In 2018, a religious official from the Diyanet (Turkey's Directorate of Religious Affairs) was accused of abusing two girls attending a Quran course.

In 2020, Sheik Fatih Nurullah, leader of the Uşşaki Islamic cult, was arrested for sexually abusing a 12-year-old girl.

=== United Kingdom ===
A BBC investigation uncovered over 400 allegations of physical abuse in madrassas over a three-year period, suggesting that these cases may represent just a fraction of the actual incidents, which can be in thousands.

Local authorities have been asked to provide information on the number of cases, indicating a rise in reported incidents. Efforts have been made to address the issue, with calls for reform and improved safeguards within madrassas.

=== Uzbekistan ===
In August 2018, illegal religious schools were shut down following accusation of child abuse.

=== Yemen ===
Instances of child abuse in Quranic schools in Yemen have been documented, particularly concerning physical and emotional maltreatment. A cross-sectional study conducted in Aden governorate revealed that physical abuse is prevalent in basic-education schools, including Quranic institutions. The study highlighted that students often experience harsh corporal punishment, which can have long-term detrimental effects on their well-being and academic performance.

== See also ==
- PTSD in children and adolescents
