= Almajiranci =

System of Islamic education in northern Nigeria

Almajiranci (Hausa pronunciation) refers to a system of Islamic education practiced in northern Nigeria, the male gender seeking Islam knowledge is called Almajiri, female gender is Almajira, and the plural is Almajirai. The system encourages parents to leave parental responsibilities to the attached Islamic school. The Hausa word Almajiri is derived from the Arabic word, المُهَاجِرْ "al-Muhājir," which refers to a person who migrates from his home in search of Islamic knowledge.

Colloquially, the term has expanded to refer to any young person who begs on the streets and does not attend secular school. Many people in Hausa land give 'Sadaka' to almajirai on daily basis seeking Divine reward and protection. Almajirai are children, usually from poor rural backgrounds, who leave their hometowns to study Islamic learning with malammai, teachers of the Quran. Most malams were educated in the alamajiri system themselves, and as they do not receive a salary but depend financially on the alms of the community and the work of the almajirai. The almajirai usually begin their studies between the ages of 3 and 12, and learn about the Quran in schools called tsangayu. In their early twenties, the almajirai reach sauka, graduation, and become gardi or gardawa. When not engaged in learning the Quran, almajirai in rural areas may work on farms, while urban almajirai conduct small tasks like domestic chores, running errands, and fetching water. Some almajiri attend secular schools concurrently, or switch between secular and almajiri schools. Additionally, almajirai practice alms begging, or almajiranchi, out of necessity to eat. Almajiranchi was not originally part of the almajirai system, but it is now said to prepare the almajirai for the hardships of life, make them strong and humble, and keep them devoted to studying the Quran. The practice of alms begging is widely denounced as child abuse in Nigeria.

Approximately 8.5 million children attend Islamic schools in Northern Nigeria. There are approximately 300,000 almajirai living in the state of Kano. In a recent report during the COVID 19 lockdown, the government of Kano State revealed that it cannot take care of over 5 million alamajiri in Kano state so it has begun the process of deportation of the boys back to their various states of origin. Some other northern states also followed suit on the grounds that the boys will be easy spreaders of the dreaded coronavirus in northern Nigeria. About 69% of the 13.4 million out of school children in Nigeria are children from Northern Nigeria.

The almajiri system in Nigeria is highly controversial. The system has been attacked for promoting youth poverty and delinquency, for failing to teach young boys vocational skills and thus making them unequipped for the workforce, and for radicalizing boys and making them perfect recruits for gangs and Boko Haram. Others believe the almajiri system teaches young boys to be pious, good people who will benefit society.

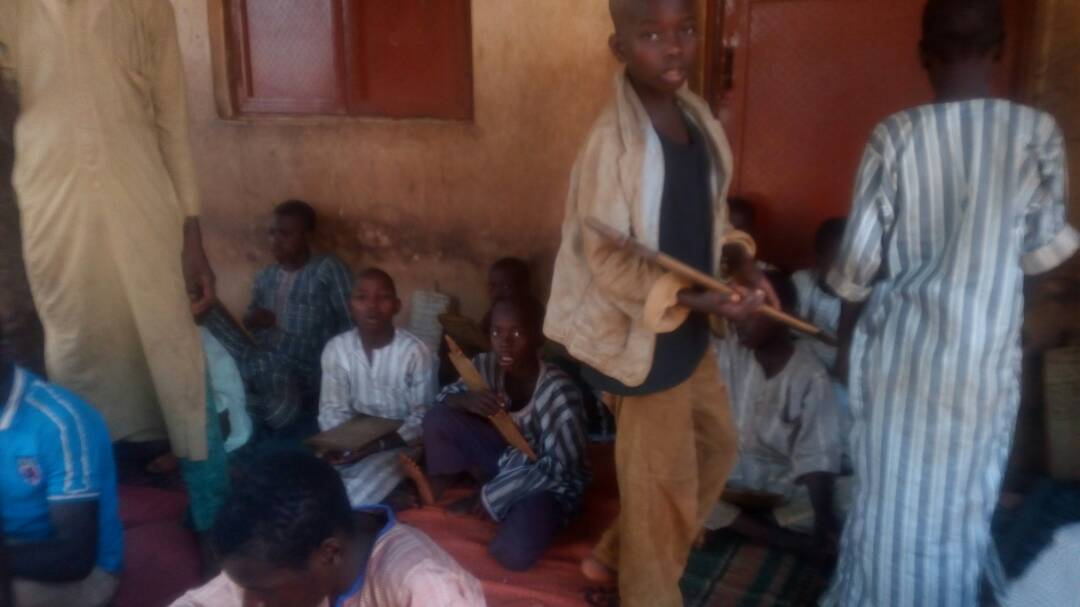
Almajirai at school in Birnin Kebbi, Kebbi State, Nigeria

== History ==
=== Precolonial era ===
Muslim traders first came to the Nigerian regions of Kanem and Borno in the 9th century, and the religion spread through trade and migration. Almajiri began in Kanem-Borno in the 11th century, when many rulers practiced Islam. More than 700 years later, in the 19th century, Islamic scholar Usman dan Fodio founded the Sokoto caliphate, and furthered the cause of Islamic learning. Prior to the British arrival in Nigeria, almajiri children stayed at home with their parents and attended tsangayu to learn about the Quran. All the schools available then were in close proximity with the immediate environment of the students. Inspectors were introduced to go to the schools and report the affairs of the school to the emir of the province. The schools were funded by the state treasury, the community, parents, zakah controlled by local emirs, sadaqqah and sometimes the farm output of the students. In the precolonial era, almajirai did not beg because there was sufficient funding to feed and clothe them.

=== Colonial era ===
The British colonized Nigeria in 1904, and with them came many changes to the almajiri system. During the colonial era, the British deposed emirs and defunded the almajiri system. The remaining emirs lost control of their territories; this resulted also in the loss of fundamental control of the almajiri. With no support from the community, emirs and government, the system collapsed. The British neither established secular schools on a large scale nor advanced existing institutions. Most Western education (Boko) was conducted by Christian missionaries, but this education was only available for a small portion of Nigerians. Because Islamic scholars did not have a western education, they were disqualified from white-collar and political jobs. One Muslim response to the establishment of Christian-led secular schools was to create integrated Muslim-led secular schools. In 1921, there were more than 30,000 Islamic schools in Northern Nigeria.

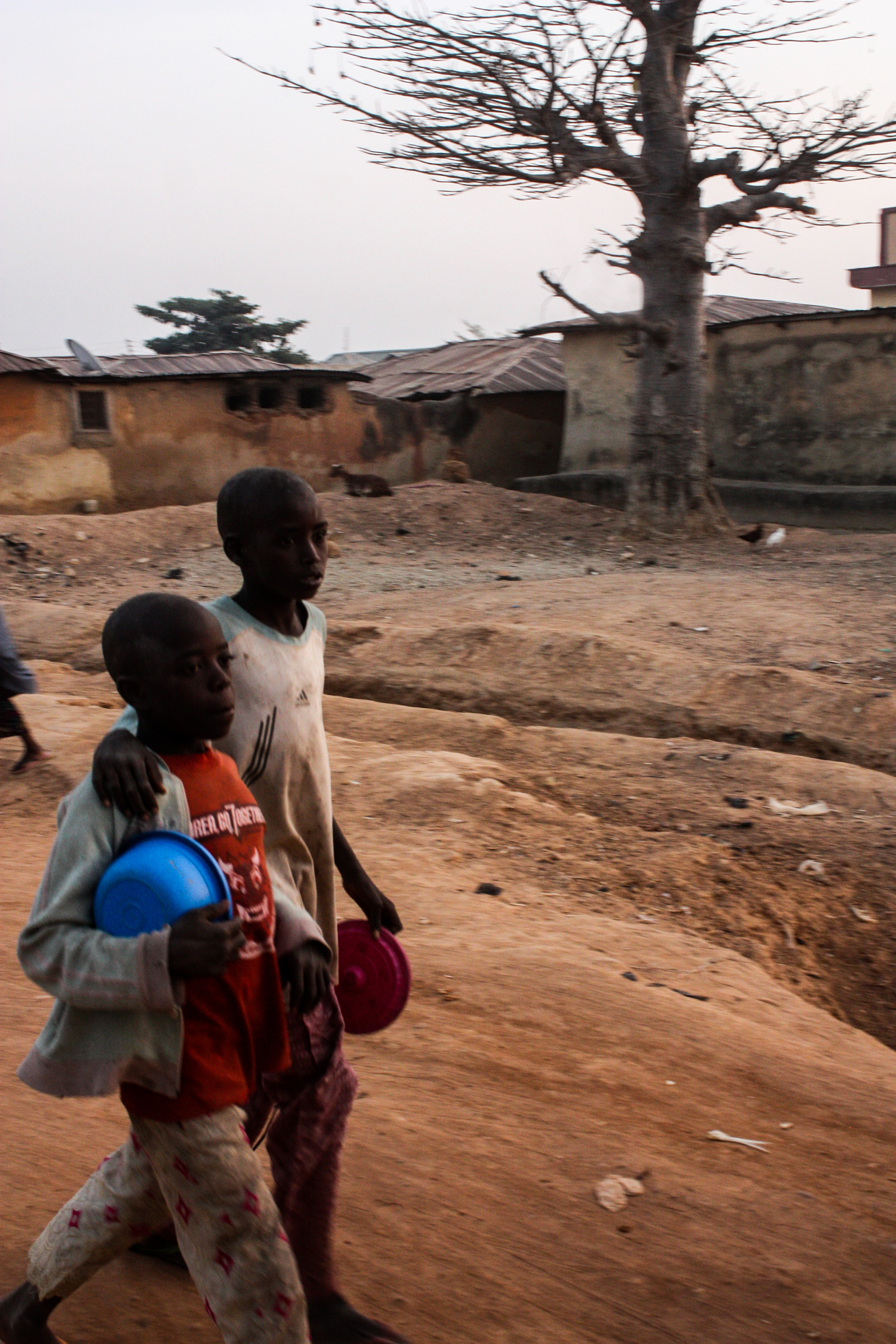
Almajirai walking in the street

The British did, however, establish large urban centers, so many malammai migrated from rural areas to the cities. Many northern cities, such as Kano, became important centers of Islamic learning. Parents started sending their children to the cities to study Islam, and the relationship between the almajiri and the malammai became more salient. The teachers and students had no financial support, so, they turned to alms begging and menial jobs for survival. Eventually this practice became the norm.

=== Post-independence era ===
The 1970's oil boom, which decreased the profitability of farming, and the 1986 Structural Adjustment Programme (SAP), which slowed economic growth, both increased poverty in Northern Nigeria and exacerbated the challenges of the almajiri system.

In 1989, the Nigerian government created the National Commission for Nomadic Education (NCNE) to improve formal and non-formal education systems (including the almajiri system) for nomadic Nigerian children. Some children come to Nigeria from neighboring countries (Chad Republic, Niger, and Sudan) to attend almajiri schools. Many Northern states made integrated Muslim/secular primary and post-primary schools.

== Contemporary government policy ==
Several Northern states, such as Adamawa state and Niger state, have started integrating the almajiri education system into existing government programs. In 2009, the states of Sokoto and Zamfara had three times as many Quranic students as students in the formal education system, which the government considered to be a serious problem. In 2010, the Nigerian Universal Basic Education (UBE) system was expanded to include the National Framework for the Development and Integration of Almajiri Education, which allocated funding to open more than one hundred almajiri schools. The schools were funded by a $98 million joint operation between the Islamic Development Bank (IDB) and the Nigerian government. The plan was intended to keep children from becoming radicalized and recruited by Boko Haram and other terrorist groups. In 2013, 124 Islamic schools had been built. However, since then, many of these schools have deteriorated.

In 2012, President Goodluck Jonathan referred to the almajiri as “dangerous to national development.” He also said that Nigeria should ensure that the almajirai receive a traditional, secular education.

In 2015, the Universal Basic Education Commission (UBEC) Almajiri Education Programme wrote that its goals were to provide the Universal Basic Education to all almajiri children, to eliminate begging, and to facilitate the integration of Islamic studies into the secular Universal Basic Education Program for Northern Nigerian children. The report emphasized that children could continue to learn the Quran, but that the Universal Basic Education program would prepare almajirai with secular knowledge and skills to "enable them integrate into the Nigerian society and ensure realization of their potentials."

In 2020, 50 out of 59 COVID-19 cases in Kaduna State were traced to almajiris who were sent back from Kano to their different States. In Jigawa State, out of 45 samples taken for COVID-19 tests from Almajiris repatriated from Kano State, 16 came back positive. The Northern States Governors' Forum perceived that the COVID-19 pandemic has set the scene for introducing drastic changes into the almajiri school system as it exposes children to the virus due to lack of hygiene, shelter and itinerant life. This has led to abolishing of the almajiri educational system by Kano State. The governor of Kano State Mr Abdullahi Umar Ganduje announced that alamajiri have been banned from the state and deportation of them will start immediately to curb covid spread. The children would be absorbed into the secular school system.

More recently, there has been an increased effort to integrate the almajiri school system into the Nigerian secular school system by the federal government of Nigeria. To address the issue, the Nigerian government established the National Commission for Almajiri and Out of School Children Education (NCAOOSCE) following a bill assented to by President Muhammadu Buhari on 27 May 2023.

In March 2024, President Bola Tinubu appointed Brigadier-General Lawal Ja'afar Isa (Rtd) as board chairman and Dr. Idris Muhammad Sani as executive secretary of the commission. By December 2025, the commission had established 119 learning centres across the country using an Accelerated Basic Education Programme curriculum and developed a National Policy on Almajiri Education to integrate formal literacy, numeracy, and vocational training into traditional Tsangaya schools. Despite the establishment of the commission and its initial institutional rollouts, the long-term efficacy of these measures in resolving the Almajiri and out of school children crisis remains an object of ongoing assessment.

== Criticism ==
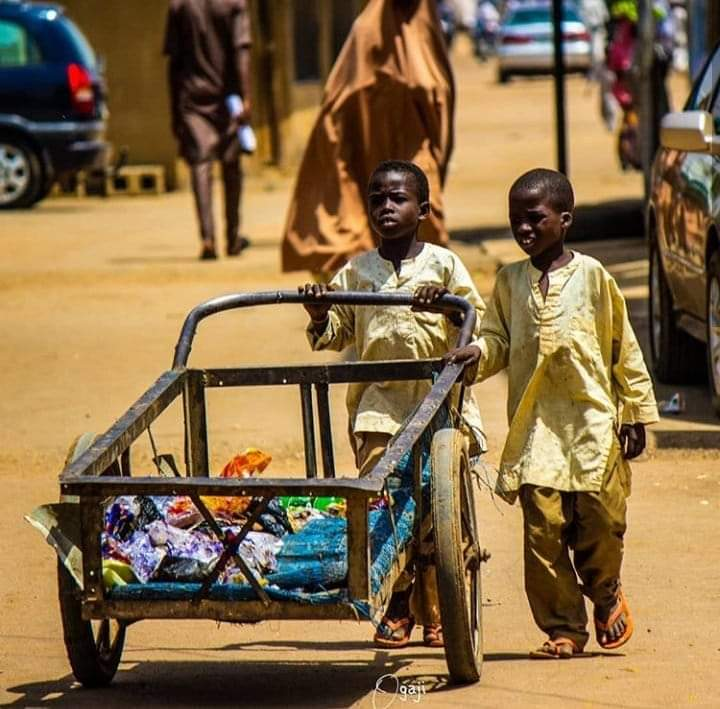
Almajirai on a labour work

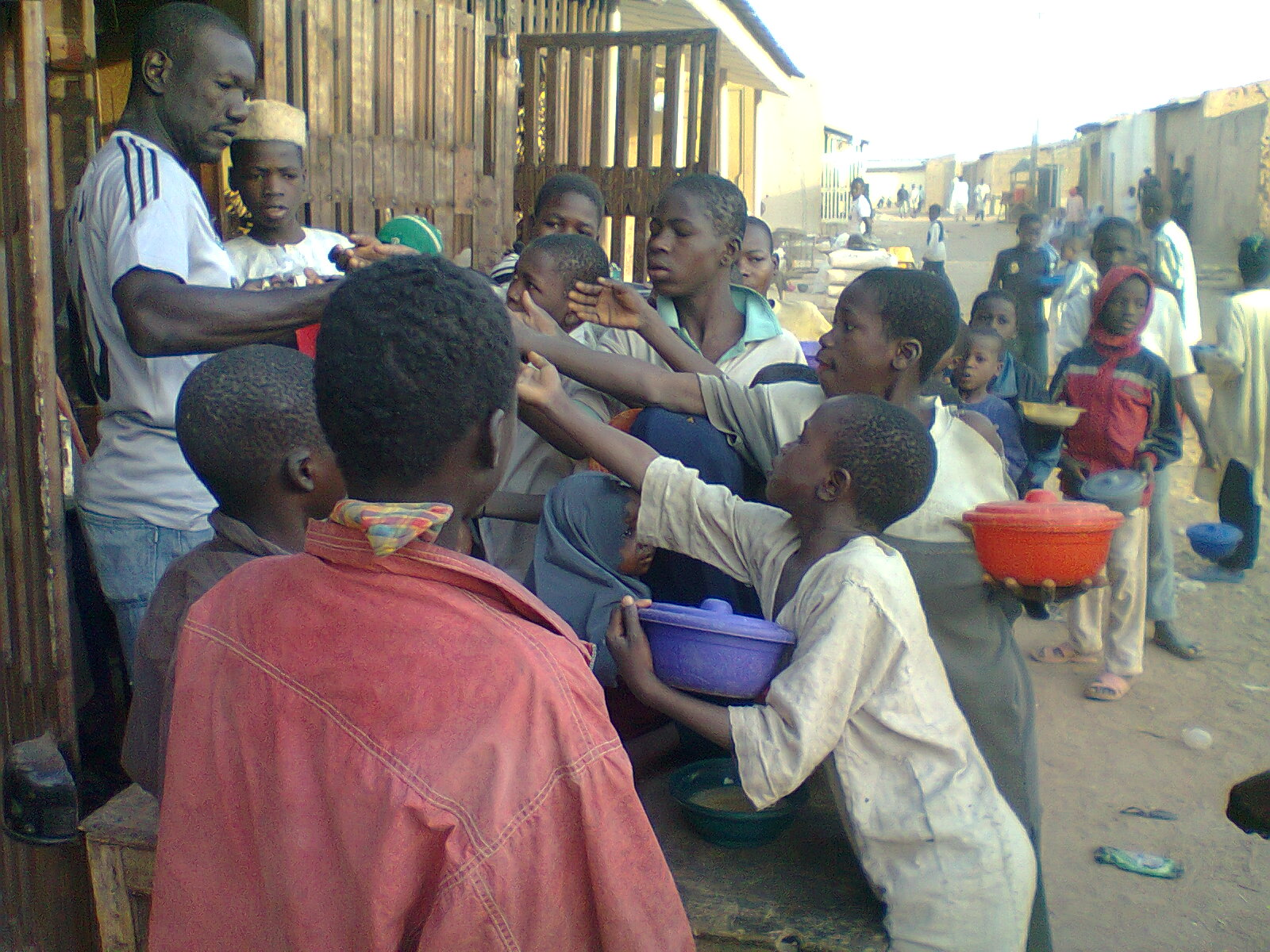
Almajirai collecting food in a street in Katsina, Katsina State, Nigeria

The almajiri system has been highly controversial in Nigeria. Some believe that the almajiri system was originally good, but has since deteriorated. Critics say that the almajiri system promotes poverty and neglects, abuses, and exploits young boys, who wear tattered clothing, beg for food on the streets, and work for free. In one study of almajirai in the Kaduna state, 38% of boys surveyed said they were tired all the time, and 62% reported feeling hungry. In the same study, 88% of almajirai said they spend most of their time begging. Some Muslims criticize this practice, as begging is generally discouraged in Islam. Moreover, the conditions that almajirai live in are often unhygienic and not conducive to their health.

The almajiri system is often attacked for promoting youth delinquency and violence and for providing street gangs and Boko Haram with an ample supply of vulnerable young recruits. People believe that the almajiri system fuels Boko Haram because 1) the children are radically indoctrinated and manipulated by their Quranic teachers and 2) the children are economically disadvantaged and live without their parents, which makes them easy targets for recruitment. Some say that Boko Haram would not exist with almajirai, while others say there's no evidence that Boko Haram recruits from almajirai systematically more than they recruit from any other vulnerable youth demographic in Nigeria. A recent study involving interviews with scholars whose works have associated the Almajirai with terrorism found no evidence supporting the extremism discourse other than hypothetical worst-case scenarios based on an economic deprivation thesis, which contributes to securitisation of the Almajirai.

Additionally, since the almajirai do not receive a secular education (math, science, English, etc.), they are often unequipped for professional jobs.

Because almajirai beg on the streets and are seen by some as unproductive to society, the children face widespread stigmatization: some consider them to be "the butchers of Nigeria,” "urchins" and "nuisances."

== Support ==
Some still consider the almajirai system to be a legitimate, time-honored way to teach children the Quran and Muslim values. Many almajirai consider themselves to be humble and devoted scholars searching for the most holy knowledge. Several Sunnah encourage the seeking of Islamic knowledge, such as "Seeking knowledge is a duty upon every Muslim" (Vol. 1, Book 1, Hadith 224) and "Whoever goes out seeking knowledge, then he is in Allah's cause until he returns" (Vol. 5, Book 39, Hadith 2647). Supporters of the almajiri education system believe that it teaches children to be pious, moral, and beneficial to society.

Some argue that the negative stereotypes of almajirai make them easy scapegoats. They argue that the almajirai system itself may not be the causal factor in the poverty the boys face. As part of efforts to vaccinate every child in Nigeria, the World Health Organization has supported the Nigerian Government to vaccinate as many alamajiri children in the northern part of Nigeria as possible. The vaccination was targeted at schools and houses where the children are found.

Additionally, some say that there is no evidence that Boko Haram or other violent groups recruit from almajirai more than any other cohort of disadvantaged youth.

In an effort to control how almajiri schools operate in the state, the Kaduna State government plans to register them.

== See also ==
- JIBWIS
- Khalwa, the Sudanese name for these schools
