= Ad Damer District =

Coordinates: 17.5785°N 33.96994°E

Ad Damer
- District
- Country: Sudan
- State: River Nile

Ad Damer is a district of River Nile state, Sudan.
