= Al-Tijani Yusuf Bashir =

Sudanese poet (1912–1937)

- Born: 1912; Omdurman, Anglo-Egyptian Sudan
- Died: 1937 (aged 24–25)
- Occupation: Poet
- Notable work: Ishrāqa ("Illumination")

Al-Tijani Yusuf Bashir (1912–1937) was a Sudanese poet who wrote in Arabic. He died from tuberculosis at the age of 25, and his work only became widely known after his death. Al-Tijani's poetry is generally classified as belonging to the Romantic tradition, although he had strong Neoclassical influences.

== Biography ==
Al-Tijani was born in Omdurman into a prominent Sufi family. His father named him after Ahmad al-Tijani, the founder of the Tijaniyyah order. Al-Tijani was initially schooled at a local khalwa (religious school) that was run by his uncle, Shaykh Muhammad al-Kitayyabi, and then completed his education at Omdurman's al-Mahad al-Ilmi, a college of literature and forerunner of Omdurman Islamic University. He had a wide knowledge of both Classical and Modern Arabic literature, and also read some Arabic translations of Western literature. As a student, al-Tijani declared that Ahmed Shawqi's poetry was comparable to that in the Quran. This was considered tantamount to blasphemy, and led to his expulsion from al-Mahad. He later worked for a time for the Shell Petroleum Company as a petrol pump attendant and for a newspaper. During the early 1930s, he sought to continue his studies in Cairo but was prevented from leaving the country by British colonial authorities. Al-Tijani died at the age of 25, having suffered from tuberculosis for several years. He died in poverty, with a contemporary noting that he wore only cloth shoes, his clothing was generally torn and of poor quality, and that he could only afford a turban, not a skullcap.

== Poetry ==
Al-Tijani's only published work is Ishrāqa ("Illumination"), a collection of his poetry. It was first printed in 1946, after his death, and as of 2008 ten editions had been issued. Al-Tijani's poetry has been described as having a "decidedly Romantic colour", but not to the point of sentimentality. One critic, ʻAbd Allah ʻAli Ibrahim, describes him as "exhibit[ing] prodigious loyalties to creativity, youth, and poverty". His work includes persistent references to the natural world, especially water and light, which he frequently employs as metaphors or symbols. Salma Khadra Jayyusi has suggested that his admiration of nature approaches pantheism, and attributes this and his frequent use of mystical language to his Sufi background.

Al-Tijani's classical education meant he retained many of the Neoclassical features used by earlier writers, including archaic mannerisms and obsolete vocabulary. Khadra Jayyusi has suggested that this represents a "major defect" in his work, and "partly explains his relative obscurity in the Arab world". Al-Tijani is frequently compared with Aboul-Qacem Echebbi, a Tunisian writer, due to their shared religious backgrounds and periods of ill health. Additionally, Khadra Jayyusi likens his work to that of the Syrian writer Badawi al-Jabal, due to their shared embrace of mystical language and use of Sufi literary forms.

== See also ==
- Arabic poetry
- List of Sudanese writers
- Sudanese literature
