= Atbara District =

Atbara
- District
- Coordinates: 17°41′17″N 34°00′06″E
- Country: Sudan
- State: River Nile

Atbara is a district of River Nile state, Sudan.
