= Abdullah El Tayib =

Sudanese academic and nonfiction writer (1921–2003)

Abdullah El Tayib, also referred to as 'Abd Allāh al-Tayyib al-Majdhūb (2 June 1921 – 19 June 2003), was a prominent Sudanese writer and scholar of Sudanese literature and the Arabic language. He was born in Tamirab, a village near Ad-Dāmar in Sudan, during the Anglo-Egyptian condominium and received his primary education in Kassala, Ad-Damar and Berber. After graduating from Gordon Memorial College (now University of Khartoum), he continued his studies until his PhD from the School of Oriental and African Studies, University of London, in 1950.

El Tayib occupied leading academic and administrative positions at universities in Khartoum, Juba and Kano, Nigeria. He was also president of the Arab Language League of Sudan and a member of the Arabic Language Academy in Cairo, Egypt. His scholarly work was dedicated to the history and development of Arabic poetry from pre-Islamic to modern times, as well as to editions of folk tales of Sudan.

== Life and career ==
El Tayib was elected first as Dean of the Faculty of Arts (1961–1974) and then as President (1974–1975) of the University of Khartoum. Following this, he was the first director of the University of Juba (1975–1976) and the founder and provost of Abdullahi Bayero College (1964-1966) which later became Bayero University Kano in Nigeria.

El Tayib's primary field of research was the Arabic language, and he has been considered among the most important scholars of Arabic literature and language in the 20th century. One of his most notable works is A Guide to Understanding Arabic Poetry, a massive opus written over thirty five years, for which he was awarded the King Faisal Prize for Arabic Language and Literature in 2000. In their tribute to his work, the judges of this prize wrote: "The first three volumes are regarded as the most thorough analysis known of the composition, rhythm, unity and other features of Arabic poetry since pre-Islamic eras. The fourth volume – a landmark text of over 1,500 pages – includes exhaustive details of the role of both ancient and modern Arab literary critics, the development of the Arabic poem through the centuries and its impact on European poets from Dante to Andrew Marvel, Blake and the Romantic poets."

Apart from scholarly work, El Tayib was also known as poet, playwright and author of essays on African culture. His collections of Sudanese folk tales Heroes of Arabia, Folk Tales from the Northern Sudan and his Stories from the Sands of Africa were translated into English and illustrated by his wife, Griselda El Tayib, a British-Sudanese art historian and artist. He is also remembered for his numerous radio broadcasts, interpreting the language and messages of the Qur’an over a span of 35 years.

In recognition of his achievements, the University of Khartoum established the 'Professor Abdallah El Tayeb Institute for the Arabic Language' in 1992.

== See also ==
- Sudanese literature
- Arabic literature
- List of Sudanese writers
- Muhammad al-Mahdi al-Majdhub
