= Ad-Damir =

Ad-Damir الدامر Ad-Dāmar
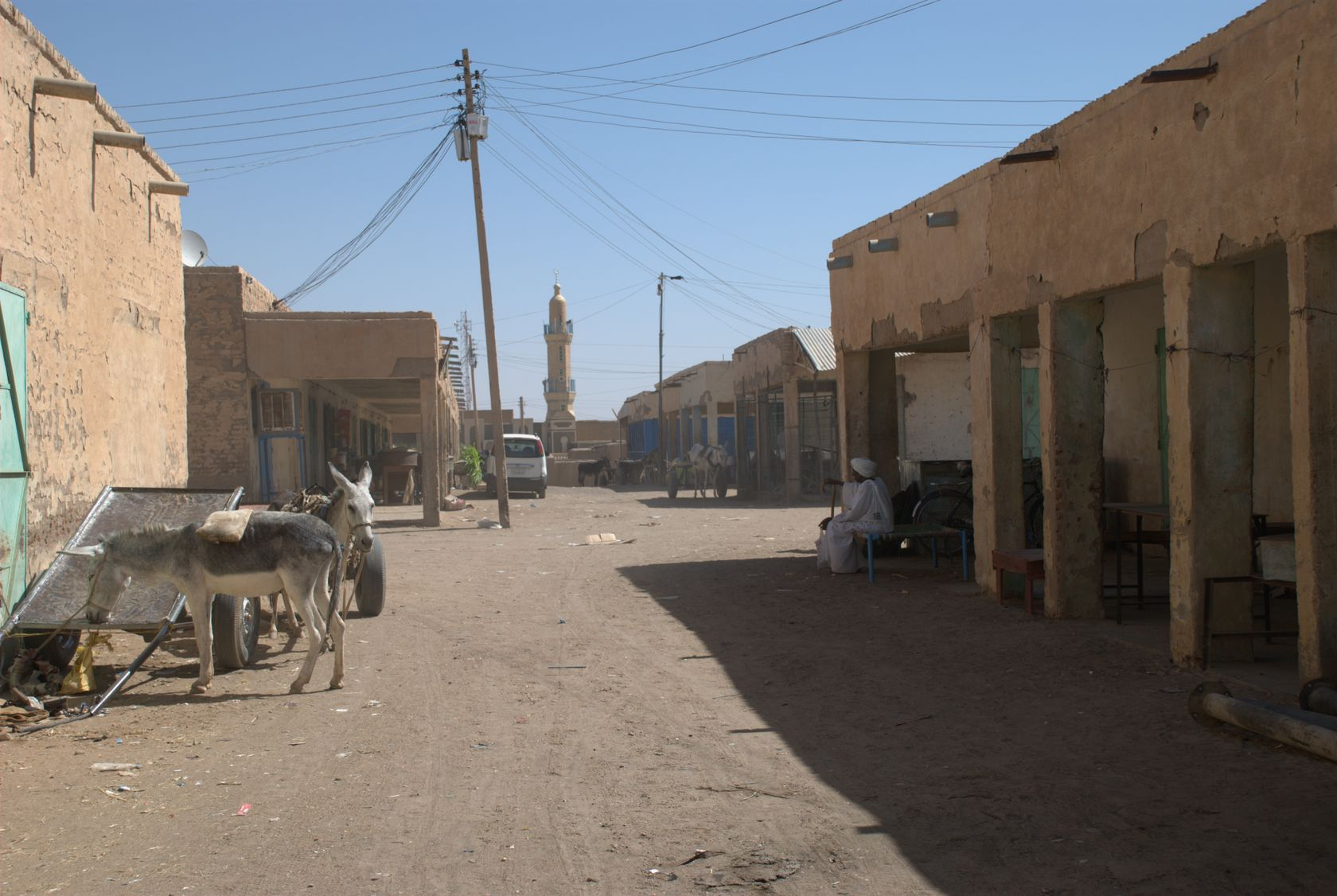

- Location in Sudan
- Coordinates: 17°35′24″N 33°57′36″E
- Country: Sudan
- State: River Nile State
- District: Ad Damer District

Government

Population
  - Total: 122,944
- Time zone: UTC+3 (UTC)
- postal_code: 46612
- Rank: 19th, Sudan

Ad-Damir or ad-Damar (Arabic: الدامر, romanized: ad-Dāmar) is the capital of the River Nile state in Sudan. It lies on the right (east) bank of the Nile River, at an elevation of 1,158 feet (353 metres), about 155 miles (249 km) northeast of Khartoum, with a population of about 122,944 (estimated 2012). Its famous market, Soug as-Sabit, is the most important in the area. Ad-Dāmar is an example of a Sudanese African-Islamic city founded toward the end of the fifteenth century. Since ad-Damar was located on the bank of the river, it could be expected to exhibit a linear morphology.

By 1814, it was a large town, containing about 500 houses. The city was clean and had many new buildings. Houses were uniform in construction and with regular streets with shady trees (Burckhardt, 1980; Crawford, 1951). Ad-Dāmar is linked by road and railway and both transport routes are almost parallel to the Nile River, with nearby ʿAṭbarah and Barbar and with Khartoum. An oil pipeline, about 530 miles (850 km) in length, between Port Sudan and Khartoum passes by the outskirts of the town. Pop. (2008 prelim.) 73,654. It is mentioned in some books that Ad-Dāmar is one of the oldest cities in the country and the whole region.

== History ==
=== Turkish Egyptian rule ===
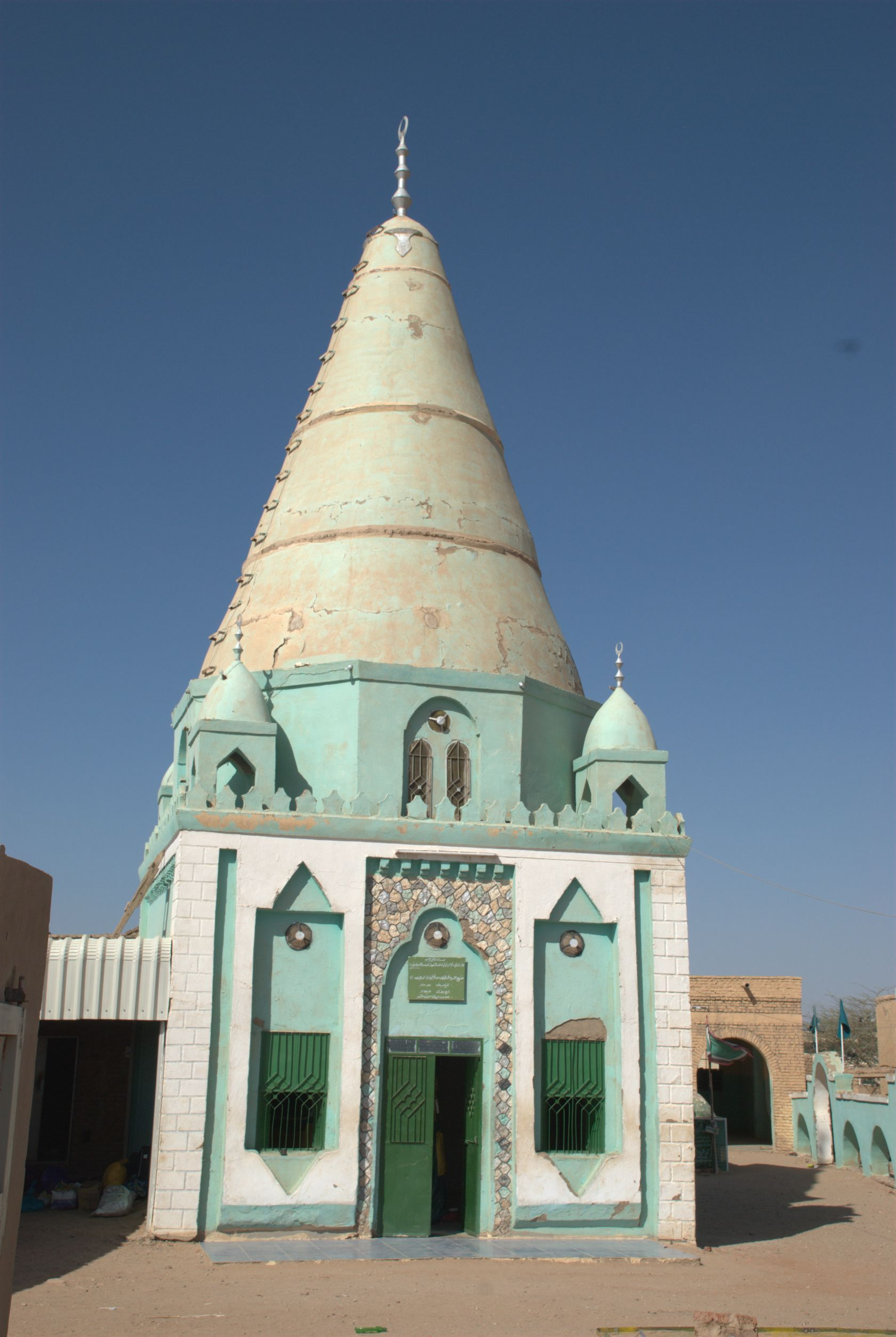
Tomb of Muhammad al-Majdhub

In 1821, Ismail Kamel Pasha, the son of Muhammad Ali Pasha, during his invasion to Sudan, sent his ally the leader of the Mirbab tribe, Nasr al-Din al-Sadig, from the city of Berber to Ad-Damar, to urge the elders (Almajazeeb) of the city to offer loyalty to the new ruler of the country.

The elders of the city refused to do so and threatened to confront the Basha if their city was entered by his people. Ismael Kamel Pasha continued to move inwards and moved with his army from Barber to the Horn, where Atbara River meets with the Nile. Ismael Kamel Pasha met Almajazeeb with their neighbors and allies at the Quib area (where there is Atbara bridge currently) and was followed by the Faqih Muhammad bin Faqih Ahmad Ab Jadari.

The invasion army used reinforcements from soldiers to defeat the fighters of the Majazeeb. The Majazeeb were defeated, killed and their families, houses and mosques destroyed. Almjazeeb distributed among the areas of Atbara river, Botana, Kassala, and Gedaref. In the end, the Majazeeb left Ad-Dāmar. Ad-Dāmar returned to its former prosperity when the Turks issued a general amnesty for the people of Ad-Dāmar, leaders and Sheikhs. The students started to come back seeking education again.

The relationship between the elders of the Damer (Almajazeeb) and the Turkish-Egyptian government improved, even more, when General Gordon Pasha arrived in Sudan, where he was welcomed by them. He ordered the exemption of their leader, the jurist Ahmed bin Jalaluddin, from taxes. He was rewarded with an annual grant of ten pounds.

=== The Mahdia Revolution ===
Sheikhs in Ad-Dāmar supported the Mahdia revolution and they did albaia (the promise) to Khalifa Abdullah Altaeshi and chose to stand by their side in the war against the Turkish rule and engaged in various sites of jihad. A number of people from Ad-Dāmar became leaders in the army of the Mahdia.

== Climate ==
Ad-Damir has a hot desert climate (Köppen: BWh) characterized by consistently high temperatures, minimal precipitation, and low humidity. April through October are extremely hot, with high temperatures often exceeding 40 °C (104 °F), while the rest of the year experiences somewhat cooler temperatures.

Climate data for Ad-Damir (1991–2020)
Month	Jan	Feb	Mar	Apr	May	Jun	Jul	Aug	Sep	Oct	Nov	Dec	Year
Record high °C (°F)	39.6 (103.3)	41.5 (106.7)	45.6 (114.1)	46.0 (114.8)	48.6 (119.5)	47.2 (117.0)	46.6 (115.9)	46.3 (115.3)	45.2 (113.4)	44.3 (111.7)	40.6 (105.1)	39.8 (103.6)	48.6 (119.5)
Mean daily maximum °C (°F)	29.6 (85.3)	32.2 (90.0)	35.7 (96.3)	39.5 (103.1)	42.4 (108.3)	43.1 (109.6)	40.7 (105.3)	40.1 (104.2)	41.4 (106.5)	39.7 (103.5)	34.9 (94.8)	31.4 (88.5)	37.6 (99.7)
Daily mean °C (°F)	21.7 (71.1)	23.7 (74.7)	27.0 (80.6)	30.8 (87.4)	34.2 (93.6)	35.5 (95.9)	34.2 (93.6)	33.7 (92.7)	34.3 (93.7)	32.4 (90.3)	27.6 (81.7)	23.7 (74.7)	29.9 (85.8)
Mean daily minimum °C (°F)	13.8 (56.8)	15.3 (59.5)	18.2 (64.8)	22.2 (72.0)	26.1 (79.0)	27.9 (82.2)	27.6 (81.7)	27.4 (81.3)	27.2 (81.0)	25.1 (77.2)	20.3 (68.5)	16.0 (60.8)	22.3 (72.1)
Record low °C (°F)	6.0 (42.8)	5.8 (42.4)	10.2 (50.4)	12.5 (54.5)	14.9 (58.8)	21.5 (70.7)	21.6 (70.9)	20.0 (68.0)	20.4 (68.7)	16.7 (62.1)	11.8 (53.2)	8.2 (46.8)	5.8 (42.4)
Average precipitation mm (inches)	0.0 (0.0)	0.0 (0.0)	0.0 (0.0)	0.0 (0.0)	3.2 (0.13)	1.6 (0.06)	7.6 (0.30)	24.7 (0.97)	6.2 (0.24)	3.5 (0.14)	0.0 (0.0)	0.0 (0.0)	47.0 (1.85)
Average precipitation days (≥ 1.0 mm)	0.0	0.0	0.0	0.0	0.4	0.2	1.3	1.8	1.1	0.5	0.0	0.0	5.4
Average relative humidity (%)	34	27	20	17	18	19	29	35	27	28	31	36	27
Mean monthly sunshine hours	306.9	274.4	306.9	306.0	291.4	267.0	248.0	229.4	252.0	291.4	303.0	306.9	3,383.3
Source: NOAA

== Administration ==
Ad-Damer is the capital of the River Nile state. It consists of seven administrative units:

1. Ad-Dāmar City Unit.
2. Unit Sidon.
3. Al-Atabrawi unit.
4. Unit of the Nile.
5. Zaidab unit.
6. Rescue Unit.
7. New Manaseer Unit.

== Notable residents ==
- Hanan al-Neel
