= Korti =

Korti كورتي Kurti
- Town
- Location in Sudan
- Coordinates: 18°6′17″N 31°34′3″E
- Country: Sudan
- State: Northern

Korti or Kurti (Arabic: كورتي) is a town in northern-central Sudan. In the Meroitic period, the city appeared as Cadetum, Cadata or Coetum in Roman sources. The town lies about 250 kilometres (160 mi) from Khartoum, on the south side of the Nile, at the terminus of the Wadi Muqaddam. It is also known for being the centre location for the Shaigiya tribe.

== History ==
In 1820, the town was the site of a battle between the Shaiqiya and an invading force of Muhammad Ali Pasha. In 1881, the Mahdist uprising led to Britain sending in an army in August 1884 under Garnet Wolseley in the so-called Nile Expedition to relieve General Gordon. Korti became a rallying point for British troops. In January 1885, a fort was built by British troops on the north side of the Nile, right in front of Korti. From here, the advance on the Nile and through the desert could take place simultaneously. In the fighting in the Bayuda Desert between Kurti and Metemmeh (on the Nile opposite Shendi), the Mahdist Sudanese suffered a defeat in the Battle of Abu Klea soon after the base at Korti was built.

== See also ==
- List of cities in Sudan
- Subdivisions of Sudan
- Umbukole
