= Atbara =

Atbara عطبرة
- City
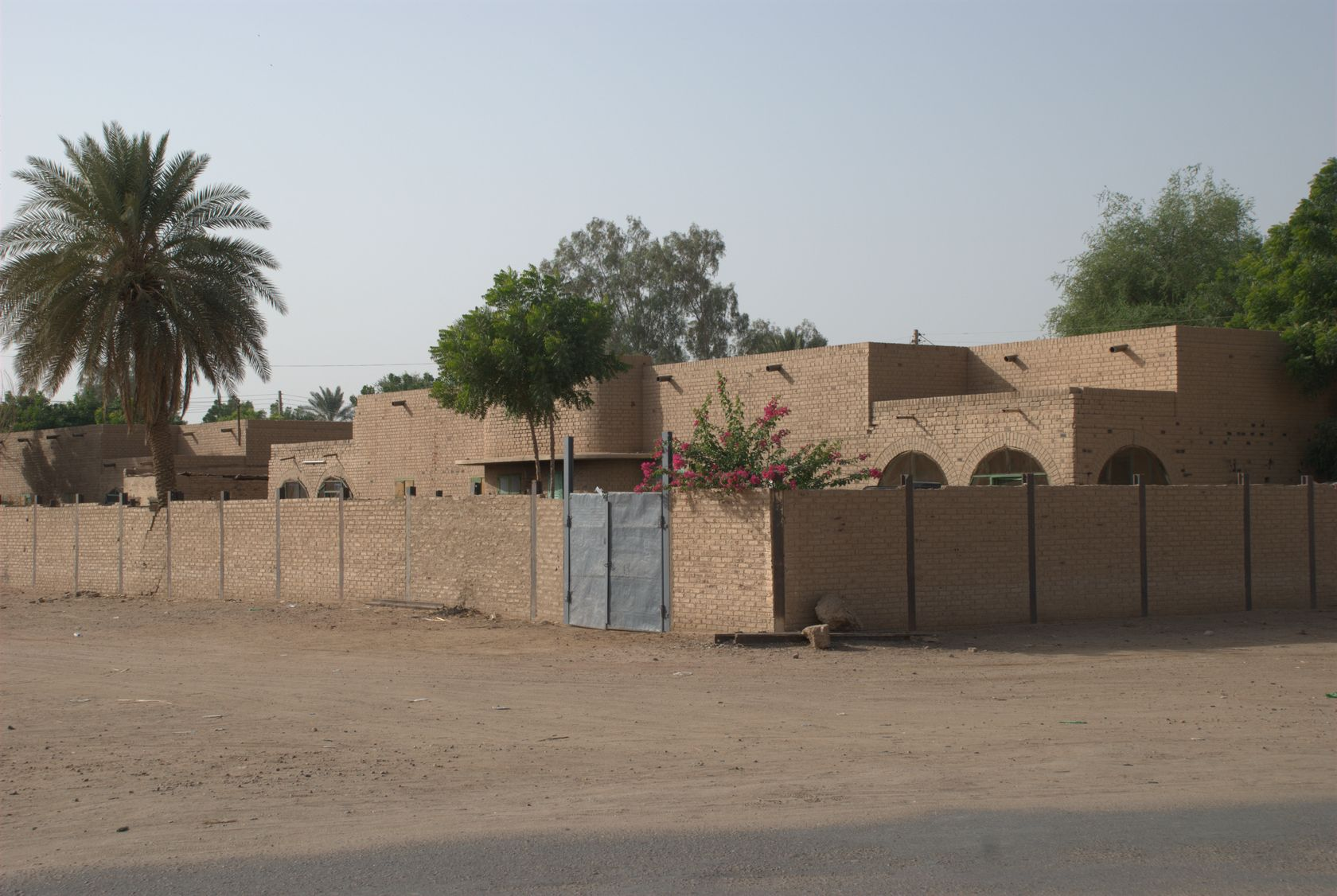

- Location in Sudan
- Coordinates: 17°42′43″N 34°00′02″E
- Country: Sudan
- State: River Nile
- Elevation: 1,175 ft (358 m)

Population (2008)
  - Total: 134,586
- Time zone: UTC+02:00 (CAT)

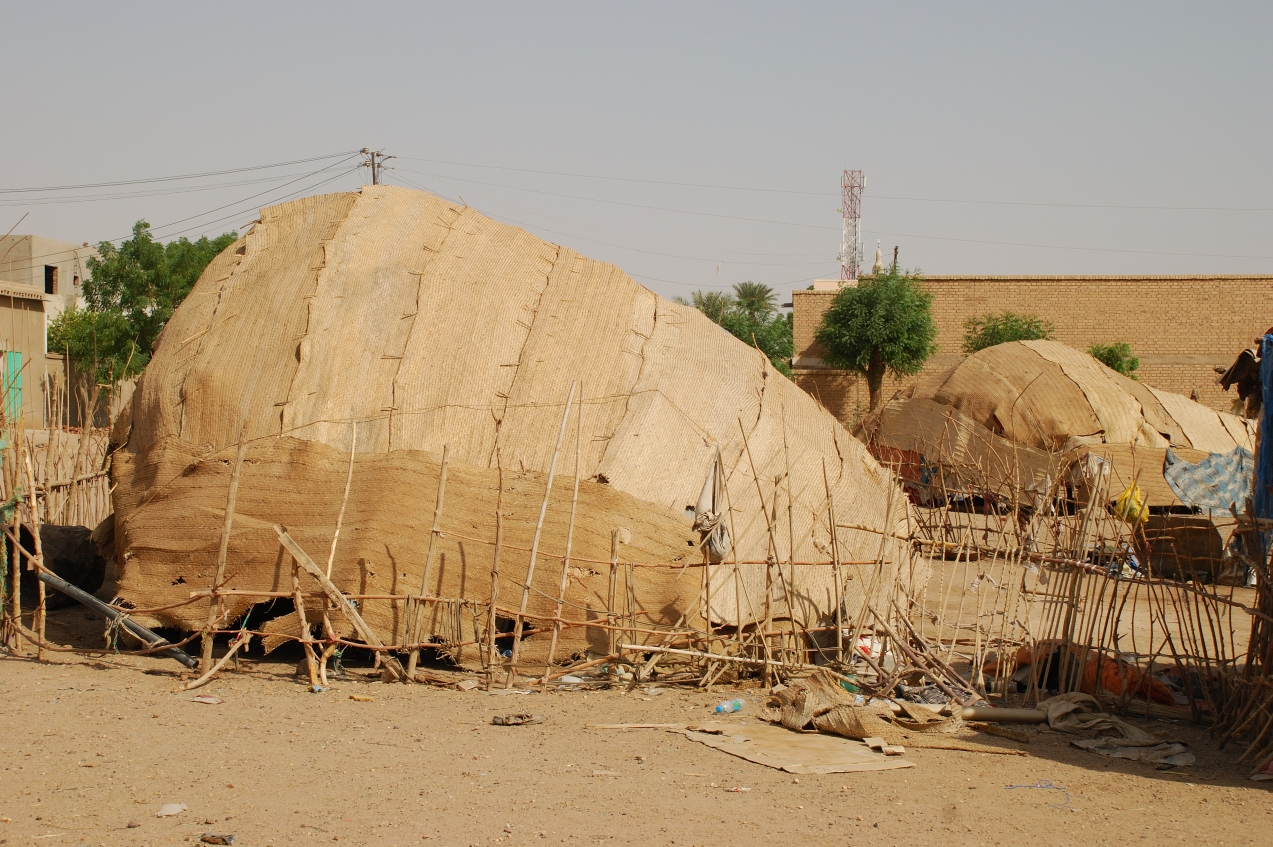
Traditional Beja tents alongside modern buildings

Map of railway lines in Sudan, showing location of Atbara

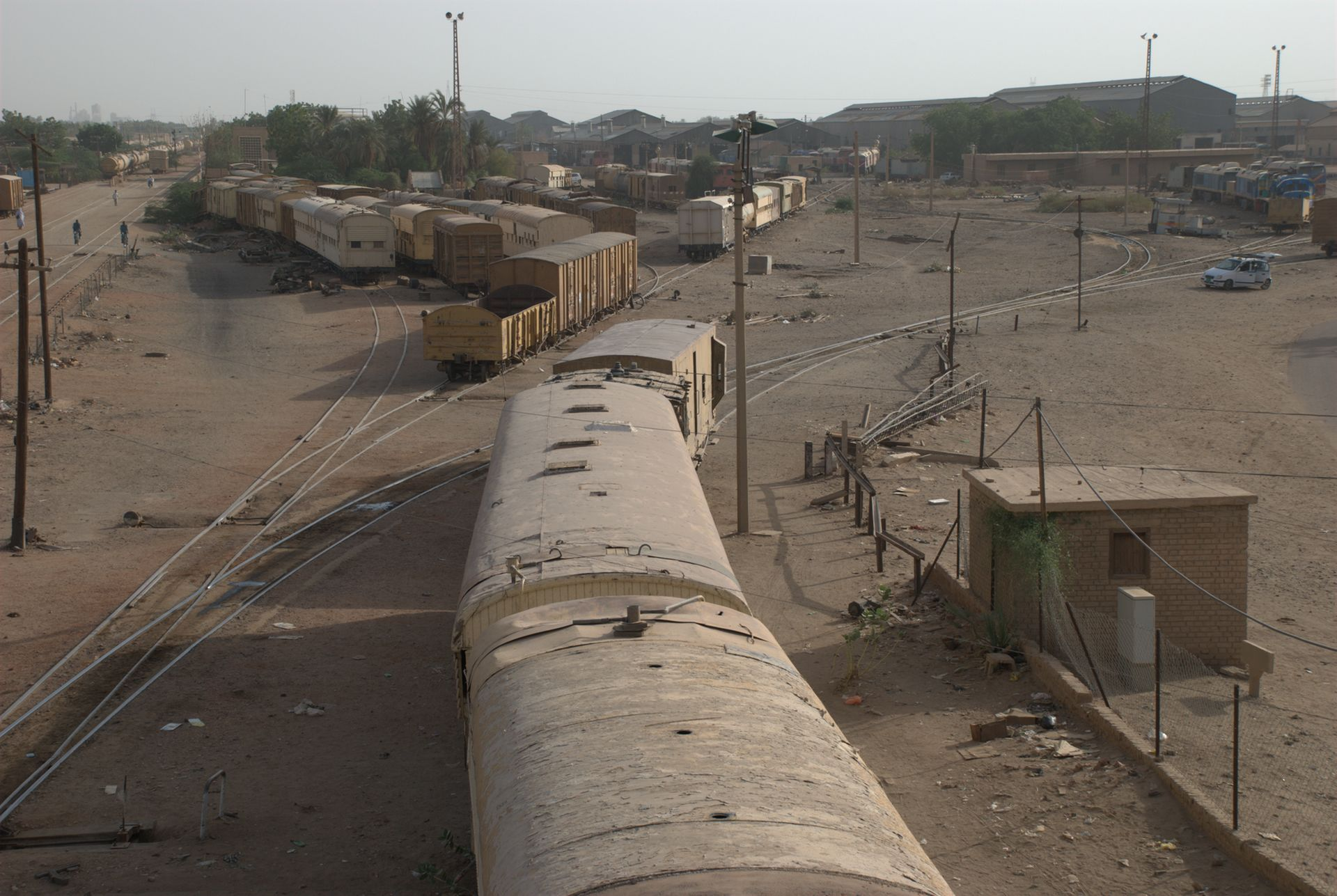
Atbara Railway Station

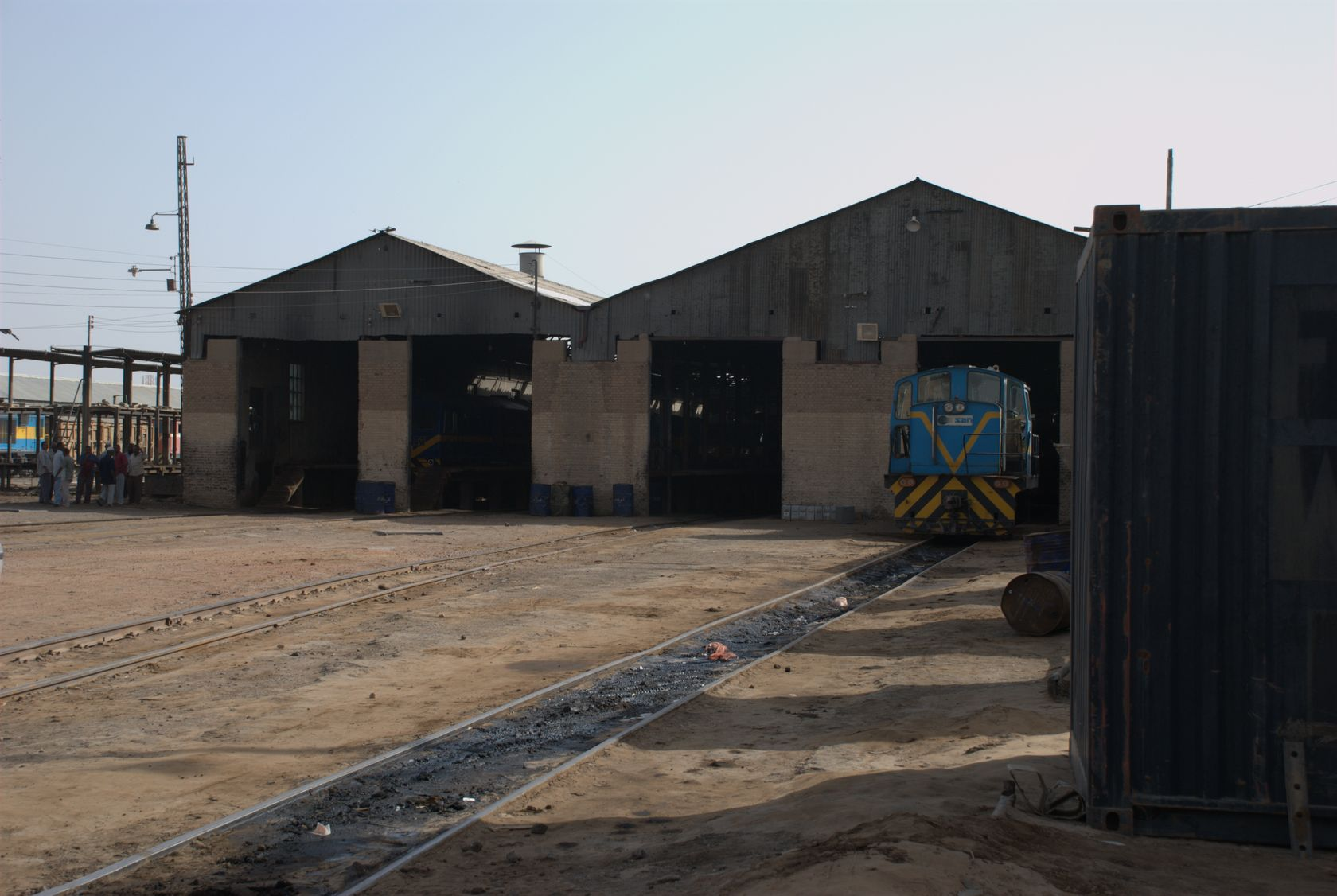
Atbara railway factory workshop

Atbara (sometimes Atbarah) (Arabic: عطبرة ʿAṭbarah) is a city located in River Nile State in northeastern Sudan.

Because of its links to the railway industry, Atbara is also known as the 'Railway City'.

Atbara's population was recorded as 134,586 during the 2008 census.

== History ==
The confluence of the Nile and its most northern tributary, the Atbarah River (Bahr-el-Aswad, or Black River) was a strategic location for military operations. in the year 1619 Atbara was conquered and sacked by forces of the Ethiopian Empire. In the Battle of Atbara, fought on 8 April 1898 near Nakheila, on the north bank of the river, Lord Kitchener's Anglo-Egyptian army defeated the Mahdist forces, commanded by Amir Mahmud Ahmad. Kitchener's strengthened position led to a decisive victory at the Battle of Omdurman on 2 September 1898, giving the British control over the Sudan.

The town was the centre of the Sudanese railway industry. Few trains are made here now and rail traffic is much reduced. The original station and unusual dome-shaped houses of railway workers remain. The first trade union in Sudan formed in 1946 among railroad workers in Atbara.

Perhaps because of the influence of the railway unions, Atbara is also considered by many to be the home of Sudanese communism. Jaafar Nimeiri, Sudan's president from 1969 to 1985, alternated between communism, capitalism, and Islamic fundamentalism – depending on who he was trying to get on his side and extract money from – and the communist phase had its stronghold around Atbara.

Atbara was also the starting point for mobilizations against the regime in December 2018.

== Geography ==
Atbara is located at the junction of the Nile and Atbarah rivers.

Atbara is made up of several districts including Umbukole district which was home to the First Higher School in Atbara. Other districts include the railway district, Almurabaat, Alsawdana and Almatar.

Umbukole was originally the name given to a capital city in a northern state in Kurti county. It is now mostly remembered as the name of a small district in Atbara.

One of the major districts of Atbara is Al-Dakhla (الداخلة) in Arabic. Some still use the name Al-Dakhla referring to Atbara.

=== Climate ===
Atbara has a hot desert climate (Köppen climate classification BWh). The annual mean temperature reaches over 30 °C (86 °F) and the average highs exceed 40 °C (104 °F) during 7 months of the year. The annual average rainfall is 60 mm, mostly from July and August. Atbara is sunny, averaging 3,545 hours of bright sunshine per year or 81% of possible sunshine.

Climate data for Atbara (1991–2020 normals, extremes 1943–present)
Month	Jan	Feb	Mar	Apr	May	Jun	Jul	Aug	Sep	Oct	Nov	Dec	Year
Record high °C (°F)	41 (106)	42 (108)	46.1 (115.0)	47.1 (116.8)	48 (118)	48 (118)	47.7 (117.9)	47 (117)	47.6 (117.7)	44.6 (112.3)	43 (109)	39.4 (102.9)	48 (118)
Mean daily maximum °C (°F)	30.6 (87.1)	33.1 (91.6)	36.7 (98.1)	40.7 (105.3)	43.2 (109.8)	44.0 (111.2)	41.9 (107.4)	40.8 (105.4)	42.1 (107.8)	40.3 (104.5)	35.8 (96.4)	31.9 (89.4)	38.4 (101.1)
Daily mean °C (°F)	22.5 (72.5)	24.5 (76.1)	27.8 (82.0)	31.9 (89.4)	35.9 (96.6)	36.0 (96.8)	35.0 (95.0)	34.2 (93.6)	35.1 (95.2)	33.1 (91.6)	28.2 (82.8)	24.1 (75.4)	30.7 (87.3)
Mean daily minimum °C (°F)	14.5 (58.1)	15.9 (60.6)	18.8 (65.8)	23.0 (73.4)	28.6 (83.5)	28.0 (82.4)	28.0 (82.4)	27.6 (81.7)	28.0 (82.4)	25.8 (78.4)	20.6 (69.1)	16.2 (61.2)	22.9 (73.2)
Record low °C (°F)	6 (43)	5.5 (41.9)	10 (50)	13 (55)	18.8 (65.8)	21 (70)	19 (66)	18.6 (65.5)	20 (68)	16.4 (61.5)	11.7 (53.1)	6.5 (43.7)	5.5 (41.9)
Average precipitation mm (inches)	0.0 (0.0)	0.0 (0.0)	0.0 (0.0)	0.2 (0.01)	3.4 (0.13)	0.8 (0.03)	10.8 (0.43)	24.2 (0.95)	5.3 (0.21)	5.1 (0.20)	0.0 (0.0)	0.0 (0.0)	49.7 (1.96)
Average precipitation days (≥ 1.0 mm)	0.0	0.0	0.0	0.1	0.5	0.2	1.2	2.0	0.9	0.5	0.0	0.0	5.5
Average relative humidity (%)	38	32	25	23	24	23	36	41	34	32	37	40	32
Average dew point °C (°F)	7.5 (45.5)	6.7 (44.1)	6.0 (42.8)	8.2 (46.8)	10.1 (50.2)	11.6 (52.9)	17.7 (63.9)	19.0 (66.2)	16.9 (62.4)	14.2 (57.6)	12.1 (53.8)	9.6 (49.3)	11.6 (53.0)
Mean monthly sunshine hours	275.9	257.6	282.1	282.0	266.6	243.0	226.3	207.7	225.0	282.1	288.0	288.3	3,124.6
Source 1: NOAA
Source 2: Meteo Climat (record temperatures)

== Economy ==
The trans-African automobile route — the Cairo-Cape Town Highway passes through Atbara. Atbara Airport is located east of the city.

Atbara is an important railway junction and railroad manufacturing centre, and most employment in Atbara is related to the rail lines. The Sudanese National Railway Company's headquarters are located in Atbara.

The city also is home to one of Sudan's largest cement factories, the Atbara Cement Corporation.

== Demographics ==
Year	Population
1956	36,300
1973	66,116
1983	73,009
1993	87,878
2007 (Estimate)	111,399
2008	134,586

== Notable residents ==
- Mandour Elmahdi, author of A Short History of the Sudan.
- Rashid Mahdi, photographer

== See also ==
- Ethiopia - border country for the Blue Nile.
