= River Nile State =

State of Sudan

River Nile State ولاية نهر النيل
- State
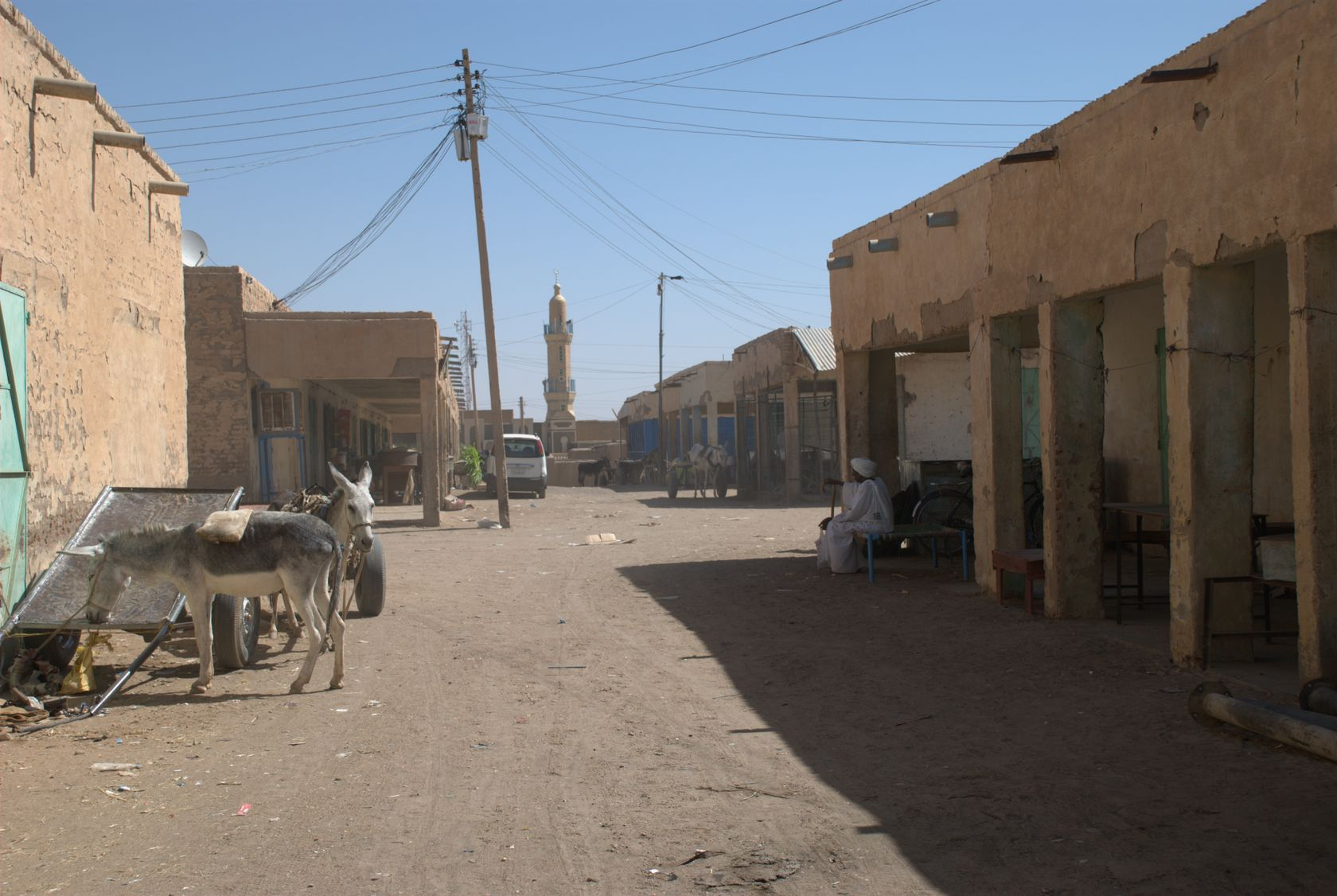
- Market street in Ad-Damir

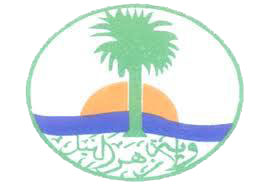
- Seal

- Location in Sudan.
- Coordinates: 18°27′N 33°23′E
- Country: Sudan
- Capital: Ad-Damir

Government
  - Governor: Mohamed Al-Badawi Abu Qroun

Area
  - Total: 122,123 km^{2} (47,152 sq mi)

Population (2018)
  - Total: 1,511,442
- Time zone: UTC+2 (CAT)
- HDI (2017): 0.602 medium · 3rd

River Nile State (Arabic: ولاية نهر النيل, romanized: Nahr an Nīl) is one of the 18 states (wilayat) of Sudan. It has an area of 122,123 km² (47,152 mi²) and an estimated population of 1,511,442 (2018 est).. The state borders Northern to the west, Khartoum to the south, Kassala to the southeast, Red Sea State to the east, and Egypt to the north. It is made up of seven localities.

== Localities ==
- Ad-Damir (Capital)
- Atbara
- Shendi
- Berber
- Abu Hamed
- El Matamah
- El Buhaira

== Districts ==
Districts of River Nile

1. Abu Hamad District
2. Berber District
3. Ad Damer District
4. Atbara District
5. Shendi District
6. Al Matammah District
