= Postage stamps and postal history of Sudan =

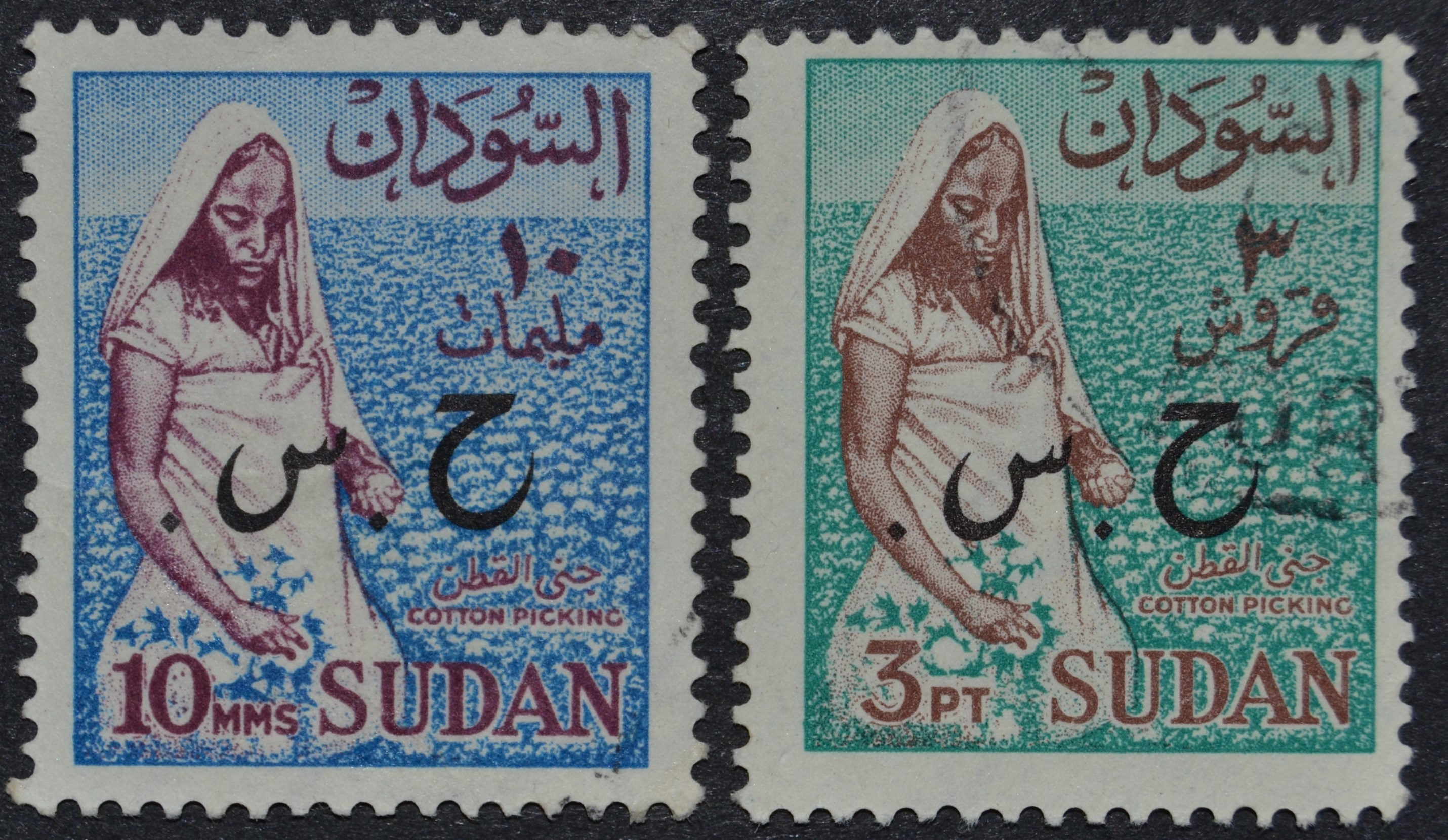
1962 stamps of Sudan

Sudan was governed by the United Kingdom and Egypt from 1898. Independence was proclaimed on 1 January, 1956, and independent Sudan became a member of the Universal Postal Union (UPU) on 27 July 1956.

== Early postal services ==
The first post offices to be opened in Turkish-Egyptian Sudan were in 1867 at Suakin and Wadi Halfa; in 1873 at Dongola, Berber and Khartoum; and in 1877 at Sennar, Karkouk, Fazoglu, El-Gadarif, El Obeid, Al-Fasher and Fashoda (now Kodok).

The Mahdist revolt, which began in 1881, resulted in all Egyptian post offices being closed by 1884. It culminated in the fall of Khartoum and the death of the British governor Charles George Gordon (Gordon of Khartoum) in 1885. The Egyptians and British withdrew their forces from Sudan and the country was left with no postal service until the reconquest of Sudan began in 1896. When the campaign started in March 1896, postal service was made available to the troops, but no stamps were used.

Until the issue of Sudan stamps in 1897, the available stamps were Egyptian stamps. The amount of mail was small and only a few stamps were used. Between March and July 1885 2½d and 5d British postage stamps were used in Suakin. Indian stamps are also known to have been used in the same area, postmarked Sawakin or Souakin, between 1884 and 1899.

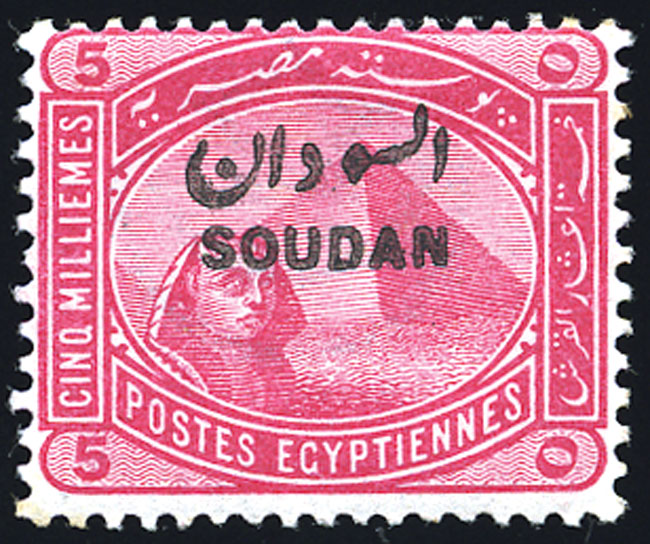
The 1897 series

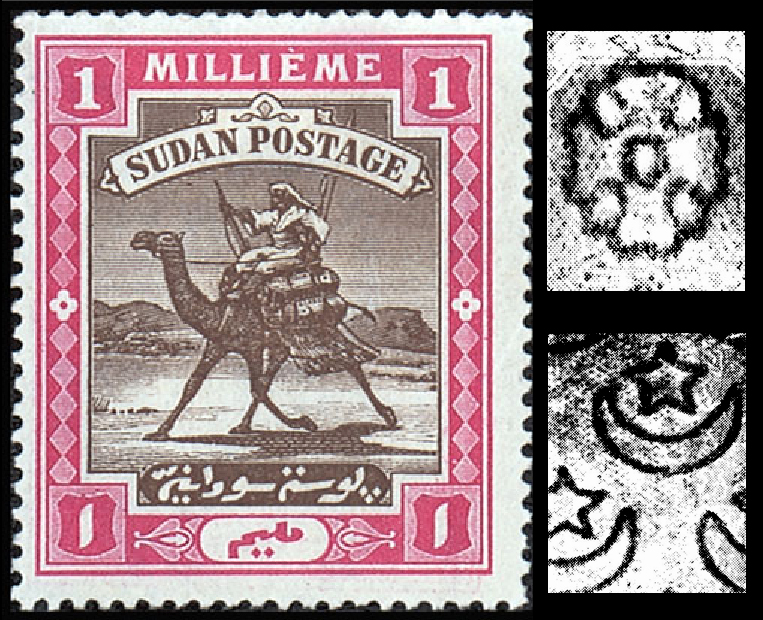
The 1898 "Desert Postman" issue with different watermarks shown

== The provisional stamps of 1897 ==
On 1 March 1897, contemporary Egyptian postage stamps, overprinted SOUDAN in French and Arabic, were made available in the post offices. The values which appeared were 1, 2, 3 and 5 milliemes and 1, 2, 5 and 10 piastres. The overprinting was done at the Imprimerie Nationale, Boulaq, Cario, Egypt.

== The Camel issue ==
On 1 March 1898 the so-called “Camel” or “Desert Postman” stamps, printed by Thomas De La Rue & Co were issued. The design of the stamps is based on an original sketch by Colonel E S Stanton C M G, who produced it at the request of Sir Herbert Kitchener. This design continued to be used in Sudan for its definitive stamps until 1948.

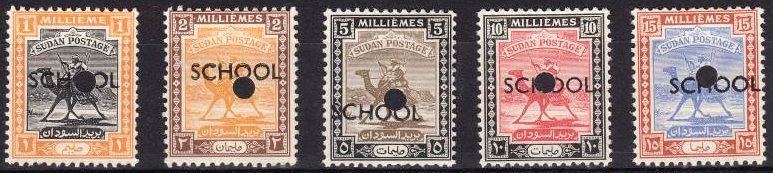
Post office training stamps of Sudan. Overprinted and punched to prevent genuine use.

== Post Office training ==
A number of Sudanese stamps have been overprinted SCHOOL for use at the post office training school.

== Postal stationery ==
The first items of postal stationery to be issued for the Sudan were postcards, post paid envelopes and letter sheets in 1887 and newspaper wrappers in 1898. These were produced by overprinting Egyptian postal stationery. Registration envelopes were first issued in 1908 and aerogrammes were first issued in 1951.

== Telegraph stamps ==
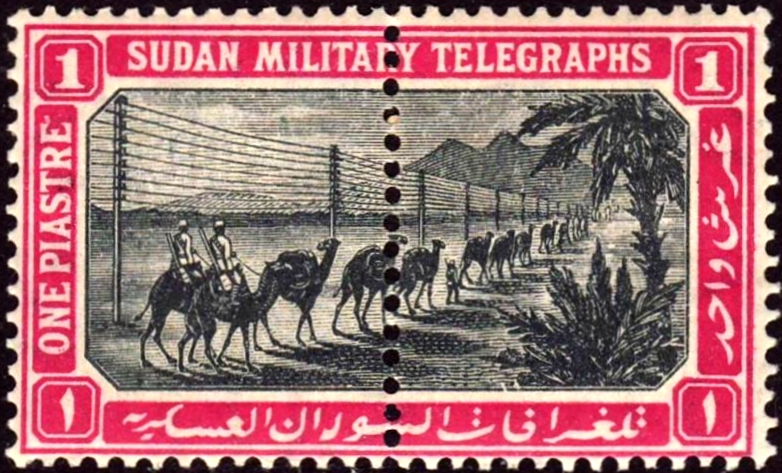
A military telegraph stamp of Sudan from c. 1898

A number of stamps were produced around 1898 for use on military telegraphs. The stamps are in two halves.

== Collecting Sudanese stamps ==
In 1977 the Sudan Study Group (SSG) was founded by a group of dedicated collectors to study the stamps and postal history of Sudan, nowadays including as well the Republic of South Sudan which became independent from Sudan on 9 July 2011. The SSG has a website with information about their activities and publications.

== List of people on the postage stamps of Sudan ==
This is a list of people that have appeared on stamps of Sudan since the issue of the first stamps in 1897.

- Mahatma Gandhi, Indian anti-colonial nationalist (2019)
- John Garang, 1945 - 2005, vice-president of Sudan 2005 and leader Sudan People's Liberation Movement / Army 1983 - 2005. (2008)
- Omar Hassan Ahmad al-Bashir, 7th president of Sudan (2008)
- Mohamed Ahmed Ibn Sayid Abd-Allah, 1844 - 1885, Nubian religious leader and 1st Mahdi (2003)
- Ali Osman Mohammed Taha, Minister of Foreign Affairs 1993 - 1995, Vice-president 1995 - 2011 (2008)
- Az-Zubair Mohammed Salih, Sudanese soldier and politician who died in 1998 in an airplane crash; to commemorate him the *Az-Zubair Prize for Innovation and Scientific Excellence was established. (2002)
- Mohammed Dorra, 1988 - 2000, Palestinian child died in cross fire between Israeli and Palestinian security forces. (2002)
- Abdel Rahman el Mahdi, also transliterated as Abd al-Rahman al-Mahdi, 1885 - 1959, religious and political leader (1997)
- Mohammed Ali Jinnah, founder of Pakistan (1978)
- Hilarion Capucci, Archbishop Melkite Greek Catholic Church and pro-Palestinian activist (1977)
- Abdel Fadil Elmaz, anti-British nationalist involved in the 1924 insurrection (1975)
- Ali Abd al Latif, Sudanese nationalist, played a prominent role in the 1924 Khartoum revolt (1975)
- Gamal Abdel Nasser, 2nd president of Egypt (1973)
- Haile Selassie, emperor of Ethiopia, 1930-1974 (1973)
- Gaafar al-Nimeiry, president of Sudan 1969 - 1985 (1970)
- Abdullahi el Fadel el Mahdi, politician, member Committee of Sovereignty 1964 - 1965 (1968)
- Ahmed Yousif Hashim, 1906 - 1958, nationalistic journalist (1968)
- Mohamed Ahmed el Mardi, 1905 - 1966, a.k.a. Mohammed Ahmed el Mardi, politician, minister of Local Government 1955 (1968)
- Mohammed Nur el Din, a.k.a. Muhammad Nur el Din, 1898 - 1964, politician and Minister of Public Works 1955 (1968)
- Mubarak Zaroug a.k.a. Mubarak Zarroug (1917 - 1965), politician in the 1950s, Leader of the House of Representatives in 1955 and Minister of External Affairs in 1956 (1966)
- El Siddiq el Mahdi, 1911 - 1961, religious leader, son of Abd al-Rahman al-Mahdi (1966)
- Ahmed al-Gurashi Taha, student killed at the University of Khartoum by riot police in October 1964 (1965)
- Tirhaqah a.k.a. Taharqa, pharaoh of Egypt and King of the Kush Kingdom 690 - 664 BC (1961)
- Charles George Gordon, a.k.a. Gordon of Khartoum, British army officer and administrator (1935)

== See also ==
- List of people on stamps of Sudan
- Postage stamps and postal history of South Sudan

== References and sources ==
Sources

- Stanley Gibbons Stamp Catalogue, Part 1, British Commonwealth
