= Unification of Egypt and Sudan =

Political idea

- Flag of the Kingdom of Egypt and Anglo-Egyptian Sudan

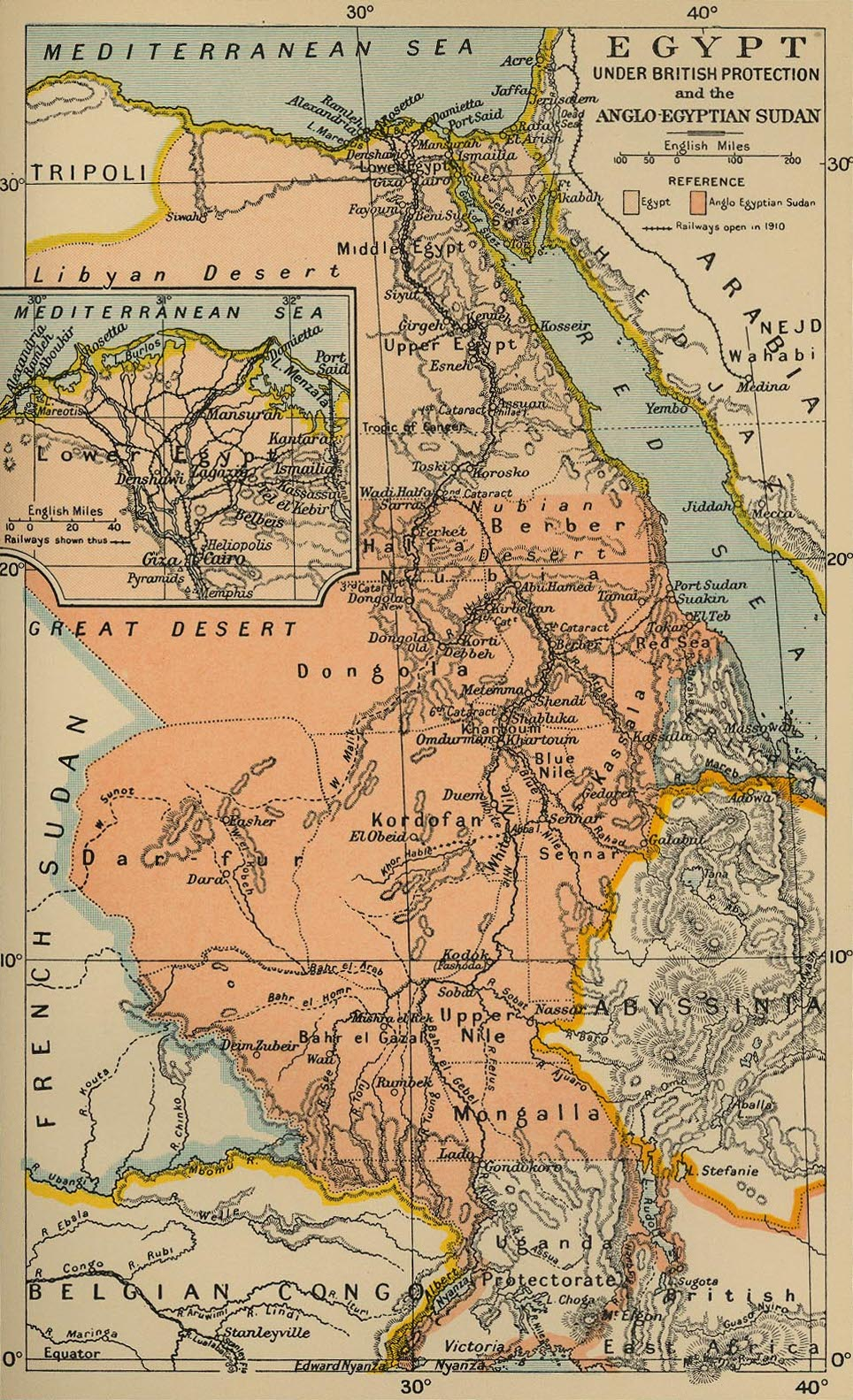
- Egypt and Sudan under British control
- Today part of: Egypt and Sudan

The unification of Egypt and Sudan was a political idea, claiming that Egypt and Sudan were two halves that had been unjustly separated, and were destined to be reunited.

== Background ==
The continued British occupation of Sudan fueled an increasingly strident nationalist backlash in Egypt, with Egyptian nationalist leaders determined to force Britain to recognize a single independent union of Egypt and Sudan. With the formal end in 1914 of the legal fiction of Ottoman sovereignty, Hussein Kamel was declared Sultan of Egypt and Sudan. Upon his death in 1917, his brother Fuad succeeded him as Sultan Fuad I. The insistence of a single Egyptian-Sudanese state persisted when the Sultanate was re-titled the Kingdom of Egypt and Sudan, but the British continued to frustrate these efforts.

In 1922, Britain renounced the protectorate and approved Egypt's declaration of independence. However, the 1923 Egyptian constitution made no claim to Egyptian sovereignty over Sudan. Subsequent negotiations in London between the British and the new Egyptian government foundered on the Sudan question.

Inflamed by the failure of the talks, nationalists rioted in Egypt and in Sudan where a minority supported union with Egypt. In November 1924, Sir Lee Stack, governor-general of Sudan and Sirdar, was assassinated in Cairo. Britain ordered all Egyptian troops, civil servants, and public employees withdrawn from Sudan. In 1925, Khartoum formed the 4,500-man Sudan Defence Force (SDF) under Sudanese officers to replace Egyptian units.

Even when the British ended their occupation of Egypt in 1936 (with the exception of the Suez Canal Zone), they maintained their forces in Sudan. Successive governments in Cairo, repeatedly declaring their abrogation of the condominium agreement, declared the British presence in Sudan to be illegitimate, and insisted on full British recognition of King Farouk as "King of Egypt and the Sudan", a recognition which the British were loath to grant, not least because Farouk was secretly negotiating with Mussolini for an Italian invasion.

== White Flag League ==
Lieutenant Ali Abd Al-Latif's 1922 "Claim of the Sudanese Nation" article in the al-Hadarah called for Sudanese self-determination, more education, an end to the sugar monopoly, and higher posts for Sudanese in the Anglo-Egyptian administration, leading to his imprisonment. Upon his release, he and other nationalists intensified efforts to mobilise against colonial rule, culminating in a revolutionary agenda that symbolised the growing momentum of Sudan's independence movement.

Flag of the White Flag League

Internal divisions arose in the League of Sudanese Union, and in 1923, some members, including Obaid Haj al-Amin, left the League, believing verbal dissent was insufficient. They joined the newly created White Flag League, led by figures such as Ali Abd Al-Latif, Lieutenant Abdullah Khalil, and First Lieutenant Abdel Fadil Elmaz, which took a more radical stance against British rule, while advocated for "Unity of the Nile Valley," calling for Sudanese independence and unity with Egypt and pledging allegiance to King Fuad.

The 1924 White Flag League movement, led by Sudanese nationalists, marked the first organised resistance against British colonial rule. Initially involving military officers and graduates from the Omdurman Graduates' Club, the movement began with urban demonstrations in June 1924. Protesters in cities like Khartoum, Omdurman, and Port Sudan called for the downfall of British rule and expressed solidarity with Egypt, raising anti-colonial slogans and the Egyptian flag. These activities led to the imprisonment of the movement's leader, Ali Abd Al-Latif, on 4 July 1924, which only intensified protests under the leadership of Obaid Haj Al-Amin.

British soldiers forcefully put down these revolts, and on 19 November 1924, when Sir Lee Stack was assassinated in Cairo, demonstrations in Khartoum led to a rising on 27 November. It was led by Muslim conscript soldiers, southerners Ali Abd al Latif and Abdel Fadil Elmaz, and national postal clerk Obaid Haj al-Amin. The British crushed the White Flag League, expelling Egyptians from Sudan, and curbing the educated Sudanese. The two largest religious groups, the Mahdist led Umma Party and the Khatmiyya Democratic Unionist Party evolved as mass political organizations. The educated classes had two factions. One was led by Shaykh Ahmad al Sayyid al Fil, supported by "Ali al Mirghani of the Khatmryya, and the other group grew around Muhammad Ali Shawq and had Abd al Rahman al Mahdi's sympathy. The Khatmriyya advocated "Unity of the Nile Valley', while the Ansar called for "Sudan for Sudanese".

== Unity of the Nile Valley ==
The "Unity of the Nile Valley" (Arabic: وحدة وادي النيل, romanized: wahda wadi al-nil), was a prominent anti-imperialist theme in Sudan and Egypt until the 1950s. Its ideologues did not postulate that Sudan and Egypt were one nation, but that they were two halves that had been unjustly separated but were destined to be reunited. For the Egyptians, sharing the river Nile made Sudan a natural appendix of Egypt, while for many Sudanese, Egypt was a "blood brother" with which they shared a set of fundamental national traits.

Despite the failure of earlier pro-unity attempts in the Sudan, the slogan gradually gained power until in 1953 the pro-unity political party won an overwhelming victory in the first self-government elections in the Sudan. Despite this, the Sudan soon declared its separate independence. Since then, union with Egypt has been discussed and proposed at various times, but has never regained its former relevance.
