= Salomo of Makuria =

Salomo or Solomon (1080 – 1089) was a ruler of the Nubian kingdom of Makuria.

According to contemporary accounts, Salomo abdicated his throne and went to live at the church of al-Wadi, occupying himself in prayer and religious devotion. His activities came to the attention of the governor of Upper Egypt, Sa'd al-Dawla al-Qawwasi, who passed the information along to the Vizier Amir al-Juyush, Badr al-Jamali. The Vizier sent men to bring the former king to whom the Vizier gave a fine house and sought his opinion on many topics. After living for a year with the Vizier, Salomo died and was buried at the monastery of St George in Khandaq, the suburb of Cairo. However, P. L. Shinnie identifies Khandaq with the settlement El Khandaq, which Shinnie notes has abundant Christian ruins, although the remains of this specific monastery have not been identified.

Preceded by Georgios III	King of Makuria	Succeeded by Basileios
