= Esna =

Esna إسنا ⲥⲛⲏ, ⲉⲥⲛⲏ
- City
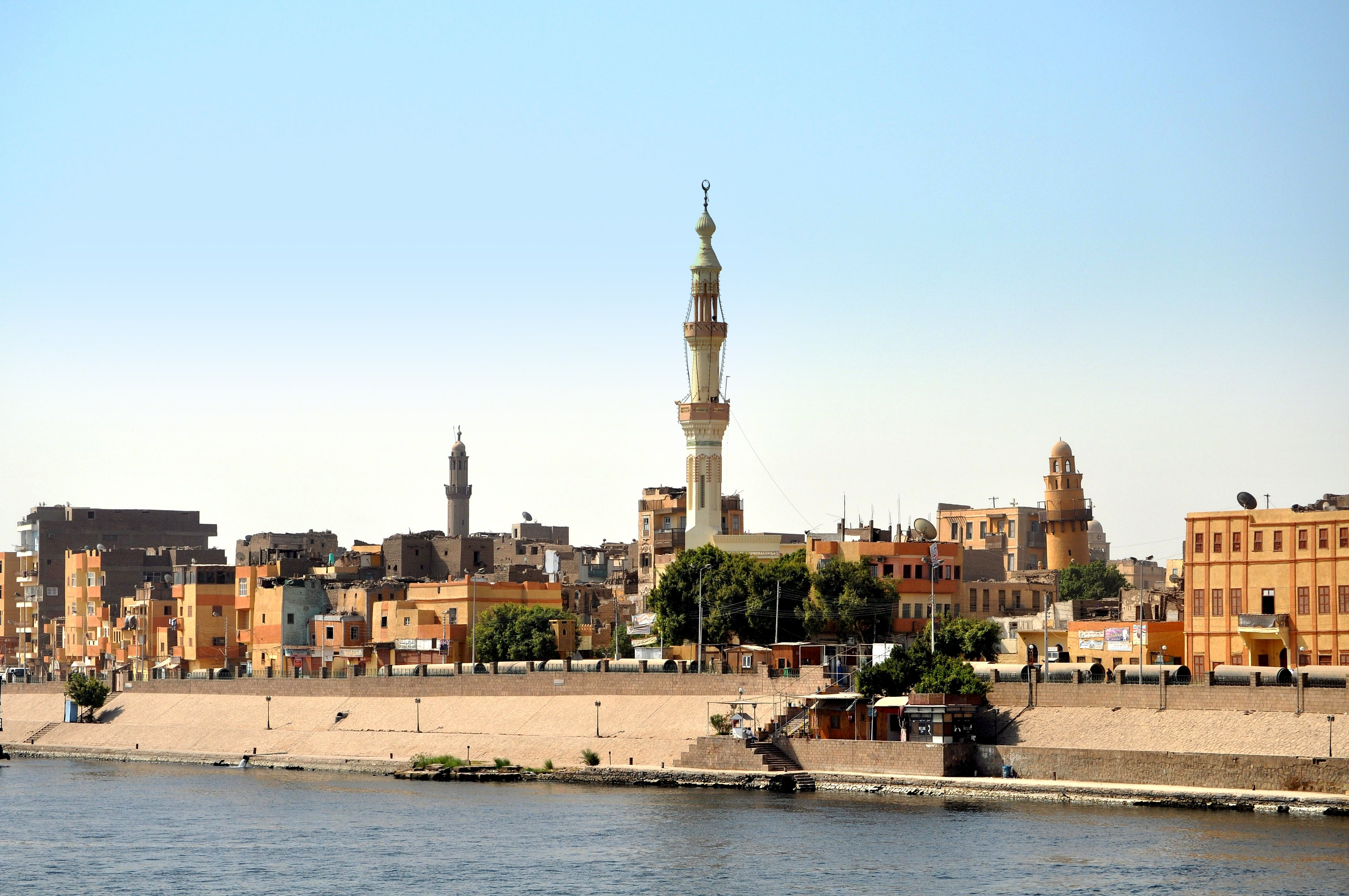
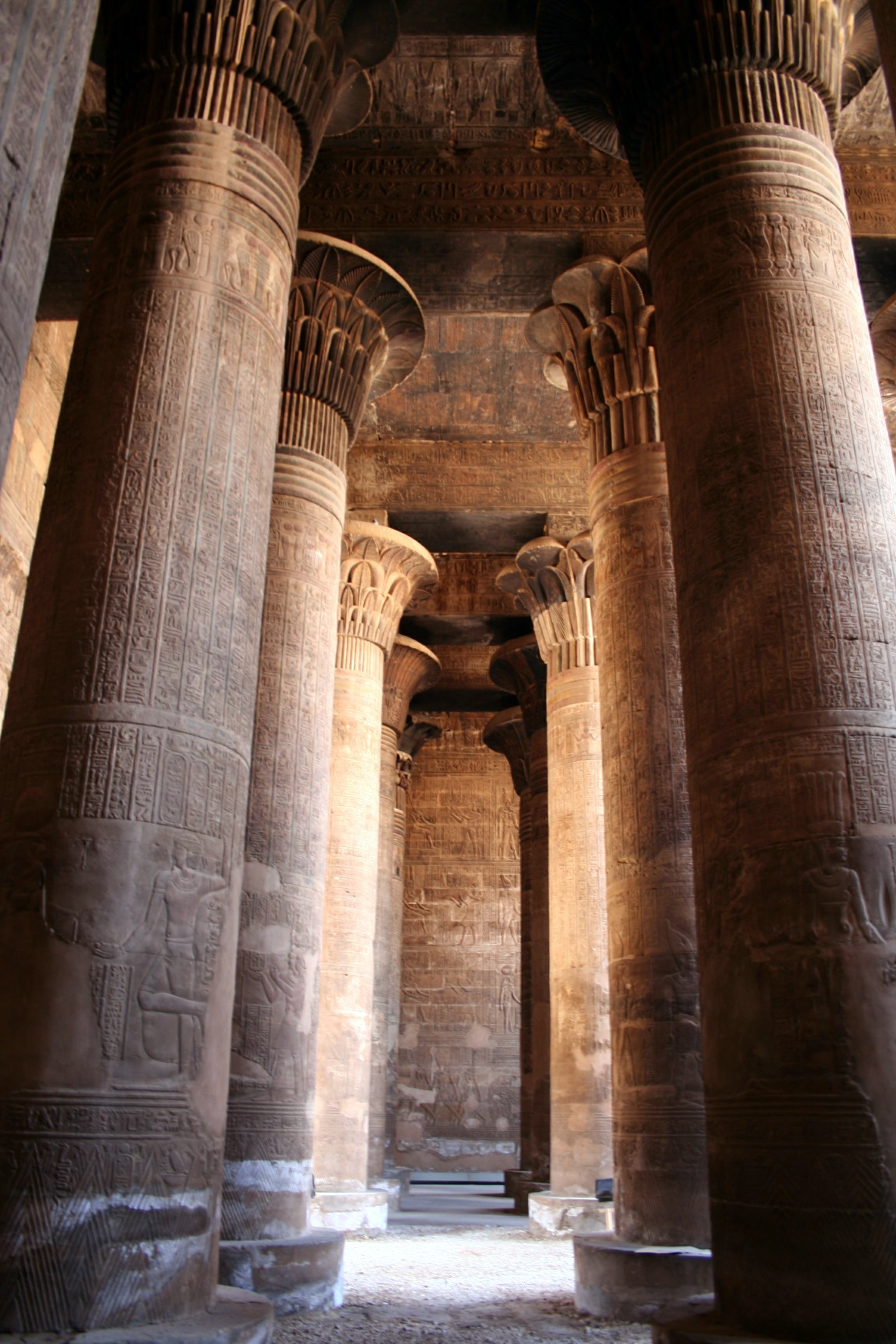
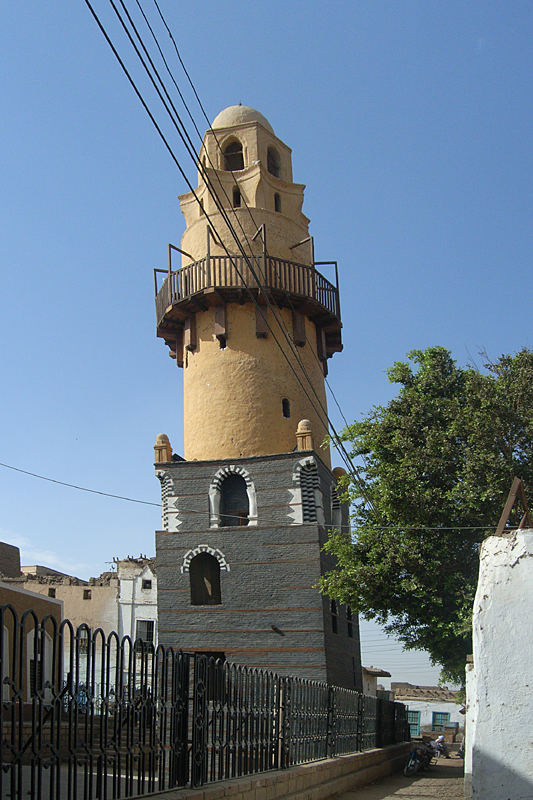
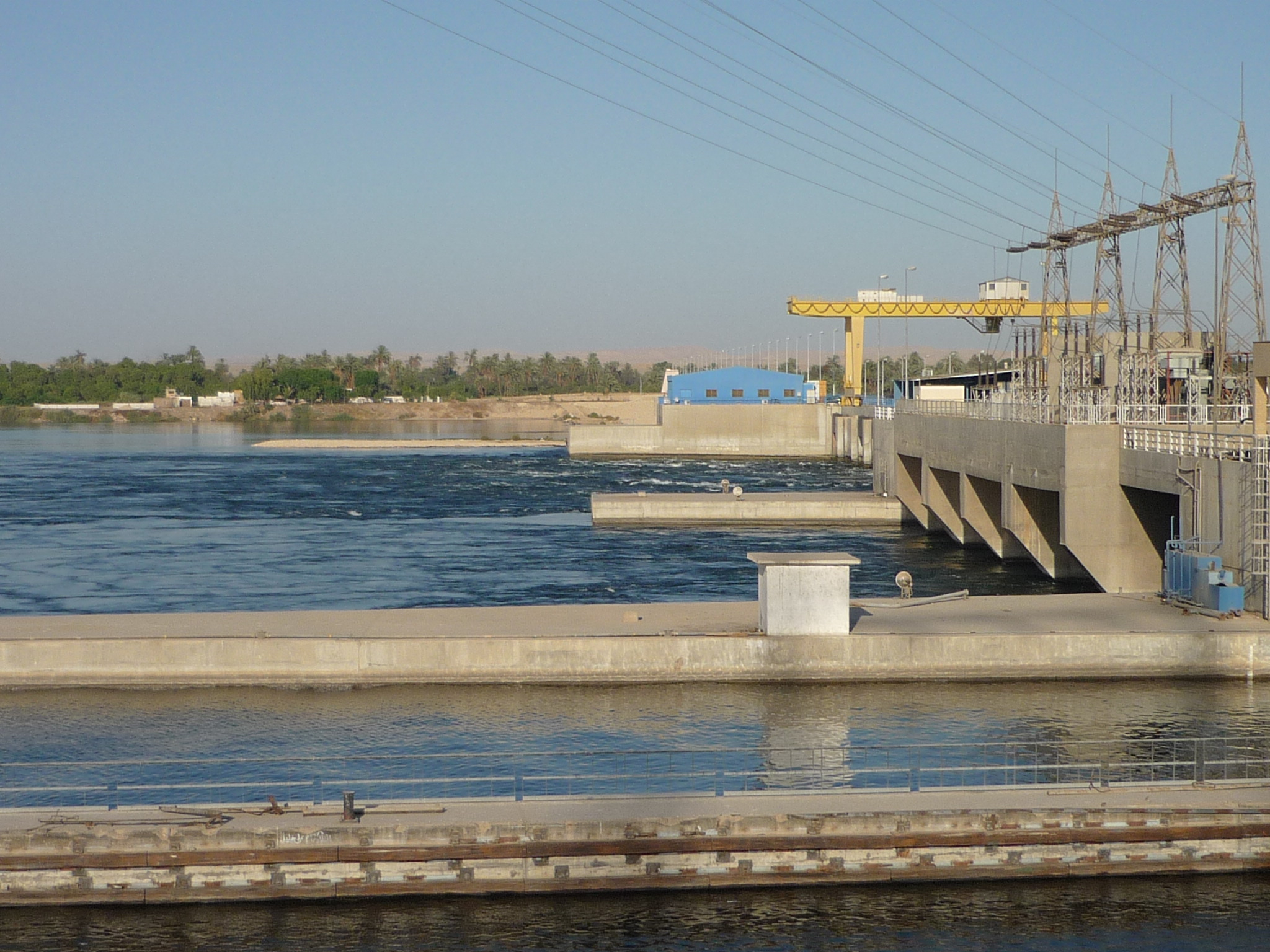
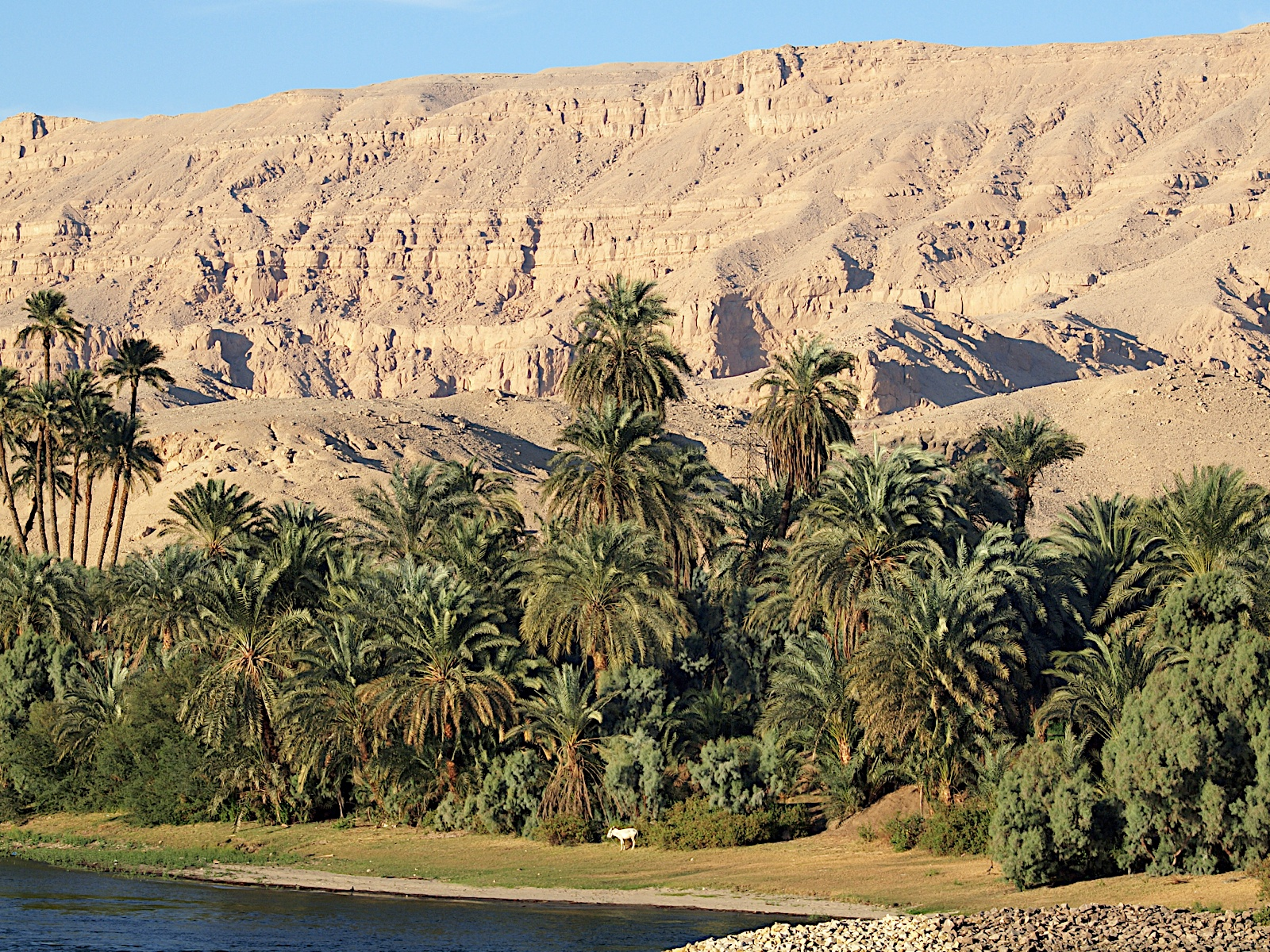
- From top left: Corniche of Old Esna, inside Khnum Temple, Minaret of Esna Mosque, Esna new docks, farmland near Esna

- Location in Egypt
- Coordinates: 25°18′N 32°33′E
- Country: Egypt
- Governorate: Luxor

Area
  - City: 7.3 sq mi (19 km^{2})
  - Urban: 154.4 sq mi (399.9 km^{2})

Population (2023)
  - City: 102,697
  - Density: 14,000/sq mi (5,400/km^{2})
  - Urban: 475,034
  - Urban density: 3,077/sq mi (1,188/km^{2})
- Time zone: UTC+2 (EET)
  - Summer (DST): UTC+3 (EEST)

Esna (Arabic: إسنا IPA: [ˈʔesnæ], Ancient Egyptian: jwny.t or tꜣ-snt; Coptic: ⲥⲛⲏ or ⲉⲥⲛⲏ Snē from tꜣ-snt; Koine Greek: Λατόπολις Latópolis or πόλις Λάτων (Pólis Látōn) or Λάττων (Lattōn); Latin: Lato) is a city in Egypt. It is located on the west bank of the Nile some 55 km (34 mi) south of Luxor. The city was formerly part of the modern Qena Governorate, but as of 9 December 2009, it was incorporated into the new Luxor Governorate.

== Latopolis ==
iwn n i i t niwt
jwnj(t)
in hieroglyphs
Era: New Kingdom
(1550–1069 BC)

z n y t niwt
snj(t)
in hieroglyphs
Era: Late Period
(664–332 BC)

This city of Latopolis (πόλις Λάτων) in the Thebaid of Upper Egypt should not be confused with the more northerly city of Letopolis (Λητοῦς Πόλις), ancient Khem, modern Ausim, in the Nile Delta in Lower Egypt.

== Ancient city ==
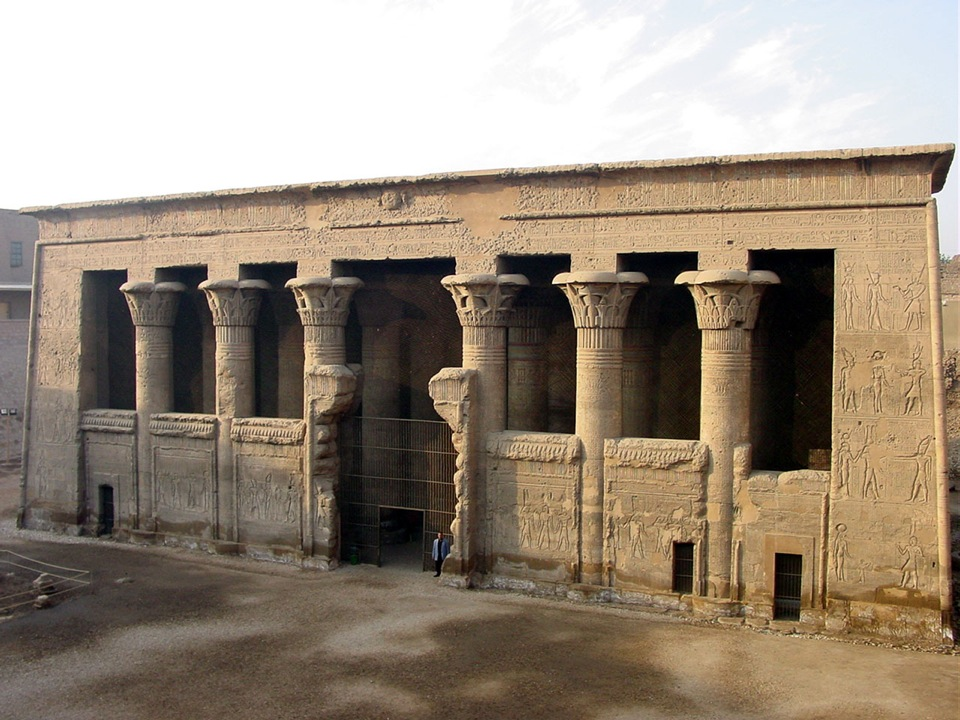
The Temple of Khnum at Esna

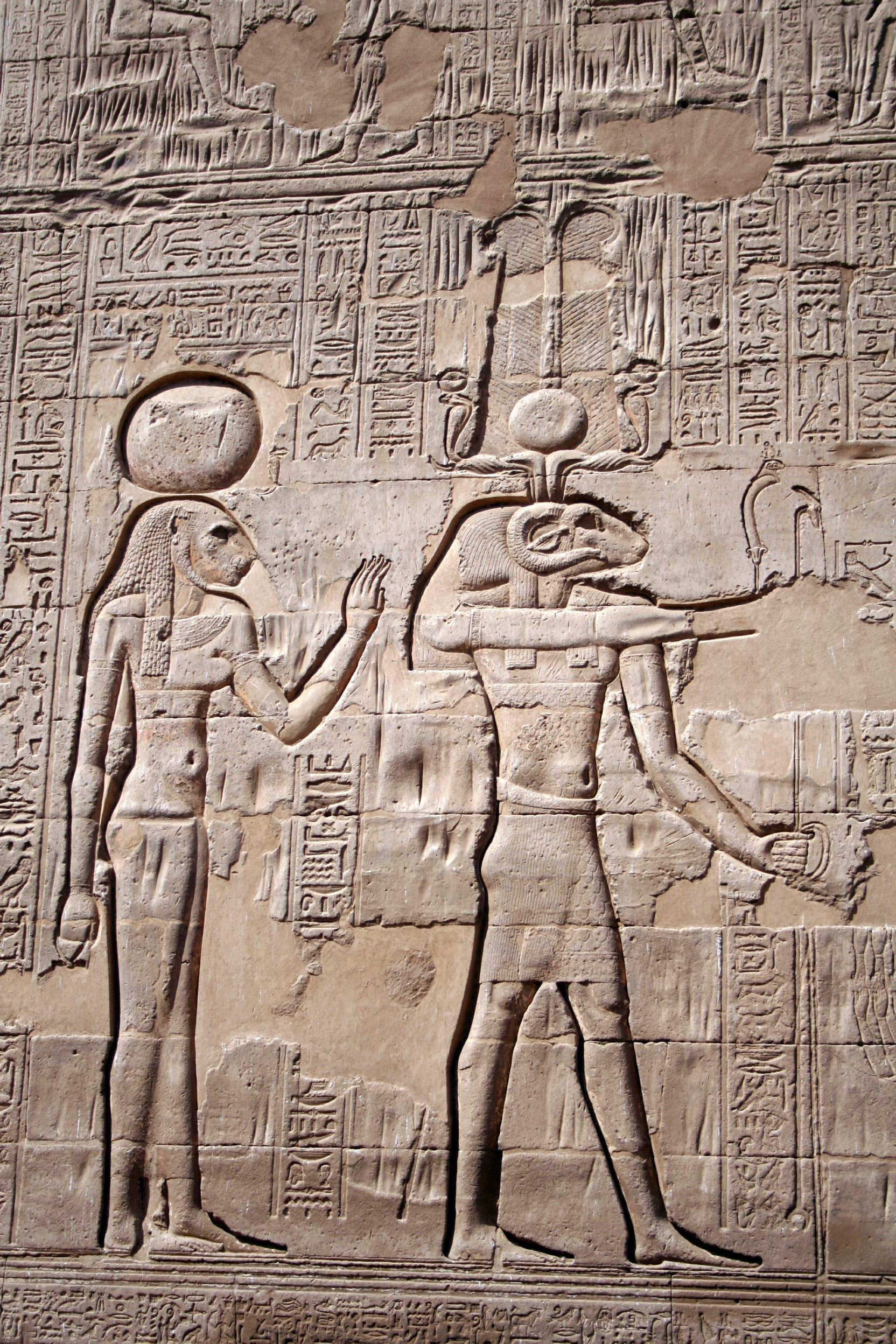
Reliefs showing Khnum with his consort Menhit from the Temple of Esna

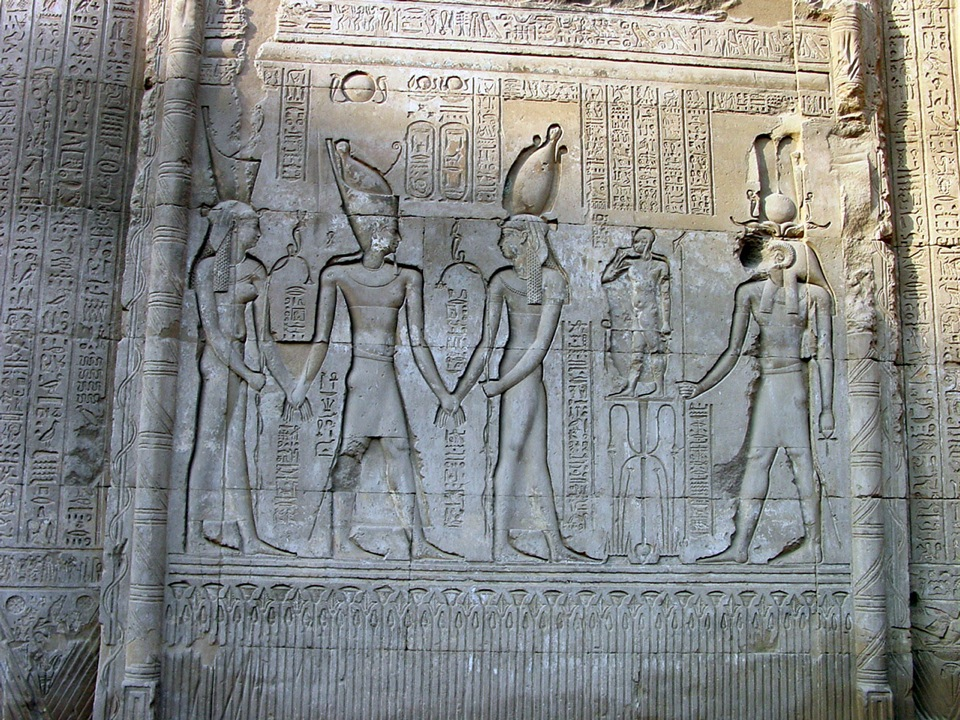
Wall reliefs from the Temple of Esna

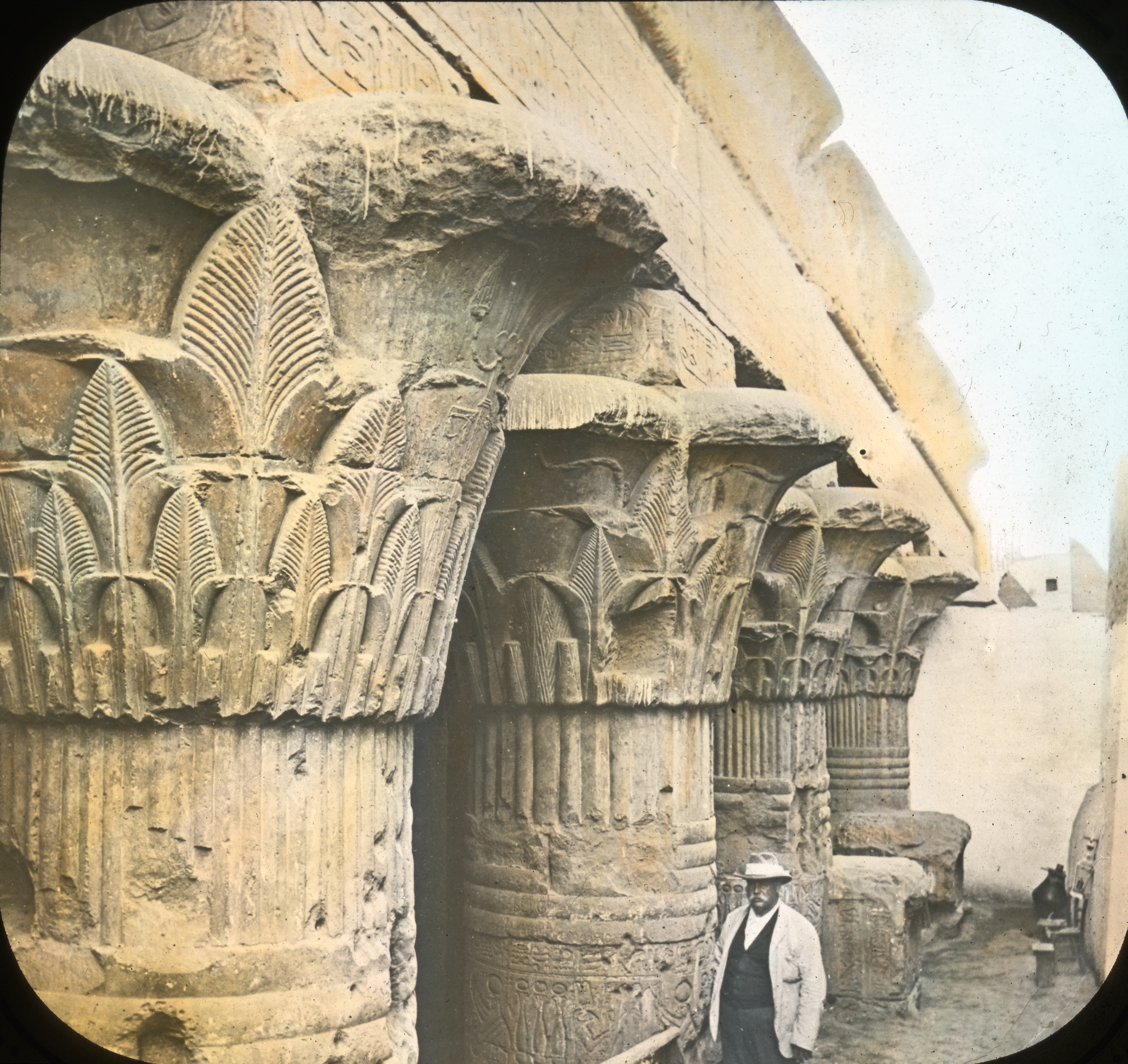
Lantern Slide Collection: Views, Objects: Egypt. Columns in Temple of Esneh., n.d., Brooklyn Museum Archives

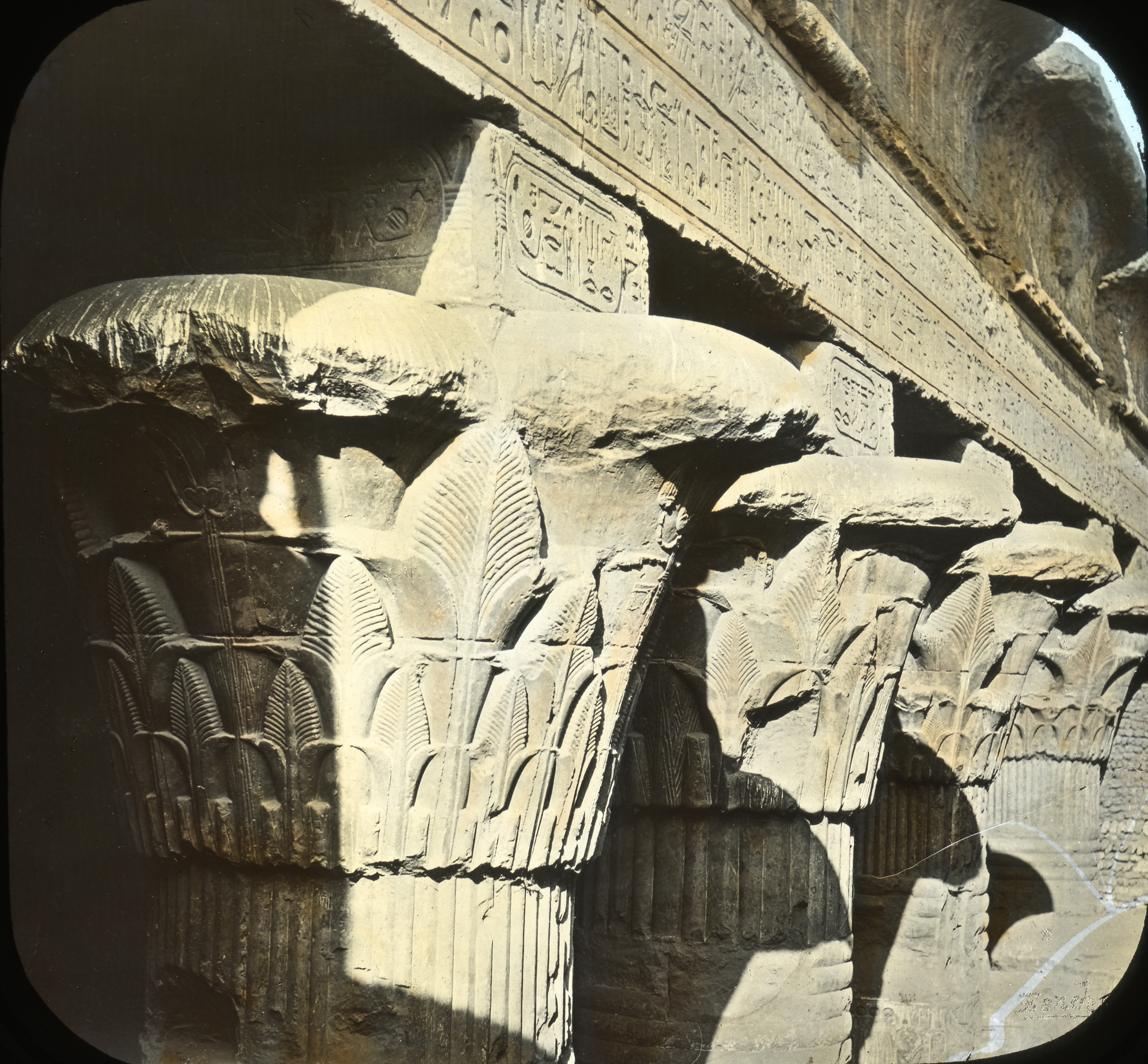
Lantern Slide Collection: Views, Objects: Egypt - Columns in Temple of Esneh., n.d., Brooklyn Museum Archives

In Arabic: iwan-iyyah (إيوان-ية) in New Kingdom and (زين-ية) in Late Period.

The name "Latopolis" is in honor of the Nile perch, Lates niloticus, the largest of the 52 species which inhabit the Nile, which was abundant in these stretches of the river in ancient times, and which appears in sculptures, among the symbols of the goddess Neith, associated by the ancient Greeks as Pallas-Athene, surrounded by the oval shield or ring indicative of royalty or divinity. Held sacred, the Lates niloticus was buried in a cemetery west of the town.

The temple of Esna, dedicated to the god Khnum, his consorts Menhit and Nebtu, their son, Heka, and the goddess Neith, was remarkable for the beauty of its site and the magnificence of its architecture. It was built of red sandstone, and its portico consisted of six rows of four columns each, with lotus-leaf capitals, all of which however differ from each other. The temple contains very late hieroglyphic inscription, dating from the reign of Decius (249–251 AD).

Another temple of the same period has been identified at Kom Mer, about 12 km to the south, but cannot be excavated because a modern village is built over it.

There was a smaller temple, dedicated to the triad of Latopolis, about two miles and a half north of the city, at a village now called el-Dayr. Here, too, is a small zodiac of the age of Ptolemy III Euergetes (246–221 BC). This latter building was destroyed in the 19th century, as it stood in the way of a new canal. The temple of Esna was cleared of the soil and rubbish which filled its area when Vivant Denon visited it, and served as a cotton warehouse in the mid-19th century.

With the exception of the jamb of a gateway—now converted into a door-sill—of the reign of Thutmose II (Eighteenth Dynasty), the remains of Latopolis belong to the Ptolemaic or Roman eras. Ptolemy III Euergetes, the restorer of so many temples in Upper Egypt, was a benefactor to Latopolis, and he is depicted upon the walls of its temple followed by a tame lion, and in the act of striking down the chiefs of his enemies. The name of Ptolemy V Epiphanes is found also inscribed upon a doorway. Although the scale of the ruins are impressive, their sculptures and hieroglyphics attest to the decline of Egyptian art. The west wall features reliefs of Ptolemy VI Philometor and Ptolemy VIII Physcon. The pronaos, which alone exists, resembles in style that of Apollonopolis Magna (Edfu), and was begun not earlier than the reign of Claudius (41–54 AD), and completed in that of Vespasian, whose name and titles are carved on the dedicatory inscription over the entrance. On the ceiling of the pronaos is the larger Latopolitan Zodiac. The name of the emperor Geta, the last ruler that can be read in hieroglyphics, although partially erased by his brother and murderer Caracalla (212), is still legible on the walls of Latopolis. Before raising their own edifice, the Romans seem to have destroyed even the basements of the earlier Egyptian temple. The ceremonial way, which probably linked the quay to the temple, has disappeared. The quay bears cartouches of Marcus Aurelius.

The cemetery west of the town, where the Lates niloticus was buried, also contains human burials dating from the Middle Kingdom to the Late Period.

=== Ritual significance ===
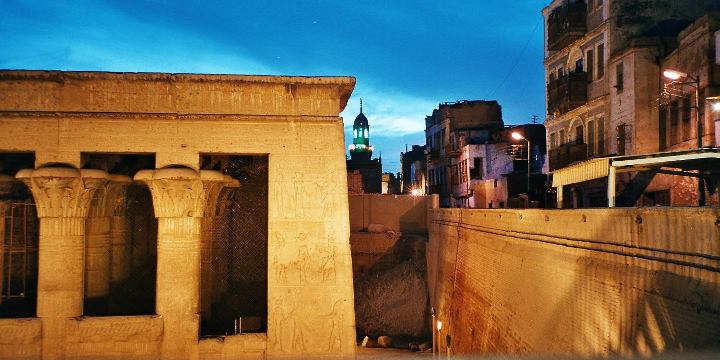
Twilight over the temple

The Temple of Esna conveys a sense of the importance which the Ancient Egyptians placed upon their places of worship. All Egyptians who entered the confines of an Egyptian temple were required "to comply with the strict rules regarding ritual purity." According to inscriptions carved on the walls of the Temple of Esna, those who entered this temple were expected to fastidiously cut their fingernails and toenails, remove other body hair, wash their hands with natron (a natural occurring salt), "be dressed in linen (they were forbidden from wearing wool), and not to have had sexual intercourse for several days."

==== Medieval heritage city ====
Esna enjoys a rich heritage in its unique social structure; The city center is subdivided into spatial domains inhabited by deeply-rooted Esna families, and its traditional crafts, many on the verge of extinction, have been a tradition since the medieval era. There are other monuments and buildings of historic significance in Esna from various eras such as Wekalet Al-Geddawy, a caravanserai from the Ottoman era, established in the 18th century by the ruler Hassan El-Geddawy and named after him. It is one of three caravanserais in the south of Egypt, and it is the only one that still maintains its unique original design. The Wekala was one of the most important trade centers in southern Egypt in the 18th century, with traders from all over Africa coming through the west desert and the Red Sea, and stands as a testament to the strength of trade and the strategic position of Esna as a trade center at the time. The building was historically used for the sale of slaves, animals, crops and crafts.

The historic market is one of a few still standing markets in the south of Egypt and is significant for its place in Esna's local life. Products sold in the market include home supplies, local crafts and bridal needs.

El-Amry Minaret, built in 1081 by Sa'd al-Dawla al-Qawwasi, is the only remaining part of the historic mosque with the same name which was torn down and rebuilt in the 1960s in a modern style. The mosque was established between the years 474 and 476 hijri (1081 to 1084 AD) by Badr El Deen Gamaly and it was the first to be built in Esna in the Fatimid Era. The oil press has belonged to the family of Bakour for over 200 years and it is the only oil press still standing in Esna.

The Martyrs' Monastery was established in the 6th century. The monastery is significant for Christians since it was established by Saint Helena to commemorate a battle between the Romans and Coptic Egyptians which led to the death of 3600 martyrs during the age of Christian persecution in Egypt. The battle was led by the Roman emperor Diocletian who started an attack against Christians in Egypt. On the day of the Martyrs' Massacre, an attack was started that caused the Bishop of the city of Esna, Father Ammonius, to flee with the whole Christian population to the monastery to hide there from the troops of the emperor however they were later found there and killed. The monastery is visited by thousands of Egyptians every year.

==== Al-Qīsāriyya Market ====
The public open space located between Khnum Temple and al-'Amriyya Minaret functioned as Esna's main square. Historic photos of Esna depict this area as the city's main marketplace. Wekalet Al-Geddawy caravanserai, one of the city's main trading buildings, is on this square as well. To the north and south of the square, al-Qīsāriyya Street extended parallel to the Nile River for a distance of almost 1.5 km (0.93 mi). The street is named after Esna's renowned al-Qīsāriyya Market.

Qīsāriyyas are an urban market typology that is believed to have existed since the Roman times; possibly since the age of the Roman emperor Augustus Caesar (63 B.C.–14 A.D.) They consist of a long and narrow covered street, and sometimes a network of streets, that exist in the heart of a city. The street is surrounded by two- and three-story buildings on both sides; shops and workshops are on the ground floor directly opening to the street. The upper floors include living quarters, sometimes for traders visiting the city. Wakālas (caravanserais), exist along or close to this street. Such street markets are known for traditional goods such as textiles, spices, and traditional clothing. Qīsāriyyas exist in many Upper Egyptian cities such as Asyūt, Sūhaj, Qenā and Esna; and they continue to function as popular local markets. Al-Qīsāriyya Market in Esna is one of the city's main attractions, not only for tourists but to a greater extent, for residents of Esna and its surrounding villages. It plays a regional trade function as the hub for many commercial activities. It includes different trades and goods such as textiles, clothing, houseware, haberdashery, tailoring, upholstery, etc. Hence, it is a major destination for families preparing for marriage and new brides.

Esna's Qīsāriyya Market consists of two main parts. The northern part starts from Wekalet Al-Geddawy, passing by the Church of Mother Dūlāji, and heading northward. It gets busier in its northern edge, covered with modern elements, since it is close to Esna's public transportation hub. Along this part of the street, many architecturally significant buildings dating back to the turn of the twentieth century exist. It also includes, tucked in a small alleyway, the façade of Bayt al-Shabrāwī, built in 1874 with its intricate decorative fired brick and woodwork. On Saturdays, the northern part of al-Qīsāriyya is even more lively since it merges with Esna's weekly Saturday Market, famous for local food and for clay tableware.

The southern part starts from the south side of Khnum Temple. This part is quieter. It still maintains its traditional wooden cover and is surrounded by mud brick buildings with traditional features, such as colorful wooden doors. This covered part of the market extends for a distance of almost 130 m (425 feet) from the Khnum Temple area to many of Esna's attractions such as the traditional Bakkūr Oil Press, the Church of the Blessed Virgin Mary and many of the city's architecturally significant buildings. There are more than 120 local shops, mostly traditional tailors making garments such as jalābiyyas, and selling textiles including women's traditional fabrics and shawls indigenous to Esna such as al-Ḥabra, al-Farkha and al-Nishra. This southern part of al-Qīsāriyya Market still includes the remains of a traditional wakāla, accessed through one of the textile shops. The market's traditional wooden cover in addition to its direction from north to south provides a cool breeze.

== Modern Esna ==
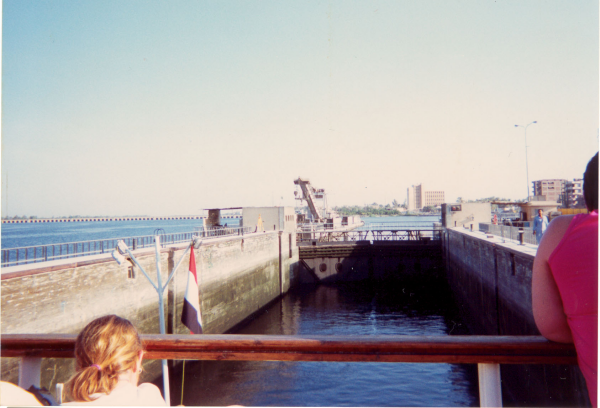
Canal lock

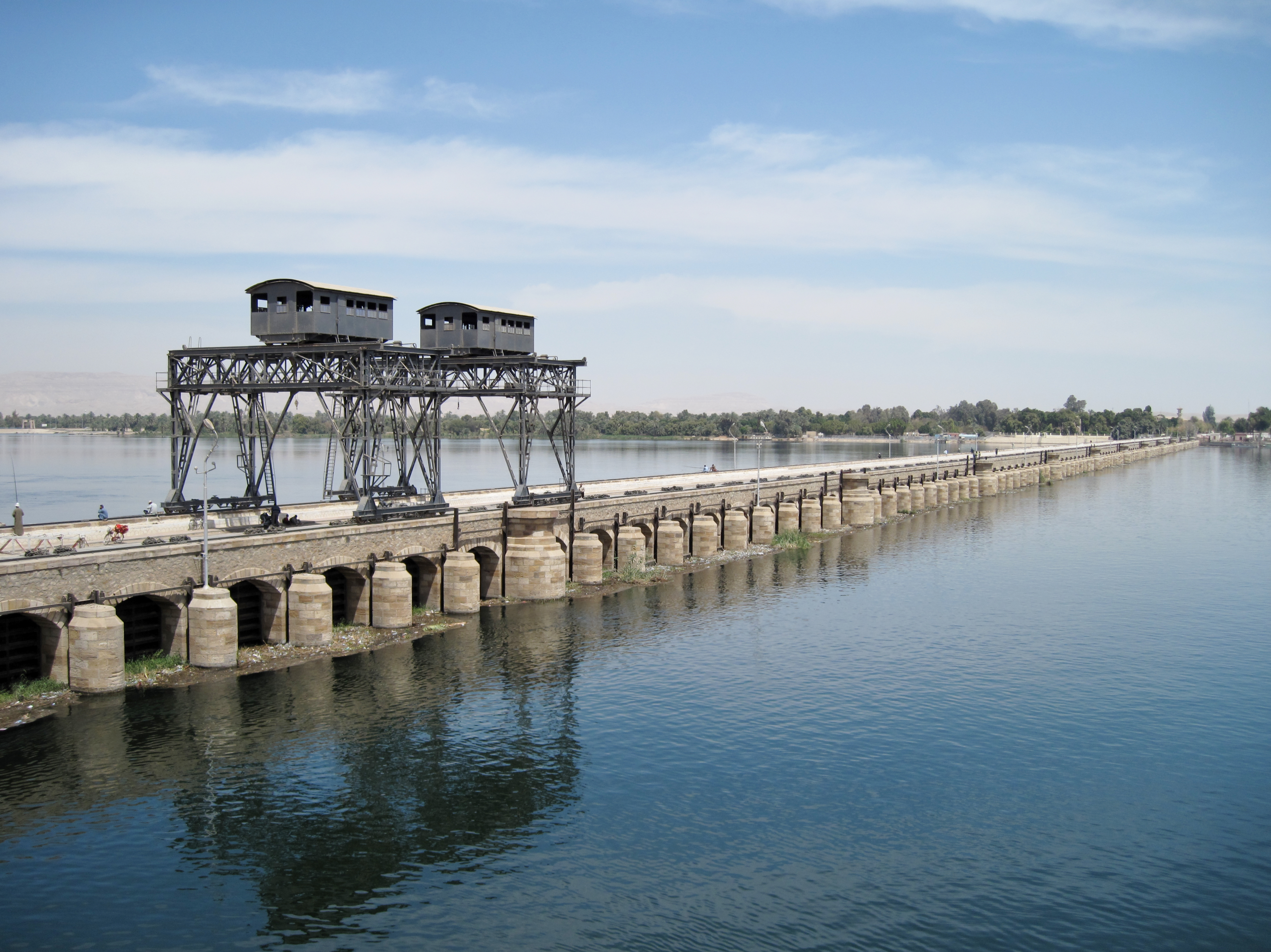
Dam of Esna

Two barrage bridges straddle the Nile at this point: one built by the British in 1906, and the "Electricity Bridge" built in the 1990s. Ships, particularly Nile cruisers ferrying tourists from Luxor to Aswan 155 km (96 mi) further upstream, can be held up for hours while they negotiate their way through the lock system.

The two main points of interest in Esna are its lively tourist-oriented market, which fills a couple of streets leading inland from the corniche. The other is the temple of Esna. The temple, which has only been partially excavated, is about 200 meters (660 ft) from the river and some 9 meters (30 ft) below street level.

=== 2017 attack ===
An attack on a police patrol killed a policeman and a civilian, and wounded three other people.

=== Former bishopric ===
Under the older name of "Latopolis," the city is now a Roman Catholic Latin titular see. It is sometimes confused with the titular Diocese of Letopolis in modern Ausim, a suffragan of Hermopolis Parva.

== Geography ==
The city is located on the west bank of the Nile some 55 km (34 mi) south of Luxor.

=== Climate ===
Köppen-Geiger climate classification system classifies its climate as hot desert climate (BWh).

Climate data for Esna
Month	Jan	Feb	Mar	Apr	May	Jun	Jul	Aug	Sep	Oct	Nov	Dec	Year
Mean daily maximum °C (°F)	23.4 (74.1)	25.5 (77.9)	29.5 (85.1)	34.8 (94.6)	39.2 (102.6)	40.8 (105.4)	40.9 (105.6)	41 (106)	38.4 (101.1)	35.7 (96.3)	30.3 (86.5)	25.2 (77.4)	33.7 (92.7)
Daily mean °C (°F)	14.9 (58.8)	16.5 (61.7)	20.2 (68.4)	25.3 (77.5)	29.9 (85.8)	31.6 (88.9)	32.1 (89.8)	32.3 (90.1)	30 (86)	27.1 (80.8)	21.6 (70.9)	16.7 (62.1)	24.8 (76.7)
Mean daily minimum °C (°F)	6.4 (43.5)	7.5 (45.5)	11 (52)	15.9 (60.6)	20.6 (69.1)	22.5 (72.5)	23.4 (74.1)	23.6 (74.5)	21.6 (70.9)	18.6 (65.5)	12.9 (55.2)	8.3 (46.9)	16.0 (60.9)
Average precipitation mm (inches)	0 (0)	0 (0)	0 (0)	0 (0)	0 (0)	0 (0)	0 (0)	0 (0)	0 (0)	0 (0)	0 (0)	0 (0)	0 (0)
Source: Climate-Data.org

== See also ==
- List of cities and towns in Egypt
