= History of the Anglo-Egyptian Sudan =

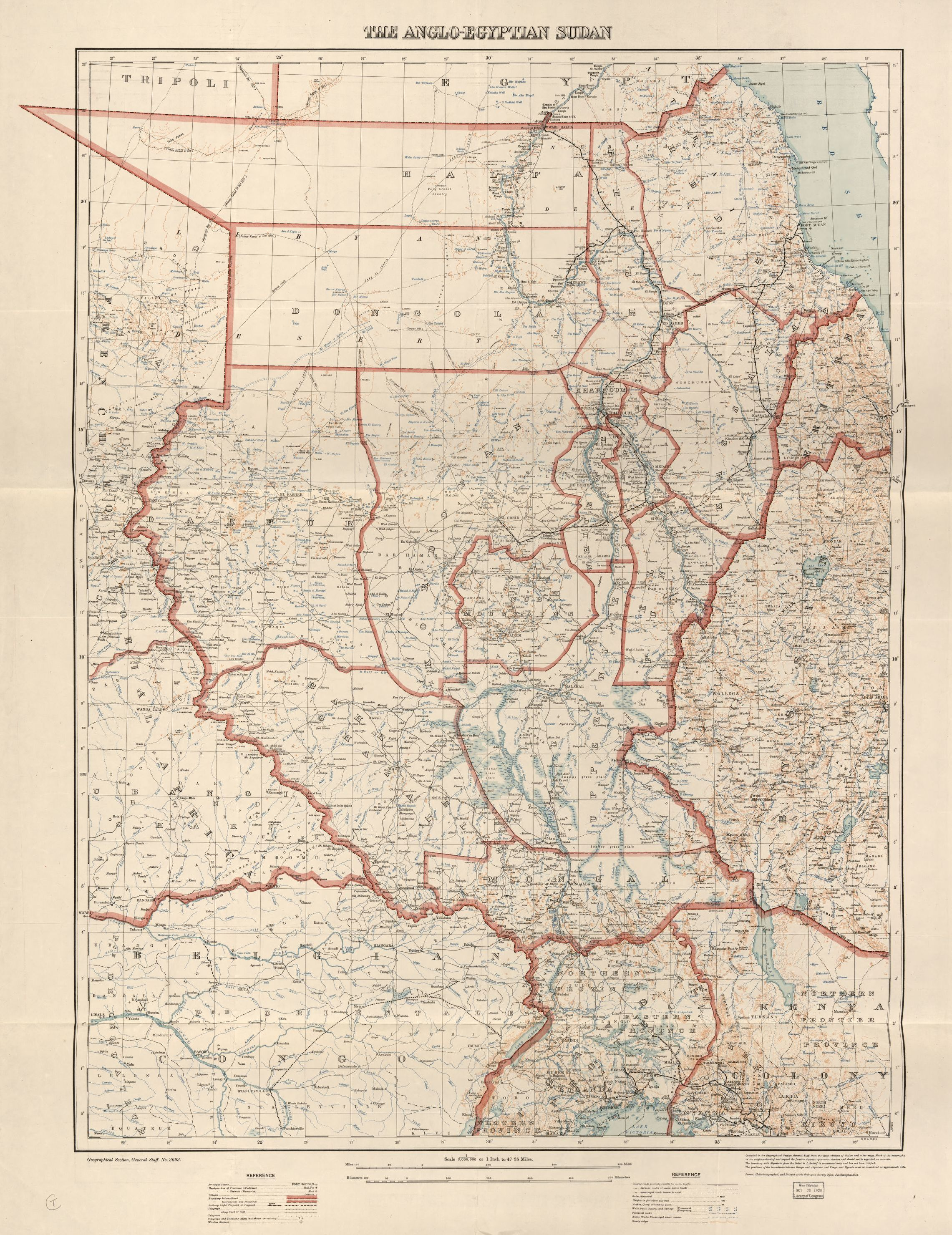
Projected or proposed railways and international boundary lines of Anglo-Egyptian Sudan

In January 1899, an agreement between the United Kingdom the Khedivate of Egypt restored Egyptian rule in Sudan but as part of a condominium, or joint authority, exercised by the two countries. The agreement designated territory south of the twenty-second parallel as the Anglo-Egyptian Sudan. Although it emphasized Egypt's indebtedness to Britain for its participation in the reconquest, the agreement failed to clarify the juridical relationship between the two condominium powers in Sudan or to provide a legal basis for continued British governing of the territory on behalf of the Khedive. Article III of the agreement specified that:

the supreme military and civil command in Sudan shall be vested in one officer, termed the Governor-General of Sudan. He shall be appointed by Khedival Decree on the recommendation of Her Britannic Majesty's Government and shall be removed only by Khedival Decree with the consent of Her Britannic Majesty's Government.

The British governor-general, who was a military officer, reported to the Foreign Office through its resident agent in Cairo. In practice, however, he exercised extraordinary powers and directed the condominium government from Khartoum as if it were a colonial administration. Sir Reginald Wingate succeeded Kitchener as governor-general in 1899.

In each province, two inspectors and several district commissioners aided the British governor (mudir). Initially, nearly all administrative personnel were British Army officers attached to the Egyptian Army. In 1901, however, civilian administrators started arriving in Sudan from Britain and formed the nucleus of the Sudan Political Service. Egyptians filled middle-level posts while Sudanese gradually acquired lower-level positions.

== Condominium period ==
The British established formal control over Sudan on 19 January 1899 under an agreement to establish a condominium, Sudan was governed by an Egyptian appointed administrators on the recommendation and consent of the British government, the governor-general and provincial governors exercised a great deal of freedom in governing Sudan. After 1910, however, an executive council, whose approval was required for all legislation and for budgetary matters, assisted the governor-general.

The governor-general presided over this council, which included the inspector-general; the civil, legal, and financial secretaries; the General Officer Commanding the Troops (The Kaid); and two to four other British officials appointed by the governor-general. From 1944 to 1948 there existed also an advisory council for northern Sudan whose functions were advice and consultation. This advisory council had 18 members representing province councils, 10 members nominated by the Governor-General and 2 honorary members. The executive council retained legislative authority until 1948.

=== Law and order ===
After restoring order and the government's authority, the British dedicated themselves to creating a modern government in the condominium. Jurists adopted penal and criminal procedural codes similar to those in force in British India. Commissions established land tenure rules and adjusted claims in dispute because of grants made by successive governments. Taxes on land remained the basic form of taxation, the amount assessed depending on the type of irrigation, the number of date palms, and the size of herds; however, the rate of taxation was fixed for the first time in Sudan's history.

The 1902 Code of Civil Procedure continued the Ottoman separation of civil law and sharia, but it also created guidelines for the operation of sharia courts as an autonomous judicial division under a chief qadi appointed by the governor-general. Religious judges and other sharia court officials were invariably Egyptian.

There was little resistance to the condominium. Breaches of the peace usually took the form of intertribal warfare or banditry. Mahdist uprisings occurred in February 1900, in 1902–1903, in 1904, and in 1908 but these revolts were of short duration. In 1916, Abd Allah as Suhayni, who claimed to be the Prophet Isa, launched an unsuccessful jihad.

=== Undefined borders ===
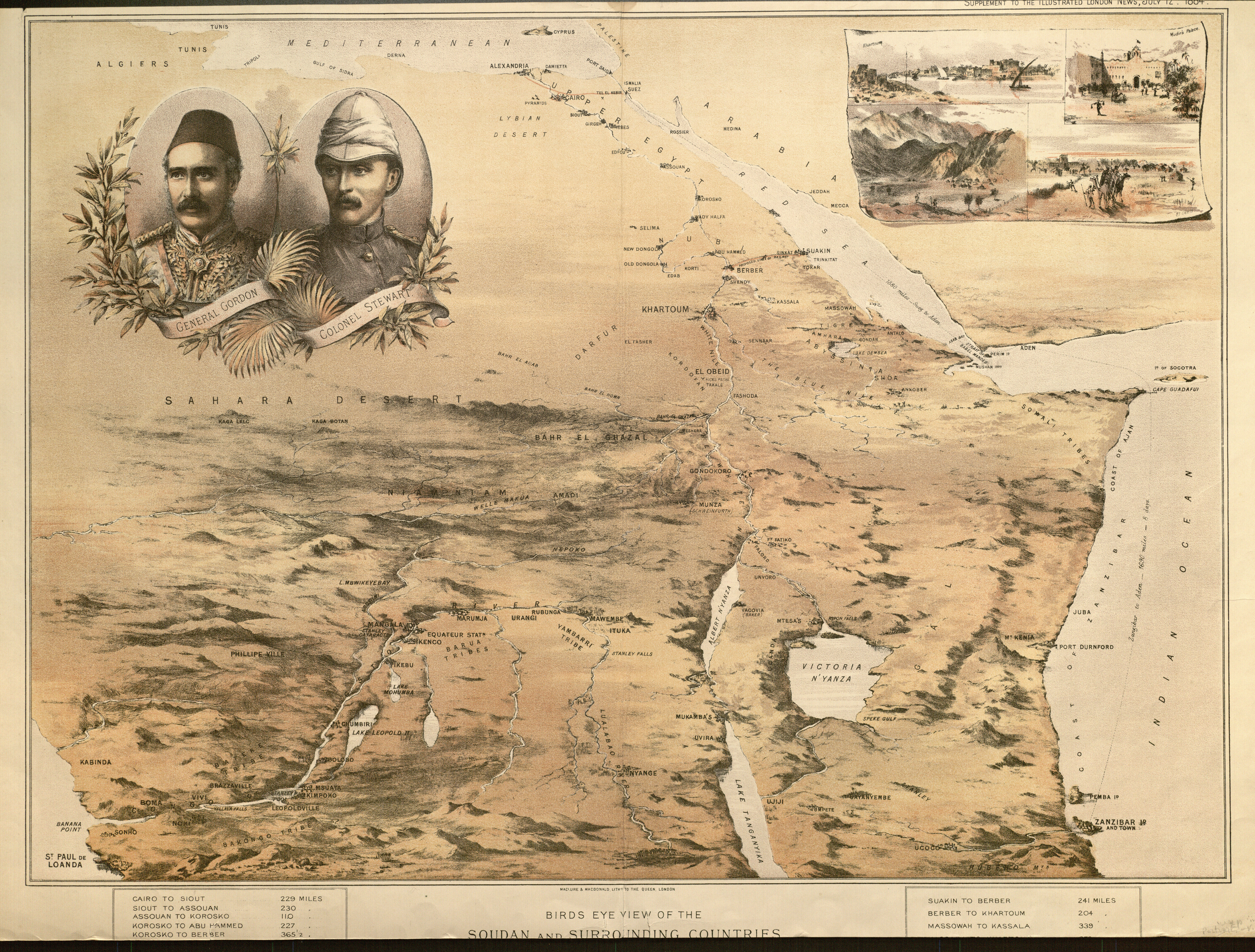
Bird's Eye View of the Soudan and Surrounding Countries, 1884

The problem of the condominium's undefined borders was a greater concern. A 1902 treaty with Ethiopia fixed the southeastern boundary of Sudan. Seven years later, an Anglo-Belgian treaty determined the status of the Lado Enclave in the south, establishing a border with the Belgian Congo (present-day Democratic Republic of the Congo).

The western boundary proved more difficult to resolve. Darfur was the only province formerly under Egyptian control that was not recaptured during the Anglo-Egyptian conquest of Sudan. When the Mahdiyah disintegrated, Sultan Ali Dinar reclaimed Darfur's throne, which had been lost to the Egyptians in 1874 and held the throne under Ottoman suzerainty, with British approval on condition that he pay annual tribute to the khedive. When World War I broke out, Ali Dinar proclaimed his loyalty to the Ottoman Empire and responded to the Porte's call for a jihad against the Allies. Britain, which had declared a protectorate over Egypt in 1914, sent a small force against Ali Dinar, who died in subsequent fighting. In 1916, the British annexed Darfur to Sudan and terminated the Sultanate of Darfur.

=== Economic development ===
During the co-dominium period, economic development occurred only in the Nile Valley's settled areas. In the first two decades of condominium rule, the British extended telegraph and rail lines to link key points in northern Sudan but services did not reach more remote areas. Port Sudan opened in 1906, replacing Sawakin as the country's principal outlet to the sea.

In 1911 the Sudanese government and the private Sudan Plantations Syndicate launched the Gezira Scheme (Gezira is also seen as Jazirah) to provide a source of high-quality cotton for Britain's textile industry. An irrigation dam near Sennar, completed in 1925, brought a much larger area in Al Jazirah under cultivation. Planters sent cotton by rail from Sannar to Port Sudan for shipment abroad. The Gezira Scheme made cotton the mainstay of the country's economy and turned the region into Sudan's most densely populated area.

== Egyptian independence, fate of Sudan ==
In 1922, Britain renounced the protectorate and approved Egypt's declaration of independence. However, the 1923 Egyptian constitution made no claim to Egyptian sovereignty over Sudan. Subsequent negotiations in London between the British and the new Egyptian government foundered on the Sudan question.

Inflamed by the failure of the talks, nationalists rioted in Egypt and in Sudan where a minority supported union with Egypt. In November 1924, Sir Lee Stack, governor-general of Sudan and Sirdar, was assassinated in Cairo. Britain ordered all Egyptian troops, civil servants, and public employees withdrawn from Sudan. In 1925, Khartoum formed the 4,500-man Sudan Defence Force (SDF) under Sudanese officers to replace Egyptian units.

=== Indirect rule ===
Sudan was relatively quiet in the late 1920s and 1930s. During this period, the colonial government favored indirect rule, which allowed Britain to govern through indigenous leaders.

In Sudan, the traditional leaders were the shaykhs (of villages, tribes, and districts) in the north and tribal chiefs in the south. The British first delegated judicial powers to shaykhs to enable them to settle local disputes; then, gradually, they allowed the shaykhs to administer local government under the supervision of British district commissioners. The number of Sudanese recognizing these leaders and the degree of authority they wielded varied considerably.

The mainstream of political development, represented by other local leaders and Khartoum's educated elite, disapproved of indirect rule. In their view, it prevented the country's unification, exacerbated tribalism in the north, and in the south served to buttress a less-advanced society against Arab influence. Indirect rule also implied government decentralization, which alarmed the educated elite who had careers in the central administration and envisioned an eventual transfer of power from British colonial authorities to their class.

Nationalists and the Khatmiyyah opposed indirect rule, but the Ansar (the followers of the Mahdi) supported the British approach since many of them enjoyed positions of local authority.

== Britain's policy towards the South ==
From the beginning of the Anglo-Egyptian condominium, the British sought to modernize Sudan by applying European technology to its underdeveloped economy and by replacing its authoritarian institutions with ones that adhered to liberal English traditions.

Southern Sudan's remote and undeveloped provinces—Equatoria, Bahr al Ghazal, and Upper Nile—received little official attention until after World War I, except for efforts to suppress tribal warfare and the slave trade. The British justified this policy by claiming that the south was not ready for exposure to the modern world. To allow the south to develop along indigenous lines, the British, therefore, closed the region to outsiders. As a result, the south remained isolated. A few Arab merchants controlled the region's limited commercial activities while Arab bureaucrats administered whatever laws existed. Christian missionaries, who operated schools and medical clinics, provided limited social services in southern Sudan.

The earliest Christian missionaries were the Verona Fathers, a Roman Catholic religious order that had established southern missions before the Mahdiyah. Other missionary groups active in the south included Presbyterians from the United States and the Anglican Church Missionary Society. There was no competition among these missions, largely because they maintained separate areas of influence. The government eventually subsidized the mission schools that educated southerners. Because mission graduates usually succeeded in gaining posts in the provincial civil service, many northerners regarded them as tools of British imperialism. The few southerners who received higher training attended schools in British East Africa (present-day Kenya, Uganda, and Tanzania) rather than in Khartoum, thereby exacerbating the north–south division.

=== "Closed-door" ordinances ===
British authorities treated the three southern provinces as a separate region. The colonial administration, as it consolidated its southern position in the 1920s, detached the south from the rest of Sudan for all practical purposes.

The period's "closed door" ordinances, which barred northern Sudanese from entering or working in the south, reinforced this separate development policy. Moreover, the British gradually replaced Arab administrators and expelled Arab merchants, thereby severing the south's last economic contacts with the north. The colonial administration also discouraged the spread of Islam, the practice of Arab customs, and the wearing of Arab dress. At the same time, the British made efforts to revitalize African customs and tribal life that the slave trade had disrupted. Finally, a 1930 directive stated that blacks in the southern provinces were to be considered a people distinct from northern Muslims and that the region should be prepared for eventual integration with British East Africa.

Although potentially a rich agricultural zone, the south's economic development suffered because of the region's isolation. Moreover, a continual struggle went on between British officials in the north and south, as those in the former resisted recommendations that northern resources be diverted to spur southern economic development. Personality clashes between officials in the two branches in the Sudan Political Service also impeded the south's growth.

Those individuals who served in the southern provinces tended to be military officers with previous Africa experience on loan to the colonial service. They were usually distrustful of Arab influence and were committed to keeping the south under British control. By contrast, officials in the northern provinces tended to be Arabists often drawn from the diplomatic and consular service. Whereas northern provincial governors conferred regularly as a group with the governor-general in Khartoum, their three southern colleagues met to coordinate activities with the governors of the British East African colonies.

== Rise of Sudanese nationalism ==
Sudanese nationalism, as it developed after World War I, was an Arab and Muslim phenomenon with its support base in the northern provinces. Nationalists opposed indirect rule and advocated a centralized national government in Khartoum responsible for both regions. Nationalists also perceived Britain's southern policy as artificially dividing Sudan and preventing its unification under an arabized and Islamic ruling class.

Ironically, a non-Arab led Sudan's first modern nationalist movement. In 1921, Ali Abd al Latif, a Muslim Dinka and former army officer, founded the United Tribes Society that called for an independent Sudan in which power would be shared by tribal and religious leaders. Three years later, Ali Abd al Latif's movement, reconstituted as the White Flag League, organized demonstrations in Khartoum that took advantage of the unrest that followed Stack's assassination. Ali Abd al Latif's arrest and subsequent exile in Egypt sparked a mutiny by a Sudanese army battalion, the suppression of which succeeded in temporarily crippling the nationalist movement.

In the 1930s, nationalism reemerged in Sudan. Educated Sudanese wanted to restrict the governor-general's power and to obtain Sudanese participation in the council's deliberations. However, any change in government required a change in the condominium agreement. Neither Britain nor Egypt would agree to a modification. Moreover, the British regarded their role as the protection of the Sudanese from Egyptian domination. The nationalists feared that the eventual result of friction between the condominium powers might be the attachment of northern Sudan to Egypt and southern Sudan to Uganda and Kenya. Although they settled most of their differences in the Anglo-Egyptian treaty of 1936, which set a timetable for the end of British military occupation, Britain and Egypt failed to agree on Sudan's future status.

Nationalists and religious leaders were divided on the issue of whether Sudan should apply for independence or for union with Egypt. The Mahdi's son, Abd al-Rahman al-Mahdi, emerged as a spokesman for independence in opposition to Ali al Mirghani, the Khatmiyyah leader, who favored union with Egypt. Coalitions supported by each of these leaders formed rival wings of the nationalist movement. Later, radical nationalists and the Khatmiyyah created the Ashigga, later renamed the National Unionist Party (NUP), to advance the cause of Sudanese-Egyptian unification. The moderates favored Sudanese independence in cooperation with Britain and together with the Ansar established the Umma Party.

== The road to independence ==
As World War II approached, the Sudan Defence Force assumed the mission of guarding the Sudanese frontier with Italian East Africa (present-day Ethiopia and Eritrea). During the summer of 1940, in what became the first moves of the East African Campaign, Italian forces invaded Sudan at several points and captured the railway junction at Kassala and other villages along the border. While Port Sudan was raided by irregular Eritrean forces in August 1940, the SDF prevented an Italian advance on the Red Sea port city.

In January 1941, the SDF, expanded to about 20,000 troops, retook Kassala and participated in the Empire offensive that routed the Italians in Eritrea and liberated Ethiopia by the end of the year. Some Sudanese units later contributed to the Eighth Army's successful North African Campaign.

In the immediate postwar years, the condominium government made a number of significant changes. In 1942 the Graduates' General Conference, a quasi-nationalist movement formed by educated Sudanese, presented the government with a memorandum that demanded a pledge of self-determination after the war to be preceded by abolition of the "closed door" ordinances, an end to the separate curriculum in southern schools, and an increase in the number of Sudanese in the civil service. The governor-general refused to accept the memorandum but agreed to a government-supervised transformation of indirect rule into a modernized system of local government. Sir Douglas Newbold, governor of Kurdufan Province in the 1930s and later the executive council's civil secretary, advised the establishment of parliamentary government and the administrative unification of north and south. In 1948, over Egyptian objections, Britain authorized the partially elected consultative Legislative Assembly representing both regions to supersede the advisory executive council. The Legislative Assembly had its own executive council consisting of five British and seven Sudanese members. A number of elected local government bodies gradually took over the responsibilities of the former British local commissioner, starting with El Obeid, the centre of the Gum arabic industry. By 1952 it was reported that Sudan had 56 local self-governing authorities.

The pro-Egyptian NUP boycotted the 1948 Legislative Assembly elections. As a result, pro-independence groups dominated the Legislative Assembly. In 1952, leaders of the Umma-dominated legislature negotiated the Self-Determination Agreement with Britain. The legislators then enacted a constitution that provided for a prime minister and council of ministers responsible to a bicameral parliament. The new Sudanese government would have responsibility in all areas except military and foreign affairs, which remained in the British governor-general's hands. Cairo, which demanded recognition of Egyptian sovereignty over Sudan, repudiated the condominium agreement in protest and declared its reigning monarch, Faruk, King of Egypt and the Sudan.

After seizing power in Egypt and overthrowing the Faruk monarchy in late 1952, Colonel Muhammad Naguib broke the deadlock on the problem of Egyptian sovereignty over Sudan. Cairo previously had linked discussions on Sudan's status to an agreement on the evacuation of British troops from the Suez Canal. Naguib separated the two issues and accepted the right of Sudanese self-determination. On February 12, 1953, London and Cairo signed an Anglo-Egyptian accord, which allowed for a three-year transition period from condominium rule to self-government. During the transition phase, British troops would withdraw from Sudan. At the end of this period, the Sudanese would decide their future status in a plebiscite conducted under international supervision. Naguib's concession seemed justified when parliamentary elections held at the end of 1952 gave a majority to the pro-Egyptian NUP, which had called for an eventual union with Egypt. In January 1954, a new government emerged under NUP leader Ismail al-Azhari.

== The south and the unity of Sudan ==
During World War II, some British colonial officers questioned the economic and political viability of the southern provinces as separate from northern Sudan. Britain also had become more sensitive to Arab criticism of the southern policy. In 1946, the Sudan Administrative Conference determined that Sudan should be administered as one country. Moreover, the conference delegates agreed to readmit northern administrators to southern posts, abolish the trade restrictions imposed under the "closed door" ordinances, and allow southerners to seek employment in the north. Khartoum also nullified the prohibition against Muslim proselytizing in the south and introduced Arabic in the south as the official administration language.

Some southern British colonial officials responded to the Sudan Administrative Conference by charging that northern agitation had influenced the conferees and that no voice had been heard at the conference in support of retaining the separate development policy. These British officers argued that northern domination of the south would result in a southern rebellion against the government. Khartoum therefore convened a conference at Juba to quell the fears of southern leaders and British officials in the south and to assure them that a post-independence government would safeguard southern political and cultural rights.

Despite these promises, an increasing number of southerners expressed concern that northerners would overwhelm them. In particular, they resented the imposition of Arabic as the official language of administration, which deprived most of the few educated English-speaking southerners of the opportunity to enter public service. They also felt threatened by the replacement of trusted British district commissioners with unsympathetic northerners. After the government replaced several hundred colonial officials with Sudanese, only four of whom were southerners, the southern elite abandoned hope of a peaceful, unified, independent Sudan.

The hostility of southerners toward the northern Arab majority surfaced violently when southern army units mutinied in August 1955 to protest their transfer to garrisons under northern officers. The rebellious troops killed several hundred northerners, including government officials, army officers, and merchants. The government quickly suppressed the revolt and eventually executed seventy southerners for sedition. But this harsh reaction failed to pacify the south, as some of the mutineers escaped to remote areas and organized resistance to the Arab-dominated government of Sudan.

== See also ==
- History of Sudan
- Sudan–United Kingdom relations

== Sources ==
- – Sudan
