= Sa'd al-Dawla al-Qawwasi =

Fakhr al-Mulk Saꜥd al-Dawla Abū Manṣūr Sārtakīn al-Qawwāsī (fl. 1080–1101) was a governor and military commander of the Fatimid Caliphate. He was killed in action during the war with the Franks.

== Governor in Upper Egypt ==
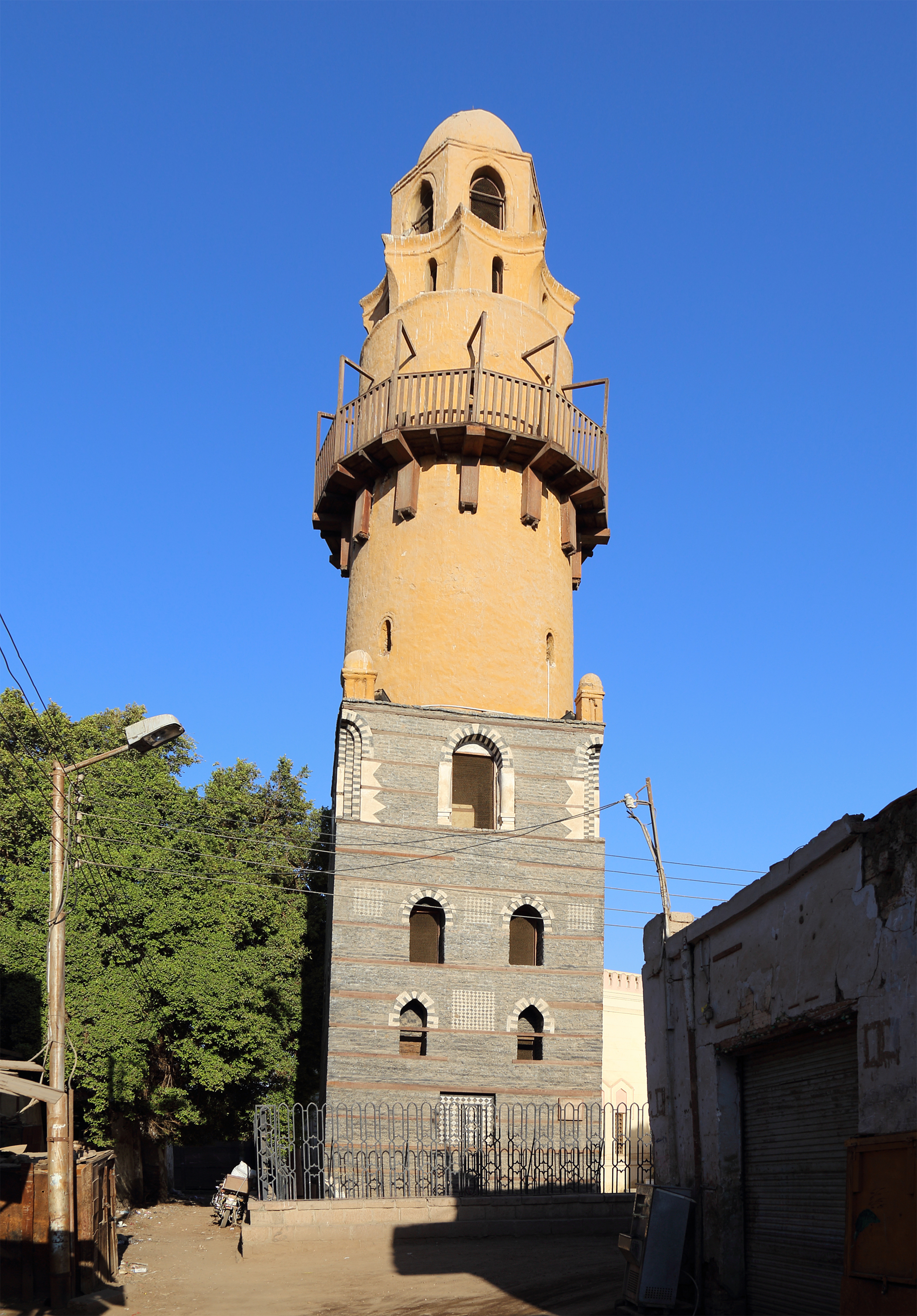
Minaret of Esna, built by al-Qawwāsī

According to Ibn al-Athīr, he was a mamlūk (slave soldier) of Badr al-Jamālī. The name al-Qawwāsī means "the archer". The contemporary historian Ibn al-Qalānisī calls him an emir. In 1080, he was the governor of Qūṣ when the recently abdicated King Solomon of Makuria came to Aswan intending to visit the church of Saint Onuphrius at al-Wadi. Al-Qawwāsī had him arrested and brought to Cairo, where he was received hospitably by Badr. This story is recounted by al-Maqrīzī and by the contemporary History of the Patriarchs of Alexandria, although only the latter names the governor. Solomon died and was buried in Cairo in 1081.

That year (1081), al-Qawwāsī constructed a minaret in Esna. It is the only part of the mosque renovated by Badr in 1077 that still stands. In the dedicatory inscription, he calls himself al-Juyūshī to highlight his patron–client relationship with Badr, the amīr al-juyūsh (commander-in-chief). The inscription includes the first use of the term miʾdhana (place of the adhān prayer) in Egyptian epigraphy.

== War with the Franks ==
There is confusion regarding al-Qawwāsī's role as the Egyptian commander at the first battle of Ramla in 1101. The Arabic sources do not agree on his nisba (surname), his fate or the result of the battle. In the account of Ibn Muyassar, al-Qawwāsī held the Egyptian centre and was killed in action. The Egyptians subsequently routed the Franks. According to al-Maqrīzī, his name was in fact al-Ṭawāshī and he survived the battle. Ibn al-Qalānisī, who calls him al-Qawāmisī or al-ʿAawwāsī, places him at Ascalon between June–July and September–October 1101, waiting for the Frankish advance. He claims that he died a martyr when his horse stumbled and threw him during the subsequent battle. The name al-Qawāmisī, meaning "the disastrous", is probably a piece of "gallows humour" and not an actual name. Ibn al-Athīr, who calls the commander al-Ṭawāshī, makes the battle an Egyptian defeat, attributing it to al-Ṭawāshī's fall from his horse, after which the Franks captured his tent. He adds the detail that al-Ṭawāshī was warned by astrologers not to ride a horse until he arrived in Beirut, to which he had been appointed governor. The name al-Ṭawāshī could mean "the eunuch" or the "first class cavalryman". As a military term, ṭawāshī belongs to a later period and its use by the chroniclers is probably an error for al-Qawwāsī.

The account of Ibn Muyassar is not consistent, since it claims that al-Qawwāsī attacked the Franks in May 1102 and then took part in the capture of Ramla in June 1103, although he had supposedly died in 1101. Ibn al-Athīr likewise places al-Qawwāsī's defeat in 1103.

== Sources ==
- Beshir, Beshir Ibrahim (1975). "New Light on Nubian Fāṭimid Relations". Arabic. 22 (1): 15–24. JSTOR 4056449.
- Bloom, Jonathan M. (1984). "Five Fatimid Minarets in Upper Egypt". Journal of the Society of Architectural Historians. 43 (2): 162–167. JSTOR 989903.
- Brett, Michael (1995). "The Battles of Ramla (1099–1105)". In U. Vermeulen; D. De Smet (eds.). Egypt and Syria in the Fatimid, Ayyubid and Mamluk Eras. Peeters. pp. 17–37.
- Garcin, Jean-Claude (1976). Un Centre musulman de la Haute-Égypte médiévale, Qūṣ. Institut Français d'Archéologie Orientale.
- Lev, Ya'acov (1999). Saladin in Egypt. Brill.
- Schmidt, Stefanie (2023). "Badr al-Jamālī and the Mosques of Aswan: New Considerations Based on a Building Inscription from the Museum für Islamische Kunst in Berlin". Mitteilungen des Deutschen Archäologischen Instituts Kairo. 79: 1–18. doi:10.34780/fb6q-hqv5.
- Tibble, Steve (2018). The Crusader Armies, 1099–1187. Yale University Press.
- Wiet, Gaston, ed. (1930). Matériaux pour un Corpus Inscriptionum Arabicarum: Première partie. Vol. 2: Égypte. Institut Français d'Archéologie Orientale.
