= Graduates' General Congress =

Sudanese independence movement (1938–1943)

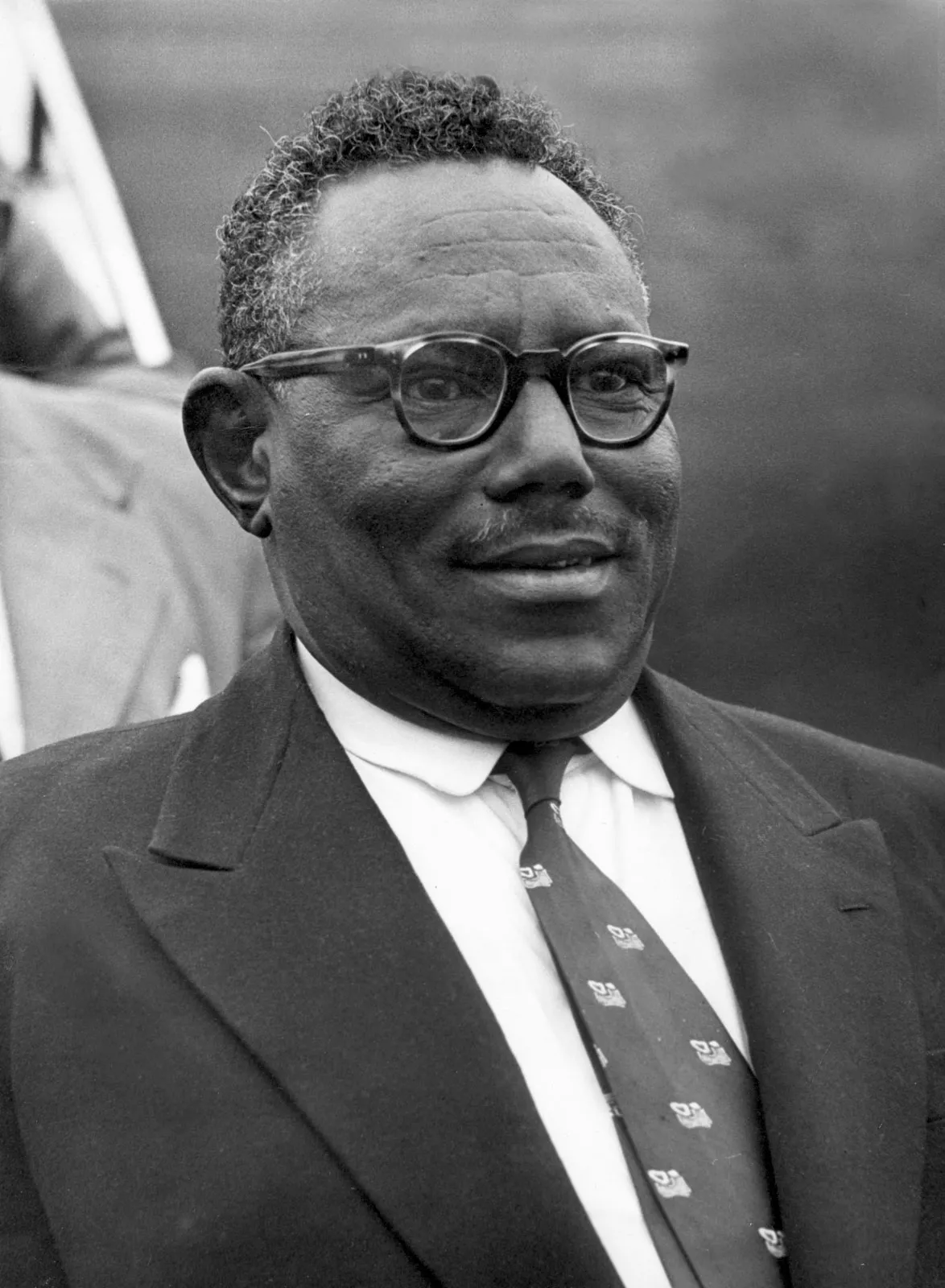
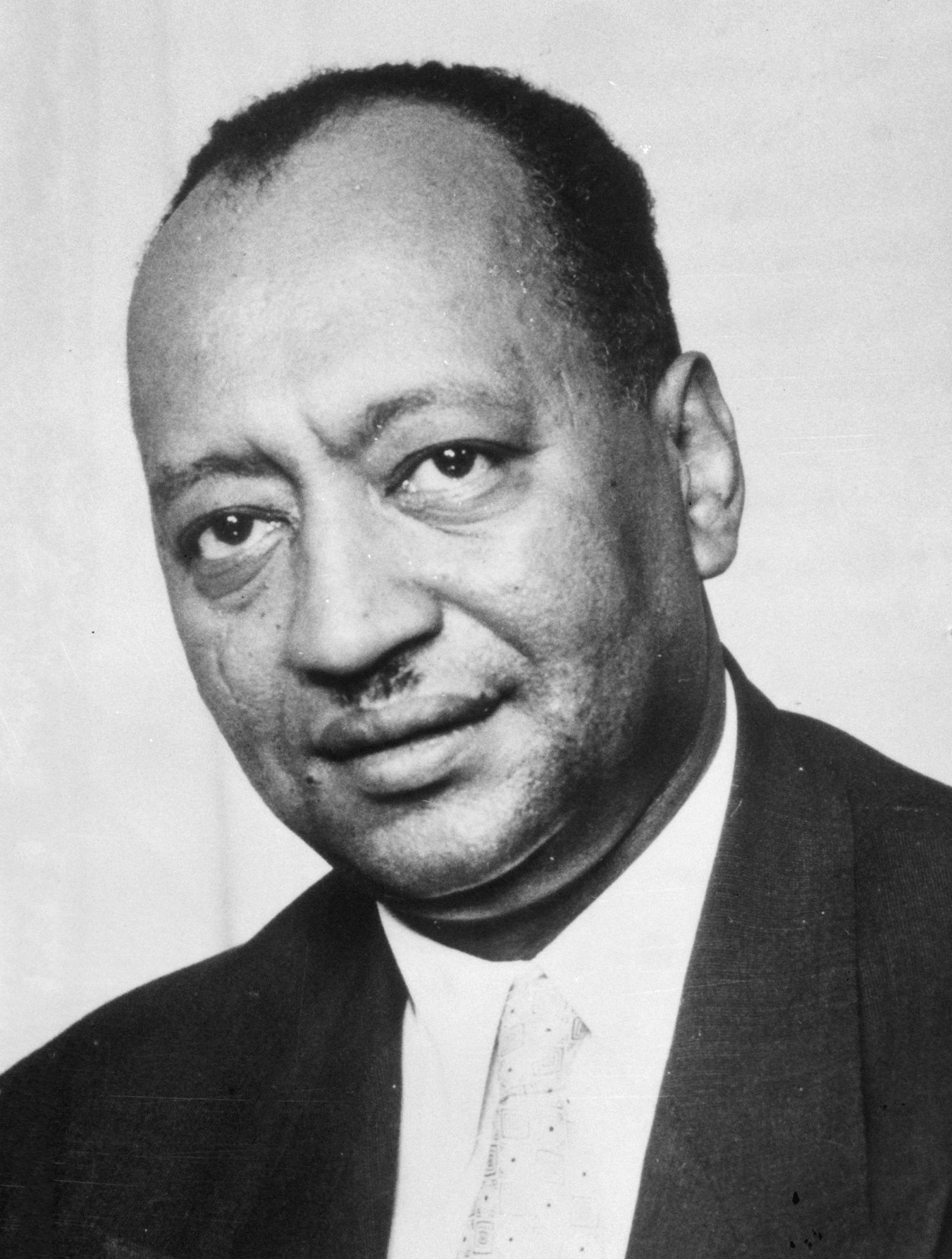
Ismail al-Azhari (left) and Muhammad Ahmad Mahgoub, notable members of GGC

The Graduates' General Congress (GGC) (Arabic: مؤتمر الخريجين; 12 March 1938 – 1943), known also as the Graduates' General Conference, is a Sudanese entity established during the period of colonial bilateral rule in Sudan, and played an important role in the struggle for independence. The birth of the GGC was by graduates of Gordon Memorial College (today’s University of Khartoum), and graduates of other foreign colleges, including lawyers, teachers, and civil servants, who sought greater political representation and self-determination for Sudan. The first secretary of the GGC was Ismail al-Azhari, which was elected in 1940 before the GGC split in 1943.

The GGC's efforts played a key role in shaping the political landscape of modern Sudan, and many of the organisation's leaders went on to play prominent roles in the independent Sudanese government. However, some scholars have also criticised the GGC and other nationalist groups in Sudan for focusing too heavily on elite interests and failing to address the needs of Sudan's marginalised communities

== Background ==
Following the fall of the Mahdist state in 1899, Sudan came under the joint Anglo-Egyptian administration known as the Condominium. Established by an agreement signed on 19 January 1899, by British Consul General Lord Cromer and Egyptian Foreign Minister Boutros Ghali, the administration appointed Lord Kitchener as Sudan's Governor-General. High-ranking posts were occupied by British officers, while Egyptians filled lower administrative roles. The administration prioritized security and organization, relying on limited resources funded by Egyptian revenues.

=== Graduates' Club ===
Despite limited funds, condominium administrators established schools and Gordon Memorial College to train Sudanese for clerical and minor administrative roles. The college provided education in Arabic and English, with cultural activities fostering language skills, group spirit, and exposure to Arab and European political ideas. This environment inspired students to form a Graduates' Club in 1917, promoting unity and nationalist thought.

The Sudan Schools' Graduates' Club, opened on 18 May 1918, in Omdurman under the supervision of the Gordon Memorial College, initially focused on social and cultural activities, such as celebrating religious events. However, politically inclined members sought to expand its role into a platform for nationalist discourse and resistance against the Anglo-Egyptian colonial rule. Discussions at the club often centred on Sudan's political future, fostering debates that eventually led to the formation of two ideological factions with distinct visions for Sudan's path to independence.

The first faction promoted the idea of "Sudan for the Sudanese," inspired by journalist Hussein Sharif. Sharif, through his writings in the newspaper Hadarat Al-Sudan, advocated limited cooperation with the British to modernise Sudan but opposed unity with Egypt, fearing it would undermine Sudanese autonomy. This group, closely allied with Sayyid Abdul Rahman al-Mahdi of the Ansar sect, dominated the club's leadership from 1920 to 1933.

The second faction promoted the idea of "Unity of the Nile Valley" which was supported unity with Egypt under the Egyptian crown, emphasising cultural and geographical ties between the two nations. Led by Ahmed al-Feel, they rejected alliances with religious sects, despite many members being from families traditionally loyal to the Khatmiyyah sect.

These factions also formed along the sectarian division between the Ansar and Khatmiyyah.

The club's exposure to global events, particularly the 1919 Egyptian revolution and the 1922 Unilateral Declaration of Egyptian Independence, influenced its members significantly, fostering anti-colonial sentiments. This atmosphere led to the formation of Sudan's first secret political party, the League of Sudanese Union, in 1922. The League advocated Sudanese-Egyptian unity while criticising religious leaders for their perceived cooperation with colonial authorities. In the same year, Lieutenant Ali Abd Al-Latif's 1922 article called for political and economic reforms, which further incited nationalist sentiment, leading to his imprisonment. Upon his release, he and other nationalists intensified efforts to mobilise against colonial rule, culminating in a revolutionary agenda that symbolised the growing momentum of Sudan's independence movement.

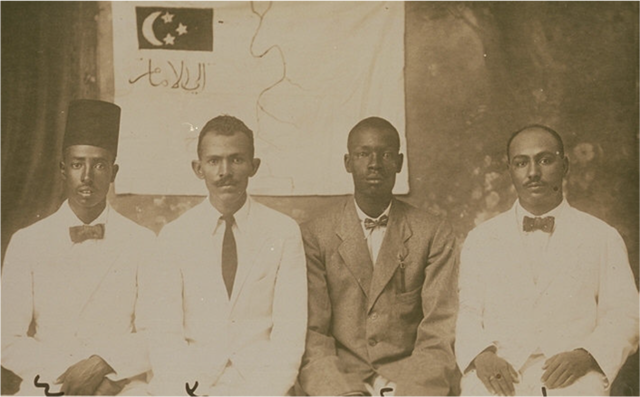
Members of the White Flag League. From the right: Hussein Sharif, Ali Abd al Latif, Salih Abdelgadir and Obaid Haj al-Amin

Internal divisions arose in the League of Sudanese Union, and in 1923, some members, including Obaid Haj al-Amin, left the League, believing verbal dissent was insufficient. They joined the newly created White Flag League, led by figures such as Ali Abd Al-Latif, Lieutenant Abdullah Khalil, and First Lieutenant Abdel Fadil Elmaz, which took a more radical stance against British rule, while advocated for "Unity of the Nile Valley," calling for Sudanese independence and unity with Egypt and pledging allegiance to King Fuad.

=== 1924 Revolution ===
The 1924 White Flag League movement was the first organized Sudanese resistance against British rule, led by military officers and graduates. Protests began in Khartoum, spreading to other cities, calling for British withdrawal and solidarity with Egypt. The imprisonment of leader Ali Abd Al-Latif escalated the unrest, leading to military confrontations. By November, the revolt was suppressed, with revolutionaries killed or imprisoned.

The British blamed Egyptian officials and non-Arab Sudanese for the unrest, expelling Egyptians and punishing revolutionaries. To prevent future uprisings, they implemented indirect rule, empowering tribal leaders while excluding educated elites from administration. Investment in education declined, effectively sidelining nationalist movements and strengthening colonial control.

=== Post-revolution ===
After the 1924 revolution and its suppression, Sudanese educated elites shifted their focus to cultural and intellectual activities, forming literary societies and study groups to expand their knowledge and foster a collective identity. Meeting in private homes to evade British surveillance, these groups engaged in debates, poetry, acting, and discussions on political and social issues, with members publishing patriotic articles in British and Egyptian press outlets.

The Abu Roaf Society, established in Omdurman around 1928-1929 by Hassan and Hussein Al-Kidd and other Gordon College graduates, emphasised reading and intellectual growth. Influenced by Egyptian nationalism and the Wafd Party, its members advocated Sudan's Arab-Islamic identity and union with Egypt. They explored political ideologies, including leftist and Fabian literature, which shaped their nationalist ideals.

The Al-Fajr Society, founded in the Al-Hashmab district of Omdurman, focused on education and Sudanese self-governance. Members like Muhammad Ahmad Mahgoub and Arafat Mohammed Abd Allah launched Al-Fajr magazine to discuss literary and political issues, rejecting both tribalism and pro-Egyptian policies. Their vision for Sudan was complete independence from both Britain and Egypt, influenced by Western philosophical ideas.

The Ashiqqa Society, formed in 1931, initially supported the separatist and the Ansar, but later aligned with pro-Egyptian unionist ideologies. Led by figures like Ismail al-Azhari, they also played a significant role in the Graduates' Club committees, blending cultural and political aspirations.

In Wad Madani, graduates from the Abu Roaf Society formed another literary group in 1936 named the Wad Madani Literary Society. This society promoted reading, theatre, and awareness of nationalist movements in Africa and Asia, drawing inspiration from the Indian Congress.

Between 1925 and 1936, these societies significantly shaped Sudanese intellectual and political thought, fostering nationalist sentiments and laying the groundwork for future political movements, including the Graduates' General Congress.

== GGC history ==
When the students of Gordon Memorial College went on strike in 1931 because of the government's decision to reduce the salaries of graduates during the Great Depression. It was a strike that shook the joints of the government and made it tries to co-opt both parties, graduates and students at the work level to revive the activity of graduates.

The idea of the GGC began as a result of the activity of Sudanese intellectuals in the cultural and social fields. The call for the gathering of graduates began in an article by Khader Hamad in the newspaper Al-Sudan in 1935. After the 1936 Anglo-Egyptian Treaty, which granted Sudanese limited administrative participation while maintaining British control, the Wad Madani Literary Society played an important role in calling for an inclusive alumni conference, especially as when Ahmed Khair, in a lecture in Wad Madani in 1937, called for intellectual union. Al-Fajr magazine published the lecture and presented the idea to the committee of the Graduates' Club in Omdurman headed by Ismail Al-Azhari, who was not excited about the idea at first, and then conferences and seminars were held everywhere Omdurman (Abu Roaf and Hashimab), Wad Madani, and Port Sudan.

=== Creation ===
On 12 February 1938, the Graduates’ General Congress was formally established in a meeting attended by 1180 graduates, in which the constitution was approved, and a fifteen-member committee was elected with a secretary and a president whose appointment changes each month to one of the members of the executive committee.

The GGC sought to advocate for the welfare of Sudanese graduates and the broader population, but the government refused to recognise it as a political representative body. The GGC worked to mobilise public support for Sudanese independence through a variety of means, including organising rallies, publishing newspapers and other media, and forming alliances with other nationalist groups in Sudan and other African countries. It also organised strikes and protests to pressure the British government to grant greater autonomy to Sudan.

On 3 April 1942, amid global shifts like the publication of the Atlantic Charter, the Congress presented twelve demands to the government, including a call for Sudan's right to self-determination after the World War II and end to the "Closed-door" ordinances for southern Sudan. These demands, however, were firmly rejected, with officials accusing the Congress of overstepping its remit and asserting that governance remained solely the responsibility of the Sudan Government.

This rejection led to divisions within the Congress. Moderates like Sayyid Ibrahim Ahmad, willing to cooperate with the government, clashed with more assertive figures such as Ismail al-Azhari, who sought to politicise the Congress. Al-Azhari's faction eventually gained control when he was elected as the first secretary of the GGC in 1940, transforming the Congress into a platform for broader nationalist ambitions.

=== Divisions and dissolution ===
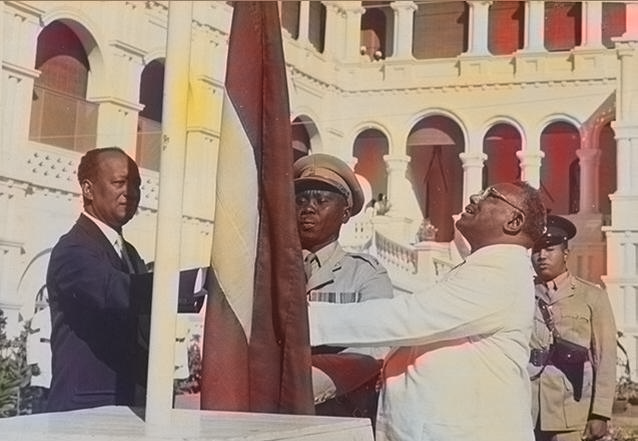
Sudan's flag raised at independence ceremony by the prime minister Ismail al-Azhari and opposition leader Muhammad Ahmad Mahgoub on 1 January 1956, photo by Gadalla Gubara

Al-Azhari's influence culminated in the formation of the Ashiqqa (Brothers') party in 1943, advocating unity with Egypt. His main support came from the Khatmiyya Sufi order, one of the two main Muslim groups in the country. When the more moderate nationalists formed the Umma Party in 1945, its principal support came from the chief rival of the Khatmiyya, the anti-Egyptian Mahdist sect.

Conversely, the moderate faction aligned with the Ummah Party under Sayyid Abdul Rahman al-Mahdi, which championed Sudanese independence. This division among nationalist factions, compounded by historical and ideological tensions, hindered a unified front. Efforts in 1946 to negotiate a common stance on Sudan’s future further exposed these rifts, solidifying separate paths for unity with Egypt and full independence. This fragmentation shaped the trajectory of Sudanese political developments for years to come.

The GGC was led by a number of prominent Sudanese nationalist figures, including Ismail al-Azhari, who would later serve as Sudan's first prime minister after independence, and Muhammad Ahmad Mahgoub, who served as foreign minister, and many who went on to become key figures in the independent Sudanese government after the country gained independence in 1956.
