= Postage stamps and postal history of South Sudan =

The first South Sudanese stamps on a cover from Juba to Canada cancelled 26 August 2011

The Republic of South Sudan became independent on 9 July 2011 from Sudan and issued its first stamps on 13 July 2011. Only almost three months later, on 4 October 2011, did South Sudan become a member of the Universal Postal Union (UPU). Before independence, South Sudan used stamps issued by Sudan. The Directorate of Postal Services of the Ministry of Telecommunication and Postal Services is responsible for postal affairs in South Sudan.

== Postage stamps since independence ==
=== First stamps ===
The coat of arms of South Sudan

The first postage stamps for South Sudan were issued on 13 July 2011 by the Ministry of Telecommunications and Postal Services and should have featured the flag of South Sudan on the one South Sudanese Pound (SSP) stamp, the coat of arms of South Sudan on the 2.5 SSP stamp, and an image of John Garang, the pre-independence leader, on the 3.5 SSP stamp. The wrong coat of arms for South Sudan appeared on the 2.5 SSP stamp, with the eagle looking to the right instead of the left, while it carries two spears instead of one spear and one spade; therefore, it was decided not to issue this stamp, but only the ones of 1 SSP and 3.5 SSP.

This first set of stamps was a gift from the People's Republic of China, and was designed and printed in China by Beijing Security Printers. The official hand-over to the Ministry by the Chinese Chargé d'Affaires in South Sudan took place on 11 July 2011. A set of three envelopes carrying a Chinese stamp and either the 1 SSP, 2.5 SSP or 3.5 SSP stamp were also officially handed over by the Chinese delegation. This special cover is in commemoration of the establishment of the diplomatic relations between the People's Republic of China and the Republic of South Sudan on 9 July 2011. Both special cancellation seals, and the one for South Sudan and the one of China, are dated Saturday 9 July 2011, reflecting the originally foreseen day of issue on the day of the declaration of Independence of South Sudan.

The few 2.5 SSP stamps on the philatelic market are from the few full sets of the commemorative covers, while some singles are also available, which were reportedly sent out by Beijing Security Printers to some of their clients as samples. The set is currently in high demand, with a complete set of three reaching hundreds of US dollars on internet auction sites.

=== Later stamps ===
The release of a second permanent set of stamps was planned for 9 July 2012, the first anniversary of independence. Due to financial austerity measures and for other reasons, the set was released late. The set consists of 6 stamps with values of 1, 2, 5, 10, 20 and 50 SSP, showing birds, wildlife and the national coat of arms. Only the four lowest values were released initially to the public.

All stamps include reference to the "First Anniversary of Independence 9 July 2012". Details on the animals depicted on the different stamps are as follows:

- 1 SSP: Shoe-billed Stork (Balaeniceps rex);
- 2 SSP: Bearded Vulture or ‘Lammergeier’ (Gypaetus barbatus); note, however, the typo on the stamp which reads 'Lammengeier' with an 'n' instead of an 'r';
- 5 SSP: Saddled Bill or Saddle-billed Stork (Ephippiorhynchus senegalensis);
- 10 SSP: Nile Lechwe (Kobus megaceros), additional text on stamp: "Only Found in South Sudan";
- 20 SSP: text on stamp states "White-Eared Kob Found in South Sudan in Greatest Migrating Numbers", but the picture shows actually an Eland Antelope (Taurotragus oryx), in particular note the distinctive hump on the shoulders and hanging skin between the legs;
- 50 SSP: Coat of arms including a stylized picture of the African Fish Eagle (Haliaeetus vocifer).

In a number of the 10 SSP sheetlets (Nile Lechwe) a printing flaw occurs in the third stamp on the second row, with a clear yellowish spot in the red background color above the white value identification.

An unissued second set of two postage stamps was planned to commemorate the occasion of the official state visit of President Salva Kiir to the People's Republic of China, 23 – 25 April 2012. The set, a gift of China to South Sudan like the first issue, consists of a 1 SSP stamp depicting the flags of both South Sudan and China, and a 3.5 SSP bearing a portrait of President Kiir wearing his trade-mark Stetson. An identical portrait was also used on a commemorative cover issued on this occasion by the China National Philatelic Corporation. The same flags can be found on a special presentation folder commemorating the establishment of diplomatic relations between China and South Sudan in 2011. Due to a border conflict which broke out with Sudan, the state visit was cut short and the official hand-over of the postage stamp set was cancelled. The stamps were purportedly handed over to the President's entourage and later stored at the Office of the President in Juba. They were reportedly never handed over to the Ministry of Information, Communications Technology and Postal Services or the postal authorities and presumably remain stored in the President's office.

On 15 September 2017 South Sudan Post started to sell surcharged overprints on the 1 SSP National Flag and the 3.5 SSP Dr John Garang of the 1st postage stamp issue of 2011 and on the 1, 2 and 5 SSP Birds of the 2nd set of 2012/2013. Because of the rampant inflation of the South Sudanese Pound, new increased postal rates have been proposed and in line with those proposals new, increased face-values. The lower values of the 1st and 2nd issues were withdrawn late 2016 and subsequently overprinted with the new surcharged values based on the needs according to the proposed new postal rates.

On 21 July 2020 South Sudan released a new stamp issue commemorating the health workers assisting in the fight against the Covid-19 pandemic. The new stamp series titled "Struggle against Covid-19 Pandemic: Tribute to healthcare personnel" is a joint issue with a number of other African postal services based on a common design depicting a medical crew surrounding planet Earth as a protective layer. The whole form suggests the coronavirus shape. The South Sudan issue was designed by the South Sudan Stamp Committee under the chairmanship of the South Sudan designer Mr. Stanislaus Tombe Felix, using some design features of that joint theme. The set has six face values: 50, 100, 200, 300, 500 and 1000 SSP and one souvenir sheet with face value 1000 SSP. For both the set as well as the souvenir sheet an official FDC has been made available for the first time.

== Postal covers and other postal items ==
In the first months after Independence of South Sudan on 9 July 2011 and the start of selling of their own first stamps of the Republic of South Sudan to the public a few days later, the South Sudan postal authorities were also still selling their stock of stamps of Sudan, resulting in covers with mixed franking (see illustration).

== Revenue stamps ==
South Sudan is also using postage stamps for other than postage usage. For instance, the application fees for a post office box, 5 SSP, is paid in the form of five 1 SSP stamps, pasted on the application form itself. The central Government of South Sudan, however, has not issued any national revenue stamps. Only Central Equatoria State is known to have issued its own state revenue stamps, which are used on certain documents issued by the state, like Age Assessment Certificates. Central Equatoria State has been using also after independence of South Sudan the old three revenue stamps of 1, 2 and 5 SDG (Sudanese Pound) with text in English and Arabic, used with a 1 to 1 parity to the SSP. All three values have been re-issued in SSP in 2014 or 2015.

== Post offices in independent South Sudan ==
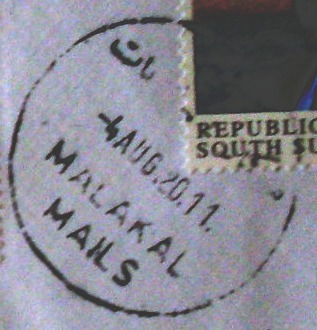
Old style postal cancellation still used in independent South Sudan

At the time of the signing of the Comprehensive Peace Agreement (CPA) between Khartoum and the SPLM/SPLA in Nairobi on 9 January 2005, only the post offices in the four garrison towns of Juba, Wau, Malakal and Renk remained open, but they hardly functioned. Dozens of post offices and agencies were closed during the second civil war in the South between 1983 and 2005. A complete listing of post offices and agencies which existed in Southern Sudan can be found in the booklet Post Offices and Postal Agencies of the Sudan 1867–1998.

The first of the closed post offices to be officially re-opened was in Torit (capital of Eastern Equatoria State) in 2010, followed on 5 July 2011 by the post office of Yambio (Western Equatoria State), on 25 July 2012 by the post office of Yei., on 20 February 2013 the PO of Maridi, a month later on 28 March 2013 the PO in Rumbek, the capital of Lakes State and two days later the PO in Aweil, the capital of Northern Bahr el Ghazal State. It has been reported that the post office of Kaya in Central Equatoria has also re-opened already in October 2010, but became operational only some time later, with only one post officer.

== Collecting South Sudanese stamps ==
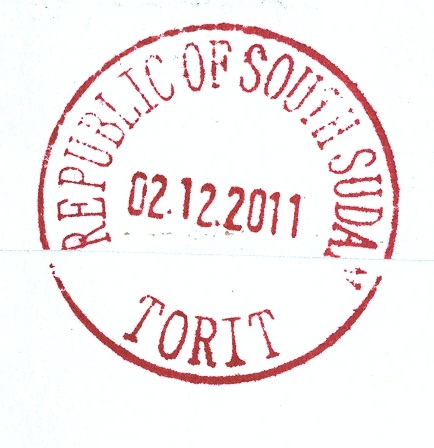
New type of postal cancellation

South Sudan entered the world of stamp-issuing countries in July 2011 with a design error already in its first issue and the subsequent withdrawal of that 2.5 SSP stamp. This was followed by a set of stamps, which was designed and proof printed, but never issued, although a few sets are available at internet auction sites. The second set officially issued also has a design error, the 20 SSP stamp shows a picture of an Eland Antelope, but the text on the stamp refers to the White-Eared Kob.

It is difficult to collect stamps of South Sudan, because the routing of international mail via the postal authorities in Sudan ceased in April 2012 with the discontinuation of the direct flights between Juba and Khartoum, there has been no international mail connection. No independent postal exchange office has yet been established, although the Directorate of Postal Services intended to sign an agreement with Ethiopian Airlines and Kenyan Airlines early 2012 to carry mail abroad in order to be independent of northern Sudan, but this didn't materialize. As a consequence, it is almost impossible to reach them by mail, although some incoming international mail arrives via Ethiopia and lately especially via Kenya, while the postal authorities has no agreement with any international stamp agency for the marketing of its stamps.

The South Sudan Philatelic Society is a philatelic society interested in South Sudan philately, that so far has published two issues of its newsletter and since September 2017 there is a Facebook group "South Sudan Stamp Collectors".

== See also ==
- List of people on stamps of Sudan
- Postage stamps and postal history of Sudan
