= White Flag League =

Nationalist resistance movement in Sudan

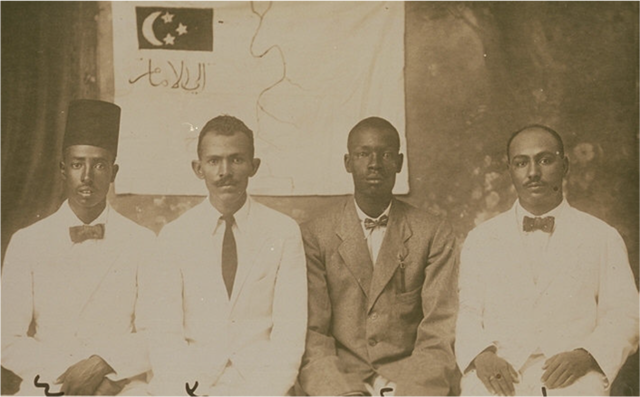
- Leaders of the White Flag League (From the right: Hussein Sherief, Ali Abdullatif, Salih Abdelgadir and Obeid Haj Elamin)
- Leader: Ali Abdullatif
- Key people: Abdullah Khalil; Abdel Fadil Elmaz
- Dates active: 1923–1924
- Ideology: Egyptian-Sudanese Unity

The White Flag League (also known as the White Flag Association, White Flag Society, or the White Brigade Movement) was an organized nationalist resistance movement of Sudanese military officers, formed in 1923, which made a substantial early attempt toward Sudanese independence with the 1924 revolution.

== History ==
Lieutenant Ali Abd Al-Latif's 1922 "Claim of the Sudanese Nation" article in the al-Hadarah called for Sudanese self-determination, more education, an end to the sugar monopoly, and higher posts for Sudanese in the Anglo-Egyptian administration, leading to his imprisonment. Upon his release, he and other nationalists intensified efforts to mobilise against colonial rule, culminating in a revolutionary agenda that symbolised the growing momentum of Sudan's independence movement.

Internal divisions arose in the League of Sudanese Union, and in 1923, some members, including Obaid Haj al-Amin, left the League, believing verbal dissent was insufficient. They joined the newly created White Flag League, led by figures such as Ali Abd Al-Latif, Lieutenant Abdullah Khalil, and First Lieutenant Abdel Fadil Elmaz, which took a more radical stance against British rule, while advocated for "Unity of the Nile Valley," calling for Sudanese independence and unity with Egypt and pledging allegiance to King Fuad.

=== 1924 Revolution ===
The 1924 White Flag League movement, led by Sudanese nationalists, marked the first organised resistance against British colonial rule. Initially involving military officers and graduates from the Omdurman Graduates' Club, the movement began with urban demonstrations in June 1924. Protesters in cities like Khartoum, Omdurman, and Port Sudan called for the downfall of British rule and expressed solidarity with Egypt, raising anti-colonial slogans and the Egyptian flag. These activities led to the imprisonment of the movement's leader, Ali Abd Al-Latif, on 4 July 1924, which only intensified protests under the leadership of Obaid Haj Al-Amin.

As the movement escalated, peaceful protests gave way to military confrontations. On 9 August 1924, military school students joined the revolution, demonstrating in Khartoum and distributing ammunition to civilians. By November, Abdul Fadil Almaz led the group's insurrection at the military training academy in 1924, which ended in their defeat and Almaz's death after the British army blew up the military hospital where he was garrisoned. It has been suggested that this defeat was partially the result of the Egyptian garrison in Khartoum North not supporting the insurrection with artillery as was previously promised.

Modern historians attribute the revolt to economic hardship, generational tensions, and dissatisfaction among educated Sudanese. The 1924 uprising is widely regarded as a significant early expression of Sudanese nationalism and organised resistance against colonial rule.

In response, the British administration harshly suppressed the nationalist movements, targeting both Egyptian officials and non-Arab Sudanese involved. Egyptian civilian and military personnel were expelled, Egyptian newspapers banned, and revolutionary leaders imprisoned or executed. The British also dismantled battalions with Southern Sudanese members and created the Sudan Defence Force in 1925 to prevent future uprisings.

To undermine educated elites, especially from the Graduates' Club, the British adopted indirect rule, empowering tribal leaders through policies like the 1927 Powers of Sheikhs Ordinance. Tribal leaders gained administrative and judicial authority, while the educated elite were excluded from governance, and investment in education sharply declined. By sidelining educated Sudanese, the British aimed to prevent the resurgence of nationalist movements akin to the 1924 revolution.

== See also ==
- History of Anglo-Egyptian Sudan
