= Ali Abd al Latif =

Sudanese nationalist (1896–1948)

Ali Abd al-Latif
- علي عبد اللطيف
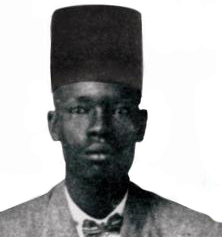

President of the White Flag League
- In office 1923–1924

Personal details
- Born: c.1896 Wadi Halfa, Anglo-Egyptian Sudan
- Died: 1948 (aged ~52) Cairo, Egypt
- Party: White Flag League
- Education: Gordon Memorial College; Khartoum Military School

Military service
- Branch/service: Egyptian Army
- Rank: Lieutenant

Ali Abd al-Latif (Arabic: علي عبد اللطيف; 1896–1948) was a prominent Sudanese nationalist who served as a key member of the White Flag League and played a prominent role in the 1924 Khartoum revolt.

== Early life and family ==
Latif was born in 1896 in the northern Sudanese border town of Wadi Halfa.

His father, Abd al-Latif Ahmad, was a Nuba and a former slave and soldier from the Nuba Mountains. His mother, al-Sabr hailed from the Dinka of Bahr El Ghazal and had formerly been a slave in al-Khandaq before marrying his father. She was thought to have had a huge influence to young Ahmad. Ahmad too had originally been a household slave in al-Khanadaq, then a center of commerce. He was later acquired by Mahdist forces under Wad el Nujumi to serve in the Mahdists 1889 invasion of Egypt. Ahmad either deserted or was taken prisoner by Anglo-Egyptian forces following the Battle of Toski, and ended up enlisted in the Egyptian Army.

== Military service ==
Like many Sudanese of slave origins, Latif joined the military, as it offered one of the few means of social mobility. Whilst his father had served in the Egyptian Army, it was actually largely due to his mother than Latif was able to rise into the emerging middle class, commonly referred to as the effendiyya. When Latif moved from Ed Dueim to Khartoum c.1900, he was able to find support from his maternal uncle, Rihan Abd Allah, who his mother had connected him with. Abd Allah may not have actually been Latif's biological uncle, but instead the term may have just arisen from Abd Allah sharing Latif's mothers Dinka and Bahr el Ghazal roots. Regardless, Abd Allah was an influential Sudanese Dinka officer, and was able to secure Latif a place at a Khalwa, and also later at the Gordon Memorial College, from where Latif went on to graduate from the Khartoum Military School.

Latif graduated from the Khartoum Military School in 1913, and was awarded the Sirdar's Medal for best cadet of the year, and was commissioned as a Mulazim Tani in the Sudanese XI Battalion. During his serving as an officer in the Egyptian Army he went on to fight in the numerous punitive campaigns fought by the Egyptian Army in southern Sudan. After several years in the Egyptian Army, during which he rose to the rank of Lieutenant, Latif was dismissed for political reasons.

== Political career ==
In 1921 Latif founded the United Tribes Society; an organisation that called for an independent Sudan in which power would be shared by tribal and religious leaders. Latif gained prominence in 1922, after he wrote an article for the al-Hadarah newspaper supporting the cause of sedition and Sudanese nationalism. In the article, titled "Claim of the Sudanese Nation," Latif pressed for Sudanese self-determination, more education, an end to the sugar monopoly, and higher posts for Sudanese in the Anglo-Egyptian administration.

Whilst the article was ultimately not published due to objections by the editor, Latif was arrested, tried, and sentenced to a year imprisonment. The trial however gained significant publicity and coverage in the Egyptian press, and Latif would emerge from prison significantly more popular than he had been when he went in.

Latif's background, as both a soldier and a member of Sudan's black African community, meant he was able to reach out, through personal contacts, with a massive swath of the population, particularly the segments needed to for a political struggle. His military background meant he was able to spread his message of anti-colonialism to officers and soldiers, whilst his black African background meant he could politicize the de-tribalised and growing urban black community in the Khartoum-Khartoum North-Omdurman area. This section of the population; the newly urbanised and de-triblaised southern Sudanese black community, had been seen by the British administration as a segment as especially vulnerable to politicization.

Latif's movement, reconstituted as the White Flag League, organized demonstrations in Khartoum that took advantage of the unrest that followed Stack's assassination. Latif's arrest and subsequent exile in Egypt sparked a mutiny by a Sudanese army battalion, the suppression of which succeeded in temporarily crippling the nationalist movement.

== Later life and death ==
For his part in the 1924 Khartoum revolt Latif was sentenced to 7 years imprisonment. Following the completion of his sentence he was not released, but transferred to a mental hospital in Cairo, where he died years later in 1948.
