= El Khandaq =

El Khandaq الخندق
- Location in Sudan
- Coordinates: 18°34′54″N 30°34′10″E
- Country: Sudan
- State: Northern

El Khandaq, also referred to as Al Khandaq, (Arabic: الخندق) is a town in northern Sudan on the River Nile. It is located in the Northern State, or ash-Shamālīyah in Arabic.

== History ==
It is the site of an important fortress with beginnings dating to the Christian period. During the 19th century (Turkiyya) the town expanded much beyond the fortress to become one of the places with something like urban institutions in Northern Sudan, although it is now largely depopulated, because in the mid 20th century as trading declined, many people moved to Khartoum and Omdurman. This diaspora from the Nile to the west had genetic and linguistic effects on the people of this town.

The town of Al-Khandaq, which was once a thriving river port, was the residence of wealthy merchants who built two-storey houses of mud brick, with many rooms, as well as one-storey dwellings. These have been deserted since the early 1970s, when the trade declined. There are two mosques currently in use: al-Hassanab and al-Khatibiya. Public buildings include the police station (established in 1902), the rest house (established in 1905) and vestiges from the indigo industry. The fort, known as Qaila Qaila (which means "Red Fort"), dominates the town, with its south-west tower visible from both north and south, while its western wall overlooks the area with the remains of the south-western and interval towers. It measures 150 meters by 70 meters, and it is in desperate need of support, especially the towers.

Al-Khandaq is situated about 423 km north of Khartoum on the left bank of the Nile. The town and its environs, Wad Nimeiri, Magasir Island, Kabtod and Hannek-Koya, include houses, palaces, qubbas, cemeteries and khawas of Islamic date. Al-Khandag was a primary port on the river between the 17th and 20th centuries connecting western Sudan with the river. It was described by the early travellers as one of the best-built towns in Nubia and was the residence of several rich merchants who resided in unique two-storey mud brick houses. The village was constructed on top of a medieval Christian fortress, but rapidly expanded beyond it. The site began to decline during the 1940s as the port faced increasing competition from the railway and road traffic as goods carriers.
