= List of Sudanese artists =

The following list of Sudanese artists (in alphabetical order by last name) includes artists of various genres, who are notable and are either born in Sudan, of Sudanese descent or who produce works that are primarily about that country.

== A ==
- Mohamed Nureldin Abdallah, photojournalist
- Khalid Albaih (born 1980), political cartoonist, activist, and journalist
- Ola Alsheikh, documentary photographer
- Mohamed Altoum, documentary photographer

== B ==
- Salih Basheer (born 1995), photographer

== D ==
- Assil Diab, painter, graphic designer, and graffiti artist
- Rashid Diab (born 1957), modern painter, educator, and art historian

== E ==
- Amna Elhassan (born 1988), painter, printmaker

== I ==
- Kamala Ibrahim Ishaq (born 1939), painter, and art teacher

== K ==
- Omer Khairy (1939–1999), modern painter
- Mohammad Omer Khalil (born 1936), painter, etcher, printmaker
- Ala Kheir (born 1985), photographer, cinematographer, and mechanical engineer

== M ==
- Rashid Mahdi (1923–2008), documentary and portrait photographer
- Omeima Mudawi-Rowlings (born 1969), Sudanese-born British deaf textile artist
- Salah El Mur (born 1966), contemporary painter, graphic designer, author, and filmmaker
- Hassan Musa (born 1951), Sudanese-born French contemporary painter

== S ==
- Ibrahim El-Salahi (born 1930), painter, former public servant, and diplomat
- Alaa Satir (born 1991), illustrator, muralist, and cartoonist
- Hussein Shariffe (1934–2005), painter, filmmaker, poet and educator
- Ahmed Shibrain (1931–2017), modernist painter

== U ==
- Ahmed Umar (artist) (born 1988), Sudanese-born Norwegian visual artist and LGBT activist

== W ==
- Osman Waqialla (1925–2007), painter and calligrapher

== See also ==
- African art
- Photography of Sudan
- Visual arts of Sudan
