= Griselda El Tayib =

British-Sudanese artist and cultural anthropologist (1925–2022)

Griselda El Tayib MBE
- Born: 15 March 1925; UK
- Died: 20 May 2022 (aged 97); Khartoum, Sudan
- Education: University of Khartoum
- Occupations: visual artist, cultural anthropologist
- Notable work: Regional Folk Costumes of the Sudan
- Spouse: Abdullah El Tayeb

Dorothy Griselda El Tayib MBE (15 March 1925 – 20 May 2022) was a British-born visual artist and cultural anthropologist, who was mainly known for her pioneering research on the traditional costumes as they reflect the culture and society of Sudan since the 1970s. She published her research in 2017 in the illustrated book Regional Folk Costumes of the Sudan.

Having lived in Sudan and other African countries for most of her life with her Sudanese husband, academic Abdullah El Tayib, she published ethnographic studies and watercolour paintings on such fields as visual arts of Sudan, folk literature, music, traditional costumes and women's education in Sudan and has been called "a Sudanese artist of British origin".

== Life and career ==
El Tayib studied at the Chelsea School of Art in London, United Kingdom, and moved to Sudan in the 1950s, when she accompanied her husband Abdullah El Tayib after his studies at the University of London. Referring to her long-standing contributions to the arts in Sudan, the authors of the article "Modern Art in Sudan" called her "a Sudanese artist of British origin". Beside her own work as an artist, she initiated courses for art education in schools and colleges of the Sudan, as well as at the Arts Department of the Abdullahi Bayero College (later University of Kano), Nigeria. Her preferred artistic genre was watercolor painting, and her personal style has been called a kind of "realistic impressionism", where she "often succeeds in capturing the essence of life itself."

As the first student of folklore studies at the Institute of African and Asian Studies of the University of Khartoum, she undertook research based on her field work about the regional costumes of several ethnic groups in northern and eastern Sudan, leading to her M.A. thesis in 1976. Some forty years later, she published a revised and updated version of her earlier writing in the book Regional Folk Costumes of the Sudan. Apart from these studies in her main field of expertise, El Tayib also published articles on the Sudanese folk instrument kissar and on women's education in Sudan.

For her contributions to British-Sudanese relations, she was distinguished as a Member of the Order of the British Empire (MBE) in 2002.

=== Publications on contemporary fine arts and African folk stories ===
In 1971, El Tayib co-wrote an article in the journal African Arts on the life and work of the Sudanese painter Omer Kheiry. For her husband's translated collections of folk stories from Sudan and Africa, she illustrated the books Heroes of Arabia and Stories from the sands of Africa. As a commentator on contemporary visual arts of Sudan, El Tayib wrote the introduction to the 2015 book on Contemporary artists of the Sudan: art in times of adversity.

=== Publications on folk costumes ===
Historical photograph from 1901 of a Sudanese woman wearing a nose ring and other characteristic clothing

In 1976, El Tayib published her Illustrated record of Sudanese national costumes. In this study of 320 pages, she described "details of indigenous costumes worn by Sudanese, in North, East and Central Riverain Sudan, during the first half of this century before radical political and social changes introduced an irreversible trend towards westernisation."

The plan was to start with those ethnic groups in Northern Sudan where rapidly increasing urbanization, major mass media influence and the population movements due to resettlement were threatening the extinction of certain distinct forms of dress. The need to record all this in the 1970s was very urgent, for already within two-and-a-half decades I had personally witnessed the disappearance of the bullama face veil, the gurgab, a waist wrapper, the women's markub, flat open shoes, and karkab wooden clogs, and increasingly also of the crescent shaped earrings called fidayat and the zumam, nose ornament, all of which were quite common in the early 1950s.

— Griselda El Tayib, Regional Folk Costumes of the Sudan, p. 15

In the 1987 collective publication The Sudanese Woman, she contributed a chapter on Women's dress in the Northern Sudan.

=== Regional Folk Costumes of the Sudan ===

Published in 2017, El Tayib's illustrated book Regional Folk Costumes of the Sudan is based on her sociocultural and anthropological research and presents her descriptions and paintings of selected Sudanese folk costumes. The scope of this book is limited to specific parts of the country, where the author could undertake field visits, using questionnaires and informal interviews during her research in the 1970s. As the lifestyles of Sudanese in different urban and rural areas vary considerably between traditional and modern forms, the book presents both local and traditional forms of dress as well as contemporary clothes and fashion in urban societies. This applies especially to the final chapter, written in 2016, that describes changes in Sudanese dress since her earlier research. Among other reasons, El Tayib attributed the modern changes in dress and related personal tastes to international influences by television, Arab fashion magazines and the dress codes adopted by the international Sudanese diaspora.

"Whereas nowadays fashion changes, innovations, modifications, hairstyles, trends in gold and other jewellery often emanate from the capital outward, this was not always the case in the past. Each of the regions studied here was subjected to different internal and external influences which affect clothing: trade and availability of various items, or imitation of conquerors, leaders and other high prestige groups."

— Griselda El Tayib, Regional Folk Costumes of the Sudan, p. 17

Since South Sudan became an independent country in 2011, and in light of the large number of ethnic groups in what used to be the southern parts of the former Sudan, these and other geographic areas could not be included in her research, which was dedicated to the eastern and central riverain areas of Sudan.

Taking into account both the material aspects of the costumes as well as the social groups that wear them, the descriptions refer to local materials, different age groups and geographic places, to different items of apparel, jewellery or hairstyles and their names in the local languages. Also, information by shopkeepers, tailors, weavers, indigo dyers and shoemakers was included. The accompanying watercolour illustrations were made by the author herself, in an attempt to present important details and the way the costumes were worn, thus providing advantages over photographs.

The book is divided into the following sections:

1. Historical Threads
2. Nubian Dress
3. Rashaida Costume
4. Beja Apparel - The Halenga - The Beni Amer - The Hadendawa
5. Attire of the Riverain Sudan
6. The Sudanese Tobe
7. Conclusions
8. Then and Now
9. Notes and Bibliography

== Personal life ==
Griselda El Tayib was married to the eminent Sudanese scholar and writer Abdullah El Tayib. Having stayed on in Khartoum after her husband's death, she died on 20 May 2022, at the age of 97.

== See also ==
- Visual arts of Sudan
- Costume
- Thawb
- Jellabiya

== Works cited and further reading ==
- El Tayib, Griselda (1976) Illustrated record of Sudanese national costumes. Khartoum: Institute of African and Asian Studies OCLC 758743198
- El Tayib, Griselda; El-Nager, Sara; Nagy, Enikö (2017). Regional folk costumes of the Sudan. ISBN 978-3-940190-96-3. OCLC 1056575561.
- Brown, Marie Grace (2017). Khartoum at Night: Fashion and Body Politics in Imperial Sudan. Stanford, CA: Stanford University Press. ISBN 9781503602687.
- Cosgrave, Bronwyn (2000). The complete history of costume & fashion: from ancient Egypt to the present day. New York: Checkmark Books. ISBN 0-8160-4574-7.
- Daum, Werner and Rashid Diab (2009). Modern Art in Sudan In Hopkins, Peter G. (ed.) Kenana Handbook of Sudan. New York: Routledge, pp. 453–516 ISBN 0-7103-1160-5
- Faris, James C (1972). Nuba personal art. London: Duckworth. ISBN 978-0-7156-0594-3. OCLC 883716226.
