= Amir Nour =

Sudanese-American visual artist (1936-2021)

- Amir Nour with his work in 1962
- Born: April 26, 1936; Shendi, Sudan
- Died: 2021; Chicago, United States
- Education: Yale University, University of St. Andrews, Scotland
- Style: Contemporary African art, Minimalism
- Website: https://www.amirnour.com/

Amir Nour (Arabic: عامر نور; 26 April 1936 – 2021), was a Sudanese-American sculptor and academic. His works have been exhibited in the United States and internationally, including the United Kingdom, Germany, France, Cuba and the United Arab Emirates.

After having obtained degrees from the University of London, Yale University, and the University of St. Andrews, he worked and taught Fine Art in Chicago, where he lived until the end of his life in 2021.

== Biography and artistic career ==
In 1957 Nour graduated from the School of Fine and Applied Art in Khartoum, whereupon he became an art teacher from 1958 to 1959 and 1963 to 1965. Following this, he studied sculpture and African art at the Slade School of Fine Art of the University of London, United Kingdom and at the Royal College of Art in London. In 1967, he obtained a Rockefeller scholarship to continue his studies of sculpture and lithography at Yale University in the United States, which he finished with a Bachelor's and Master's degree in Fine Arts. After this, he became an art teacher at the City Colleges of Chicago. In 2006, he took a sabbatical leave and received a Ph.D. in African Art History from the University of St. Andrews in Scotland.

Nour frequently chose geometric forms related to the history, environment and tradition of Sudan, relating to Nubian culture and the country's Afro-Islamic culture. His sculptures, made of such materials as concrete, fibreglass or steel, are abstract and minimalist, citing animals, landscape and architecture of the country of his birth.

Nour's works have been internationally presented in museums and through publications, with some of his sculptures in the collection of the National Museum of African Art, Washington, D.C. In 2002, the Museum of Modern Art's P.S.1 Contemporary Art Center in New York exhibited Nour's sculptures in The Short Century: Independence and Liberation Movements in Africa, 1945–1994, a comprehensive exhibition exploring African culture through art, film, photography, graphics, architecture, music, literature, and theatre. In 2016, the Sharjah Art Foundation presented the exhibition "Amir Nour: Brevity is the Soul of Wit: A Retrospective (1965-present)".

== Personal life ==
Nour was married to Ann Morrison from Edinburgh, Scotland, whom he had met as a student in London. She was a physical therapist at the Schwab Rehabilitation Institute, and from 1980 onwards, director of Rehab Medicine at the Osteopathic Hospital in Hyde Park, Chicago. Amir Nour died in Chicago at age 84 in 2021.

== Major exhibitions and collections ==
- Creative Impulses/Modern Expressions - Four African Artists: Skunder Boghossian, Rashid Diab, Mohammed Omer Khalil, Amir Nour, African Studies and Research Center, Cornell University, Ithaca, 1993.
- Grazing at Shendi, sculpture made of 202 pieces in steel, Smithsonian National Museum of African Art, 1969.
- Horned Gate, Museum of Fine Arts, St Petersburg, Florida, 1974.
- The Short Century: Independence and Liberation Movements in Africa, 1945–1994. Museum of Modern Art, New York.
- Brevity is the Soul of Wit: A Retrospective (1965-present), Sharjah Art Foundation, 2016.

== See also ==
- Visual arts of Sudan
