= Visual arts of Sudan =

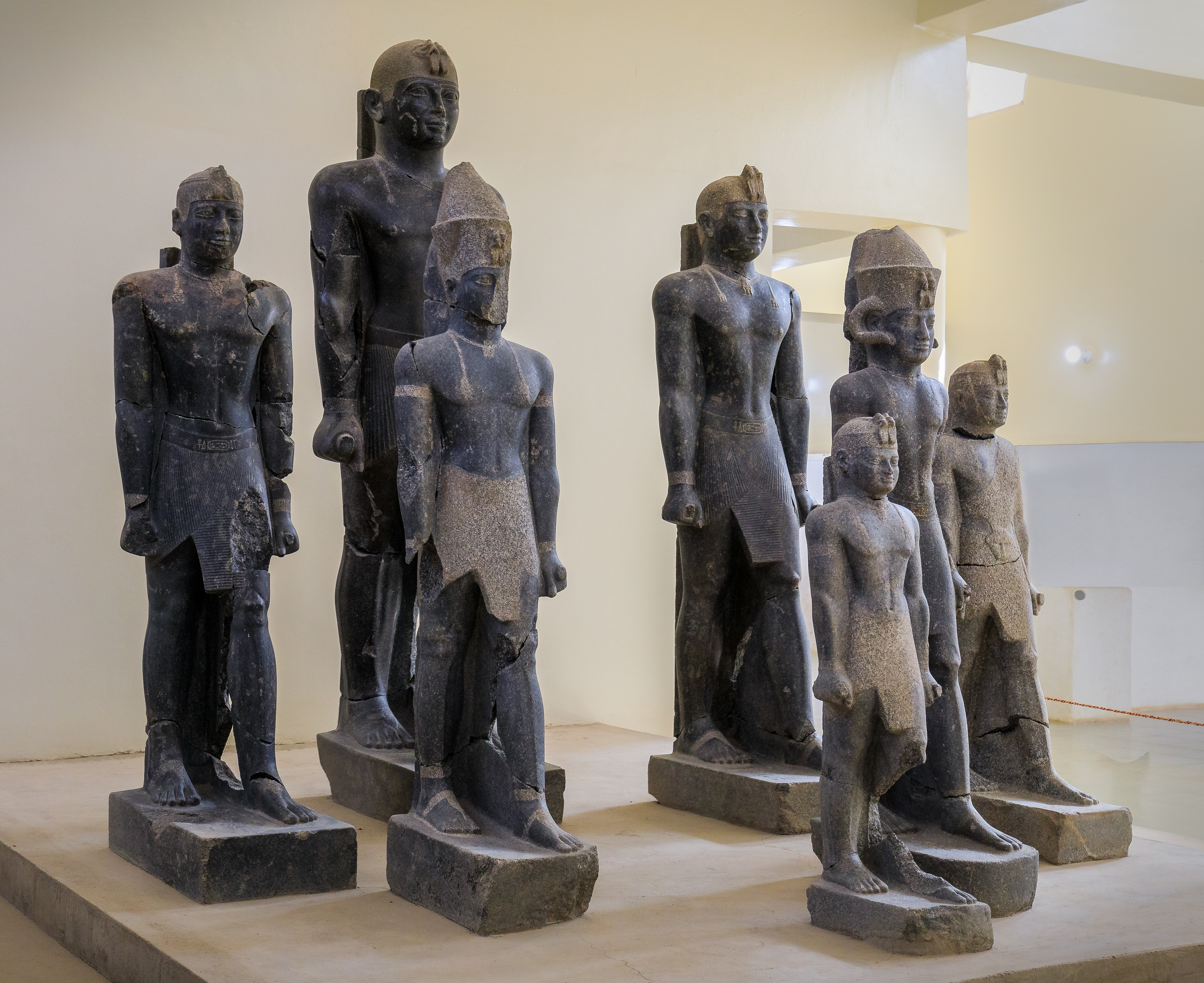
Rulers of Kush, 7th century BCE, Kerma museum

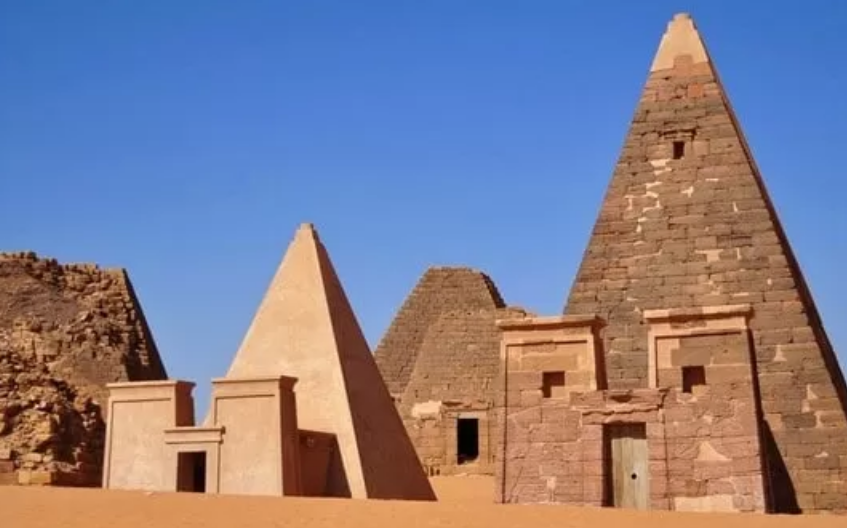
Nubian pyramids of Meroe, 300 BCE to about 350 CE

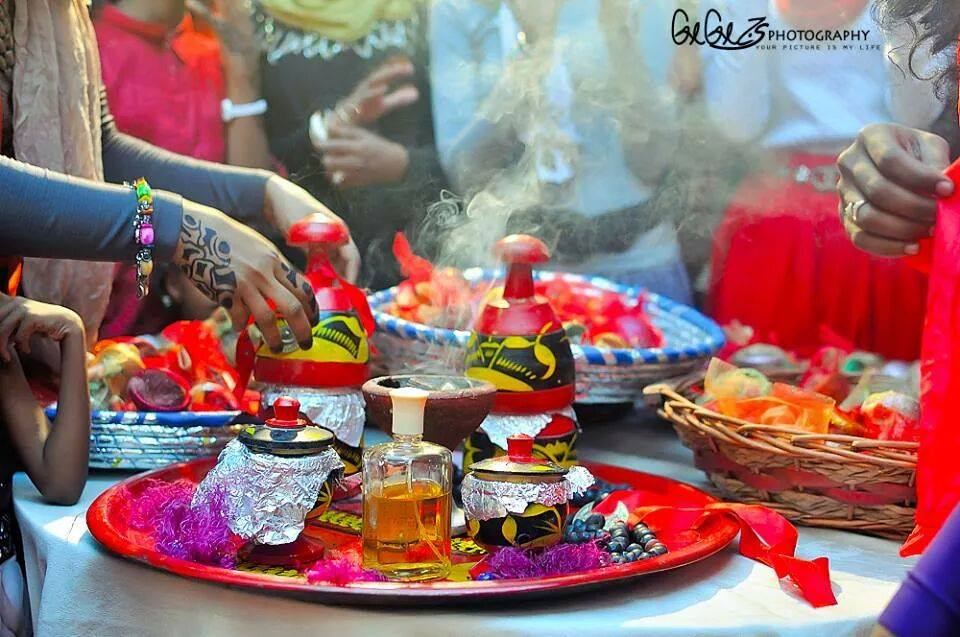
Sudanese jirtig ceremony as part of wedding celebrations

The visual arts of Sudan encompass the historical and contemporary production of objects made by the inhabitants of today's Republic of the Sudan and specific to their respective cultures. This encompasses objects from cultural traditions of the region in North-East Africa historically referred to as the Sudan, including the southern regions that became independent as South Sudan in 2011.

Throughout its history, Sudan has been a crossroads between North Africa, Egypt, Mediterranean cultures, parts of West Africa and the Red Sea coast in the east of the country. Before the 20th century, these cultural traditions were influenced by indigenous African, Pharaonic, Greco-Roman, Byzantine and Arabic cultures that have brought about a large diversity of cultural expressions, often specific to the ethnic or social group that produced and used them. (Note: In the article on the cultural life in Sudan, the Encyclopædia Britannica writes: "The key to an understanding of contemporary Sudanese culture is diversity. Each major ethnic group and historical region has its own special forms of cultural expression. (...) Because of Sudan's great cultural diversity, it is difficult to classify the traditional cultures of the various peoples. Sudan's traditional societies have diverse linguistic, ethnic, social, cultural, and religious characteristics. And, although improved communications, increased social and economic mobility, and the spread of a money economy have led to a general loosening of the social ties, customs, relationships, and modes of organization in traditional cultures, much from the past still remains intact." "Sudan – Cultural life". Encyclopedia Britannica.) As expressions of the material culture of a society, applied arts and handicrafts are included with the fine arts in this history of the arts in Sudan.

Starting in the early 19th century, the establishment of first the Turkish-Egyptian and later the Anglo-Egyptian rule, characterised by foreign military and political domination, ushered in the gradual evolution of a modern nation state with new cultural influences on the lifestyles and material culture of the Sudanese.

After independence in 1956, Sudanese graduates of the colonial education system took over leading positions in the new state and thus contributed to the emergence of urban culture and modern art. These cultural developments became most visible from the 1950s to the 1980s, a period that was later called "The Making of the Modern Art Movement in Sudan".

In the 21st century, visual artistic developments in the country have been characterised by digital forms of communication, including audio-visual art spread and received through satellite television, online media as well as images and films shared through social media. (Note: This is mainly true for people with access to electronic devices, which still excludes large sections of Sudanese society, especially in rural areas. These changes in communication, style of life and general attitudes are of growing importance.) During the Sudanese Revolution of 2018 and 2019, young artists contributed to the protests and morale of the popular movement, creating wall paintings, graffiti, cartoons, photographs or video messages.

== Historical periods preceding contemporary Sudan ==
=== Prehistoric times ===
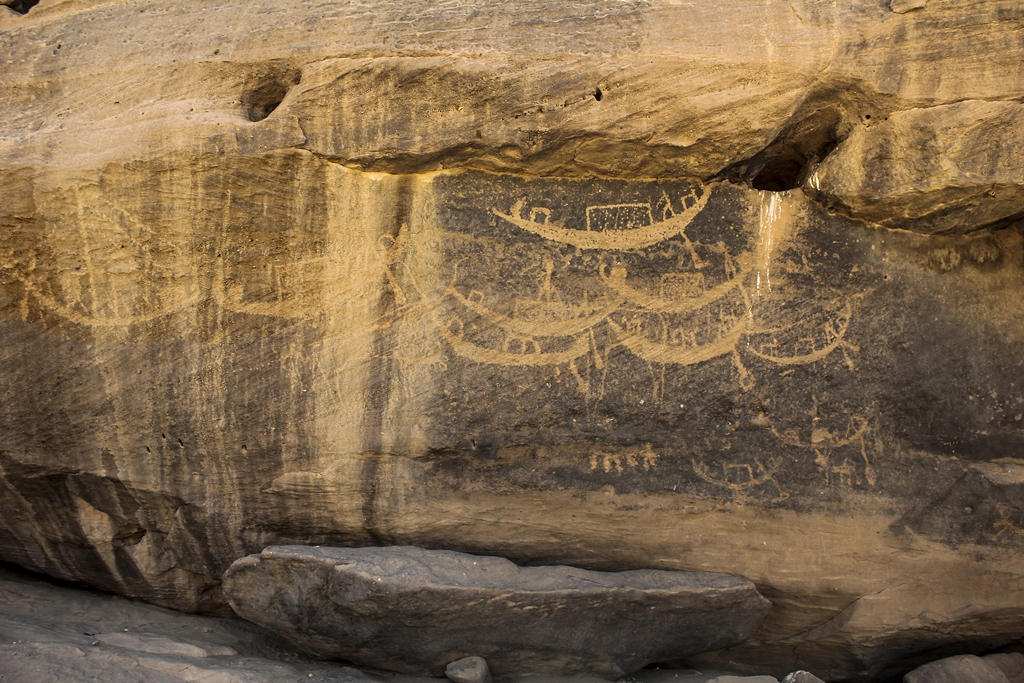
Rock engraving of Nile boats in Sabu-Jaddi, circa 1570–1100 BCE

The oldest existent objects of material artifacts in Nubia, such as stone tools, date back to prehistoric times. The Sabu-Jaddi rock art site is a unique cluster of more than 1600 rock drawings from different historical periods expanding for more than 6000 years through different eras of Nubian civilization. The well-preserved drawings represent wild and domestic animals, humans and boats and were included by the World Monuments Fund in its list of monuments to watch. Other ancient rock drawings were found in the arid valley known as Wadi Abu Dom in the Bayuda Desert. Another important prehistoric site was found in the border region between Sudan, Libya and Egypt in the Gabal El Uweinat mountain range. In Sudan's western region, the Jebel Mokram Group, characterized by its pottery and small clay figures of animals, was a prehistoric, Neolithic culture that flourished in the second millennium BCE.

=== Kerma and the Kingdom of Kush ===
From the Kerma culture (2500–1500 BCE), the seat of one of the earliest civilizations of ancient Africa, weapons, items of pottery and other household objects are presented in museums such as the National Museum of Sudan, Kerma Museum, British Museum, Museum of Fine Arts, Boston and the Metropolitan Museum of Art.

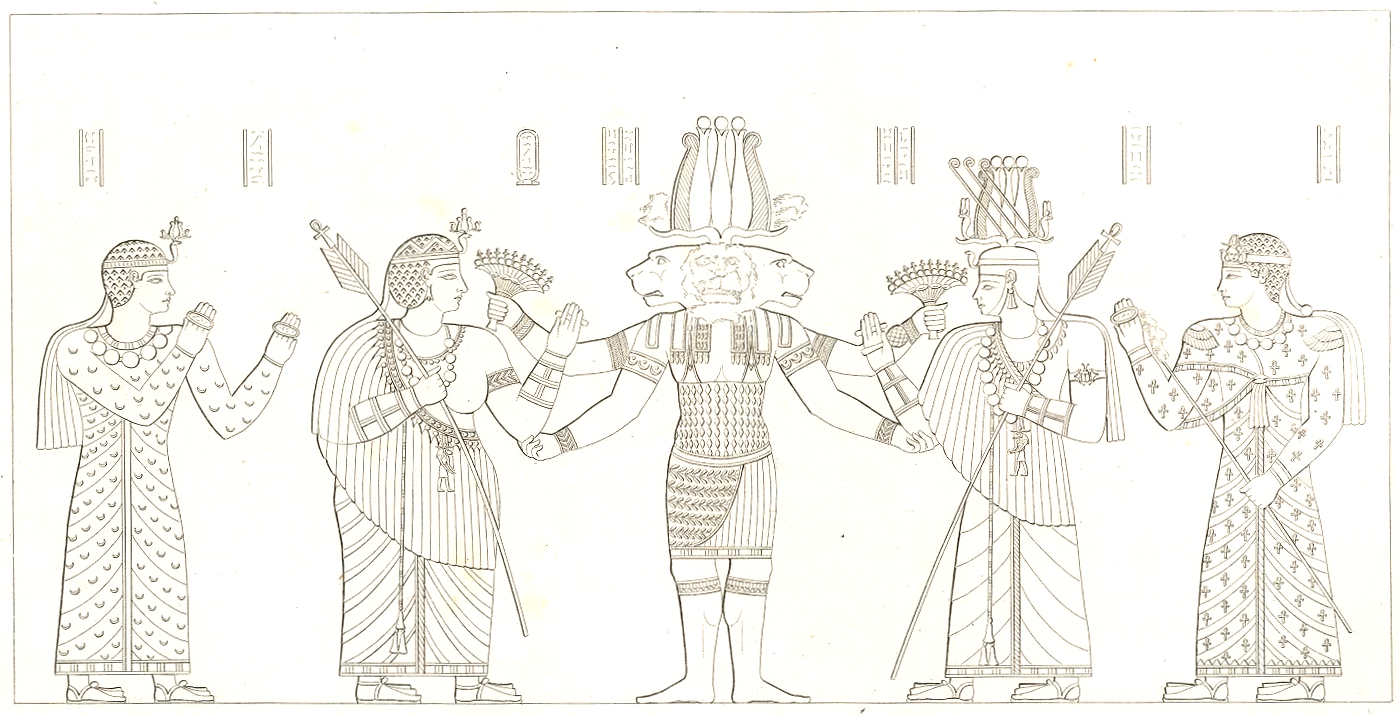
Lion temple relief, depicting Natakamani and Amanitore at Naqa

During the Kingdom of Kush (about 950 BCE–CE 350), when the monarchs of Kush ruled their northern neighbour Egypt as pharaos for over a century, Nubian statues like the sphinx of Taharqa acquired Egyptian features and were erected in temples or Nubian pyramids, such as in Meroe, one of Sudan's World Heritage Sites. Among other resources, the material culture of ancient Nubia used gold, ivory, ebony, incense, hides or precious stones, and necklaces or bracelets have been found in tombs of royal families. Nubian kings and queens, the latter called Kandakes of Kush, were represented in stone reliefs on temples, like the one dedicated to Apedemak (The Lion Temple) at Naqa. Other examples of ancient Nubian architecture are rock-cut temples, mud-brick temples called deffufa, graves with stoned walls or dwellings made of mudbricks, wood and stone floors, palaces and well laid out roads.

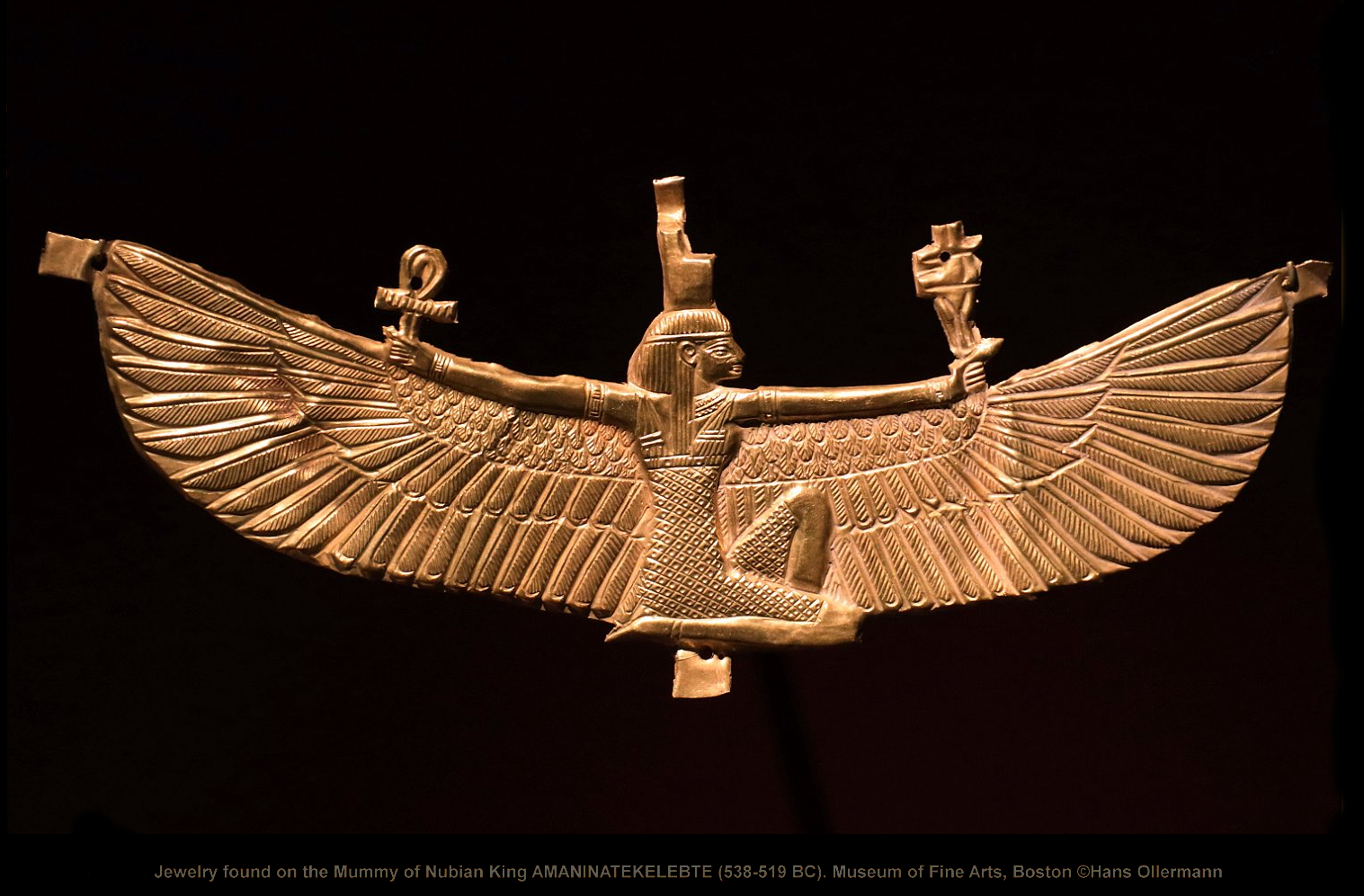
Jewellery found on the mummy of Nubian king Amaninatakilebte (538-519 BC).

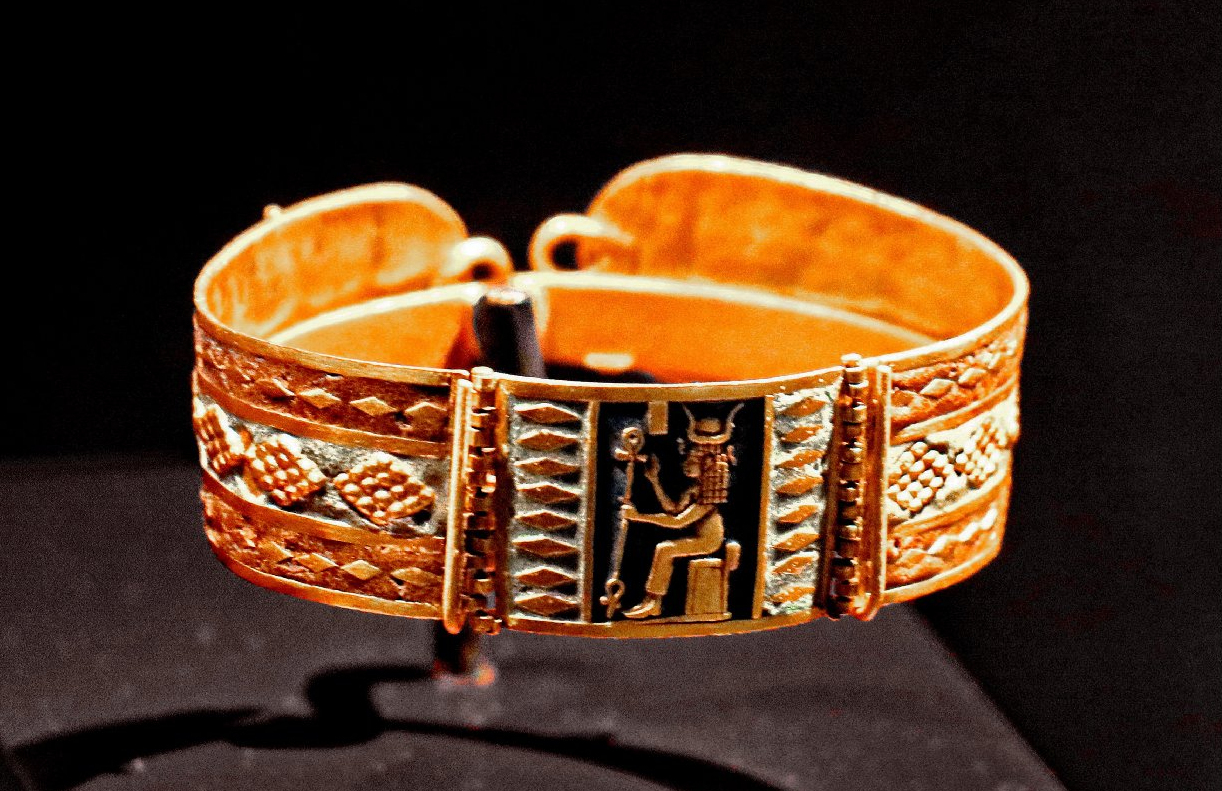
Golden Bracelet found in the tomb of a member of the Royal Family in Jebel Barkal

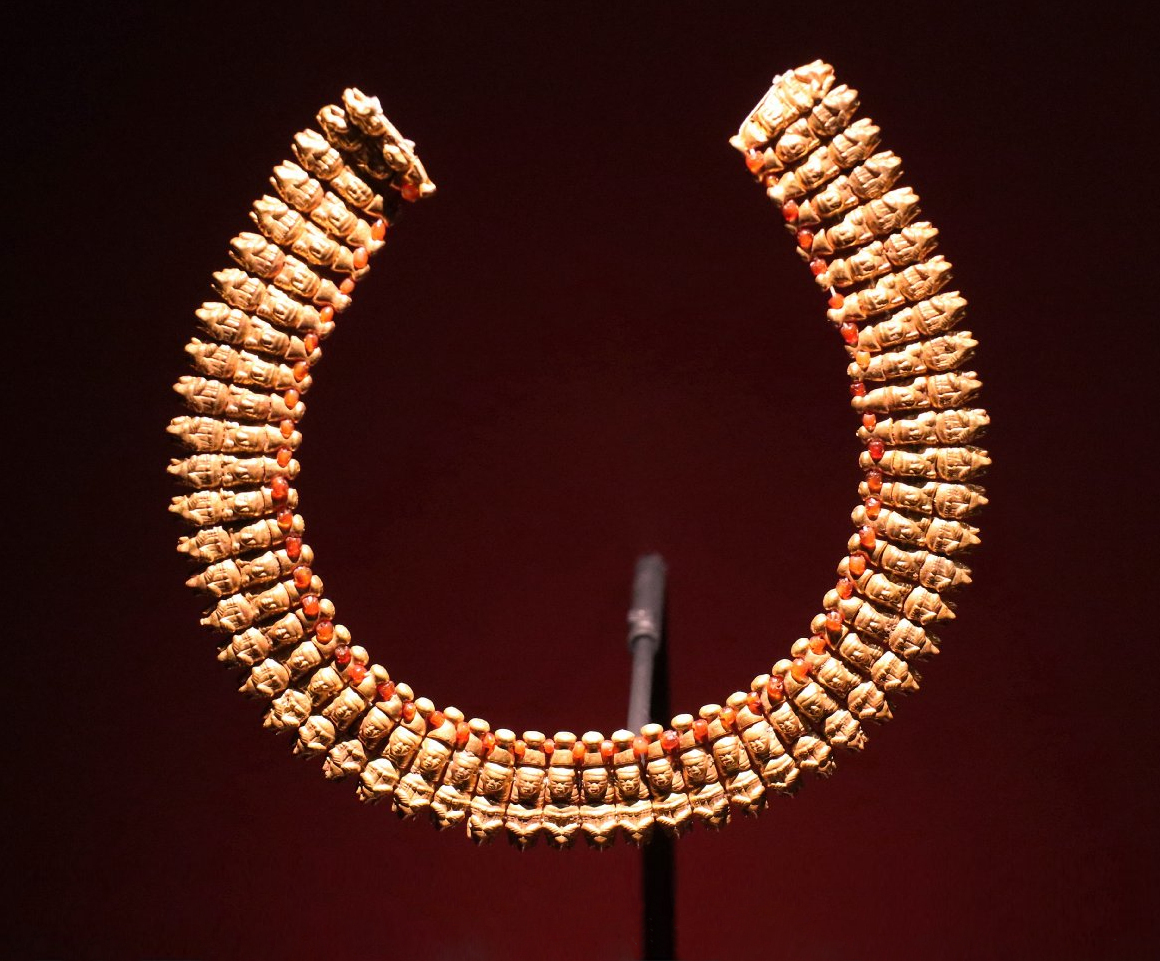
Necklace made of gold pendants with a small carnelian bead between each. Meroitic period.

=== Influences by Greco-Roman culture ===
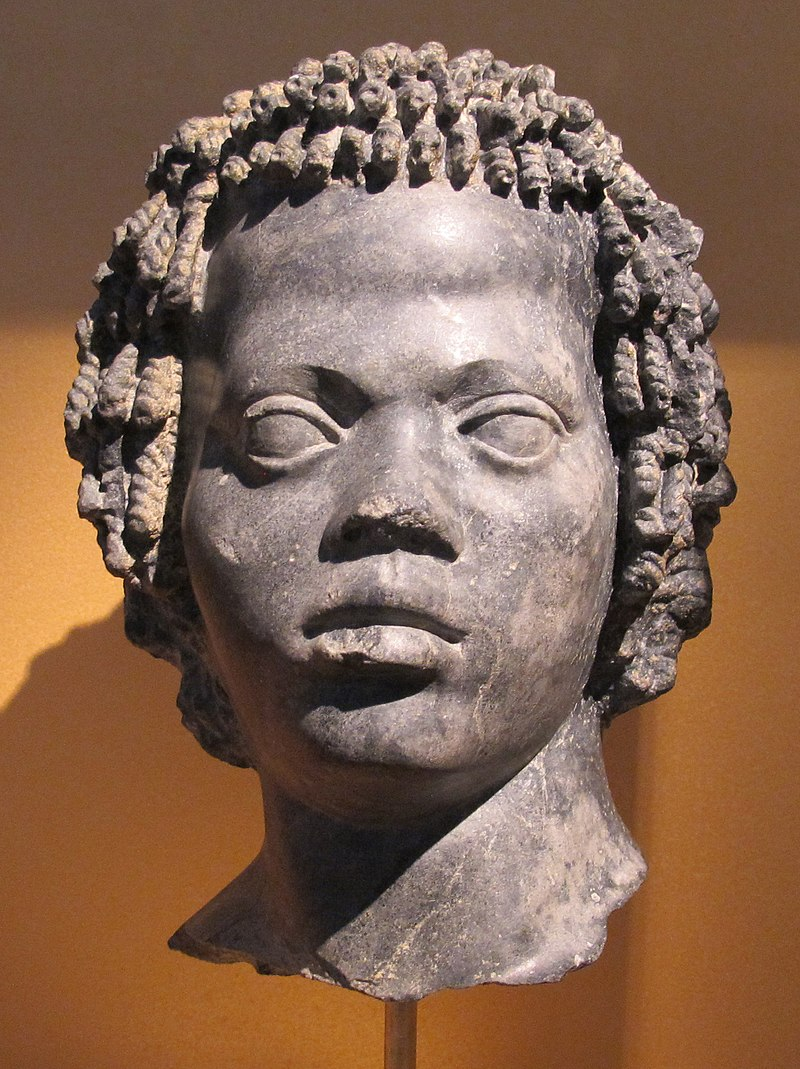
Marble head of a Nubian, ca. 120–100 BCE, Ptolemaic Period

From the 3rd century BCE to the 3rd century CE, northern Nubia was invaded and annexed to Egypt, which was ruled by the Ptolemaic Kingdom and later the Roman Empire. Cultural influences of this period as far south as in Nubia can be seen in the so-called 'Roman baths' in Meroe, an excavated building called "an outstanding example of cultural transfer between the African kingdom and the Greco-Roman culture of the Mediterranean." (Note: Another example of Roman art is the so-called Meroë Head, or Head of Augustus from Meroë, a larger-than-life-size bronze head depicting the first Roman emperor, Augustus, that was found in the ancient Nubian site of Meroë in 1910, and then was taken to the British Museum.)

Another example of cultural influence from Nubia during Ptolemaic rule in Egypt is a marble head of a Nubian young man, probably made in the Eastern Mediterranean Region, and now exhibited in the Brooklyn Museum in the US.

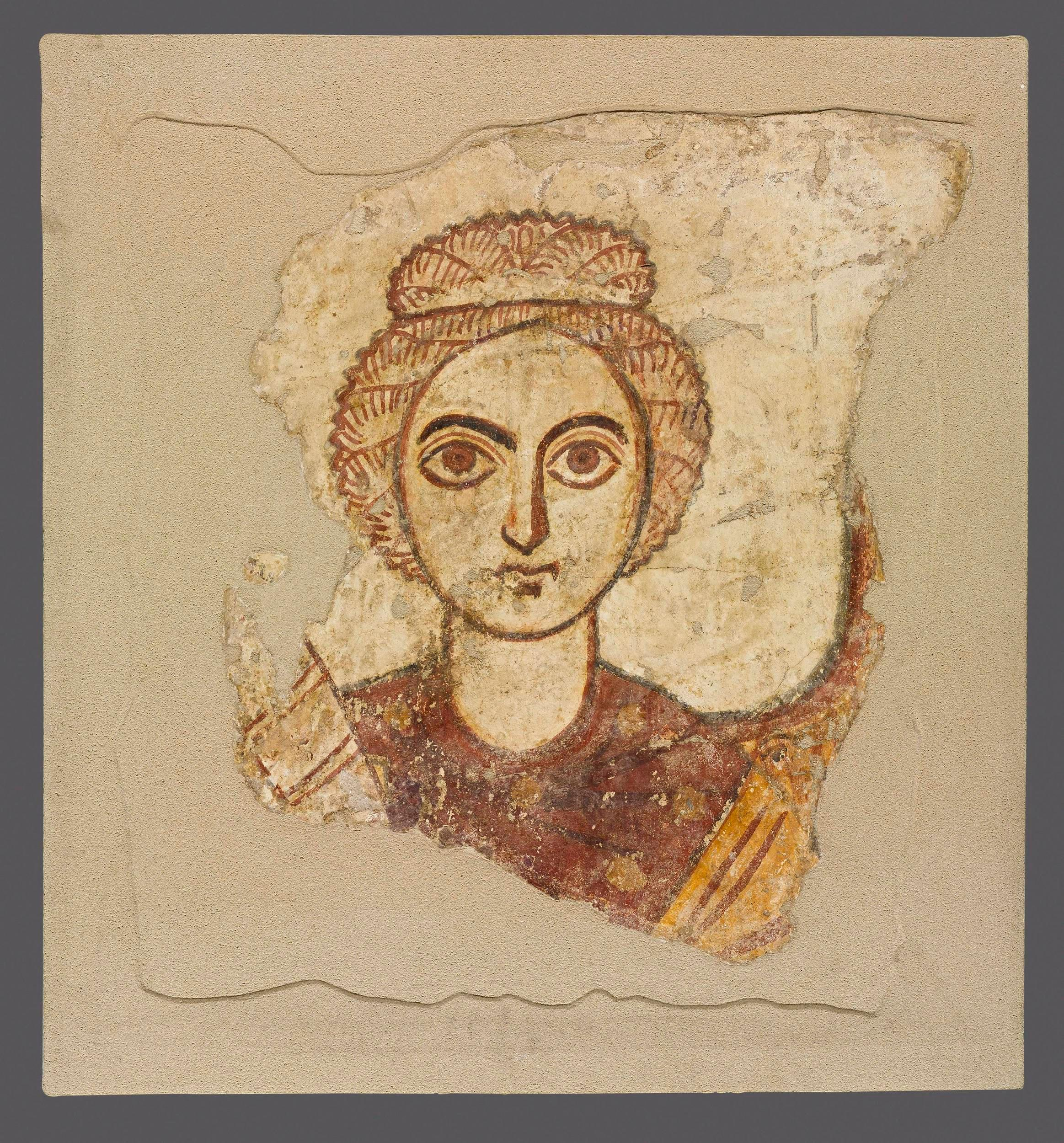
Archangel Michael, Faras, 9th cent. in National Museum Warsaw

=== Medieval Nubia ===
In medieval Nubia (c. 500–1500 CE), the inhabitants of the Christian kingdoms Makuria, Nobadia, and Alodia produced distinct forms of architecture, like the Faras Cathedral, sculptures, and wall paintings, of which more than 650 have been published in modern scholarly texts. These relate to the Coptic art of Egypt, and sometimes to Ethiopian art. They used the Old Nubian language, Coptic, Greek or Arabic for different religious or secular texts, preserved on manuscripts or as inscriptions on sandstone, marble or terracotta.

Even though Muslim migrants, probably merchants and artisans, are confirmed to have settled in Lower Nubia from the 9th century onwards, the actual Islamization of Nubia began in the late 14th century.

=== Arrival of Islam and Arabization ===
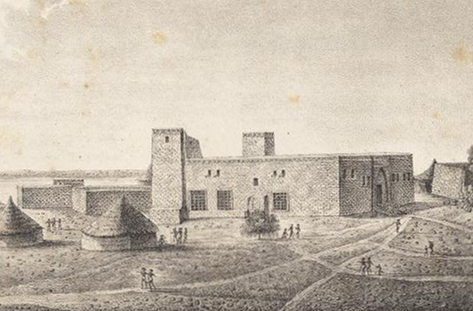
A mosque in Sennar, illustration by Frédéric Cailliaud, early 19th cent.

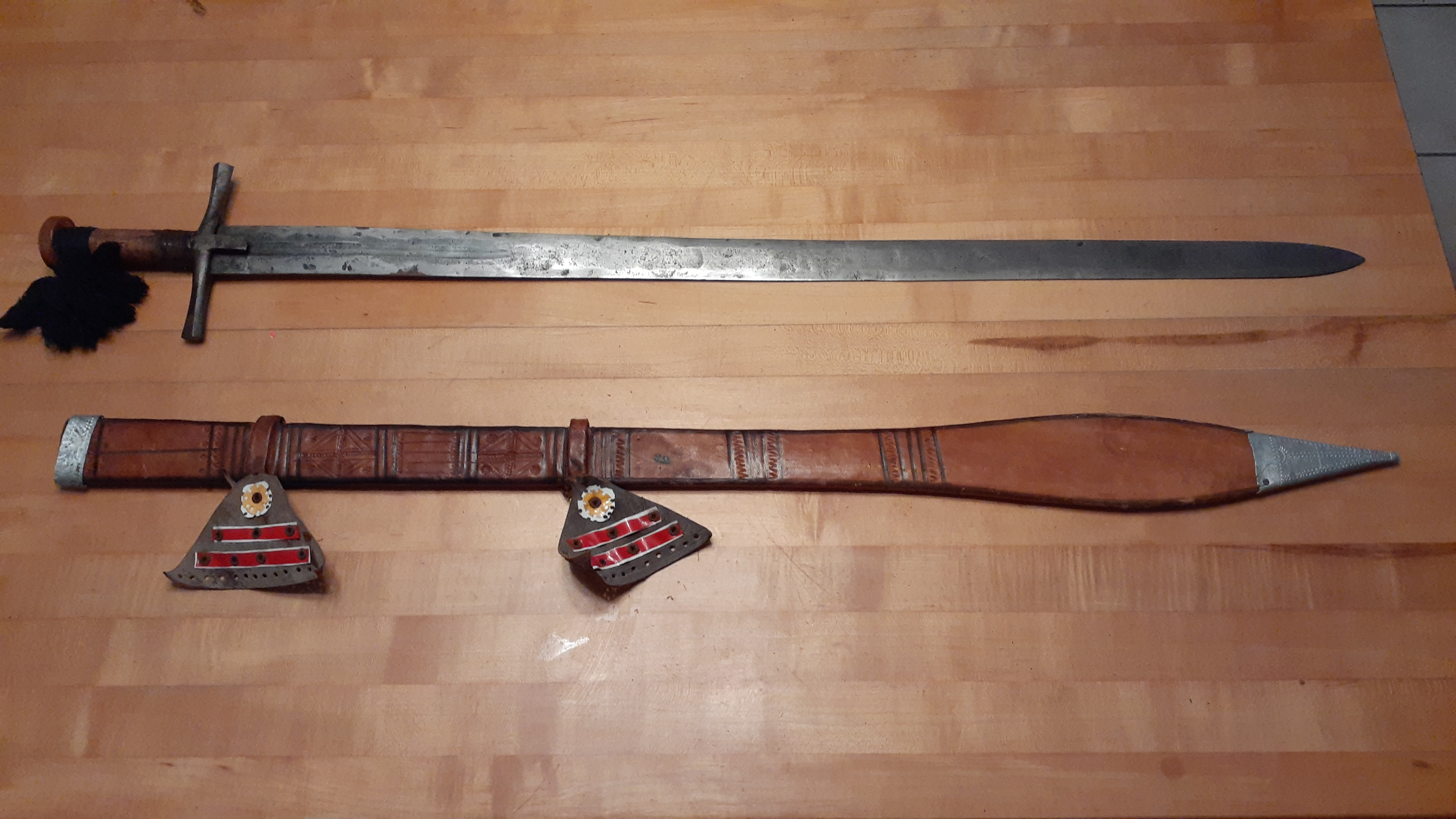
Sudanese kaskara with scabbard

In the 16th and 17th centuries, new Islamic kingdoms were established – the Funj Sultanate and the Sultanate of Darfur, starting a long period of gradual Islamization and Arabization in Sudan. These sultanates and their societies existed until the Sudan was conquered by the Ottoman Egyptian invasion in 1820, and in the case of Darfur, even until 1916. Major cultural changes of this period were marked by the adoption of the Islamic religion and growing use of the Arabic Language as elements of everyday life. Other cultural developments were reported by foreign visitors such as Frédéric Cailliaud and relate to the architecture of towns and mosques, the manufacture of weapons like throwing knives or kaskara swords (Note: "While most surviving examples are from the 19th century, the kaskara is believed to have originated around the early 14th century, and may represent a localized survival of the straight, double-edged medieval Arab sword." Source: Wills, Chuck (2006). Weaponry: An Illustrated History. Irvington, NY: Hylas Publishing. pp. 90–91. ISBN 978-1-59258-127-6.) – and the slave trade. In this period, schools for the Arabic language and for Islamic studies, called khalwa, were founded and Sufi brotherhoods took roots in Sudan. Examples of their material culture are a flag with the Islamic statement of faith, now in the British Museum, or a wooden tablet of the late 19th century, used as writing board for students learning the Quran, presented online by the Brooklyn Museum, New York City. (Note: According to the Brooklyn Museum webpage, "students would have used wooden writing boards like this one as a notebook, copy book, or slate, practicing their calligraphy and memorizing passages from the Qur'an. In addition to Arabic script, geometric borders, curlicues, stylized drawings of scorpions, four-legged animals, and men on horseback embellish this writing board.")

=== The 19th and 20th century until independence ===
From the beginning of the 19th century onwards, drawings or photographs, taken by foreign visitors, constitute some of the earliest records for the traditional arts of different ethnic and social groups, such as architecture, dress, hairstyles, jewellery or scarifications.

After the first period of Turkish-Egyptian rule (1821–1885), the Mahdist State (1885–1899) left important traces in Omdurman, one of the three major areas of greater Khartoum. The tomb of the Mahdi, the Khalifa House, Mahdist coins and specific types of dress, like the jibba coat worn by the Mahdi's followers, bear witness to the cultural character of this period.

In the early 19th century, Egyptians, British and other foreign inhabitants of Khartoum had expanded the city from a military encampment to a town of hundreds of brick-built houses. And during the condominium of the Anglo-Egyptian Sudan (1899–1956), the British army and civil administration ushered in important changes in the society, economy and culture.

The British administration also introduced a Western system of education, with Gordon Memorial College for higher learning and Art Education in schools, and a School of Design opened in 1945.This is regarded as the start for the development of modern art in Sudan, and painting or sculpture in the Western sense began to take roots. Historian Heather J. Sharkey made the following comment on the influence of visual culture through the British educational system: "Photographs and pictures enabled the boys and Old boys of Gordon College to see and hence to imagine the world, the British Empire, and the Sudan in new ways, visual culture was as important to the development of nationalism as the culture of words." It was precisely in the emerging visual art of documentary films that Gadalla Gubara, said to have been the first Sudanese cameraman, was trained for the Colonial Film Unit.

To train teachers, especially for vocational training, an art course was introduced in the Institute of Education in 1943 and three years later, a School of Design was established. In 1951, this school was moved to the Khartoum Technical Institute, and in 1971, it became the College of Fine and Applied Art of the Sudan University of Science and Technology (SUSTECH). Despite considerable setbacks caused mainly by the neglect of several governments, it continues into the early 2020s and is the place where many of Sudan's modern visual artists and musicians have started their artistic education.

== Traditional applied arts and crafts ==
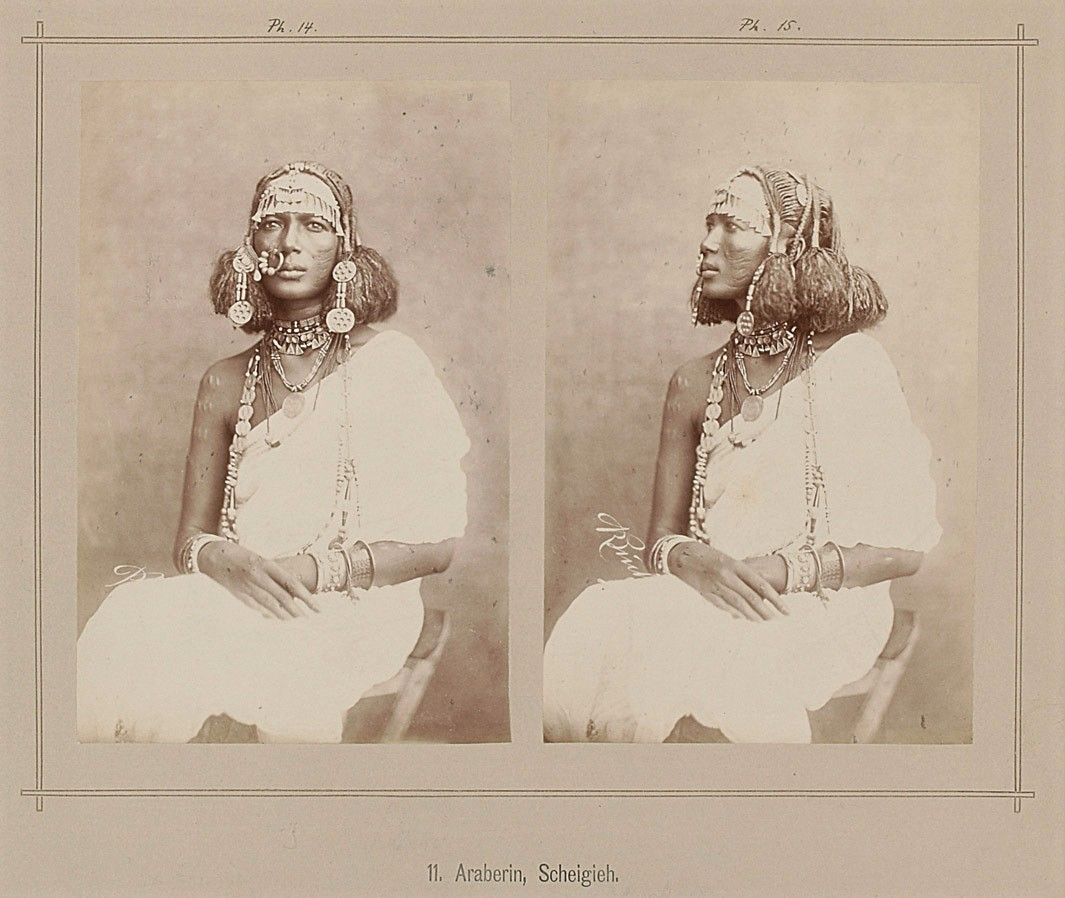
Shaigiya woman with jewellery and traditional dress, c. 1880

In accordance with contemporary notions of material culture of any social group, the terms traditional arts, folk arts, applied arts, crafts or handicrafts refer to a wide range of cultural objects made by humans. Apart from the so-called Fine Arts, this applies to such diverse Sudanese creations of textiles and dress, including the traditional galabiya, turbans and skullcaps for men or the veils and toub for women, to shoes and other kinds of leatherwork such as sandals, leather talismans containing sacred script or to jewellery and other kinds of personal adornment, like henna ornaments on hands or ankles. Sudanese traditions of woodwork, pottery or metalcraft can be found in traditional furniture like the angareeb bedsteads, in earthenware vessels for drinking water placed outside private houses, as containers for burning incense or as traditional coffee pots called jabana.

In 2017, cultural anthropologist Griselda El Tayib published her book Regional Folk Costumes of the Sudan with illustrations of dress and other kinds of personal adornment from different ethnic groups of Sudan. Also, ethnic traditions of body art such as cicatrizations, hairstyles, like braids or the so-called fuzzy-wuzzy hairstyles of Hadendoa men, modern dreadlocks and make-up have been or still are in everyday use. On the same topic, The Grove Encyclopedia of Islamic Art and Architecture cautions that "By the 1990s many of Sudan's traditional arts were under threat from modernization and the importation of mass-produced goods."

In a 2013 interview in El Fasher, Darfur, art historian Gibreel Abdulaziz spoke about the long history and development of local handicrafts and art forms such as rock painting, engraving on stone and leather or calligraphy. Citing examples from his 700-page book on the history of El Fasher and its historical development, he described the evolution of these traditional artistic practices over time, as well as modern developments of the arts in Darfur until the 21st century.

== 20th-century modern art ==
=== The beginnings in the 1940s and up to the 1960s ===
Referring to an early group of graphic artists and painters of the late 1940s in Khartoum, the overview on 'Modern art in Sudan', published in 2009 by scholars Werner Daum and Rashid Diab, mentions the 'Art of the Coffee Houses' (fann al-maqāhi). These artists produced Sudanese motifs for product packaging and the first documented paintings on easels, and their artistic output is said to reflect the emerging urban society in the capital, with modern art replacing ethnic traditions limited to a specific tribal culture. (Note: These popular coffee houses were called Al-Zaybiq or Wad al-Agha, and the artists named by Daum and Diab are Ali Uthman (1936–1959), Mustafa al-'Arifi (1927–1979), Ahmad Salim, Abu al-Hasan al-Madani, Hasan al-Batal, 'Uyun Kadis (Cat's Eye) and Musa Qism al-Din, also called Jiha (b. 1931). The latter used water colours and charcoal, and is known for his package labels depicting historical and religious personalities or the faces of young women with distinctive Sudanese features. Other public spaces used for such visual publicity were the outside of shops or trucks, as they still exist today, and the authors see this applied art as "paving the way for contemporary art". (Daum and Diab, 2009, p. 459f))

The decisive period for the emergence of the 'Khartoum School of Modern Art', however, started in the mid-1950s, when the first Sudanese figurative artists returned home after their postgraduate studies in England. Their work began to be recognized both at home and abroad, and became known as an important contribution towards the development of contemporary African art.

In their overview, Daum and Diab characterized modern Sudanese art as "vacillating between the affirmation of its own roots and Western influence. [...] The first movement tried to read Sudanese heritage and culture as the basic factor for artistic creativity, [...] influenced by the social condition of this particular Arab–Islamic–African culture. The next generation would adopt Western schools and styles in full, such as abstract painting, cubism or surrealism in a move to affirm the universality of art. The third trend could be considered a middle way between the two: the usage of Sudanese, Arab and African elements in a quest for identity without making direct allusions to them, but transforming and developing them in an innovative way."

After graduating in Khartoum, many of the students studied in London, where they were introduced to the products of different cultures, including African and Islamic arts exhibited in British museums and galleries. This opportunity to study their own artistic traditions came at a time when Sudanese nationalism was at its peak (1950s–1960s). On returning to Sudan they were highly conscious of their artistic heritage and of the value of indigenous crafts. They began to define themselves as Sudanese artists and developed styles based in their own cultures, using the motifs and patterns of Sudanese Arabic calligraphy and craft works. The absence of a tradition in painting and sculpture left room for exploring indigenous cultures with a fresh vision and gave rise to new trends in contemporary Sudanese art.

— The Grove Encyclopedia of Islamic Art and Architecture

=== Major exhibitions and collections ===
In 1995, the Whitechapel Gallery in London presented the exhibition Seven Stories about Modern Art in Africa as part of the festival africa95. Clémentine Deliss, the main curator, stated that the exhibition invited "the audience to experience a small part of the conceptual and aesthetic manifestations of the visual arts in Africa during the second half of the twentieth century." This exhibition and the participation by curators and artists from Africa or the African diaspora were later judged as one of the most important events of the festival. Participating artists from Sudan were Mo Abarro, Rashid Diab, Kamala Ibrahim Ishaq, Abdel Basit El Khatim, Severino Matti, Hassan Musa, Amir Nour, Ibrahim El-Salahi and Osman Waqialla.

In 2016, the Sharjah Art Foundation, United Arab Emirates, presented a commemorative exhibition entitled 'The Khartoum School – The Making of the Modern Art Movement in Sudan (1945–present)', including paintings, photographs and sculptures of Sudanese visual artists, such as paintings by Hussein Shariffe and Ibrahim El Salahi or photographs by Rashid Mahdi and Gadalla Gubara. Other artists representing the modernist movement in Sudan were Osman Waqialla, Bastawi Baghdadi, Ahmed Shibrain, Abdelrazig Abdelghaffar, Mohammad Omer Khalil, Tag el-Sir Ahmed, Mohamed El Hassan Abdel Rahim, called Shaigi, Siddig El Nigoumi, Magdoub Rabbah, Ahmed Hamid Al Arabi and Griselda El-Tayib. This retrospective show was complemented by two separate solo exhibitions, focusing on paintings by Kamala Ibrahim Ishaq and sculptures by Amir Nour.

On the occasion of their retrospective exhibition of works by Ibrahim el-Salahi in 2016, the Tate Modern art gallery in London called the Khartoum School "a modernist art movement formed in Sudan in 1960 that sought to develop a new visual vocabulary to reflect the distinctive identity of the newly independent nation."

The Barjeel Art Foundation in the United Arab Emirates presents Sudanese paintings by Abdel Qader Hassan, Kamala Ibrahim Ishaq, Mohammed Omar Khalil, Omer Khairy, Ibrahim El-Salahi, Hussein Shariffe, Ahmad Shibrain and graphic art by Khalid Albaih on their online page.

=== Individual artists ===
Osman Waqialla (1925–2007) worked as painter and calligrapher. He graduated from the School of Design, Gordon Memorial College in Khartoum in 1945, and later continued his artistic studies in London and Cairo. His use of Arabic calligraphy as a modern, non-religious graphic form places Waqialla within the Arabic art movement that became known as the Hurufiyya movement. In the early 1960s, some of his students in Khartoum, such as Ahmad Mohammed Shibrain (b. 1931), Ibrahim el-Salahi (b. 1930) and Tag el-Sir Ahmed (b. 1933) joined Waqialla in creating the Sudanese art movement later to be called the 'Khartoum School of Modern Art'.

Griselda El Tayib (1928–2022) was a British-born art historian, art educator and visual artist, who is mainly known for her pioneering research and watercolour paintings of the traditional costumes, as they reflect the culture and society of Sudan since the 1970s. Referring to her long-standing contributions to the arts in Sudan, the authors of the article "Modern Art in Sudan" called her "a Sudanese artist of British origin". Ibrahim el-Salahi (b. 1930) has become known for the widest international recognition for any painter from Sudan. He is considered to be one of the foremost members of the 'Khartoum School of African Modernism' and the Hurufiyya art movement, which sought to combine traditional forms of Islamic calligraphy with contemporary art. In 2016, the Tate Modern art gallery in London presented the exhibition 'Ibrahim El-Salahi: a visionary modernist' with 100 works, spanning more than fifty years of the artist's international career. It called El-Salahi "one of the most significant figures in African and Arab Modernism", setting his work in the context of the global history of art.

Ahmed Shibrain (b. 1931) studied at the College of Fine and Applied Arts in Khartoum and then at the Central School of Arts and Design in London, specializing in graphic design. After his return to Sudan in 1960, he established a department for Graphic Design at the College of Fine and Applied Arts, where he also acted as dean. Shibrain became known for his modern forms of calligraphy in his paintings and is considered part of the hurufiyya movement, as well as one of the artists of the 'School of Khartoum'.

Siddiq El Nigoumi (1931–1996), created artistic pottery. Educated first in Sudan, he lived in the United Kingdom from 1967 onwards. In his burnished terracotta earthenware, he combined European and African influences. The Victoria and Albert Museum in London holds some of his works, with his ibreeq, a modern version of a traditional Sudanese coffee pot, presented online.

Hussein Shariffe (1934–2005), a painter, poet, filmmaker and lecturer at the Faculty of Arts of the University of Khartoum, was a Sudanese intellectual and artist, active from the late 1950s to the 1990s. After his studies of Modern History at the University of Cambridge in England, he took a master's degree at London's Slade School of Fine Arts, where he studied under Lucian Freud. Along with other works, his painting Angel Pregnant with Moon, was exhibited in London's Gallery One in 1960, and the National Portrait Gallery in London holds photographs by Shariffe sitting in front of his paintings. Shariffe is said to have painted more than 500 paintings, but only few of them have been documented.

Mo Abarro (1935–2016), born as Mohammed Ahmed Abdalla Abarro, was a sculptor known for his ceramic art. As other artists of his generation, he graduated from the College of Fine and Applied Arts in Khartoum and then studied ceramics at the Central School of Arts and Crafts in London. After his postgraduate studies in industrial pottery design, he returned to Sudan to teach ceramics for some years, but decided to return to England in 1966 to pursue his career in Britain. His work was described as both reflecting traditional Sudanese domes and arches, as well as the shapes of calabashes and basketry.

Kamala Ibrahim Ishaq (b. 1936), the first modern woman painter in the Sudan, studied painting at the College of Fine Arts of the Sudan University of Science and Technology in Khartoum and later at the Royal College of Art in London. Together with her students Muhammad Hamid Shaddad and Nayla El Tayib, she was a founder of the conceptual art group called the "Crystalists" that brought new directions to Sudanese art. According to the Sharjah Art Foundation, her work "challenges the traditional male perspective of art in Sudan, depicting scenes of women's lives in colours of sun, sand and sky."

Mohammad Omer Khalil (b. 1936) studied Fine Arts in Khartoum until 1959, and from 1963, painting and printmaking in Florence, Italy. Having worked and taught for several decades in the United States since 1967, he has used found objects, archival materials, textiles, or photographs, beside conventional paints. In his prints, he prefers different shades of black, as he explained on the occasion of his exhibition Homeland Under My Nails at London's Mosaic Rooms in 2020. Khalil has been called "one of the Arab world's most important contemporary painters, having influenced two generations of regional artists." In 2012, his work was presented in the retrospective exhibition at the Institut du Monde Arabe in Paris.

Amir Nour (1936–2021), a sculptor and academic, studied African art and sculpture at the University of St. Andrews, Scotland, the Royal College of Art, London, U.K. and the School of Art & Architecture of Yale University, United States. His sculptures, made of materials such as concrete, fibreglass or steel, are abstract and minimalist, but still citing animals, landscape, and architecture that relate to Sudan and the Afro-Islamic culture of his youth.

Omer Khairy (1939–1999) started studying art as his major subject in secondary school and from 1960, he continued at the College of Fine and Applied Arts. Due to mental health problems, he had to interrupt his studies. Nevertheless, he became known for his paintings in local exhibitions, that have since been presented in public collections. Sudanese filmmaker Alyaa Musa has been engaged in a documentary film project about this "mystery, even for those who surrounded his timid presence and his audacious artwork."

Hassan Musa (b.1951), who left Sudan for postgraduate studies in France in the 1970s, is known as painter, calligrapher, engraver and has illustrated numerous books. During the 1960s, he engaged in the popular genre of Mail art, also known as Post Art, associated with anti-establishment activity. His work 'The Martyrdom of Saint Sebastian' was included in the exhibition 'Modernities and Memories' at the 1997 Venice Biennale. For his adaptations of classical Western masterpieces, he is said to have created "a critical view on Western art, politics and culture."

Rashid Diab (born 1957) studied painting and art history first in Khartoum and continued his postgraduate studies at the Complutense University in Madrid, Spain. The works of his early period created in Spain have been described as abstract, strong images, reflecting the colours and texture of his native country. Upon his return to Sudan, he responded to the different ways of interpretation by his local audience and turned to more recognizable forms of expression, like women set "in absolute nothingness". Diab's works have been internationally exhibited, and some are presented online by the Hindiyeh Museum of Art in Jordan.

Salah El Mur (born 1966) is internationally known as painter, graphic designer, book author and filmmaker. His paintings show influences from tradition, folklore, different people and environments, and his use of colour shows bold tones in broad lines. He lives and works between Cairo and Khartoum and his paintings have been shown in exhibitions both in the Middle East, Europe and the United States. In 2018, his paintings were presented along with works by Kamala Ishaq and Ibrahim El-Salahi by Saatchi Gallery, London, in an exhibition called Forests and Spirits: figurative art from the Khartoum School.

Ahmed Abushariaa (b. 1966) graduated from the College of Fine and Applied Arts in 1990 and lived in Kenya in the mid-90s. He later briefly lived in Cologne, Germany, and since 2000, he has been living in Kampala, Uganda, where he continues to work and exhibit his paintings. His style is said to be influenced by the earlier contemporary artists in Sudan, including Ibrahim el Salahi and Rashid Diab.

Apart from the names already mentioned, other Sudanese artists of the 20th century in the Smithsonian Libraries reading list on Modern African Art are Musa Khalifa (born 1941), Mohamed Omer Bushara (born 1946), and Salih Abdou Mashamoun (born 1946).

=== The 21st century and the art of the revolution ===
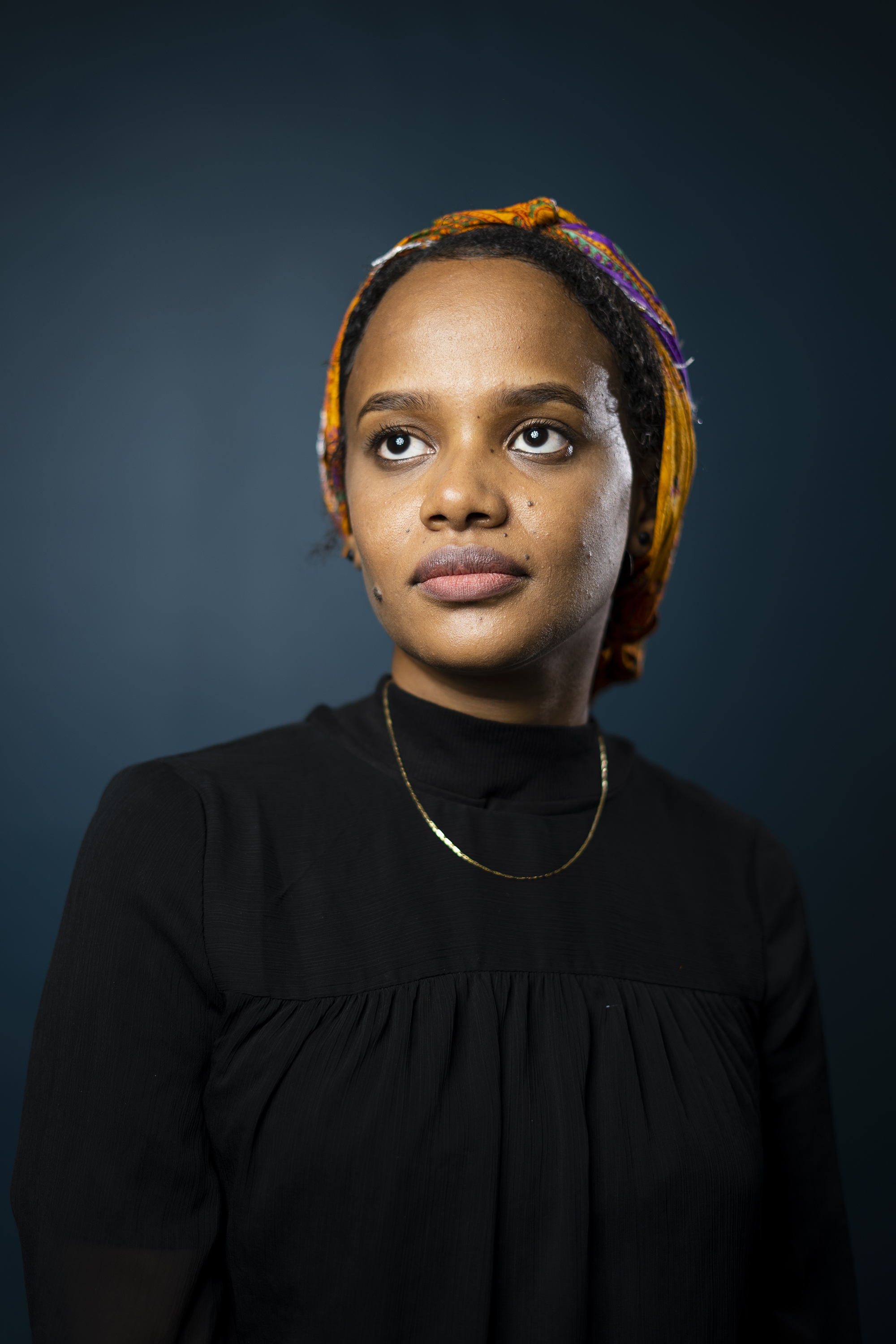
Sudanese painter Amna Elhassan, photo by Ala Kheir 2020

As Sudanese academic Ahmad Sikainga wrote in 2012, modern art movements in Sudan and their social background have not attracted much analysis by art historians. (Note: The Sudanese academic Ahmad Sikainga, who teaches at Ohio State University in the US, began his article "A short history of Sudanese popular music" with these words: "In the literature on the rise of modern Sudan, there is a dominance of political analysis and a comparative absence of social and cultural history. Topics such as popular culture, music, dance and clothing have received scant attention from historians. These subjects have mostly been left to anthropologist and others whose research has been in rural areas. Yet such activities are central to the emergence of a common popular culture in the urban centres of the country. This is a culture that springs from the lives of marginal groups, of manual workers, peasants, slaves and women, and from the merging of a great diversity of indigenous and external influences. Sikainga, Ahmad (2012), "A short history of Sudanese popular music", in Ryle, John; Willis, Justin; Baldo, Suliman; Madut Jok, Jok (eds.), The Sudan Handbook (digital ed.), London: Rift Valley Institute, p. 243, ISBN 9781847010308) During the Sudanese Revolution of 2018/19, however, the role of artists has been reported in international media, reflecting their interest in current events. Before and during the revolution, artists expressed their views on society and politics, even though this expression had been severely limited by the former government of Omar al Bashir. In November 2020, students of the College of Fine Arts at Sudan University of Science and Technology (SUSTEC) exhibited a memorial sculpture representing the slogans of the Revolution: Freedom, Peace And Justice. In April 2021, further art exhibitions took place in Khartoum to commemorate the revolution and protestors killed during the revolution.

Khalid Albaih, a political cartoonist and human rights activist, acquired fame through his Facebook page Khartoon! as well as his interviews in Middle Eastern and Western media. In 2019, he co-edited the illustrated book "Sudan retold". Using different artistic genres, such as graphic storytelling, watercolour painting or photography, a group of young artists told their versions of Sudanese history, present and future. Amna Elhassan, one of these young artists featured, has since embarked on an international career, with a solo exhibition in 2022 at the renowned Schirn art museum in Frankfurt, Germany. Referring both to the important role of women in the Sudanese Revolution as well as to the artistic works of women artists, their contributions have been highlighted in articles, exhibitions and public artistic performances.

=== Art galleries and patronage ===
In 2009, the article on Modern Art in Sudan stated that "artists in Khartoum have been severely hampered by the lack of exhibition space, and by the lack of patronage." It mentioned only one 'semi-public' art gallery in Khartoum, and the occasional exhibition at one of the bigger hotels. Rather, it gave credit to the "major role" played by the three foreign cultural centres of Great Britain, France and Germany. Besides these, private galleries had been opened by Sudanese artists Ahmad Muhammad Shibrain and Rashid Diab. Diab's art centre also was the place, where the work of Ibrahim El-Salahi, living in exile since 1978, was presented in 2000 to the Sudanese art world. Another gallery promoting Sudanese artists in Khartoum has been the Dabanga Gallery, whose owner Lina Haggar edited the book Contemporary artists of the Sudan: art in times of adversity in 2017. In 2016, Mojo Art Gallery was one of the few commercial art spaces presenting Sudanese art. Until 2022, a number of other art galleries such as Downtown Gallery were operating in Khartoum.

After having fled from Khartoum to Nairobi due to the war in Sudan, founder of Downtown Gallery Rahiem Shadad co-curated an exhibition of Sudanese artists titled Disturbance in the Nile in 2023. Presenting artworks by Rashid Diab, Reem Aljeally, Eltayeb Dawelbait, Waleed Mohammed, Yasmeen Abdullah and Bakri Moaz, it was shown first in Cologne, Germany, then in Lisbon, Portugal, and in March 2024 in Madrid, Spain. Since relocating to Nairobi, Shadad has focused on curating and mentoring artists in exile through initiatives such as The Rest Residency, which provided displaced Sudanese creatives with workspace, visibility, and networks across East Africa. In 2025, he co-curated the exhibition “Sudan Retold Edition 1½” in Doha, which expanded on the original Sudan Retold project linking art, literature, and national memory.

=== Comics and cartoons as popular art forms ===
Popular art forms such as cartoons and comics, published in print or online, also have found growing attention and respond to current events, such as the international COVID-19 pandemic. Since 2018, a festival for comics, called Khartoum Comic Con, has been organized as a showcase for Sudanese comic artists and their audience.

== Cinema and photography in Sudan ==
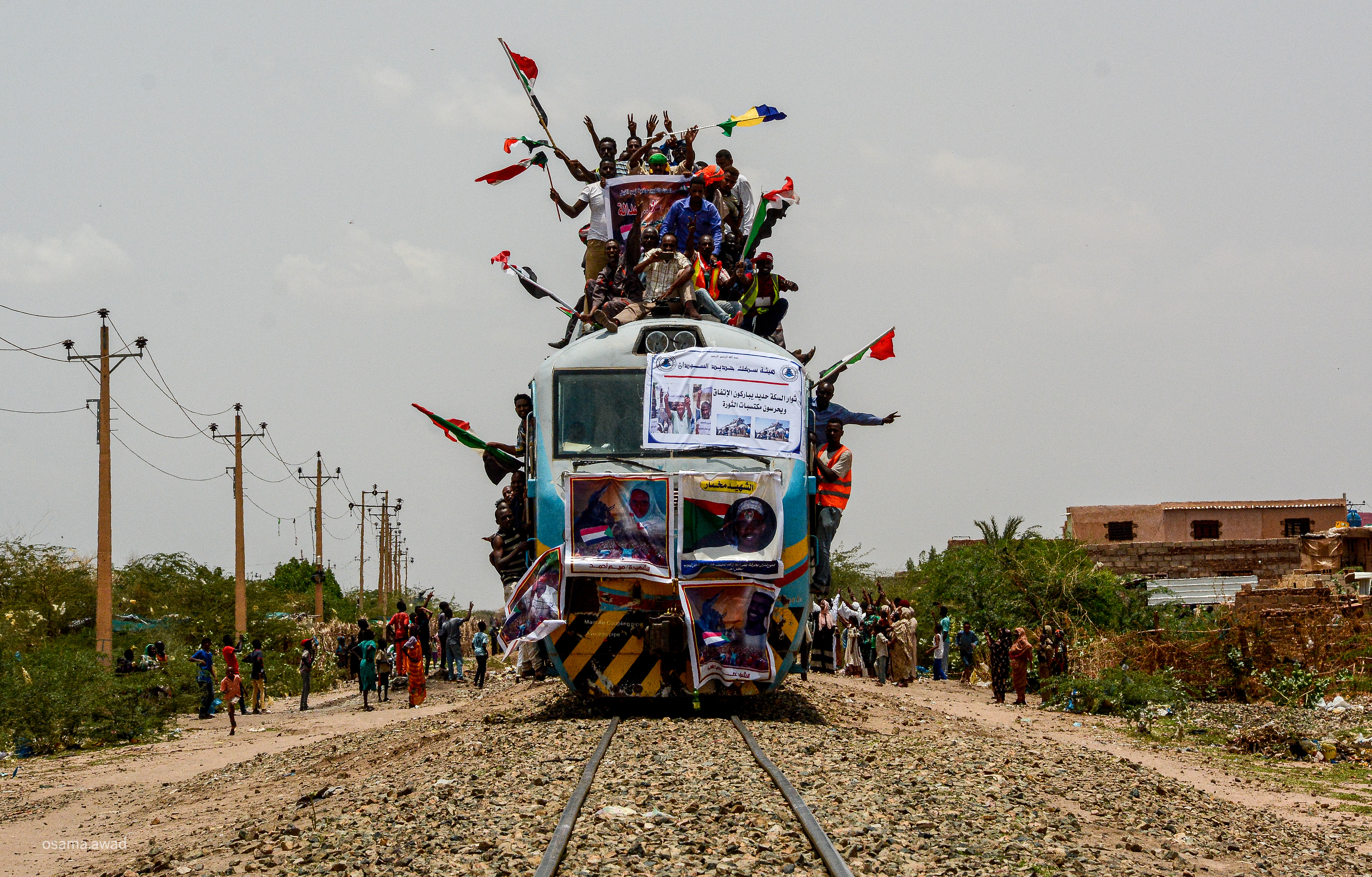
Documentary photograph showing supporters of the Sudanese Revolution, by Osama Elfaki, 2019

Foreign explorers and photographers have created drawings and photographs from the middle of the 19th century onwards. In the 20th century, photo stories about the Nuba people in the southern part of Sudan taken by photographers George Rodger and Leni Riefenstahl, as well as by photojournalists covering human crises have shaped the international image of the country. At the start of the 21st century, the introduction of digital photography initiated a wider photographic and artistic coverage by Sudanese photographers.

After film production and cinemas in Sudan started in British colonial times during the first half of the 20th century, Sudanese audiences in Khartoum and other cities had been exposed to documentary and feature films from abroad, and since the 1930s, there were a number of outdoor cinemas. After independence, few films were produced by the first generation of Sudanese filmmakers such as Gadalla Gubara or Hussein Shariffe. In 2019, the biographies of three Sudanese filmmakers of the 1960s were presented in the documentary film Talking About Trees, which also shares personal insights into the reasons for the decline of cinemas and filmmaking in Sudan.

== Impact of the 2023 war on artists ==
Following the outbreak of the 2023 war in Sudan, many artists suffered like other Sudanese in the most affected areas from destruction of their homes and studios, shortages in basic utilities, disruption of transport and financial services. During the following months, many Sudanese became homeless and had to leave Khartoum as well as major cities in Darfur, Wad Madani among others. BBC News reported on 27 December 2023 that artists and art promoters had fled to neighbouring capitals such as Cairo, Addis Abeba or Nairobi.

Already in July 2023, the Sudanese regional cultural organisation "The Muse multi studios" had conducted an enquiry to "understand the situation of artists in these circumstances in order to shed light on their social, familial, and financial conditions." The resulting report focused on 45 artists and art practitioners in conflict-affected areas, especially in Khartoum and neighbouring countries. Almost 60% of the artists still living in Sudan who responded were not able to continue their activities in their current place of residence, whereas some 40% of the artists outside Sudan considered working in their artistic field as their primary source of income. About 86% of the artists in Khartoum were planning to move to other countries, providing they could obtain a visa and sufficient financial means. The study concludes that under these circumstances, Sudanese artists need effective support from cultural institutions and networking. To this effect, The Muse started to publish their bilingual art magazine the muse in September 2023. Some of the artists presented in the first issue were painters Salah El Mur, Elhassan Elmountasser and Amna Elhassan as well as photographers Ala Kheir and Metche Ja'afar.

To support Sudanese artists in exile, art curator Rahiem Shaddad of Downtown Gallery, who has been active in promoting contemporary visual art since 2019, created a fund to support Sudanese artists. In 2024, he co-curated a group exhibition titled Disturbance in the Nile, including works by Rashid Diab, Mohammed A. Otaybi, Reem Aljealy and others for galleries in Lisbon, Portugal, and Madrid, Spain.

== See also ==
- History of Sudan
- Architecture of Sudan
- List of Sudanese artists
- List of Sudanese actors

== Bibliography ==
- Albaih, Khalid; et al. (2019). Sudan retold (in English, German, and Arabic). Berlin: Hirnkost. p. 248. ISBN 978-3945398906. Archived from the original on 6 May 2021.
- Ali, Wijdan (1997). Modern Islamic Art: Development and Continuity. Gainesville, FL: University Press of Florida. ISBN 9780813015262
- Brown, Marie Grace (2017). Khartoum at Night: Fashion and Body Politics in Imperial Sudan. Stanford, CA: Stanford University Press. ISBN 9781503602687.
- Daum, Werner and Rashid Diab (2009). Modern Art in Sudan In Hopkins, Peter G. (ed.) Kenana Handbook of Sudan. New York: Routledge, pp. 453–516 ISBN 0-7103-1160-5
- Ducommun, Janine Andrée and Hesham Elshazly (2009). Kerma and the royal cache.
- El Tayib, Griselda et al. (2017). Regional Folk Costumes of the Sudan. Kaufering: Sequenz Medien. ISBN 9783940190963, 3940190969
- European Commission – CORDIS (23 October 2020). "Archaeology of textile production in the kingdom of Meroe: New approaches to cultural identity and economics in ancient Sudan and Nubia". cordis.europa.eu/.
- Friedel, Julia (3 May 2017). "Exhibition Histories – Seven stories about modern art in Africa". contemporaryand.com.
- Haggar, Lina and Tarneem Saeed. Contemporary artists of the Sudan: art in times of adversity / edited by Victor Röhm; photographer Issam Hafiez. Khartoum, Sudan: Dabanga Art & Crafts, 2015. 141 pp. with colour illustr. OCLC 961267194
- Haggar, Lina; Elamin, Mohammed Osman (2020). تسقط The Art of Revolution (in Arabic and English). Khartoum: Dabanga Art & Crafts. ISBN 978-99942-76-72-1.
- Hassan, Salah (ed.) (2012). Ibrahim El-Salahi – A Visionary Modernist, Museum for African Art, New York ISBN 9781849762267, 1849762260, exhibition catalogue online
- Hassan, Salah M.; Enwezor, Okwui (1995). New Visions: Recent Works by Six African Artists: Rashid Diab, Angèle Etoundi Essamba, David Koloane, Wosene Kosrof, Houria Niati, Olu Oguibe. Eatonville: Zora Neale Hurston National Museum of Fine Arts. p. 11.
- Kadoda, Gada (28 March 2022). Sudanese Intellectuals in the Global Milieu: Capturing Cultural Capital. Rowman & Littlefield. ISBN 978-1-7936-2277-8.
- Kennedy, Jean. "Desert light: Sudan," pp. 108–122. In New currents, ancient rivers: contemporary African artists in a generation of change. Washington, DC: Smithsonian Institution Press, 1992.
- Muhammad, Baqie Badawi, "Arts: Visual Arts and Artists: Sudan", in: Encyclopedia of Women & Islamic Cultures, General Editor Suad Joseph.
- Porter, Venetia. Word into Art: Artists of the Modern Middle East. British Museum Press, 2006 ISBN 9780714111643
- Sharkey, Heather J. (2003) Living with Colonialism: Nationalism and Culture in the Anglo-Egyptian Sudan. Berkeley and Los Angeles, University of California Press. ISBN 0520929365, 9780520929364
- "Sudan, Democratic Republic of the." In The Grove encyclopedia of Islamic art and architecture. Eds. Jonathan M. Bloom, Sheila S. Blair. Oxford Islamic Studies Online. ISBN 9780195309911, 9780195373042
