= Amna Elhassan =

Sudanese visual artist (born 1988)

- آمنة الحسن
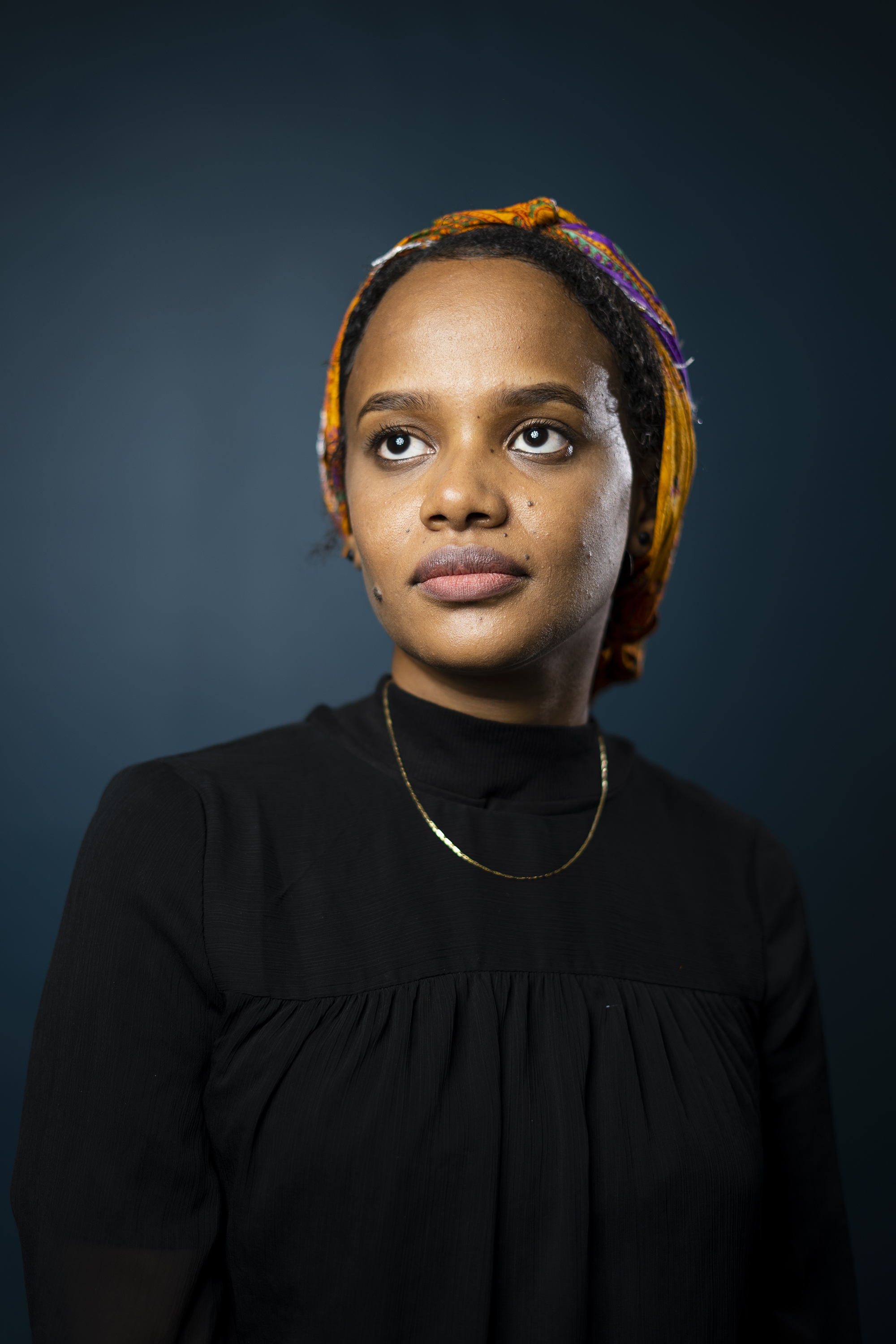
- Amna Elhassan by Ala Kheir, 2022
- Born: 1988 (age 36–37); Khartoum, Sudan
- Education: University of Khartoum; Sapienza University of Rome, Italy
- Known for: Painter
- Movement: contemporary art
- Website: https://www.amnaelhassan.com/

Amna Elhassan (Arabic: آمنة الحسن, born 1988 in Khartoum, Sudan) is a Sudanese visual artist and trained architect, who lives and works in Khartoum. Her artistic work is often focused on the perception of Sudanese women in public and private life, expressed in a variety of media, including printmaking and painting.

== Life and work experience ==
In 2010, Elhassan obtained a Bachelor's degree in architecture from the University of Khartoum, followed in 2013 by a master's degree in architectural design at the Sapienza University in Rome, Italy. After her return to Sudan, she dedicated herself to fine arts and painting, working with her mentor, Sudanese artist Hatim Koko, at the Khartoum Arts Training Centre. Her first exhibitions were shown in Khartoum at Rashid Diab Arts Center and the National Museum of Sudan, among others, from 2016 onwards. Further, she has shown her work at several international exhibitions, and in July 2022 was invited as a guest lecturer at the University of Fine Arts of Hamburg, Germany, teaching a class titled “Art During Times Of Crisis”. Her work was also featured in the 2019 art book Sudan retold as part of a group of young artists telling their artistic versions of Sudanese history, present and future.

According to The Economist, writing about the latest exhibition in London's Serpentine Gallery of Sudanese senior painter and art teacher Kamala Ibrahim Ishaq, Elhassan is a prominent Sudanese artist, painting oneiric figures influenced by Ishaq's Crystallist Group movement.

=== Solo exhibition in Frankfurt ===
On show from November 2022 until February 2023, the Schirn art museum in Frankfurt/Main, Germany, announced a solo exhibition by Elhassan titled Deconstructed Bodies – in Search of Home. Conceived especially for the rotunda of the internationally renowned art museum, her large-format mural titled "December" is meant as a monument to the victims of the Sudanese Revolution that started in December 2018 and was largely supported by Sudanese women. Apart from her large mural, the exhibition presents 21 paintings and prints that Elhassan has produced since 2019, showing scenes of everyday life as well as portraits of Sudanese women. At the same time, Elhassan's artworks and accompanying texts were published as a first overview on her work in an art historical publication.

In a review Frankfurter Allgemeine Zeitung wrote "Her experimental paintings and prints, created in different analogue and digital techniques and for which she uses oil, acrylic and spray paint in layers on paper and canvas, address the change and resistance of Sudanese women." According to Sebastian Baden, the director of the Schirn art museum, Elhassan is "an important voice of artistic self-empowerment in Sudan." Further, he added: "With her site-specific panorama painting in the rotunda of the Schirn, Elhassan sets a sign of courage and commitment to a vibrant democracy. The artist has dedicated a forward-looking artistic memorial to the victims of the Khartoum massacre."

Commenting on Elhassan's working method with Sudanese graffiti and the political message of the mural "December", curator Larissa-Diana Fuhrmann called the exhibition "a direct connection between the protests on the Sudanese street with the museum space" in Frankfurt.

== Group and solo exhibitions ==
- Rashid Diab Arts Center, Khartoum, 2017
- National Museum of Sudan, Khartoum, 2016
- Journées d'Art Contemporain de Carthage JACC, Tunis, 2019
- Afriart Gallery in Kampala, Uganda, 2020
- Egypt International Art Fair, Cairo, Egypt, 2021
- University of Fine Arts, Hamburg, Germany, 2022
- Schirn art museum in Frankfurt/Main, Germany, 2022/2023

== See also ==
- Visual arts of Sudan - The 21st century and the art of the revolution
- Sudanese revolution - Popular art and slogans
- Soudan 2019, année zéro
- Reem Aljeally
