= Omer Khairy =

Sudanese artist (1939–1999)

- عمر خيري
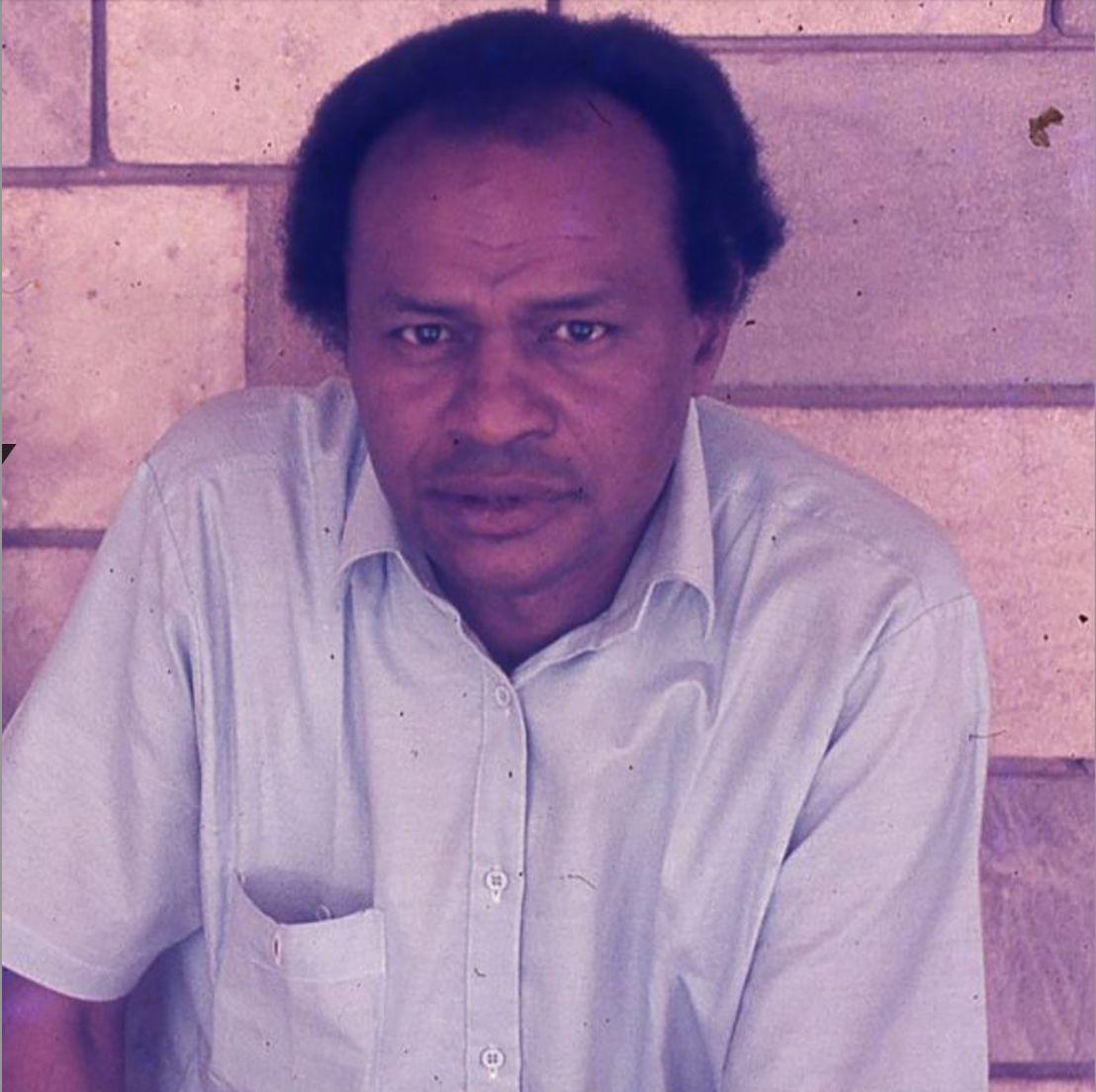
- Born: 1939; Omdurman, Sudan
- Died: 12 April 1999 (aged 60); Sudan
- Other name: George Edward Scuncucur
- Education: College of Fine and Applied Art (Khartoum)
- Occupation: visual artist
- Years active: 1960–1990

Omer Khairy (1939–1999; Arabic: عمر خيري; also known as George Edward Scuncucur) was a Sudanese artist and modern painter.

== Life and career ==
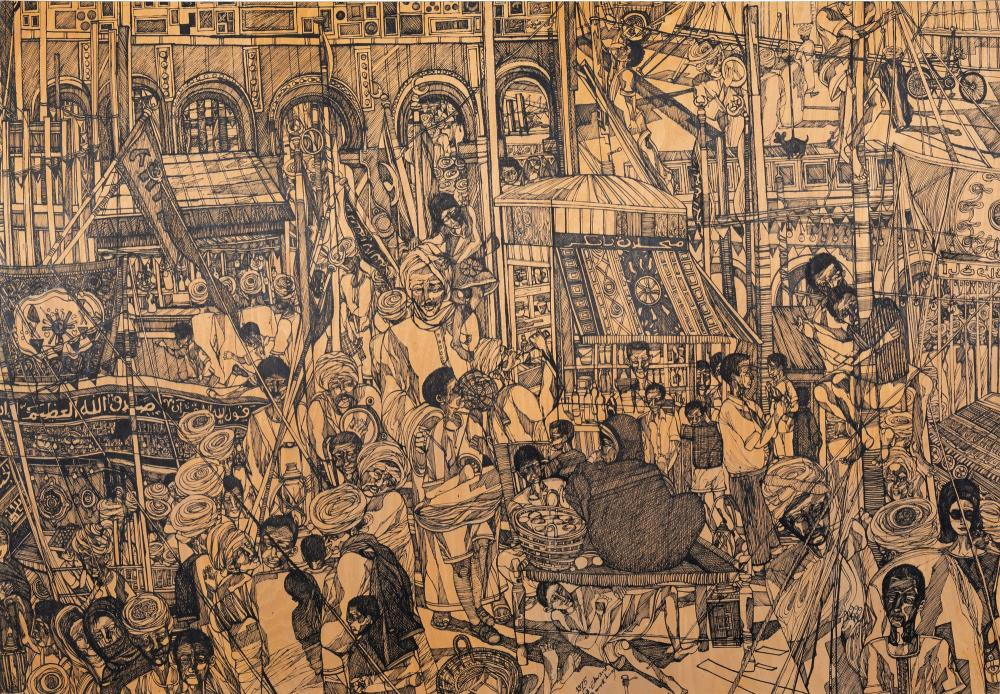
Omer Khairy, Untitled (Market Scene), 1975

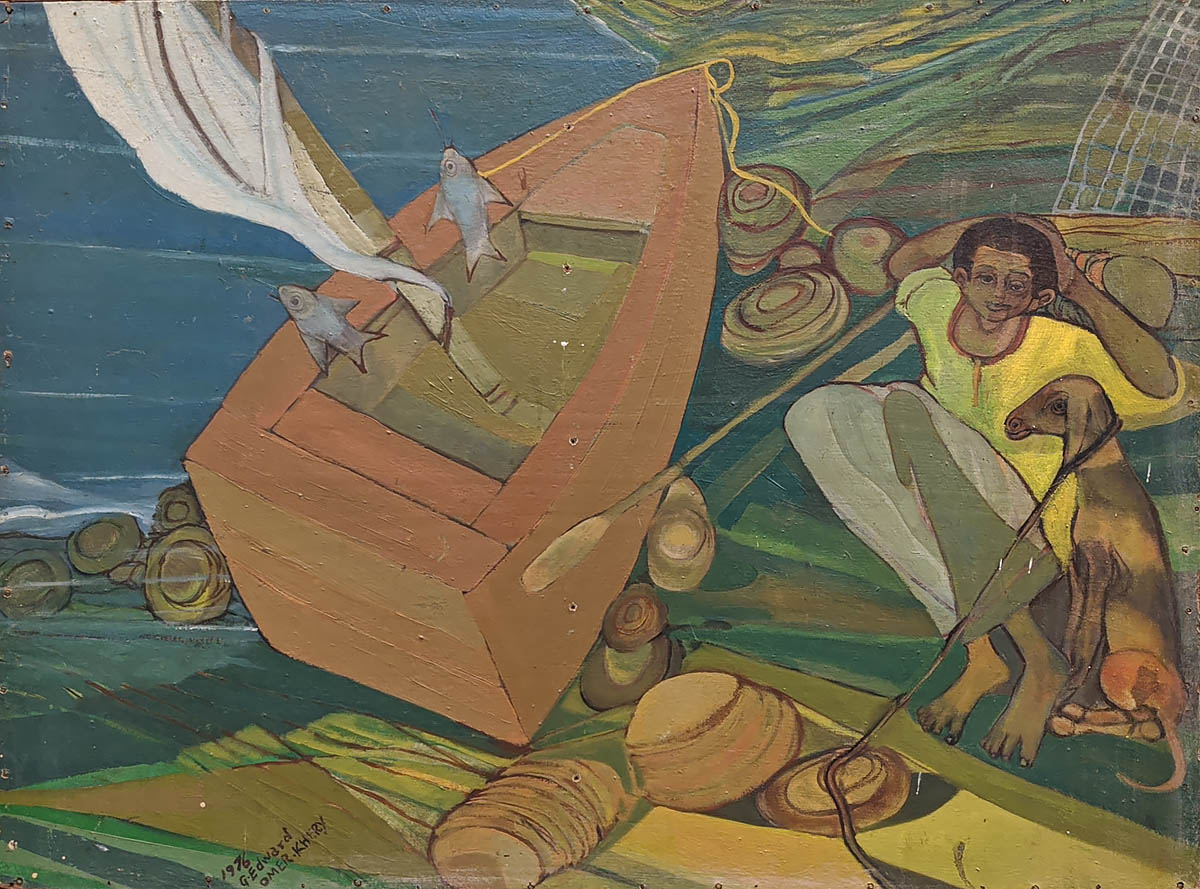
Omer Khairy, The Fisherman (1976), Barjeel Art Foundation

Khairy was born in Omdurman, Sudan, in 1939. He was the last of seven children born to Abdallah Khairy and Fatima Al Hajj Mohamed, who lived in the Abasseya neighbourhood in Omdurman. He went to school at the Abbasiya Elementary School in 1947, where he was first introduced to art, learning to draw, etch, and produce works in clay. Inspired by his elder brother Abdul Aziz, who was an artist, he became interested in drawing, and focused particularly on portraits and animals, which he included in his animated scenes of the Sudanese city. He studied art at the Secondary School in Khartoum Polytechnic in 1957 and later trained at the College of Fine and Applied Arts in Khartoum, where he focused on drawing.

Having lost his father at a young age, Khairy was especially close to his mother. In 1963, following his mother's death, he suffered a nervous breakdown and travelled to Cairo, Egypt, for psychiatric treatment. Upon his return to Sudan, he wrote The Scuncucur Biography (1972) which told the life story of an imaginary Englishman that he referred to as George Edward Scuncucur. From this point on, he began to sign his works interchangeably as Omer Khairy and George Edward Scuncucur, and likely thought of himself as both people.

== Reception ==
From 4 May to 4 August 2024, Sharjah Art Foundation presented a group exhibition of drawings by 15 artists, titled Drawing Time: Duets, including drawings, letters, envelopes and sketches by Khairy. A common trait of the works was the notion of "the double, the pair, the rejoinder", reflected in Khairy's double identity. Other works by notable Sudanese artists in this show were drawings by Ibrahim El-Salahi and Kamala Ibrahim Ishag.

Works by Khairy have been collected by the Barjeel Art Foundation in the United Arab Emirates, the Sharjah Art Foundation, the Tigani Omar El Khatib Collection, the Khayat Private Collection, among others.

== See also ==
- Visual arts of Sudan – 20th-century modern art

== Literature ==
- Drawing time:Duets (Exhibition guide). Sharjah Art Foundation. 2024. ISBN 978-1-915656-15-5.
