= Khalid Albaih =

Sudanese political cartoonist

Khalid Albaih خالد ود البيه
- Born: April 22, 1980 (age 45); Bucharest, Romania
- Known for: Political cartoons, Graphic arts, Human Rights Activism
- Awards: Fellow at the Oak Institute for the Study of International Human Rights, Colby Center for the Arts and Humanities and other awards
- Website: Khartoon! by KhalidAlbaih

Khalid Albaih or Khalid Wad Albaih (Arabic: خالد ود البيه; born 22 April 1980) is a Sudanese political cartoonist, civil rights activist and freelance journalist, who grew up as member of the Sudanese diaspora in Doha, Qatar. He has published his social and political caricatures and articles mainly in Arab and international online media, and his graphic art has also been publicly exhibited internationally.

== Life and artistic career ==
The son of a former Sudanese diplomat, Albaih grew up outside of his home country. Apart from his freelance work as political cartoonist and activist, he was employed as Head of Installation and Design by the Qatar Museum Authority. Since 2017, he has been living in Copenhagen, Denmark, where he has been invited by the International Cities of Refuge Network (ICORN) programme as a city artist.

Albaih publishes his written or graphic social and political commentary in newspapers or magazines like Al Jazeera, The Guardian or The Atlantic, and his cartoons on his social media pages under the name “Khartoon!,” a word play on cartoon and Khartoum, the capital of Sudan.

In September 2016, when he was a human rights fellow at Colby College in Maine, United States, Albaih created a cartoon of American football player and civil rights activist Colin Kaepernick, kneeling with his Afro hairstyle in the shape of a black fist, that quickly went viral. With this widely shared cartoon, Albaih wanted to evoke the historic images of other African-American athletes who took a firm position on civil liberties. Also in 2016, Albaih and ten other visual artists from the Middle East took a road trip across parts of the United States, exploring and commenting on US civil rights and relations with the citizens of other countries.

In 2019, and in cooperation with the German Cultural Centre in Khartoum, Albaih co-edited an illustrated book, called Sudan Retold. This art book presents artistic renderings of the history of Sudan by 30 different young Sudanese artists, including graphic stories about the country's colonial history, cartoons about its diverse languages or changing ideals of feminine beauty in Sudan. In 2019, he was awarded the Freedom Artists Residency by Artists at Risk Connection (ARC) in New York City.

Albaih's cartoons have been publicly exhibited in group and individual exhibitions in Gulf countries, Europe, and the United States. In 2020, Albaih's work and activism were presented as a virtual exhibition on Google Arts & Culture.

== Activism for civil rights and freelance journalism ==
As activist for universal civil rights, Albaih not only comments on political events in his home country Sudan, but also has published cartoons and given talks about other current events, like the popular uprisings known as the Arab Spring or the fate of refugees of the Syrian Civil War, exemplified in his cartoon on the death of Alan Kurdi.

On Al Jazeera online from Qatar Albaih made a personal statement about the continuing dangers of a counter-revolution against the Sudanese revolution of 2018/19, as he wrote "that replacing old dictators with younger ones will not solve the region's problems."

In the British newspaper The Guardian, he declared: "Coming from Sudan, a country that is both located in Africa and part of the Middle East, I carry the baggage of one of the most “complicated” areas in the world. That's according to the western narrative – as if the West were not one of the main complicating factors in the region.

Stressing the importance of Sudanese citizens living abroad for political changes at home, he was quoted in Harper's Bazaar Arabia: "This is a very important time for the Sudanese diaspora to stand up for those fighting for freedom and hope back home. Now is the time for the international community to amplify the voices of those fighting for their freedom on the ground.”

Another of Albaih's aims is supporting social networks for artists living in countries with restrictions of artistic expression and lacking public recognition. With this aim in mind, he participated in the independently organized arts festival in the Sudanese village of Karmakol, the birthplace of the prominent Sudanese writer Tayeb Salih in December 2017. Another of his projects for networking is FADAA, a non-for-profit online platform, that aims to offer meaningful connections between art patrons and artists.

In February 2021, the Sudanese cultural magazine Andariya published an article about the cartoons and personal comments of Albaih on the COVID-19 pandemic in Sudan. At the 2022 art exhibition documenta fifteen in Germany, Albaih participated with The Walls Have Ears, his sound installation of stories about asylum seekers in Denmark.

== Major exhibitions and awards ==
- Africans and Hague Justice, selection of African cartoons that reflect on the International Criminal Court, The Hague, 2014
- It’s Not Funny: Political Cartoons by Khalid Albaih, The Arab American Museum, Dearborn, MI, 2015
- #Khartoon! - @khalidalbaih at Harvard, The Center for Middle Eastern Studies, Harvard University, 2016
- do it بالعربي, Group Exhibition organized by the Sharjah Art Foundation, Sharjah, UAE, 2016
- Project Atrium: Khalid Albaih, Museum of Contemporary Art in Jacksonville, 2019
- Oak Fellow at the Oak Institute for the Study of International Human Rights, Colby Center for the Arts and Humanities, 2016
- City artist of the International Cities of Refuge Network (ICORN) programme, Copenhagen, Denmark, 2017
- Soros Arts Fellowship, 2018
- Freedom Artists Residency by Artists at Risk Connection (ARC), New York City, United States, 2019
- Stumbling is Not Falling, ArtX cultural platform, Manhattan, New York City, 2019
- The Walls Have Ears, documenta fifteen, Kassel, Germany

== See also ==
- Visual arts of Sudan
