= Ala Kheir =

Sudanese photographer, born 1985

- Born: 1 April 1985 (age 41); Nyala, Sudan
- Occupations: Documentary photography, street photography, motion picture photography
- Movement: African photography
- Awards: 2010s-present
- Website: Ala Kheir official website

Ala Kheir (Arabic: علاء خير, born 1 April 1985) is a Sudanese photographer, cinematographer and mechanical engineer. He became known as one of the founders of the Sudanese Photographers Group in Khartoum in 2009 and through international exhibitions of his photographs, as well as for networking and training for photographers in Africa.

== Biography and career ==
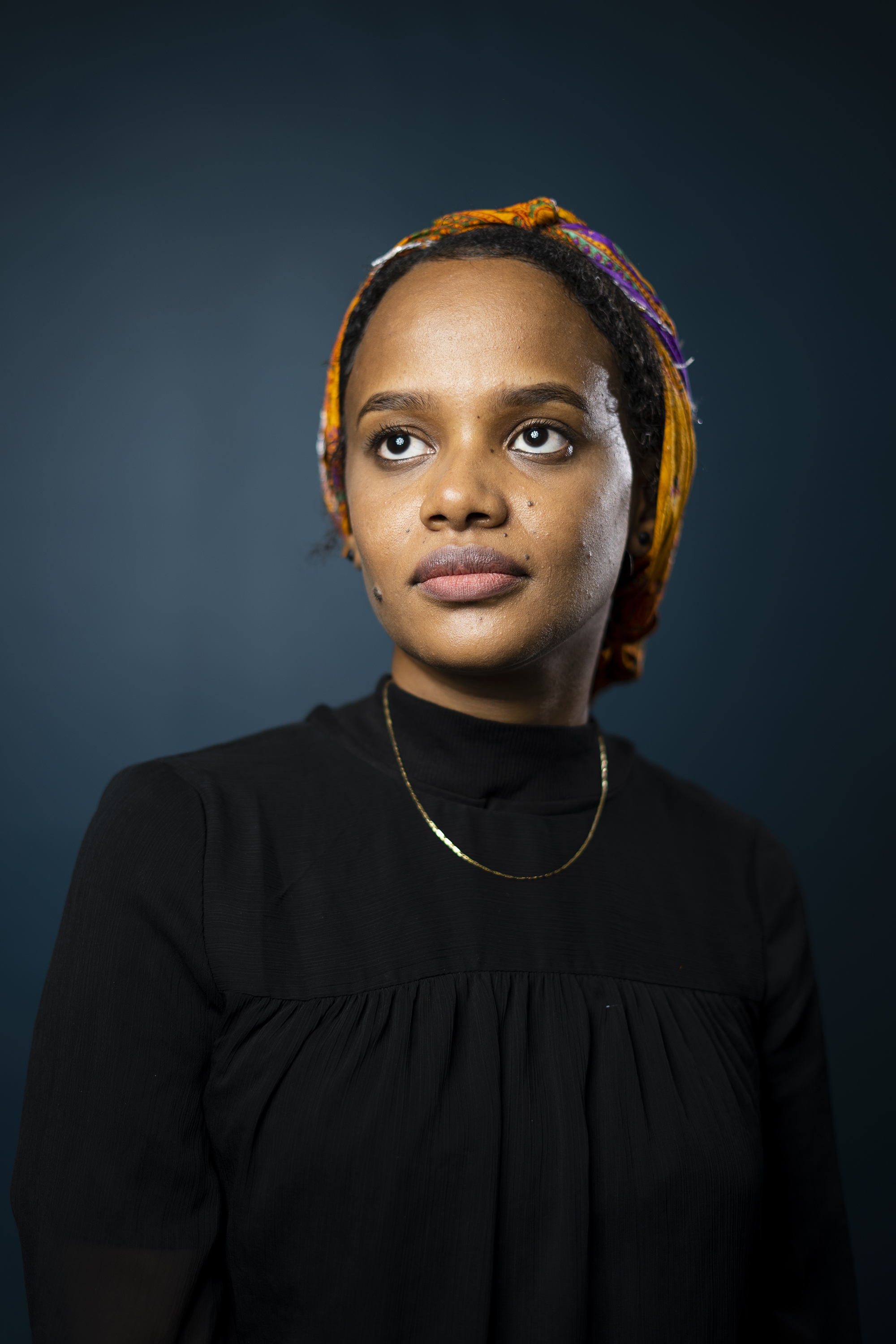
Portrait of Sudanese visual artist Amna Elhassan by Kheir, 2020

=== Early life and education ===
Kheir was born in Nyala, South Darfur, and moved to the capital Khartoum with his parents as a child. During summer holidays, he spent frequent visits in Nyala and as a photographer, he later took pictures of people's lives in the Marrah Mountains region.

Kheir studied mechanical engineering in Malaysia and started as a self-taught photographer. Upon his return to Sudan, he and other photographers in Khartoum established the Sudanese Photographers Group. This group started taking photographs and teaching photography as a visual art form, including other aspiring photographers into their workshops and exhibitions.

=== Photography ===
Kheir has been involved in networking and training for photographers in Africa, notably with the 'Centers of Learning for Photography in Africa' in Johannesburg, South Africa. This network brings together African platforms active in photography education, where the members "exchange ideas and teaching methodologies and also learn as trainers."

An example of such training and networking were a series of workshops and photo exhibitions in Khartoum between 2014 and 2016, titled 'Mugran Foto Week'. The exhibition of 2016 presented the collective results of a workshop called Modern Times, conducted the year before by photographers Michelle Lukidis from South Africa and André Lützen from Germany. In 2024, Lützen published his own photographs in the photobook Khartoum – A Tale of Three Cities.

While engaged in an online conversation in October 2022 with Durham University Library Special Collections and the Photography Legacy Project (PLP), Kheir was arrested and harassed by Sudanese security police, presumably because he was suspected to be involved in citizens' protests.

In April 2024, the news magazine The Continent reported how Kheir and his family were affected by the 2018 revolution and the 2023 war in Sudan. At the beginning of the revolution, he had moved his family from Khartoum to Cairo. Then, he went back to Sudan to photograph the anti-government movement in Khartoum and other cities. Further, he travelled to Darfur, the western region of Sudan his parents had come from, in order to research and document how people there had survived decades of conflict. After the outbreak of the war between the opposing military groups, food, water and electricity became scarce, and Kheir found himself threatened by soldiers who looked “more terrifying than the dead bodies” in the streets of the Khartoum region. Having survived a few weeks at his parents' place in Omdurman, he travelled on to Wad Madani, the capital of the Al Jazirah state. Many people having sought refuge in that city, Kheir found himself in the position of a war photographer. Finally, he had to flee from Sudan to the United Arab Emirates, only able to communicate through the internet with his parents who stayed behind in Sudan, or with his wife and children in Egypt that had effectively closed its borders to more Sudanese refugees.

In the magazine article "Street Photography: A Glimpse into Khartoum Architecture and Urban Design", Kheir reflected on the nature of street photography as he knew it before the war:

As a photographer, street photography has its unique joy, and the streets are the best place to link the human to the surrounding space resulting in an environmental portrait that tells the complete story. It is definitely a strong means to educate the public about our immediate environment.

— Ala Kheir, Sudanese photographer

=== Cinematography ===
Kheir participated as cinematographer and sound engineer for the short film Nothing Happens after your Absence by Sudanese filmmaker Ibrahim Omar. The film won the Jury Prize at the International Short Film Festival Oberhausen and the Golden Tanit at Carthage Film Festival and was shown during the 2026 Cannes Film Festival at the Quinzaine des Cinéastes section.

=== Group and individual exhibitions ===
- Reframing Neglect, Milan, New York and Abu Dhabi, Italy, USA and United Arab Emirates 2022/2023
- Revisiting Khartoum, African Capitals, France 2017
- Revisiting Khartoum, Dakar Biennale, Senegal 2016
- Khartoum 2 Addis, Venice Biennale, Italy 2015
- Africa, Big change, Big chance, Milan, Italy 2014
- Invisible Borders, group exhibition, Addis Photo Festival, Ethiopia 2012
- Khartoum (solo exhibition), Addis Photo Festival 2012
- The Un-governables, group exhibition in New York 2012
- Feel the color, Khartoum, 2009 (co-exhibition with Dia Khalil)
- 50+1, Malaysia, Kuala Lumpur 2007

== Awards ==
- Our Continent, Our Future photo competition, 2nd prize, 2013
- Connect for Climate photo competition, 2nd prize, 2012
- UN education photograph, 2010

== Reception ==
Kheir's photographs have been published by media including The Guardian, Brownbook magazine in Dubai, and the World Architecture Community. In 2020, his work was featured among 17 contemporary African photographers in the book The Journey. New Positions in African Photography. From 2008 to 2018, these African photographers had been invited by local German cultural centres of the Goethe-Institut to attend masterclasses, curated by Simon Njami and established African photographers such as Akinbode Akinbiyi. In the French book on 52 contemporary African artists Oh! AfricArt, Kheir and his photographs were featured as the only artist from Sudan.

For several years, Kheir served as a judge on the panel for the international Contemporary African Photography Prize (CAP) in Basel, Switzerland, "awarded annually to five photographers, whose works were created on the African continent, or which engage with the African diaspora." For their 2022 and 2025 contest, World Press Photo nominated Kheir as jury member for Africa.

During the 2023 Sudan conflict, The Guardian published a feature article in their series "My best Shot" on one of Kheir's pictures of Khartoum and his personal approach to photography. In the 2023 group exhibition Reframing Neglect in New York, Kheir was represented with pictures of people living on the outskirts of Khartoum and suffering from "neglected tropical diseases," which include leprosy, sleeping sickness and river blindness.

In 2024, Kheir's photograph titled "In Their Place", composed of layers of places and displaced people in war-affected Khartoum, was featured at the Africa Foto Fair and The Guardian's Art and Design gallery.

== See also ==
- Photography in Sudan
- Cinema of Sudan
