= Kamala Ibrahim Ishaq =

Sudanese painter (born 1937)

- كمالا إبراهيم اسحق
- Born: 1939 (age 86–87); Omdurman, Sudan
- Education: College of Fine and Applied Art, Sudan University of Science and Technology,
- Alma mater: Royal College of Art, London
- Known for: Painter
- Style: Contemporary Art
- Movement: African Modernism, Crystalist Movement

Kamala Ibrahim Ishaq (Arabic: كمالا إبراهيم اسحق, born 1939) is a Sudanese painter and art teacher, known as one of the founders of The Crystalist conceptual art group in Khartoum. This group rejected common conventions in Sudanese modern painting of the 1960s and strived to find "an aesthetic and critical language that would emphasise the notions of pleasure and knowledge in order to permanently abolish differences and boundaries". Based on her artistic career spanning more than fifty years, Ishaq has been called one of the most important visual artists in Africa.

== Biography ==
Ishaq was born in Omdurman and studied from 1959 to 1963 at the College of Fine and Applied Art of the Khartoum Technical Institute that later became the Sudan University of Science and Technology (SUST) in Khartoum. Further to this, she pursued her postgraduate studies in painting, illustration and lithography at the Royal College of Art in London between 1964 and 1969. After her stay in London, she returned to teach at her former college and also became dean of this art school.

== Artistic career ==
=== Influences and contributions ===
Ishaq's artistic and spiritual influences go back to the works of William Blake and the Zār spiritual rituals of Sudanese women. These themes of existentialism and the culture of women served as central themes of Ishaq's work in the 1970s and 1980s. These influences distinguished Ishaq from her compatriots, who were inspired largely by notions of Sudan's post-colonial independence and Islamic themes. If Blake and Zar provided personal inspiration, it was as member of the Khartoum School of painting where Ishaq began to be known as an artist. The goal of that movement was a combination of African and Islamic cultural traditions with Modernism. The Khartoum School's transcultural blending presented a new sense of Sudanese identity, expressed in abstract forms, earthy colors and Arabic calligraphy. Along Ibrahim El-Salahi, Ishaq is considered to be one of Africa's most prominent painters, and her focus on women's lives has been called a challenge to the traditional male perspective in Sudanese art.

=== The Crystalist Movement ===
In 1978 Ishaq and two of her students, Muhammad Hamid Shaddad and Nayla El Tayib, started the conceptual art movement called Crystalist Group that broke away from traditional practices in the Sudanese art scene. Their intention was to distinguish themselves from the Khartoum School of painting and their traditional male-centred outlook. This new approach in Sudanese painting was marked by a public declaration in the form of the so-called Crystalist Manifesto. First published in Arabic as Al-Bayan al-Kristali, the document presented an artistic vision that attempted to work beyond the Sudanese-Islamic framework of the Khartoum School. Moreover, the Crystalists sought to internationalize their art by embracing an existentialist avant-garde, more akin to European aesthetics.

The Cosmos is a project of a transparent crystal with no veil and eternal depth. The truth is that the Crystalists’ perception of time and space is different from that of others. The goal of the Crystalists is to bring back to life the language of the crystal and to transform language into something more transparent, in which no word can veil another – no selectivity in language. […] We are living a new life, and this life needs a new language and new poetry.

— The Crystalist Group, Khartoum, 1971

Aesthetically, the Crystalist manifesto understood the cosmos as a "project of a transparent crystal with no veils, but an eternal depth". Crystalist paintings often contain distorted human faces, trapped within clear cubes or spheres, and, as stated in their manifesto, "oppose[d] the trend which calls for skill and craftsmanship as a measure of good work." Inherent in the notions of the Crystalists was the feminist notion of unveiling — a significant facet amid the increasing Islamization of postcolonial Sudan. Further, they rejected the Hurufiyya movement that used Arabic calligraphy in artworks, positing that letters do not lead to great works of art.

== Collections ==
Her works are present in private and public collections, such as the Sharjah Art Foundation and the Barjeel Art Foundation in Sharjah, UAE.

== Exhibitions ==
Along with other African artists, Ishaq's paintings have been shown at Saatchi Gallery in London in the exhibition titled Forests and Spirits: Figurative Art from the Khartoum School from September to November 2018, and one of her works from this exhibition was sold by auction house Sotheby's in London in 2020. In October 2022, Serpentine South Gallery in London opened a retrospective exhibition covering works since her early years until the present.

Major exhibitions include:

- Camden Arts Centre, London, 1970
- National Museum of Women in Art, Washington, DC, 1994
- Sharjah Art Museum, UAE, 1995
- Whitechapel Gallery, London, 1995
- Breaking the veils: Women artists from the Islamic world, Royal Society of Fine Arts, Jordan, 2002
- Shibrain Art Centre, Khartoum, 2014
- Institut français, Khartoum, 2015
- Women in Crystal Cubes, Sharjah Art Foundation, 2016
- Serpentine South Gallery, London, 2022–23

== See also ==
- Visual arts of Sudan
- Reem Aljeally
- Amna Elhassan
