= Rashid Diab =

Sudanese painter and art historian (born 1957)

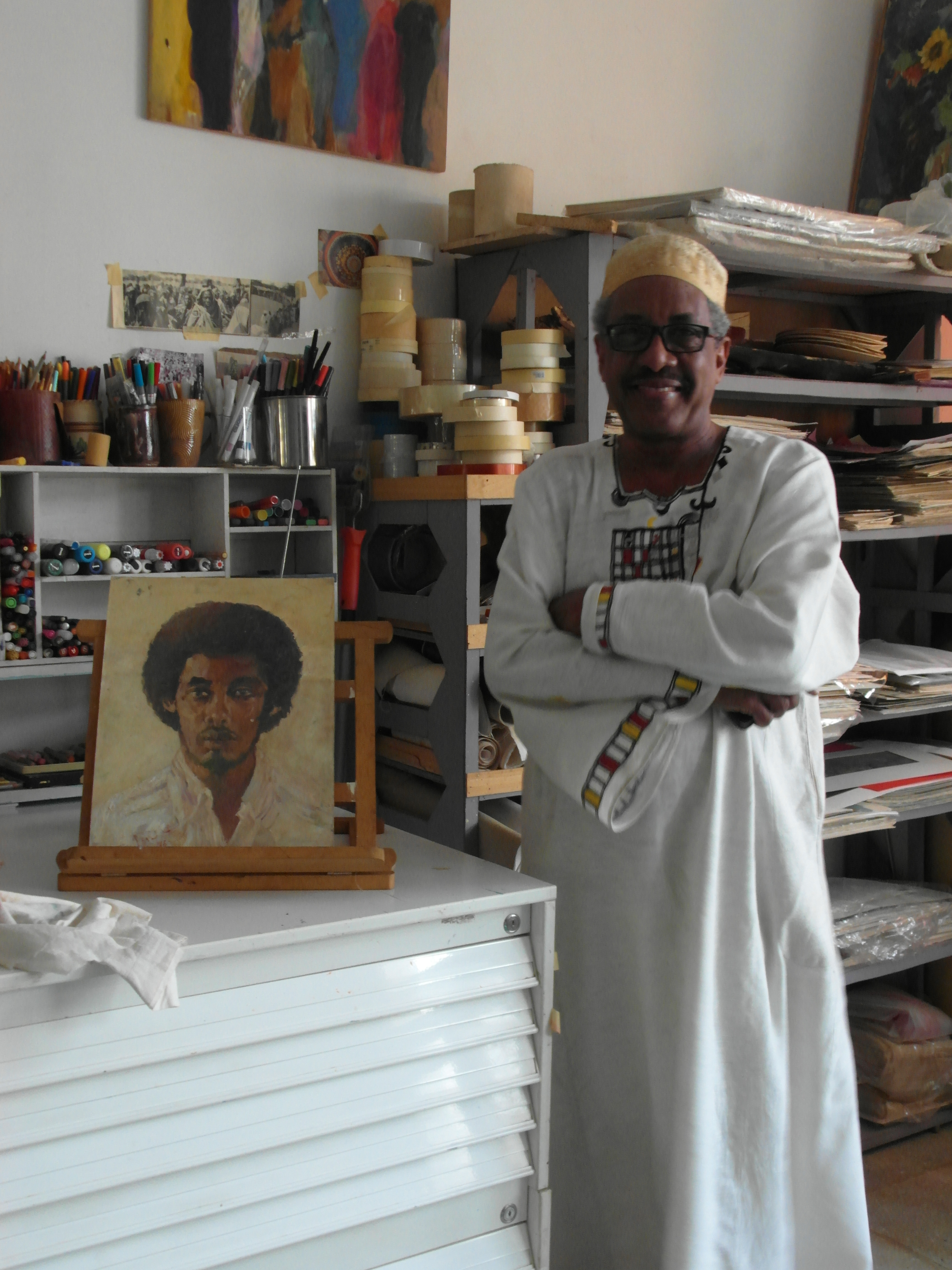
- Rashid Diab next to an early self-portrait in his Khartoum studio in 2015
- Born: 1957 (age 68–69); Wad Madani, Sudan
- Education: College of Fine and Applied Art (BA, 1978); Complutense University of Madrid (PhD, 1991)
- Style: Contemporary visual art
- Website: rashiddiab.com

Rashid Diab (Arabic: راشد دياب, Wad Madani, Sudan, 1957) is a Sudanese modern painter, visual artist and art historian. Having obtained his first academic degree in Sudan, he earned further academic degrees in visual arts and art history at the Complutense University of Madrid, Spain, and became a lecturer at the same university.

After his return to Sudan, he founded his Dara Art Gallery and Rashid Diab Cultural Centre, where he organized numerous exhibitions and workshops. Due to the outbreak of the war in Sudan in April 2023, he was forced to abandon his home and personal collection and to return to Madrid.

His participation in major art exhibitions include the 1995 show "Seven Stories about Modern Art in Africa", and his work has been presented in international exhibitions. Further, Diab is the author of art historical studies on the visual arts of Sudan.

== Life and artistic career ==
Diab grew up the son of a government employée in Wad Madani, a regional capital city in east-central Sudan. He studied at the College of Fine and Applied Art in Khartoum, from which he graduated in 1978 with honours. Sponsored by a scholarship from the government of Spain, he continued his studies the following year at the Complutense University of Madrid, where he obtained degrees both in painting and graphic arts. In 1991, he obtained his PhD from the same university with a thesis on the ‘Philosophy of Sudanese Art’ in 1991. Following this, he became the first lecturer from an African country at the university's Faculty of Fine Arts. After having lived in Spain for 20 years, he returned to Khartoum in 1999. From then on, Diab was active as a painter, art teacher and director of his Rashid Diab Cultural Center and Dara Art Gallery in Khartoum, the latter managed by his son Yafil Mubarak. Due to the 2023 war in Sudan, he was forced to return to his former home in Madrid in 2023.

As art historian, Diab has co-authored articles on Modern Art in Sudan in a 2009 handbook of Sudan and in the 1989 publication on Contemporary Art from the Islamic World. His daughter Dar Al-Naim is a visual artist of Sudanese and Spanish descent.

== Reception ==
The Encyclopedia of African History describes Diab's colourful style as an exemplification of the generation of artists that followed Sudanese pioneers like Ibrahim El Salahi of the School of Khartoum and "developed a more universal aesthetic, that merges Western, African, and Islamic influences and expresses cultural identity in a global context." His paintings of Sudanese women in colourful toubes surrounded by vast desert-like spaces have been described as images "suspended in absolute nothingness, without context or reference to any living thing."

Diab's work has been exhibited internationally and included in private collections. In 1995, he was one of the participating artists of the exhibition "Seven Stories about Modern Art in Africa" held at the Whitechapel Gallery in London as part of the Africa95 festival. In 2020, the Bahrain Museum in Manama held a retrospective exhibition of Diab's paintings, carvings, sculptures and drawings. On this occasion, the Bahrain Authority for Culture and Antiquities published the monographic work Beyond the Silence focusing on Diab’s life as an artist and his contribution to cultural and social development of Sudanese art and society.

After Diab was forced to abandon his art center and personal collection by the outbreak of the war in Sudan on 15 April 2023, he managed to take refuge in the capital of Spain. Despite this, he could present a new exhibition titled “Season of Bitter Migration” at Barrak Naamani Gallery in Beirut, Lebanon, in June 2023. In 2023 and the following year, art galleries in Lisbon, Portugal, and Madrid, Spain presented the group exhibition of contemporary art from Sudan Disturbance in the Nile, including works by Rashid Diab, Mohammed A. Otaybi, Reem Aljeally and other Sudanese visual artists. The artworks had been flown out of Khartoum on 14 April 2023, just one day before the start of the war in Sudan. Almost all of the artists, including Diab, were driven into exile.

== Gallery ==
Diab in 2015 and 2016
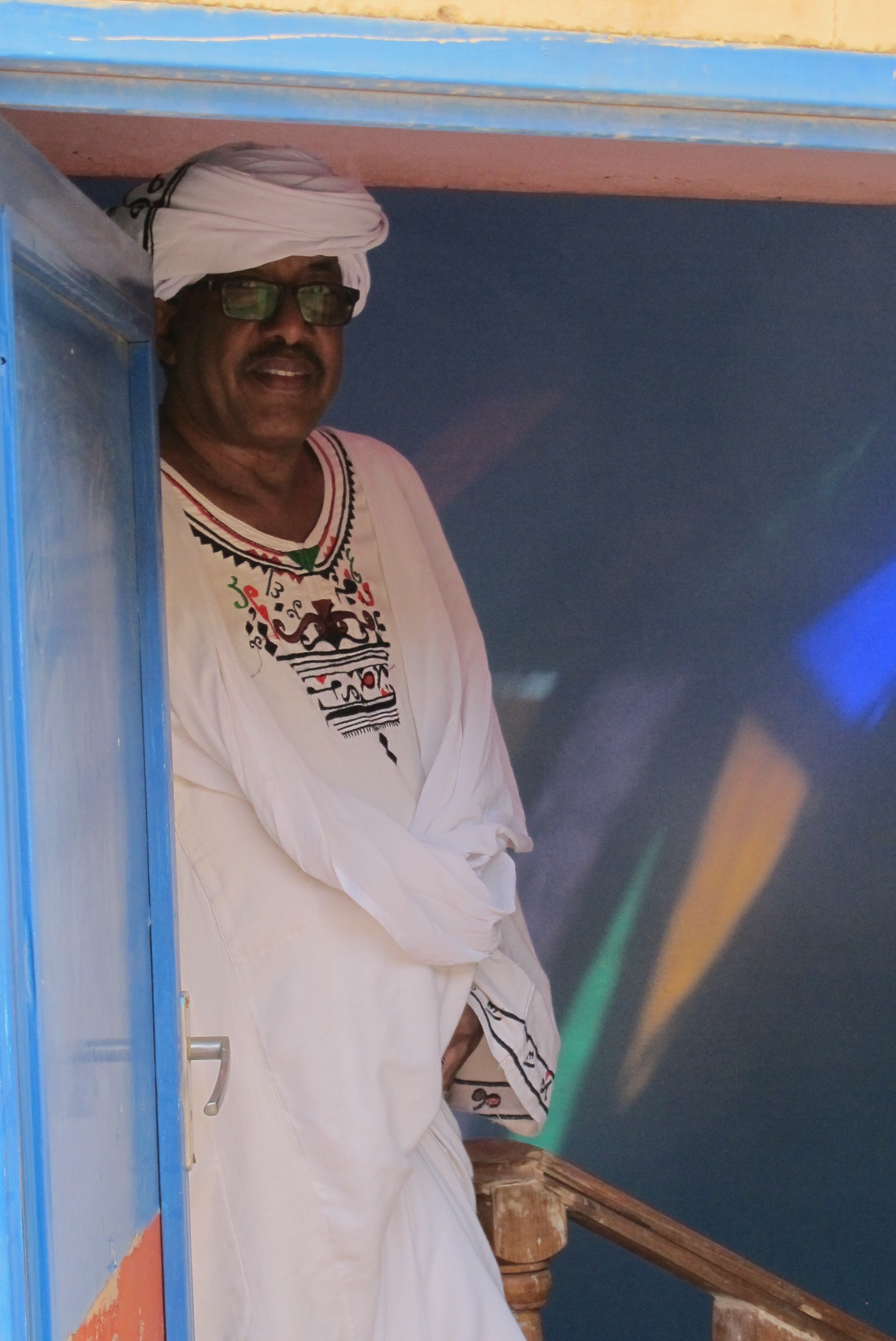
Diab at the Rashid Diab Centre in 2015

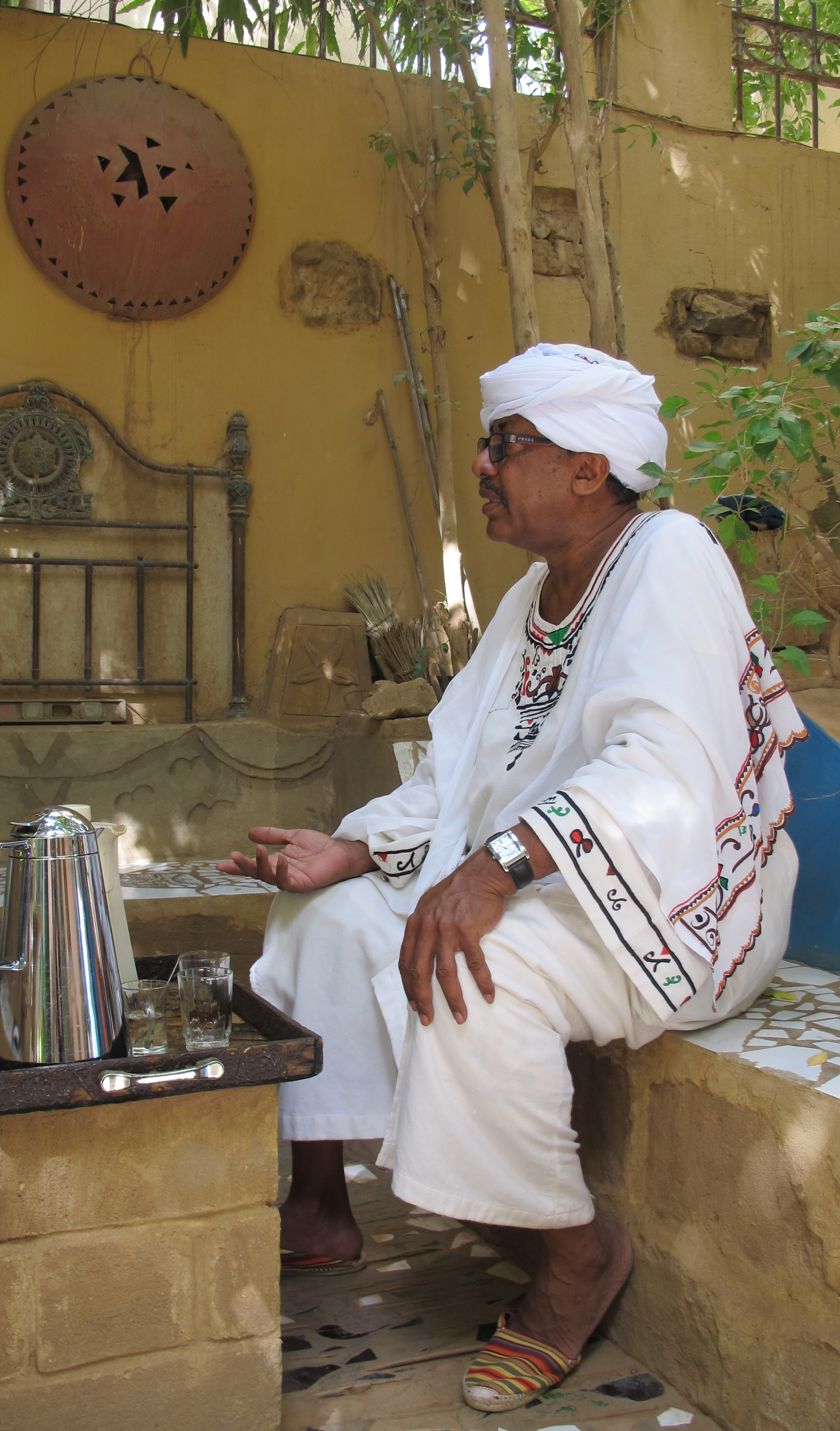
Diab in the garden of his cultural centre in 2015

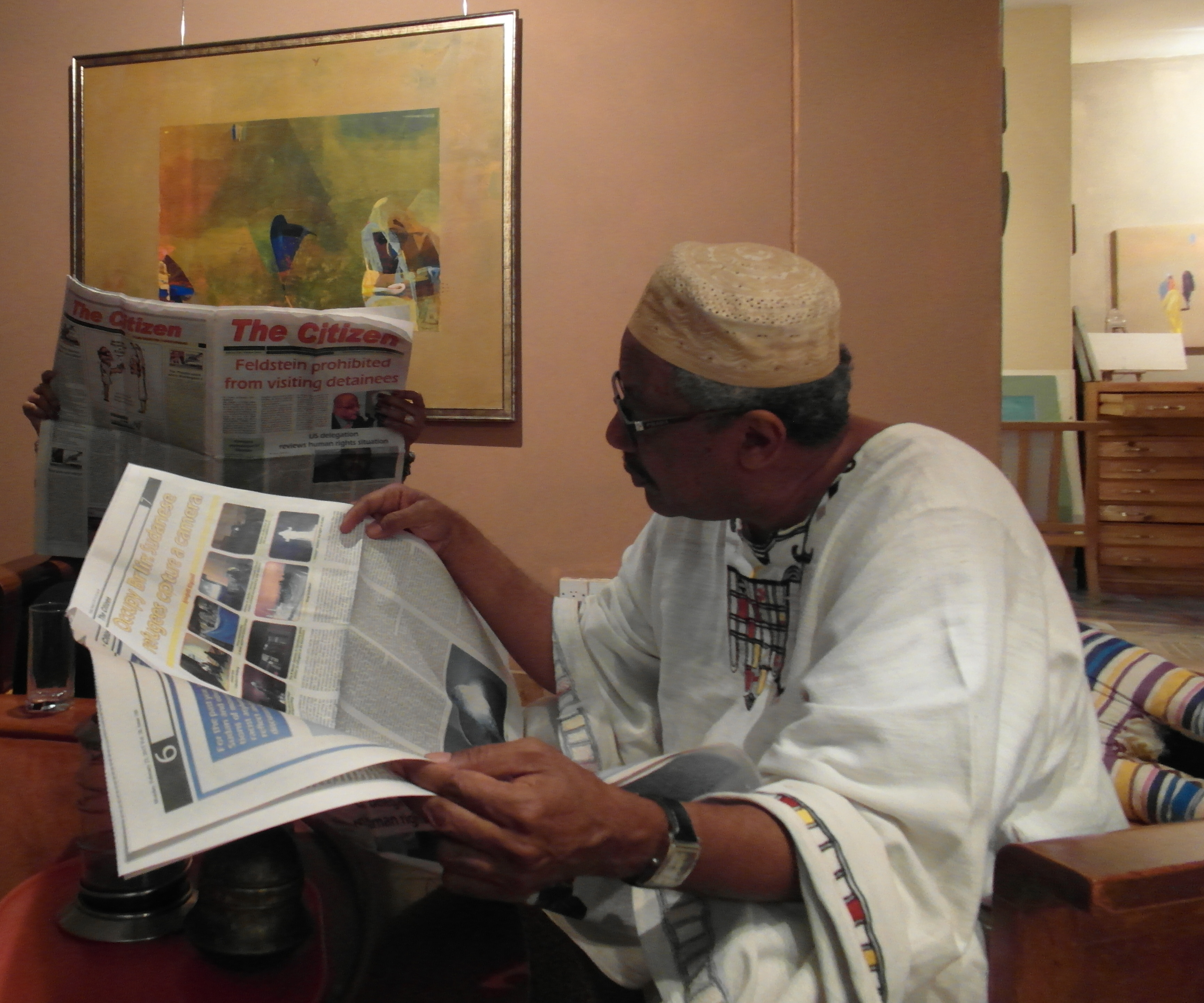
Diab in his living room reading The Citizen with an essay by Magdi Elgizouli and photos by Tobias Zielony for the German Pavilion at the 56th Venice Biennale.

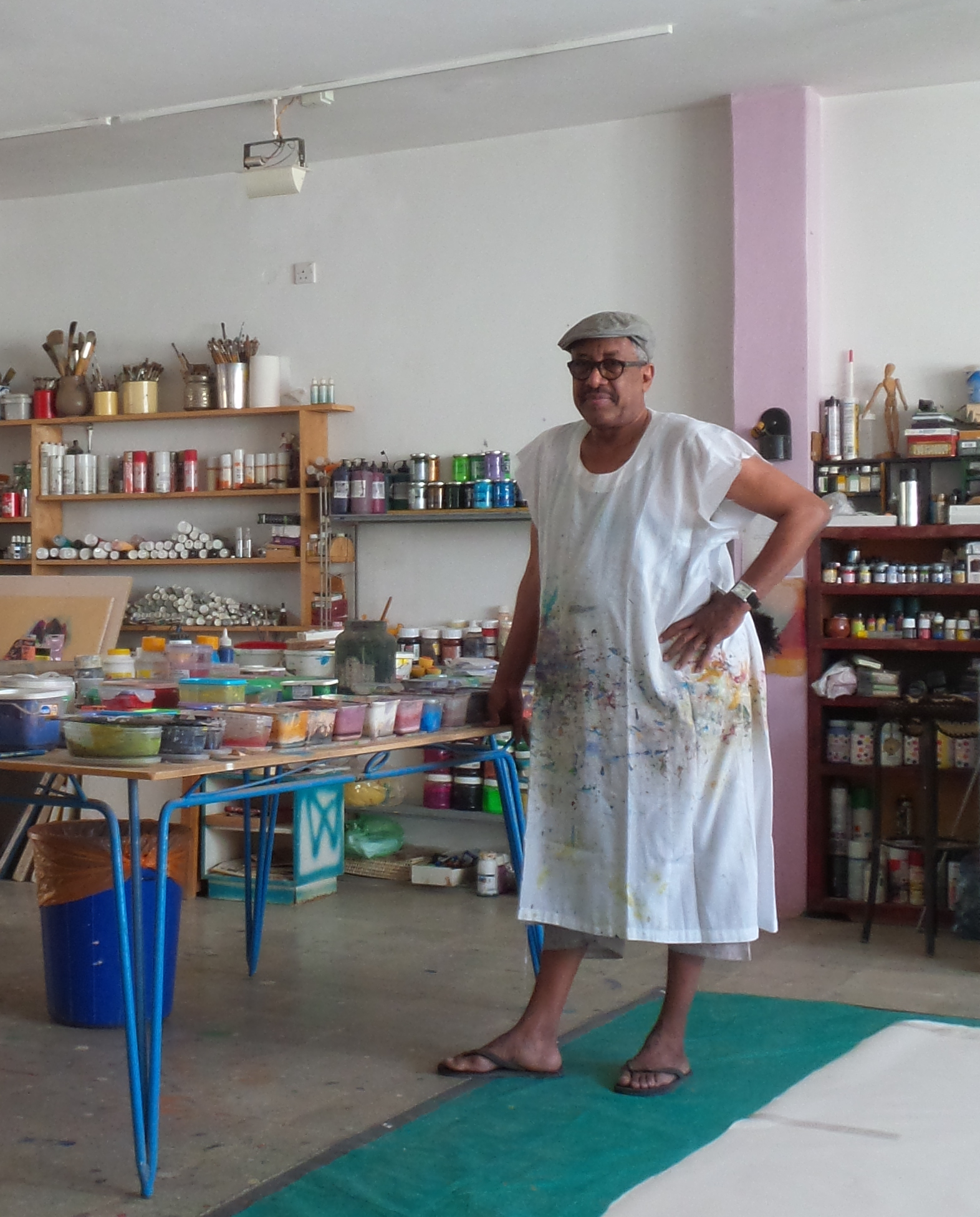
Diab in his studio in Khartoum-Amarat in 2016.

== See also ==
- Visual arts of Sudan
- Contemporary African art
