= Dongola Limited Editions =

Beirut-based publishing house

- Founded: 2017
- Headquarters: Beirut, Lebanon

Dongola Limited Editions is a publishing house for artists' books cofounded by Abed Al Kadiri and Sarah Chalabi, in addition to Reza Abedini as an art director. The house is based in Beirut and specialises in dealing with books as a dialogue between the literary and visual. The books embody cultural, social, and political relationships.

The publishing house sustains its novel building practice through its curatorial nature by which its books extend to curatorial practice. For instance, Homeland Under my Nails is an exhibition by artist Mohammed Omar Khalil curated by Abed Al Kadiri which allows for the book to be presented as a part of a larger narrative of belonging.

Along with curatorial practice, the house reaches out to artists in the MENASA (Middle East, North Africa and South Asia) region. In Cities Under Quarantine: the Mailbox Project, Dongola Limited Editions distributed books which are handmade and hand-stitched to more than 50 artists in the region so they can reflect on the current situation in light of the COVID-19 pandemic.

== Publications ==
Dongola Limited Editions publishes artist's books which deal with societal issues through artistic mediums and cultural productions such as Season of Migration to the North, the Distance is Always the Other, the Book of Mud, Jerusalem in Exile and more.

Season of Migration to the North is a novel by Tayeb Saleh about his migration from Sudan to England, Dongola Limited Editions published a book with the same name but based on etchings produced by Mohammad Omar Khalil. This book provides a dialogue between the novel and the visual production.

The Distance is Always Other is another example of the publishing house's production which is a collaboration between the artist work of photographers Noel Nasr and Chris Coekin. The book, designed by Dongola Limited Editions' creative team, foregrounds changes that happened to the urban landscape of Lebanon between two time frames: before the Lebanese Civil War and in 2016 when Coekin discover the online archive of images.

Ali Cherri, author of “The Book of Mud” (published by Dongola Limited Editions), received the Silver Lion at “the 59th International Art Exhibition of La Biennale di Venezia 2022”, for the new multi-channel video installation “Of Men and Gods and Mud” (2022) at “The Milk of Dreams“, where the artist traces the history of the Merowe Dam, one of the largest hydroelectric dams in Africa, located on the Nile River in Northern Sudan.
