= Diaa Jubaili =

Iraqi novelist

- Born: 23 May 1977 (age 49); Basra
- Occupation: Writer
- Writing career
- Notable works: No Windmills in Basra; What To Do Without Calvino?; "The Worker" in Iraq + 100; "The Darwinist" in Strange Horizons
- Notable awards: Al-Multaqa Prize for Arabic Short Fiction (2018); Tayeb Salih International Award for Creative Writing (2017); Dubai Culture Award (2007)

Diaa Jubaili (Arabic: ضياء جبيلي, (Ḍīya Jubaylī); born 23 May 1977) is an Iraqi novelist and writer from the city of Basra.

== Biography ==
Diaa was born in Iraq in 1977 in the city of Basra, where he is permanently based. He became a writer and novelist in an environment which did not afford him a traditional education and also writes articles about life in Iraq. An extensive reading of Western literature is an influence on his work. In his fiction writing, he focuses on questions of identity in Iraq as well as the tension between religion and nationalism.

Diaa has won literary awards for his writing in Arabic. In 2017, he won the seventh annual Tayeb Salih International Award for Creative Writing for his novel What To Do Without Calvino?.

His short story collection, No Windmills in Basra, won the 2018 Al Multaqa Prize for the Arabic Short Story. The large prize purse of USD$20,000 is to encourage the short story genre in the Arab world. The stories span three wars: Iran-Iraq war, 1991 Gulf War, and the 2003 American invasion. The jury for Al Multaqa praised the collection for its descriptions of war by "moving between reality and fantasy," use of sarcasm, introspection, absurdity, nihilism, and "a genuine desire to overcome the futility of death."

== Bibliography in Arabic ==
=== Novels/Novellas ===
- 2007: Curse of the Marquis (لعنة ماركيز Lʿanat Mārkīz)
- 2009: The Ugly Face of Vincent (novella) (وجه فنسنت القبيح Wajh Finsint Alqabīḥ)
- 2011: Bogeys, the Bizarre (novella) (بوغيز العجيب Būġīz il-ʿajīb)
- 2014: General Stanley Maude's Souvenir (تذكار الجنرال ستانلي مود Taḏkār il-jinrāl sitānlī mawd)
- 2016: The Lion of Basra (أسد البصرة ʾasad il-baṣra)
- 2017: The Cloven Man: Six Ways of Crossing Borders Illegally on the Way to Baghdad (المشطور, ست طرائق غير شرعية لاجتياز الحدود نحو بغداد Al-mašṭūr, sittu ṭarāʾiq ġayr šarʿiyya liʾitiyaz il-ḥudūd naḥu baġdād)
- 2018: Name Upon the Hollow, (الاسم على الأخمص Al-ʾism ʿalā al-ʾaxmaṣ)
- 2019: Horse Cannon (ساق الفرس Sāq ul-faras)
- 2025: The Seer (الرائي)

=== Short story collections ===
- 2017: Widows' Garden, (حديقة الأرامل Ḥadīqat ul-ʾarāmil)
- 2017: What To Do Without Calvino?, (ماذا نفعل بدون كالفينو Māḏā nafʿalu bidūn kālfīnū)
- 2018: No Windmills in Basra, (لا طواحين هواء في البصرة Lā ṭawāḥīn hawaʾ fīl-baṣra)

=== Articles ===
- 2018 Sep 13, "Pollution and corruption are choking the life out of Basra", The Guardian
- Diaa has other articles written in Arabic.

=== English translations ===
- "The Worker" in the short story anthology Iraq +100. Translated by Andrew Leber. Comma Press. 17 November 2016. ISBN 978-1-905-58366-9.
- "The Darwinist", short story published in Strange Horizons. Translated by Alexander Hong. Strange Horizons Magazine. 30 October 2017.
- The Cloven Man novel excerpt in Banipal, issue #61. Translated by Yasmeen Hanoosh. Banipal Magazine of Modern Arabic Literature. 2018.
- "The Scarecrow" in the short story collection No Windmills in Basra. Translated by Yasmeen Hanoosh. ArabLit Quarterly. Spring 2019.

== Awards and honours ==
- 2007: UAE Dubai Magazine Award for Curse of the Marquis
- 2017: Sudan Tayeb Salih International Award for Creative Writing for the short story collection Widows' Garden (Arabic: جائزة الطيب صالح العالمية لإبداع الكتابي)
- 2018: Kuwait Al Multaqa Prize for the Arabic Short Story for No Windmills in Basra (Arabic: جائزة الملتقى للقصة القصيرة العربية)
- 2026: International Prize for Arabic Fiction shortlist for The Seer
