= Fawzi Boubia =

Moroccan writer and university teacher

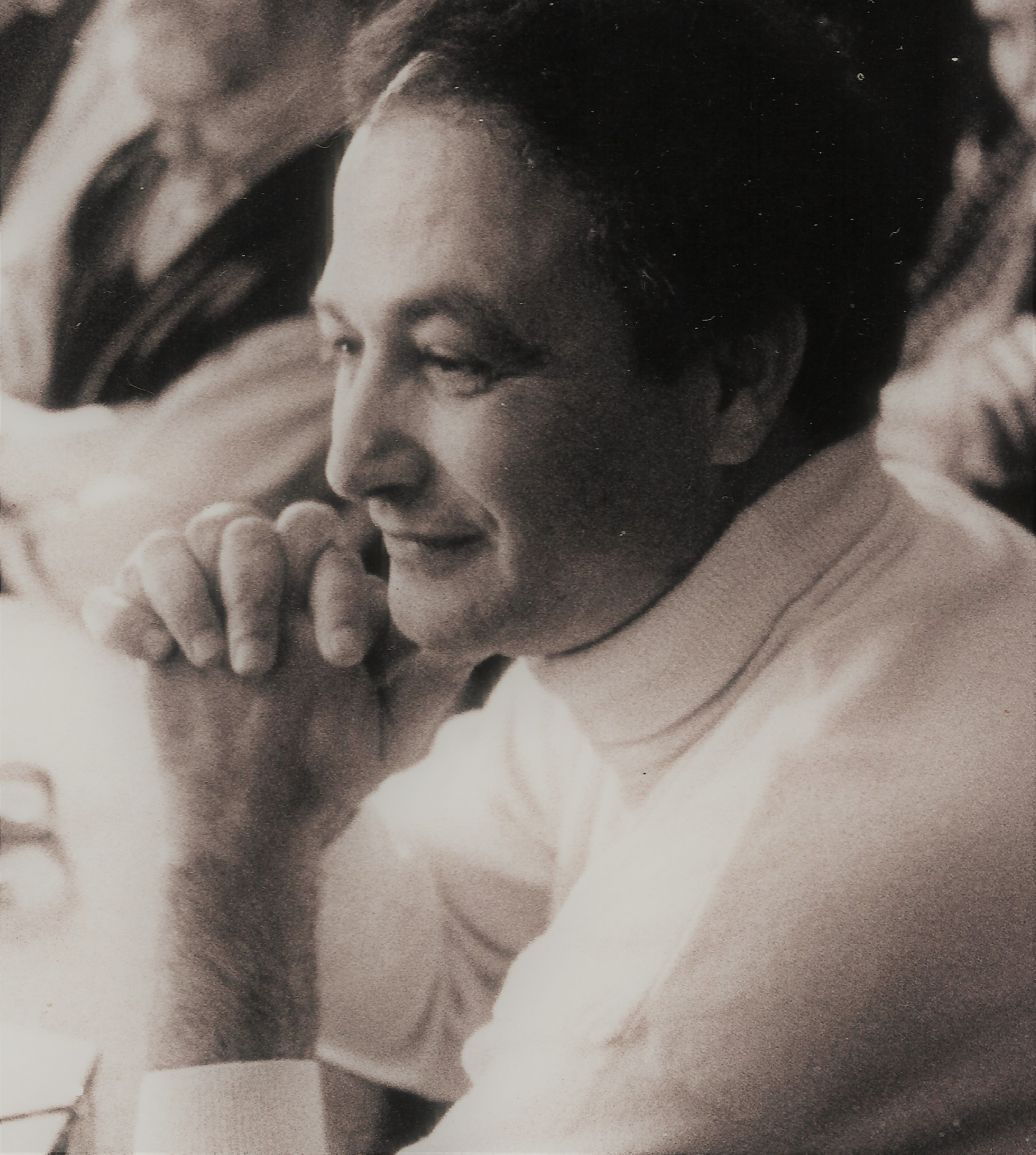
- Boubia in 1997
- Born: December 8, 1948 (age 77); Khemisset
- Occupation: writer

Fawzi Boubia (Arabic: فوزي بوبية; born in 1948) is a Moroccan intellectual. He is a university professor and German-speaking writer for a culture of dialogue between the two shores of the Mediterranean.

== Biography ==
Fawzi Boubia was born in 1948 in Khemisset Morocco, Boubia as the son of the Moroccan nationalist and historian Si Ahmed Boubia. After Islamic school and the Arab public school, he joined the high schools of the French Mission in Meknes (Paul-Valéry high school) and in Rabat (Lycée Descartes high school) where he obtained his BA in the "Philosophy-Letters" section. As a teenager he had already written an Arabic teaching book intended for French-speaking students, a manual received positively by his teachers and by the Mission. After earning his bachelor's, he went to Germany to pursue higher studies.

Boubia graduated from the University of Heidelberg with a master's degree in Literature and Political Sciences, then a doctorate in philosophy from the Sorbonne, University of Paris IV, Habilitation. Boubia is a philosopher, writer, and historian of relations between the East and the West. He has been published in German, French and Arabic. He was responsible for the first German section in Morocco, newly created in 1976 at the Mohammed-V University in Rabat where Boubia worked as a professor of German literature and civilization.

Boubia has given courses at the universities of Heidelberg and Karlsruhe and several conferences around the world. In the early 1980s, with Professor Arnold Rothe and other colleagues, he initiated Maghrebian studies at the University of Heidelberg. He currently teaches at the University of Caen where he created and headed for many years the Voi (es) x research team on exile and migration.

== Works ==
Boubia is the author of a dozen books and numerous scientific articles. He published a book on politics and theatre in the 18th century, and a novel that is considered the first Moroccan novel translated into German: Heidelberg-Marrakesch, einfach.

On the occasion of his invitation to the Rauris Literary Festival in Austria (Rauriser Literaturtage, 1997) to present his novel Heidelberg-Marrakesch, einfach, he read and published the first German-language poem, "Scheherezade in dürftiger Zeit".

His publications revolve around issues including exile and migration, theory of difference and cosmic literature (Goethe), philosophy of exclusion (Hegel), philosophy of negativity (Rousseau), intercultural communication, Orientalism and Occidentalism, the Arab Spring as the third "Al-Nahda" (Renaissance), and Islam as an integral part of Europe.

In an article he published on the occasion of the Arab Spring in Arabic, he invented the Arabic concept of "irhalocracy" (the power to dismiss the executive through free elections according to the political philosophy of critical rationality), he intended to replace the term "democracy", which is often overused by rulers in the East. Long before the first popular uprising that erupted in Tunisia, Boubia denounced in an Arabic interview given in 2010 on German television (Deutsche Welle TV) the taboos which block any process of emancipation in the Arab world and which mainly concern the place of religion in society, politics, and sexuality.

In January 2014 Boubia had the honor to present in Germany his collection of poems Arabischer Divan in der Sprache Goethes. He recited his poems written directly in German in front of the Academy of Stuttgart (Akademie für gesprochenes Wort) and in Tübingen in the Tower of Hölderlin, this temple of universal poetry.

== Awards and recognition ==
- General Competition: Arabic Language and Literature, 1967
- Worked as a researcher at the Alexander von Humboldt Foundation (1983–1984)
- Founding member and member of the board of directors of the Society for Intercultural Germanistics (Gesellschaft für interkulturelle Germanistik, 1980s and 1990s)
- Member of the scientific committee of the European Arab University (with Mohamed Aziza, 1980s)
- Member of the Scientific Council of the Transcultura Institute with Umberto Eco and Alain Le Pichon (1880s)
- Attended the General Conference at the Seventh Le Monde-Le Mans Philosophical Forum (1995)
- Hosted as a writer at the Rauris literary festival in Austria (Rauriser Literaturtage, March 1997) on the occasion of the publication of his novel Heidelberg-Marrakesch, einfach by Éditions Kinzelbach (Mainz, 1996).
- Worked as a visiting professor at the Center for Literary and Cultural Research in Berlin (Zentrum für Literatur- und Kulturforschung, May–June 1999)
- Member of UNESCO's advisory commission with Tayeb Salih and other writers to launch of the "Arabia Plan"
- Founder and director of the Voi (es) x research team on exile and migration at the University of Caen (1998-2005)
- Attended the session of the Europe - Mediterranean Knowledge Space Foundation (WEM): The Mediterranean on the spot - a series of events of the German network of the Anna Lindh Foundation; Institut für Auslandsbeziehungen (ifa), Stuttgart, April 2011
- Established and led the"Wertewelten" research team (Worlds of values, since 2011)
- Received an honorary diploma from the Faculty of Letters and Human Sciences of Rabat on the occasion of the commemoration of the 40th anniversary of Germanic Studies at Mohammed V University as part of the 40 symposium in March 2016

== Publications ==
Individual and collective works:

- Theater of Politics - Politics of Theater (Lang-Verlag, Frankfurt, 1978).
- Heidelberg-Marrakech, simple. Roman, Kinzelbach-Verlag, Mainz, 1996.
- Exile and Migration, Proceedings of the Caen conference (Dir. MRSH, Caen 2003).
- The Zemmour Tribes and the National Movement (Arabic: Qaba'il Zemmour wa al-Haraka al-Wataniyya); Dir. publications of the Faculty of Letters and Human Sciences, University of Rabat, 2003. 720p.
- The Western Book of the Eastern Author (Arabic: Al-Kitab al-Gharbi li al-Mu'allif al-Charqui), Roman, Lit-Verlag, Vienna, 2004.
- Exile and Migration, proceedings of the Vienna colloquium (Dir. in: Das Verbindende der Kulturen, INST, Wien, 2004).
- Migrations, Emigrations- and Remigrationskulturen, Proceedings of the colloquium of the International Association of Germanistics, vol. 6 (Dir. In collaboration with Anne Saint Sauveur-Henn and Frithjof Trapp), Peter Lang, 2007.
- The thought of the universal, Goethe contre Hegel, Marsam Publications, Rabat, 2007.
- Hegire in the West, Roman, Marsam Publications, Rabat, 2012.

== Writings about him ==
- Fawzi Boubia's first romantic itinerary in German. Putting Moroccan tolerance to the test of xenophobia." In the fourth edition July 1996.
- Salwa Idrissi-Moujib, Fawzi Boubia. Heidelberg - Marrakech, simple. Mainz: Donata Kinzelbach, 1996.
- Mustafa Maher, Fawzi Boubia, Roman Heidelberg-Marrakech, Das Andere Deutschland. In: Ulrich Müller (Hg.), Intersection of Cultures, Stuttgart, Akademischer Verlag 1998, p. 397-408.
- Ulrich Müller, Margarete Springeth, Intercultural Conflicts between Islam and Europe: The novel Heidelberg-Marrakech, (1996) by Fawzi Boubia. In: Internet magazine for cultural studies no 5, 5 juillet 1998.
- Habib Mazini, Migration to the West, by Fawzi Boubia in "Marsm" Editions: A Vital Tribute to Intelligence from All Sides. In: Release, 13 April 2012.
- Zakariae Soltani, Fawzi Boubia Heidelberg-Marrakech, arrival in the space of cultural hybridity. In: Beyond Rif and Ruhr: 50 Years of Moroccan Migration to Germany, edited by Andreas Pott, Khatima Bouras-Ostmann, Rahim Hajji, Soraya Moket, Springer-Verlag, 2014. p. 190-198.
- Michaela Holdenried, Ghost Talks. Fawzi Boubia intercultural self-questioning in Heidelberg-Marrakech, (1996). In: Journal of the Korea Women's Research Institute Sungshin University, 2013, p. 5-22.
- Mohammed Elbah, The question of return using the example of Boubia's work "Heidelberg-Marrakech. In: Elbah, Hasbane, Möller, Moursli, Tahiri, Tazi (eds.), Interculturality in Theory and Practice, Publications de l'Université Mohammed V, Rabat, 2015, p. 92-100.
