= The Wedding of Zein =

Novella by Sudanese author Tayeb Salih

- Author: Tayeb Salih
- Original title: عرس الزين
- Translator: Denys Johnson-Davies
- Language: Arabic
- Publication date: 1966
- Publication place: Sudan

The Wedding of Zein (Arabic: عرس الزين, romanized: ʿUrs az-Zayn) is an Arabic novella by the late Sudanese author Tayeb Salih. It was partially published in Arabic in 1964, fully published in 1966 and translated into English in 1968. Within the realm of Arabic literature, the book is considered a classic and was republished as part of the influential Heinemann African Writers Series.

The story is set in the fictional village of Wad Hamid, the same setting as Salih's famous Season of Migration to the North.

== Plot summary ==
The story opens with the village hearing the news of Zein's upcoming nuptials. Because Zein is regarded as the village idiot, the people as a whole are greatly surprised that any family agreed to give their daughter to him.

The rest of the story unfolds non-linearly. The first section is an account of Zein's childhood and young adulthood, focusing on his strange ability to draw attention to village girls by falling in love with them. After he sings their praises, other people notice the girls, resulting in their advantageous marriages. Because of this, the other villagers invite him over in hope of his falling in love with their daughters. Zein is also distinguished by his friendship with Haneen, a Sufi holy man who did not associate closely with anyone else in the village. He is also close to many of the socially shunned, such as Mousa the Lame, a disabled former slave.

The middle of the story focuses on other villagers of Wad Hamid, such as Zein’s fiancée Ni’ma, his enemy Seif ad-Din, and the men of Mahjoub’s gang, the men who run the village.

The turning point of the story is an encounter between Zein and Seif ad-Din. Seif ad-Din attacks Zein while he is standing and conversing with Mahjoub's gang. Zein retaliates with unexpected strength and begins to strangle him, but before he can actually kill Seif ad-Din, he is stopped by Haneen, who blesses both men and the village as a whole. Seif ad-Din vehemently apologizes to Zein and the group of men exchange kind words. In the following year, Haneen dies. Not long after his passing the village experiences multiple miracles, which they attribute to the ascetic, consequently naming the year “Haneen’s year”. The story climaxes with one of these miracles: the wedding of Zein the fool to the most beautiful, intelligent, devout, and sought-after girl in the village—Ni'ma.

== Main characters ==
Zein: Zein is an unconventional man from the moment of his birth, when he entered the world laughing rather than crying. He also has a non-traditional physical appearance, which Salih describes at length: he has a long face with prominent bones, with only one tooth on his bottom jaw and one on the top, a long neck and long arms, which are described as resembling those of a monkey, broad shoulders, and prodigious, unsuspected strength, which becomes dangerous when he gets in fights. Notably, Zein is completely hairless, lacking even eyebrows and eyelashes. He has an enormous appetite that leads him to attend as many social events as he can, where he inevitably irritates his hosts by eating too much. Kenneth Harrow argues that Zein's outsized appetites are "signs or metaphors for other, higher appetites," because he is meant to represent the perfect Sufi saint. Areeg As-Sawi Mohammed Ballag argues that Zein's name is meaningful, because it literally refers to decoration, which is ironic, because Zein himself is physically unattractive, although he still decorates the village with his spiritual excellence.

Haneen: Haneen is a holy man who spends half his year in the village and the other half living ascetically. No one in the village knows exactly where he goes for the second half of the year. Zein is the only person with whom Haneen is friendly towards. Haneen's blessing affects numerous miracles in the village, including turning the criminal Seif ad-Din into a model citizen, helping with harvest and prosperity, and causing Zein's marriage to Ni'ma. Ballag writes that his name is linguistically related to the words for great feelings and deep sincere emotions, as well as compassion and mercy, underscoring his role as the bringer of mercy to the village.

Ni'ma: Ni'ma is the most beautiful girl in the village. She is unusually serious and studious. As a child, she was the only girl in the elementary school. However, although she was devoted to learning the Quran at the elementary school, she rejects her brother's suggestion that she continue her schooling, because she claims that non-religious education is nonsense. Although she is approached by a number of respectable suitors, she rejects them all, until she decides that her destiny is to marry Zein. Ballag writes that Ni'ma's name, which means blessing, was chosen to emphasize the fact that her marriage to Zein is the conferring of a blessing upon him.

Mahjoub's gang: Mahjoub's gang is composed of men between the ages of thirty-five and forty-five who rule the village. They are farmers by vocation. They are not particularly religious, but they do understand the importance of religion to the community, so they collect the Imam's salary from the other villagers every month and see to repairs in the mosque. They organize all important social functions in the community, including weddings, burials, and funerals. They also manage irrigation of the Nile and other important practical matters in the village.

The Imam: the Imam is the officially designated spiritual leader of the village; however, he does not connect well with the other villagers, because of his lack of concern with their daily lives and his fixation on fire and brimstone preaching in his sermons. He is the only person in the village hated by Zein.

Seif ad-Din: Seif ad-Din, at the beginning of the story, is an unrepentant sinner who gets drunk frequently, visits prostitutes, disobeys and disrespects his parents and uncles, and is suspected of living a life of crime in the city when he isn't in the village. Ahmad Nasr claims that Seif ad-Din represents all the negative values associated with modern city life. Harrow argues that Seif ad-Din is a foil for Zein, because, unlike Zein, his outward appearance, with his beard and ever present traveler's bag, resembles that of a traditional Sufi saint, yet his interior is perfectly rotten at the start of the story. Additionally, both men are ruled by love: Seif ad-Din's final break with his father is caused by his desire to marry a prostitute, while Zein is defined by his ability to draw attention to the village girls through his love of them. After his encounter with Zein and Haneen, Seif ad-Din turns his life around. He treats his father's former slaves kindly, where before he had neglected them. He abstains from drinking. He settles down and marries his cousin. He even calls the adhan at the mosque.

== Setting ==
The Wedding of Zein, like many of Salih's works, takes place in the village of Wad Hamid in northern Sudan. The literary critic Ami Elad-Boulaski writes that the shared setting, in addition to the repeated themes and recurring characters, allows Salih's works to be viewed as part of one coherent world. Elad-Boulaski believes that this world is more fully realized because a reader can track the development of characters throughout multiple novels and short stories.

Constance Berkeley and Osman Ahmed, in their introduction to a translation of four interviews with Salih, argue that he focuses on the village, as opposed to the city, because the village represents pre-colonial culture. Salih himself explains that Wad Hamid "represents the center of civilization in Sudan." He also attempts to achieve a pan-Arab universality through his description of the village; as he puts it: "the atmosphere depicted of the Sudanese village in The Wedding of Zein resembles to a great degree the same atmosphere in the Syrian, Algerian, and Egyptian village. The people in the Arab homeland resemble each other more than they realize. The day will soon come in which all Arabs will discover, for us, unity is a question of life or death."

Despite the fictional nature of the work, the account of Sudanese village life depicted therein is considered accurate enough to be an anthropological record. For example, Sondra Hale writes that by reading the novella, "one can learn as much about Sudanese village life as from most ethnographic studies." Wail Hassan differs from Hale, in that he does not make the argument that the village as depicted functions as an academic source for understanding real Sudanese village life. However, he does note that the narrator seems to view the village at a distance, through an ethnographic lens: "the quasi-anthropological gaze of the third-person narrator, who is clearly an outsider, serves to undercut the villagers' worldview...The narrator reports the beliefs of the villagers, neither vouching for nor discrediting those beliefs, but insisting nevertheless on their peculiarity."

The world of Wad Hamid, as depicted in the novella, is a utopia. Salih himself explains that the world of The Wedding of Zein, unlike the same village in his other writing, represents the world as it should be, because of the happiness and stability that is so easy to come by. Salih goes on to say that this utopia is best symbolized through the coming together of the entire village at Zein's wedding, which is possible only because Zein is the perfect representation of a unifying Sufi element.

Hassan presents the publication date as one possible reason for the novella's depiction of a utopia, because, in his opinion, the novella "expressed the boundless optimism generally characteristic of the early years of independence." However, he also does not believe that the novella's utopia is stable, because the climax of the story is Zein's wedding, and people traditionally come together at weddings and funerals and then return to their divisions afterwards. Therefore, even though the coming together is more dramatic at Zein's wedding than at other weddings, Hassan believes that the novella implies it will fall apart afterwards, just like any other temporary unity.

== Literary criticism ==
Popular Islam

Scholars see one of the central tensions in the novel as that between popular Islam, represented by the holy man Haneen and his disciple Zein, and orthodox Islam, represented by the figure of the Imam. Some view the division between the two camps as absolute. For example, Ali Abdalla Abbas argues that institutionalized religion, as represented by the Imam, contains no holiness or blessedness whatsoever, because it is overly concerned with dogma. Similarly Ahmad Nasr writes that popular Islam is glorified over institutionalized Islam because, "Salih seems to equate mysticism with happiness."

Others view the pairing as more complementary. While Kenneth Harrow agrees that they both represent different approaches to religion, he couches the difference not in terms of the presence or absence of holiness, but rather as the Imam representing the written word, while Haneen represents the oral, both necessary in their own way. Wail Hassan makes a similar point explicitly when he writes, "Haneen and the imam are not antagonists, the one nourishing the spiritual life of the villagers, the one impoverishing it, respectively, which is how the two religious figures have often been represented by commentators on the novella." He supports his point by highlighting the fact that the Imam is reading a particularly blessed verse from the Quran at the same time that Haneen is blessing the village, implying that they are working in concert with one another.

The supernatural versus the secular

Salih says that he "accept[s] the world of magic" and that the world depicted in this novella is deliberately "not secular and things do not go according to scientific rules." He chose to write the world in this manner as a deliberate argument against socialist realism, which Sondra Hale identifies as the dominant artistic style in mid-century Sudan. Thus, this novella may be considered part of the tradition of magical realism.

The role of women in a traditional Sudanese society

Eiman El Nour writes that all of Salih's works feature "forceful female characters who in their own way rebel against the age-old traditions of a taboo-laden, rural, male-dominated society" of which Ni'ma is just one typical example because of her early participation in the school system and her insistence of choosing her own husband. Ami Elad-Bouskila concurs with this assessment of Ni'ma as one iteration of the headstrong village girl that appears elsewhere in Salih's works. However, she adds that Ni'ma and her sisters in the other novels and short stories are not realistic depictions of Sudanese women. Rather, they symbolize Salih's hope for societal change.

Not all scholars agree that Ni'ma represents an unconventional figure. Wail Hassan argues that she "breaches only the outward aspect of tradition," because her rebellion is still based in Islam, the accepted religion of all the villagers. Additionally, her convictions ironically lead her to marry her cousin, the most conventional choice in a traditional Sudanese society. Hassan argues that Ni'ma ultimately "affirms social convention over vanity," because she marries her cousin despite the fact that he is the village idiot.

The impact of modernization on village life

Ami Elad-Bouskali describes the changing view of Wad Hamid's inhabitants towards modernization as depicted in the various stories set in the village. She writes that modernization has begun in The Wedding of Zein, in that new technology has been introduced into the village, but no voices of opposition have yet been discovered.

Some scholars have tied the theme of modernization to another central theme of the novel, popular Islam. Ahmad Nasr writes that the novella ultimately argues that "modernization could be achieved under the auspices of popular Islam," because Haneen's blessing of the village encompasses the addition of new technology.

== Film ==
Ali Mahdi (Zein) and Tahiya Zaroug (Ni'mi) starred in the film. It was first released in 1976 and directed by Kuwaiti director Khalid Alsiddig.
