= Palm branch =

Symbol of victory, triumph, peace and eternal life

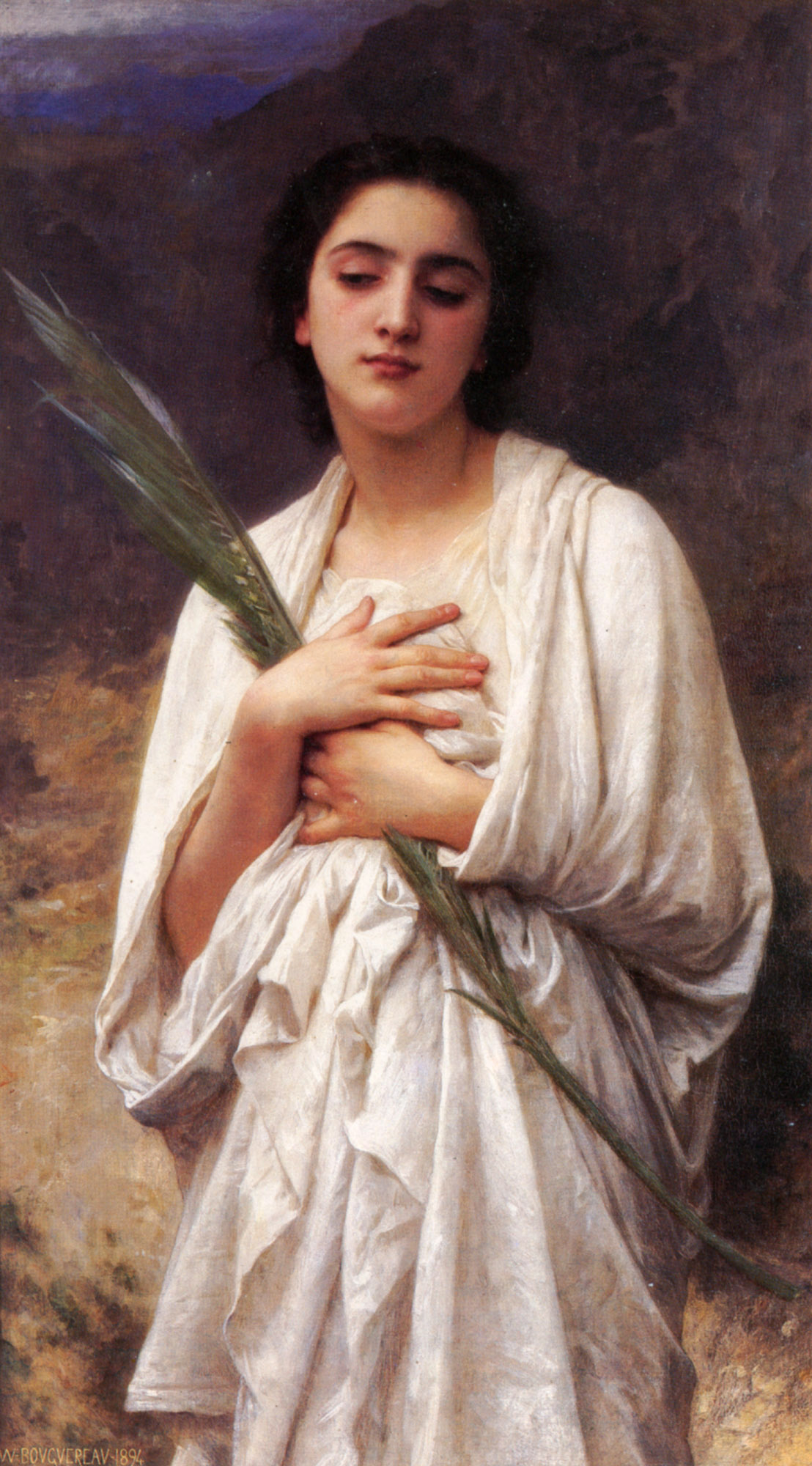
The Palm Leaf by William-Adolphe Bouguereau (1825–1905), portrait of an unidentified woman in ancient dress

The date palm branch or frond is a symbol of victory, triumph, peace, and eternal life originating in the ancient Near East and Mediterranean world. The date palm (Phoenix) was sacred in Mesopotamian religions, and in ancient Egypt represented immortality. In Judaism, the lulav, a closed frond of the date palm is part of the festival of Sukkot. A palm branch was awarded to victorious athletes in ancient Greece, and a palm frond or the tree itself is one of the most common attributes of Victory personified in ancient Rome.

In Christianity, the date palm branch is associated with Jesus' Triumphal Entry into Jerusalem, celebrated on Palm Sunday, when the Gospel of John says of the citizens, "they took palm branches and went out to meet Him" (12:13 HCSB). Additionally, the palm has meaning in Christian iconography, representing victory, i.e. the victory of the spirit over the flesh (Revelation 7:9).

Since a victory signals an end to a conflict or competition, the date palm developed into a symbol of peace, a meaning it can have in Islam, where it is often associated with Paradise.

Palm trees appears on several flags or seals representing countries or other places, its symbolism extends to the coconut palm (in the same Arecaceae family) in flags associated with the tropics.

== Antiquity ==
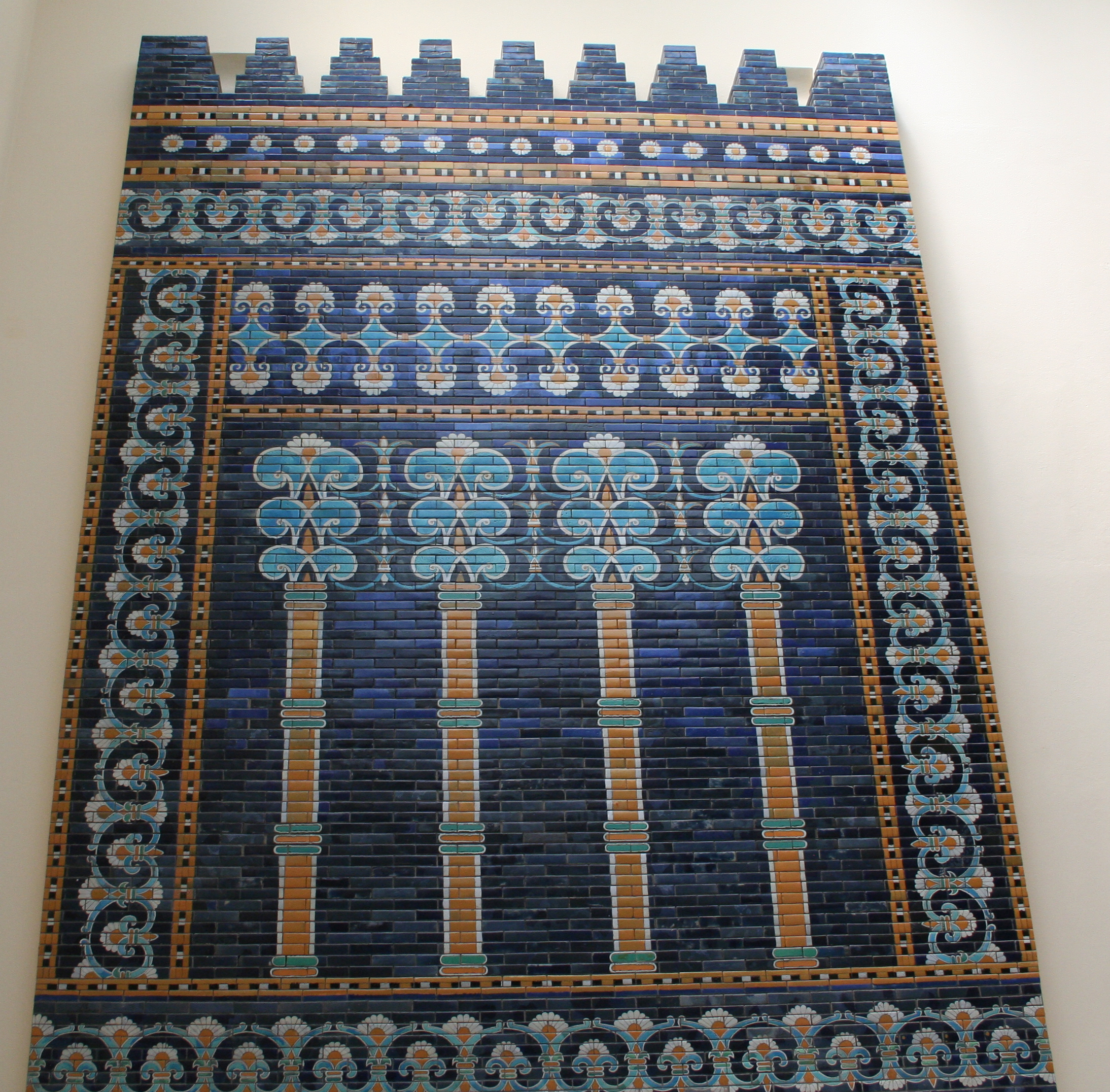
Stylized palms on the Ishtar Gate, Babylon (ca. 575 BC)

In Assyrian religion, the palm is one of the trees identified as the Sacred Tree connecting heaven, represented by the crown of the tree, and earth, the base of the trunk. Reliefs from the 9th century BC show winged genii holding palm fronds in the presence of the Sacred Tree. It is associated with the goddess Ishtar and is found on the Ishtar Gate. In ancient Mesopotamia, the date palm may have represented fertility in humans. The Mesopotamian goddess Inanna, who had a part in the sacred marriage ritual, was believed to make the dates abundant. Palm stems represented long life to the Ancient Egyptians, and the god Huh was often shown holding a palm stem in one or both hands. The palm was carried in Egyptian funeral processions to represent eternal life. The Kingdom of Nri (Igbo) used the omu, a tender palm frond, to sacralize and restrain. Some argue the palm in the Parthian poem Drakht-e Asurig serves as a reference to the Babylonian faith.

The palm was a symbol of Phoenicia and appeared on Punic coins. In ancient Greek, the word for palm, phoinix, was thought to be related to the ethnonym.

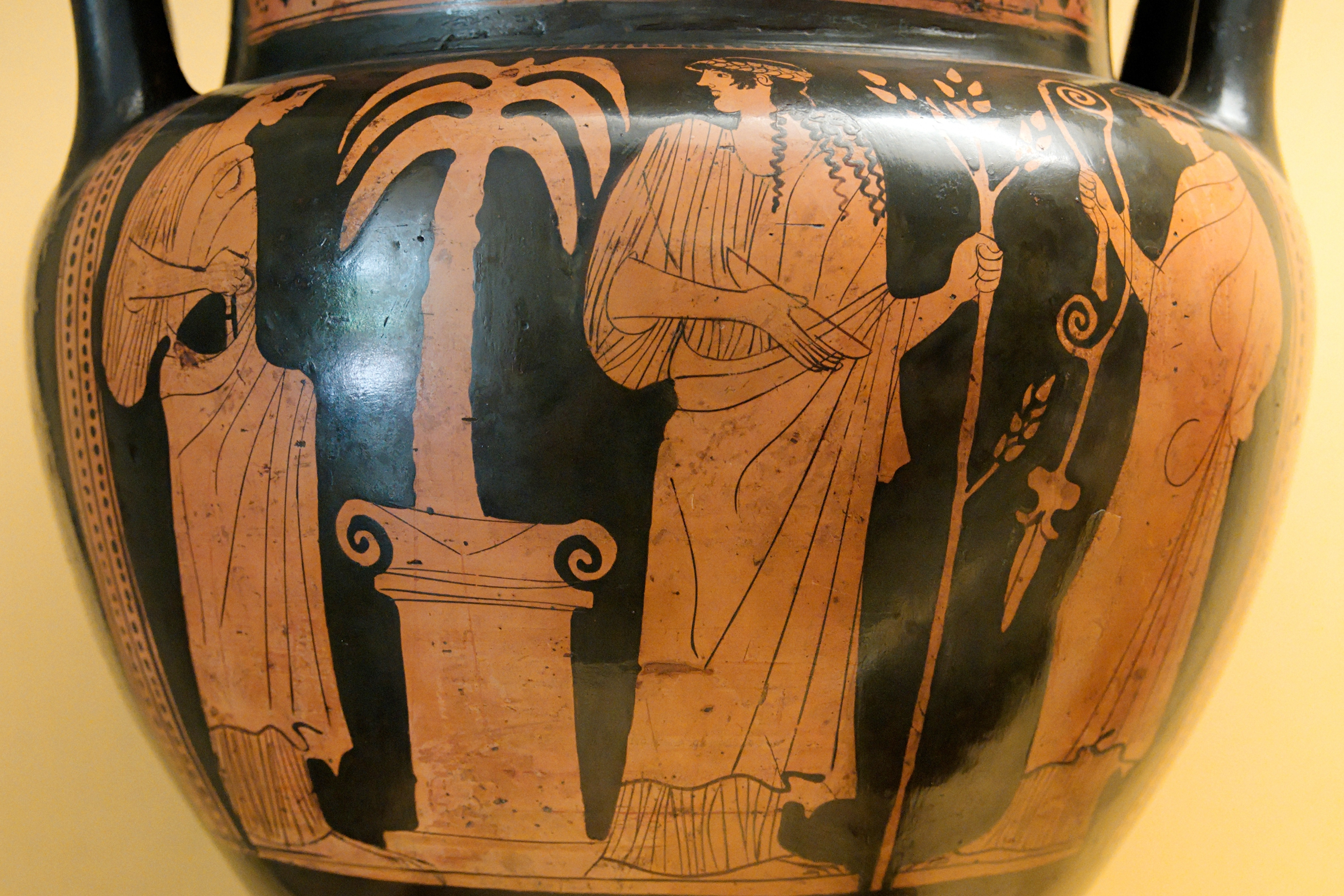
Apollo holding a laurel branch and libation bowl, next to a palm that represents his birth on Delos (Comacchio Painter, c. 450 BC)

In Archaic Greece, the palm tree was a sacred sign of Apollo, who had been born under a palm on the island of Delos. The palm thus became an icon of the Delian League. In recognition of the alliance, Cimon of Athens erected a bronze statue of a palm tree at Delphi as part of a victory monument commemorating the Battle of the Eurymedon (469/466 BC). In addition to representing the victorious League, the bronze palm (phoinix) was a visual pun on the defeated Phoenician fleet. From 400 BC onward, a palm branch was awarded to the victor in athletic contests, and the practice was brought to Rome around 293 BC.

The palm became so closely associated with victory in ancient Roman culture that the Latin word palma could be used as a metonym for "victory", and was a sign of any kind of victory. A lawyer who won his case in the forum would decorate his front door with palm leaves. The palm branch or tree became a regular attribute of the goddess Victory, and when Julius Caesar secured his rise to sole power with a victory at Pharsalus, a palm tree was supposed to have sprung up miraculously at the Temple of Nike, the Greek counterpart of Victory, in Tralles, later known as Caesarea, in Asia Minor. The toga palmata was a toga ornamented with a palm motif; it was worn to celebrate a military triumph only by those who had a previous triumph. The toga itself was the garment of the civilian at peace, and was worn by the triumphator to mark his laying down of arms and the cessation of war. The use of the palm in this setting indicates how the original meaning of "victory" shaded into "peace" as the aftermath of victory.

Coins issued under Constantine I, the first Christian emperor, and his successors continue to display the traditional iconography of Victory, but often combined with Christian symbolism such as christograms. The Roman senator Symmachus, who tried to preserve Rome's religious traditions under Christian domination, is pictured on an ivory diptych bearing a palm branch in an allegorical triumph over death.

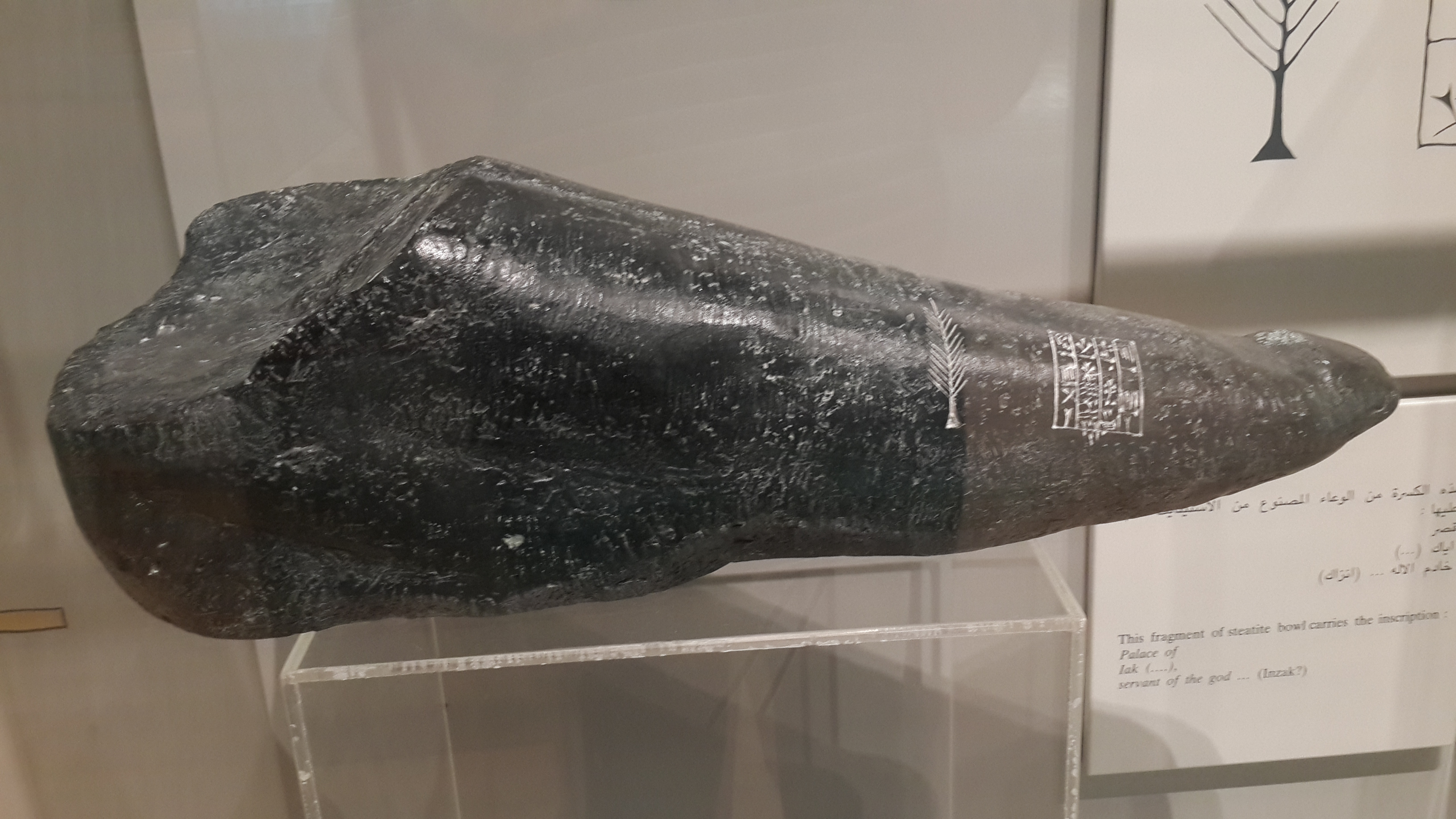
Palm branch inscribed on the Durand Stone (Kassite period, 1600–1155 BC)

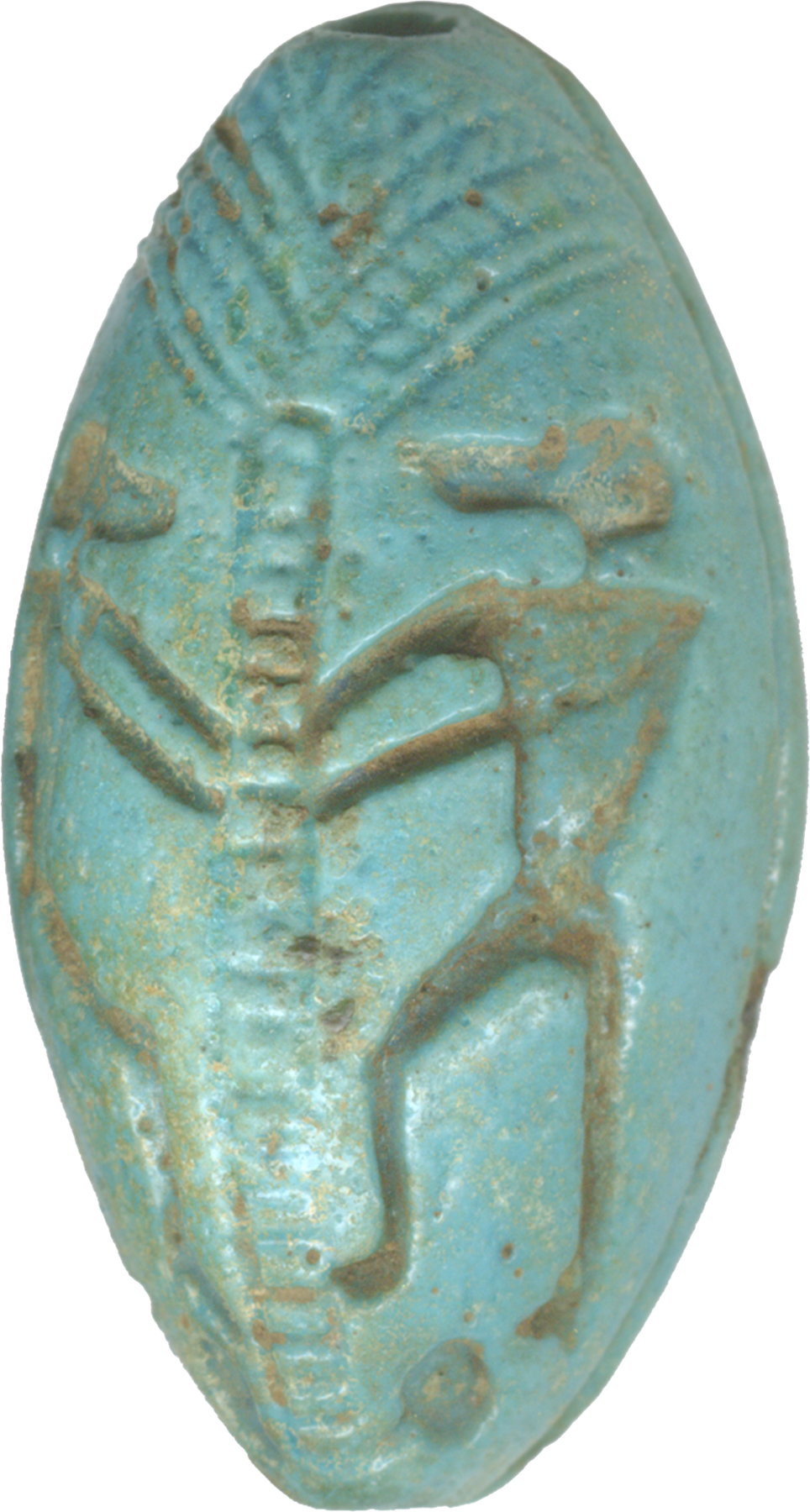
Monkey next to a palm, symbolizing the sun god's daily rising, on an Egyptian amuletic bead (ca. 1300 BC)

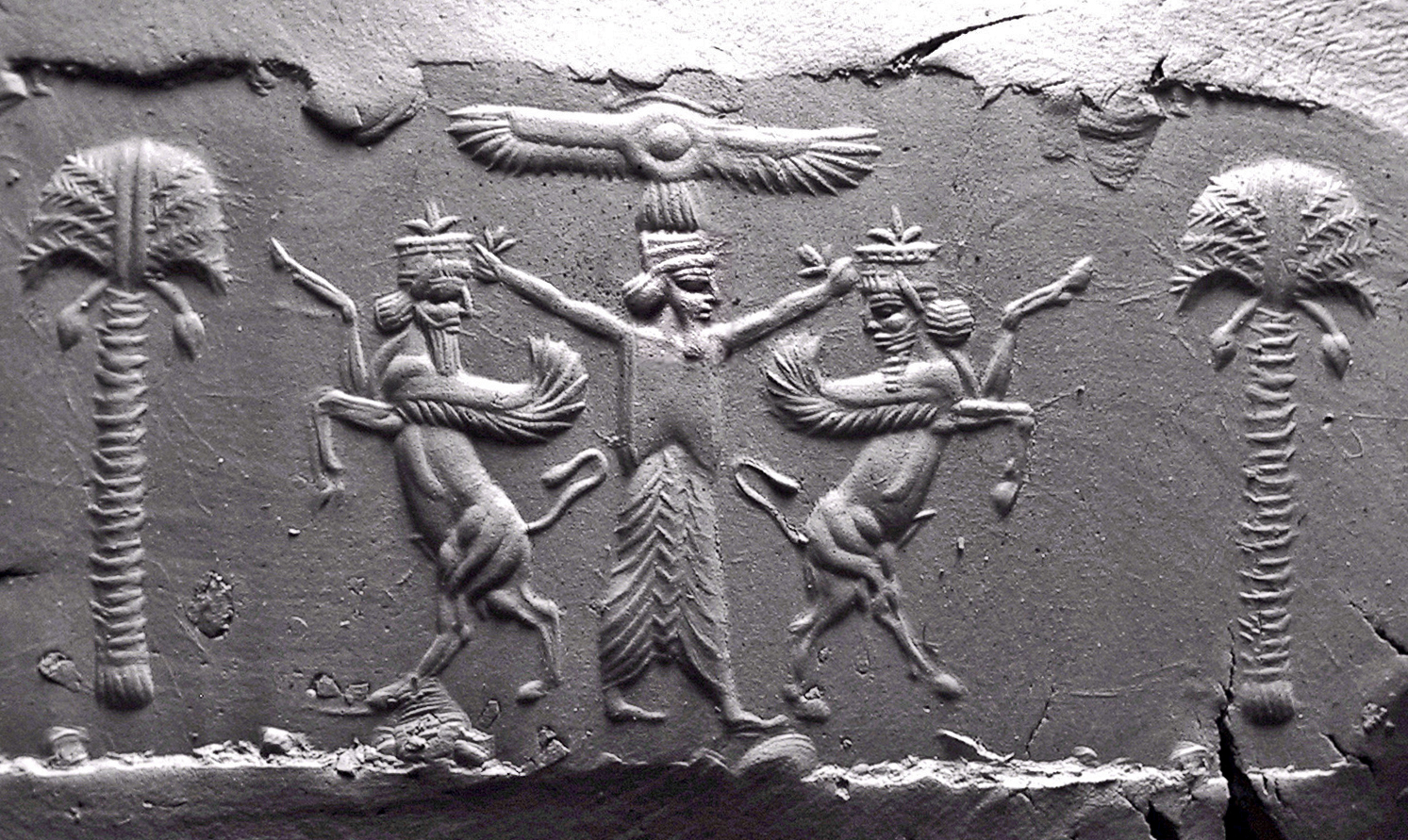
Palms on an Achaemenid seal impression (5th century BC)

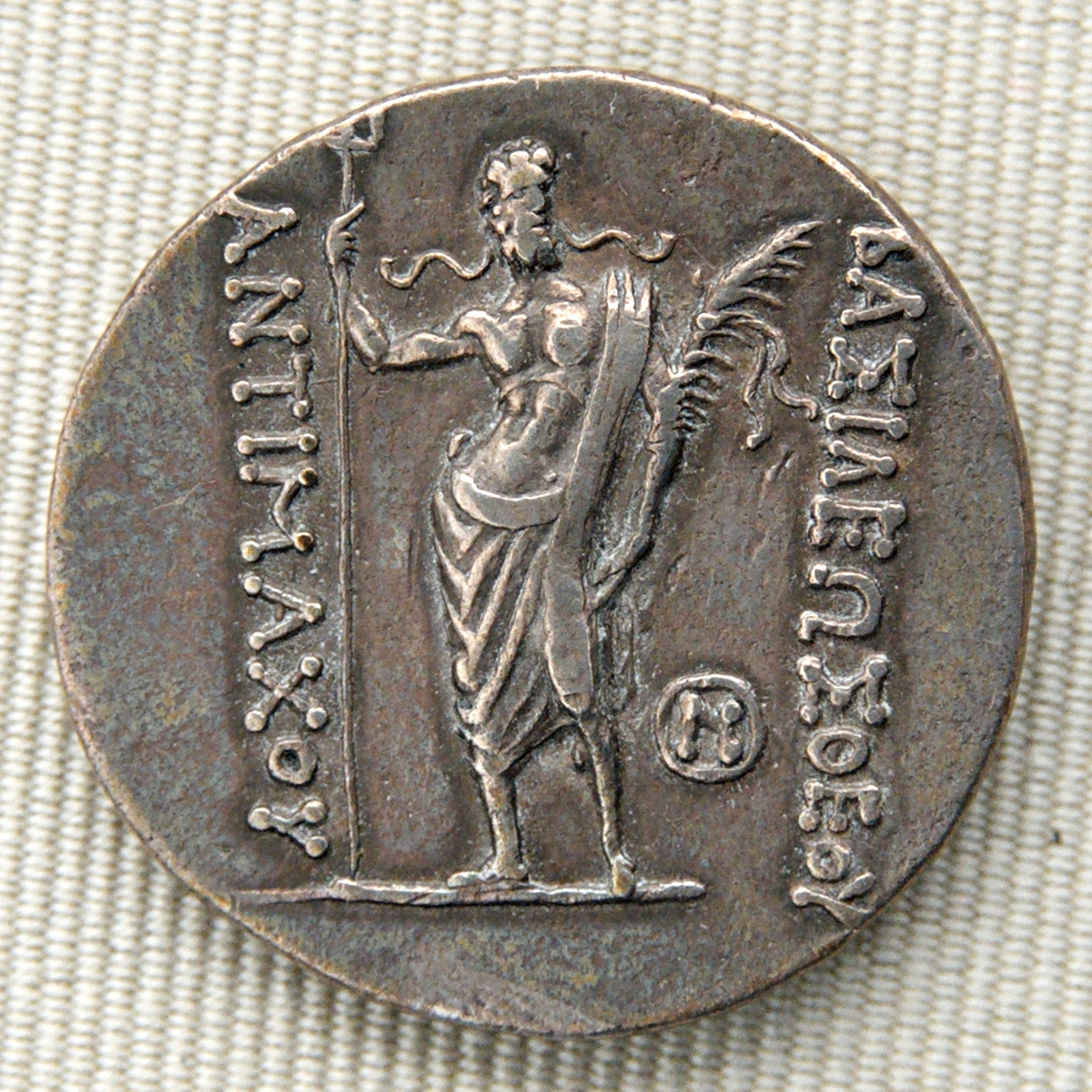
Poseidon holding a palm branch on the reverse of a tetradrachm of Antimachus I Theos, king of Bactria (2nd century BC)

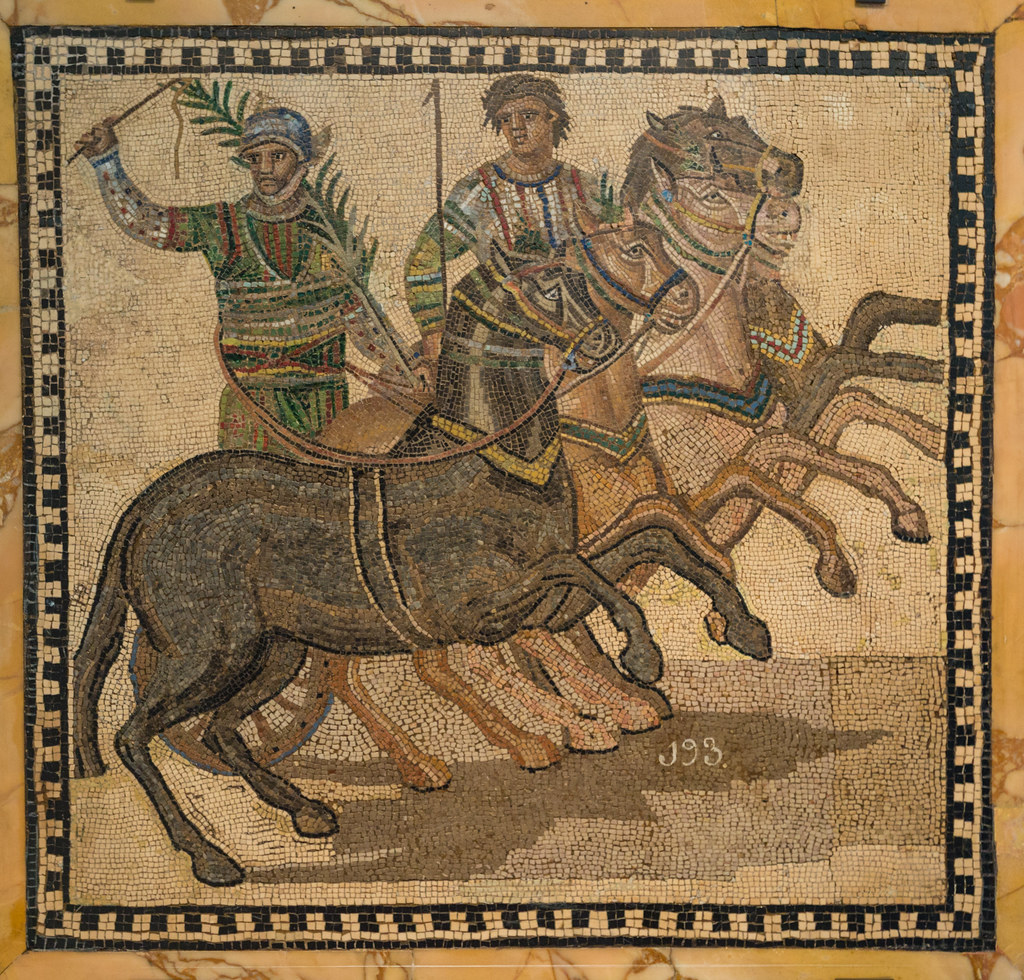
Victorious charioteer holding a palm branch on a Roman mosaic

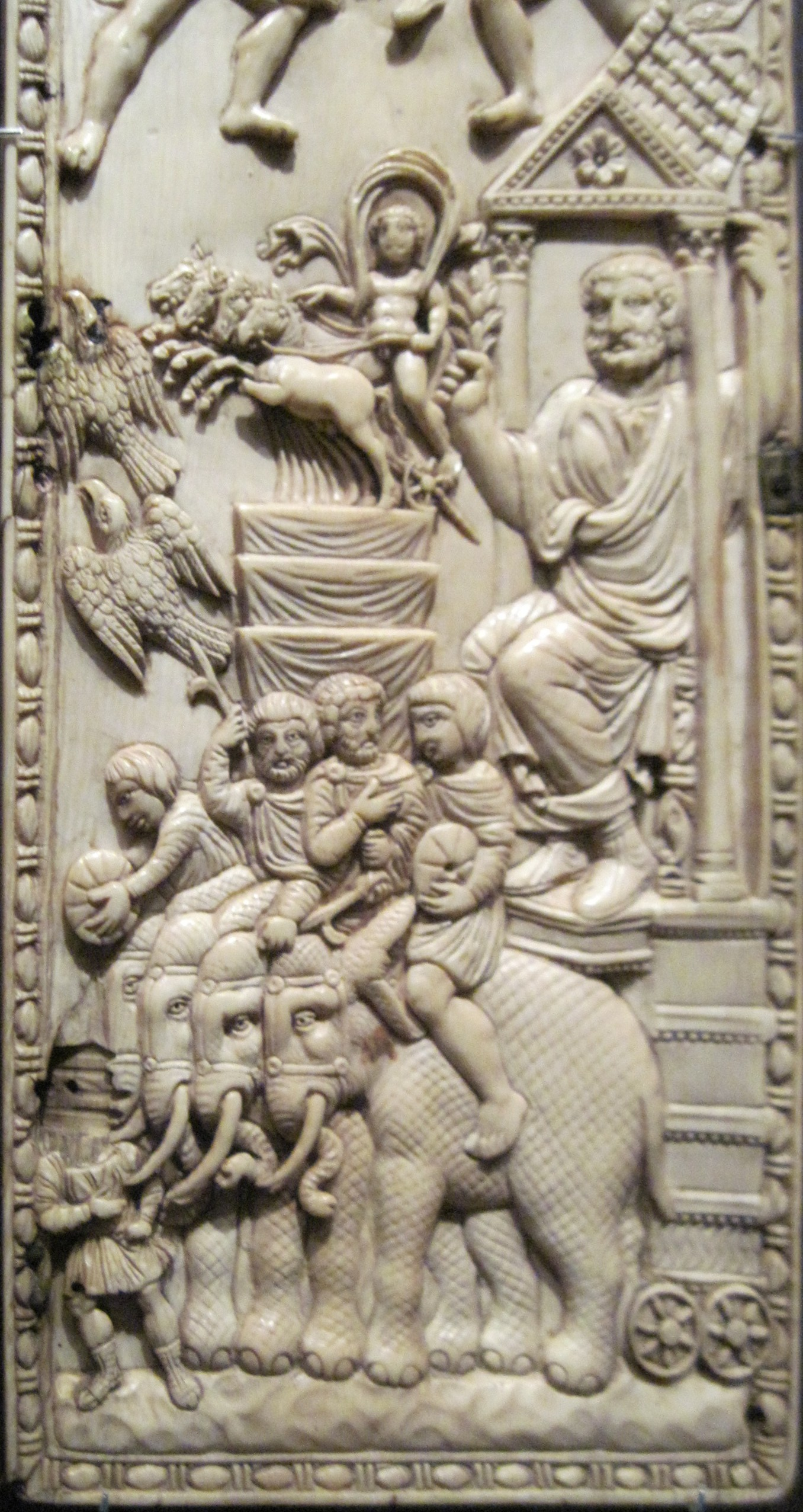
Symmachus bearing the palm of triumph over death (4th century)

== Judaism ==
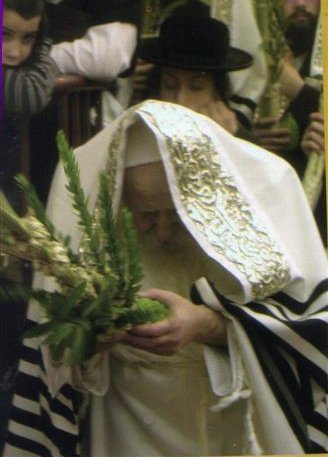
The Tosher Rebbe of Montreal, Canada waving the Four Species during Hallel

In Judaism, the date palm (Lulav) is one of the Four Species used in the daily prayers on the feast of Sukkot. It is bound together with the hadass (myrtle), and aravah (willow). The Midrash explains that the lulav symbolises the victory of the Jewish people when they came before God in judgement on Rosh Hashanah. Additionally, the Midrash notes that the binding of the Four Species symbolizes the desire to unite the four "types" of Jews in service of God.

During the Roman Empire, the date palm represented Judaea and its fecundity to both Romans and Jews. Roman sources praise the date as the produce of the province. The date palm was a frequent image for Judaea on Imperial coinage, most notably on the Iudaea Capta series, when the typical military trophy is replaced by the palm. The palm appears also on at least one Hasmonean coin and on coinage issued in 38–39 AD by Herod Antipas. Palm ornaments are found also on Jewish ossuaries.

In 1965, Judean date palm seeds dated at around 2000 years old were recovered during excavations at Herod the Great's palace on Masada in Israel. In 2005, some of the seeds were planted. One grew and has been nicknamed "Methuselah".

== Christianity ==
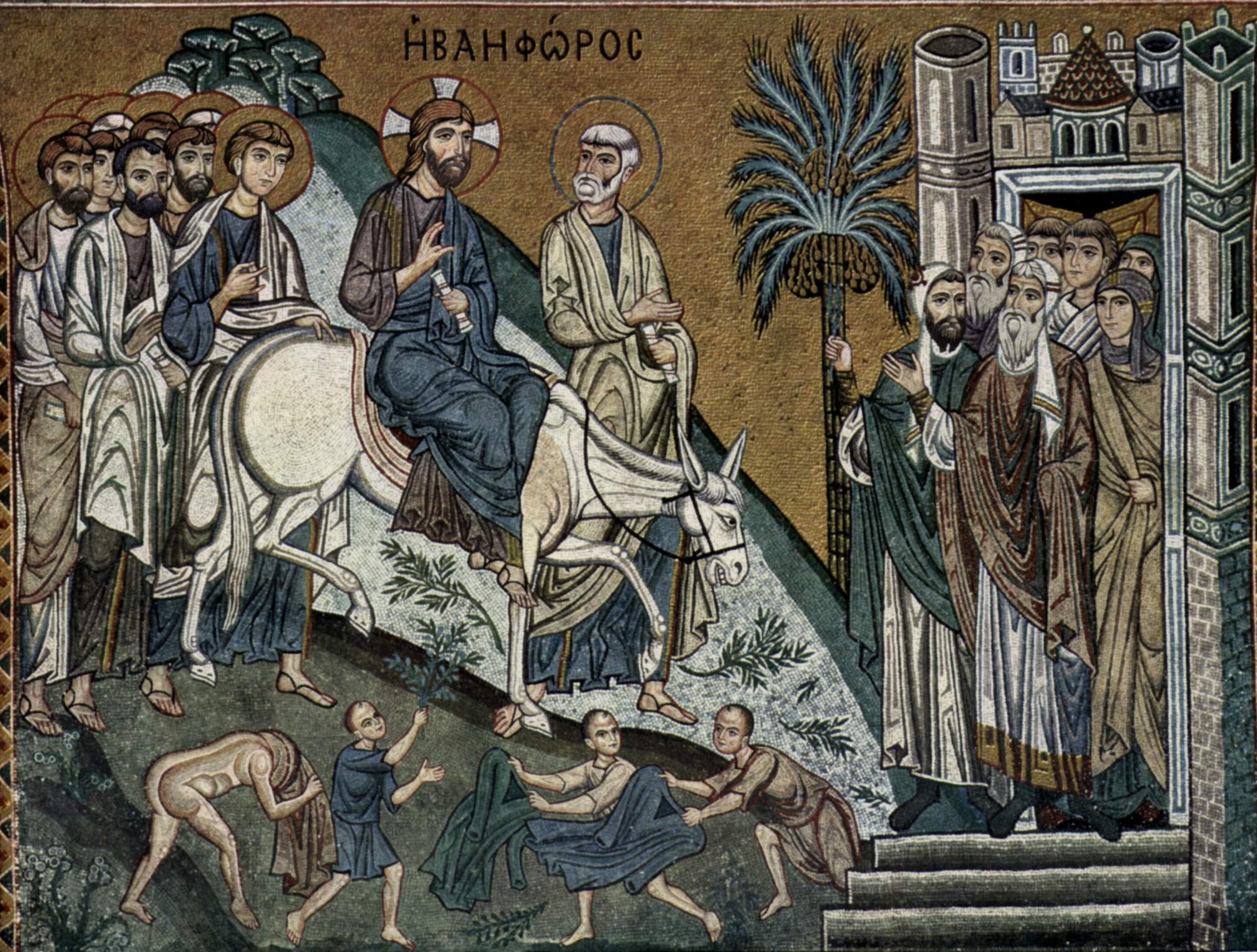
Triumphal entry into Jerusalem on a mosaic from Palermo, ca. 1150

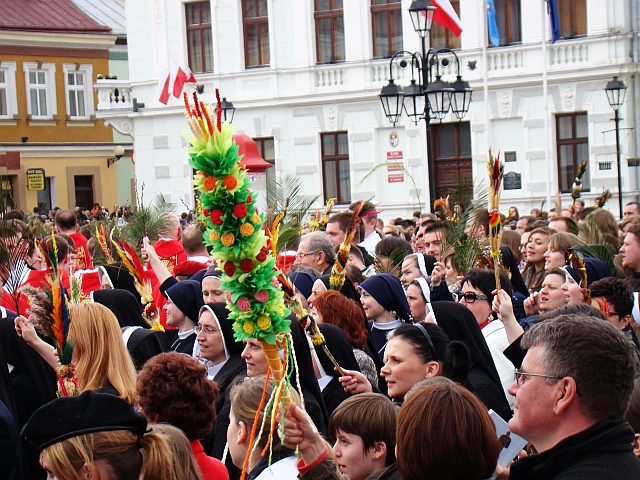
Palms carried on Palm Sunday, 2011, at Sanok, Poland

=== Palm Sunday ===
In Christianity, the palm branches distributed during Palm Sunday services originate in the triumphal entry of Christ into Jerusalem. Early Christians used the palm branch to symbolize the victory of the faithful over enemies of the soul, as the Palm Sunday festival celebrates the triumphal entry of Jesus into Jerusalem. Many churches of mainstream Christian denominations, including the Catholic, Lutheran, Methodist, Anglican, Moravian and Reformed traditions, distribute palm branches to their congregations during Palm Sunday services. Christians take these palms, which are often blessed by clergy, to their homes where they hang these alongside Christian art (especially crosses and crucifixes), or keep these in their Bibles, prayer books, and devotionals. In the period preceding the following Lent, known as Shrovetide, churches often place a basket in their narthex or outside collect the previous year’s palms, which are then ritually burned on Shrove Tuesday to make ashes for the following day, Ash Wednesday, marking the first day of Lent.

=== Martyr's palm ===
In Western Christian art, martyrs were often shown holding a palm frond as an attribute, representing the victory of spirit over flesh, and it was widely believed that a picture of a palm on a tomb meant that a martyr was buried there.

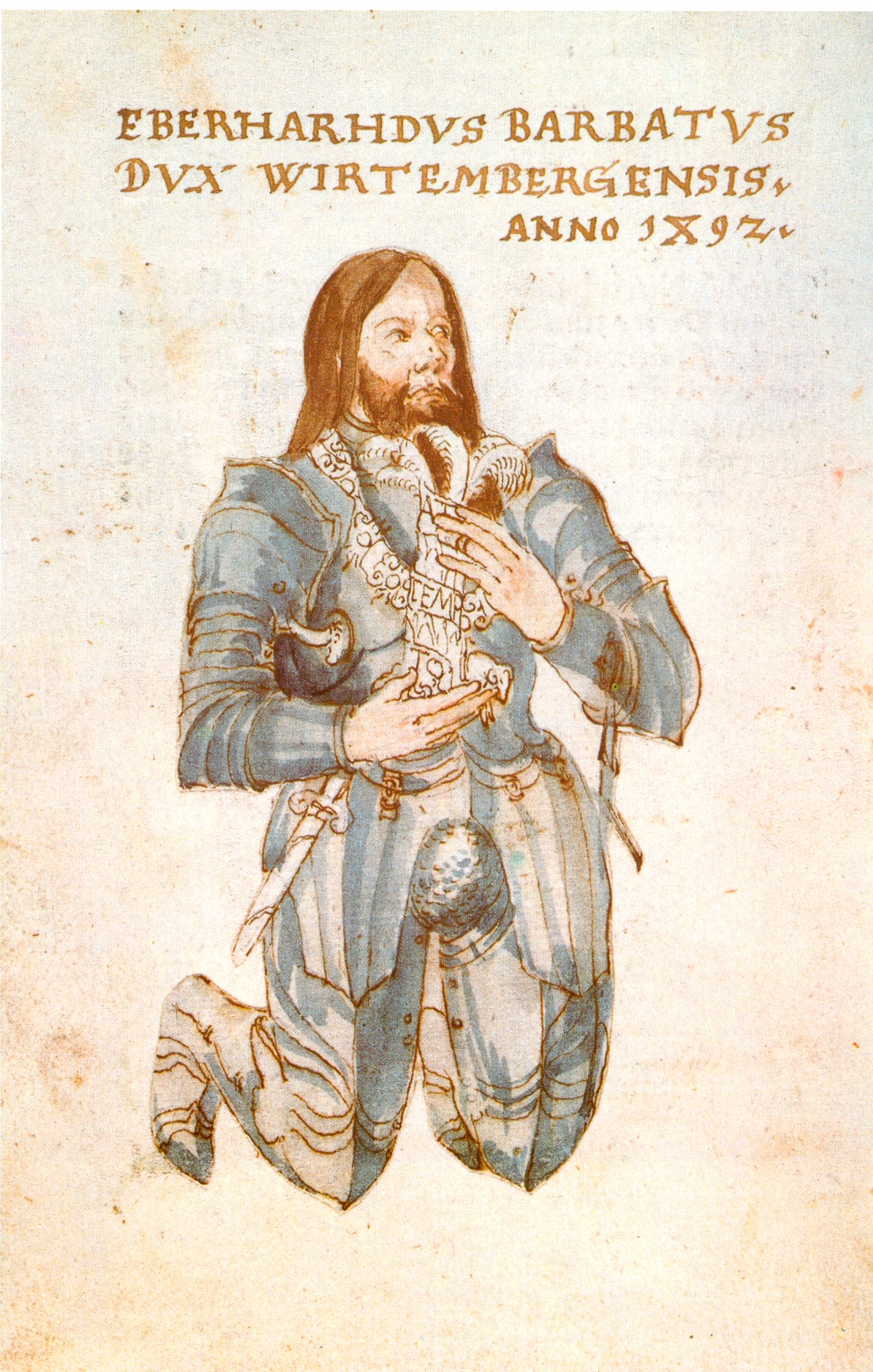
Eberhard I, Duke of Württemberg, holding a palm to commemorate his pilgrimage to Jerusalem in 1468, when he became a Knight of the Holy Sepulchre

Origen calls the palm (In Joan, XXXI) the symbol of victory in that war waged by the spirit against the flesh. In this sense it was especially applicable to martyrs, the victors par excellence over the spiritual foes of mankind; hence the frequent occurrence in the Acts of the Martyrs of such expressions as "he received the palm of martyrdom." On 10 April 1688, it was decided by the Congregation of Rites that the palm when found depicted on catacomb tombs was to be regarded as a proof that a martyr had been interred there. Subsequently, this opinion was acknowledged by Mabillon, Muratori, Benedict XIV and others to be untenable; further investigation showed that the palm was represented not only on tombs of the post-persecution era, but even on tombs of those who did not practice Christianity.

The general significance of the palm on early Christian monuments is slightly modified according to its association with other symbols (e.g., with a Christogram, the Ichthus (Fish), or the Good Shepherd). On some later monuments, the palm was represented merely as an ornament separating two scenes. Palms also represented heaven, evidenced by ancient art often depicting Jesus in heaven among palms.

In the Middle Ages, pilgrims to the Holy Land would bring back palms for deposit at their home churches. Crusaders would carry or wear an image of one, seen today in the Catholic Order of the Holy Sepulchre, which still awards a Palm of Jerusalem decoration. In addition, the Custody of the Holy Land, courtesy of the Catholic Church, bestows the Jerusalem Pilgrim's Cross on Catholic pilgrims to the city.

=== Martyrs bearing palms ===
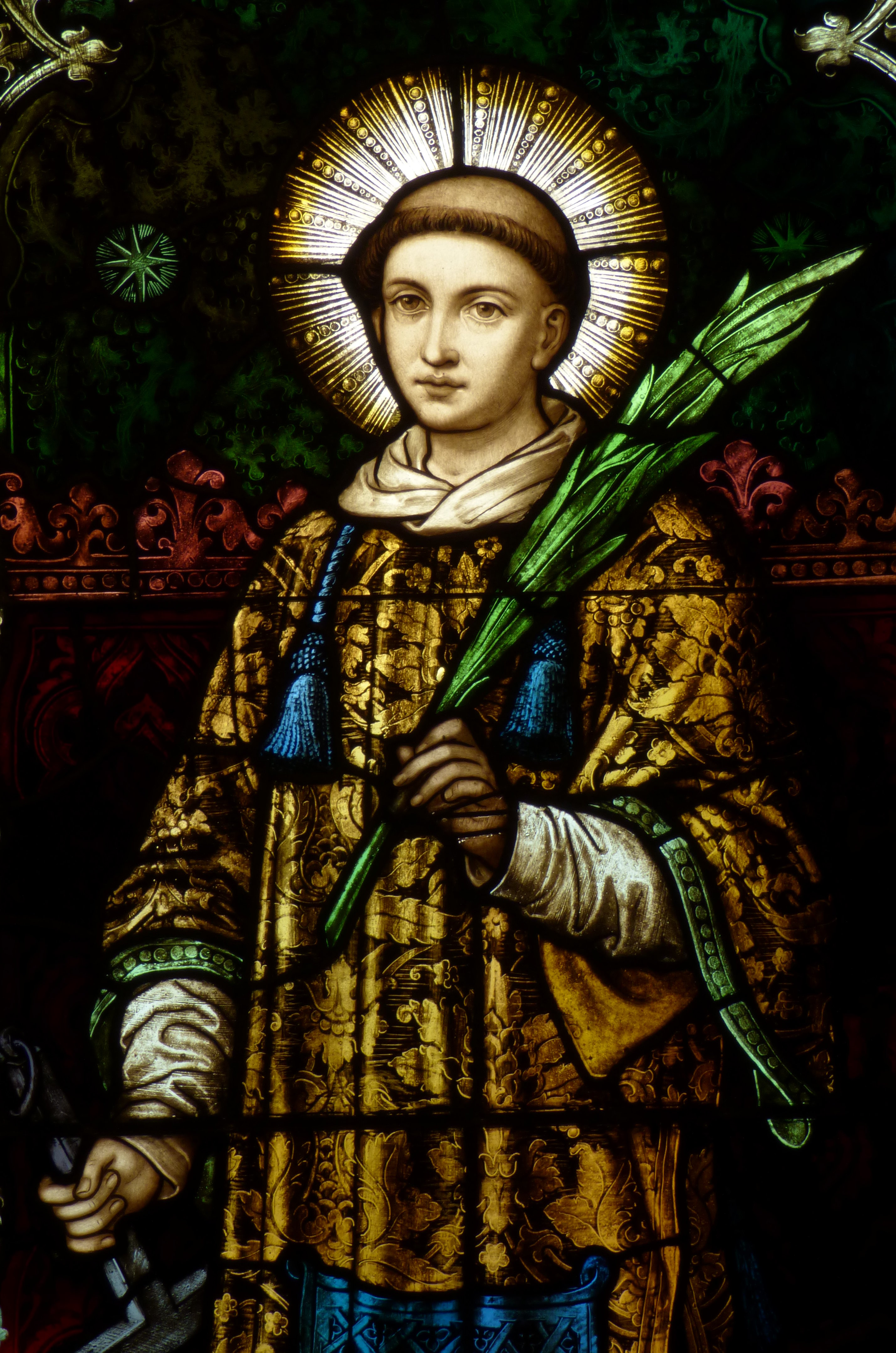
Saint Lawrence, holding a martyr's palm

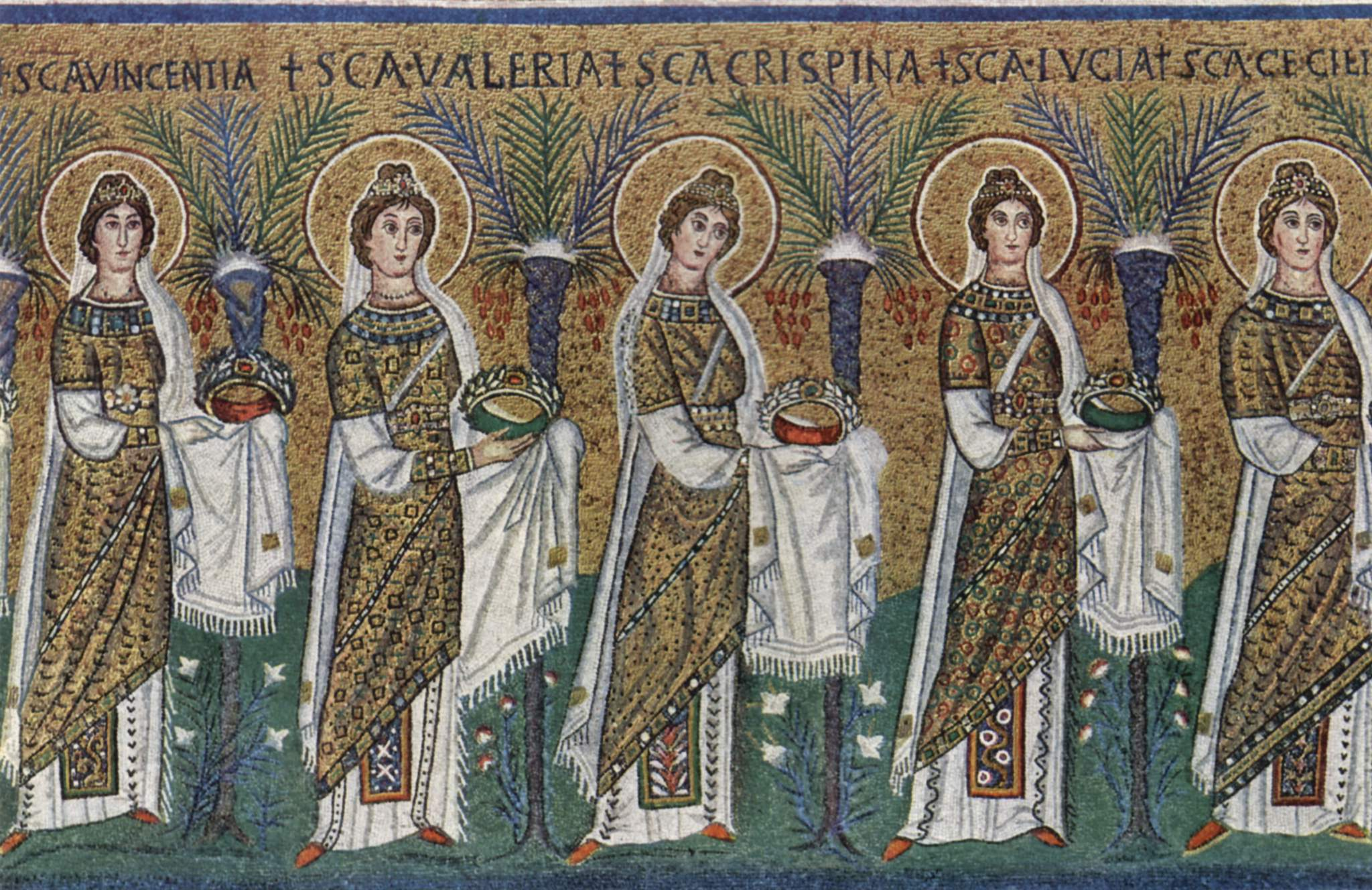
Procession of virgin martyrs bearing wreaths, with palms behind them (Basilica of Sant'Apollinare Nuovo in Ravenna, before 526 AD)

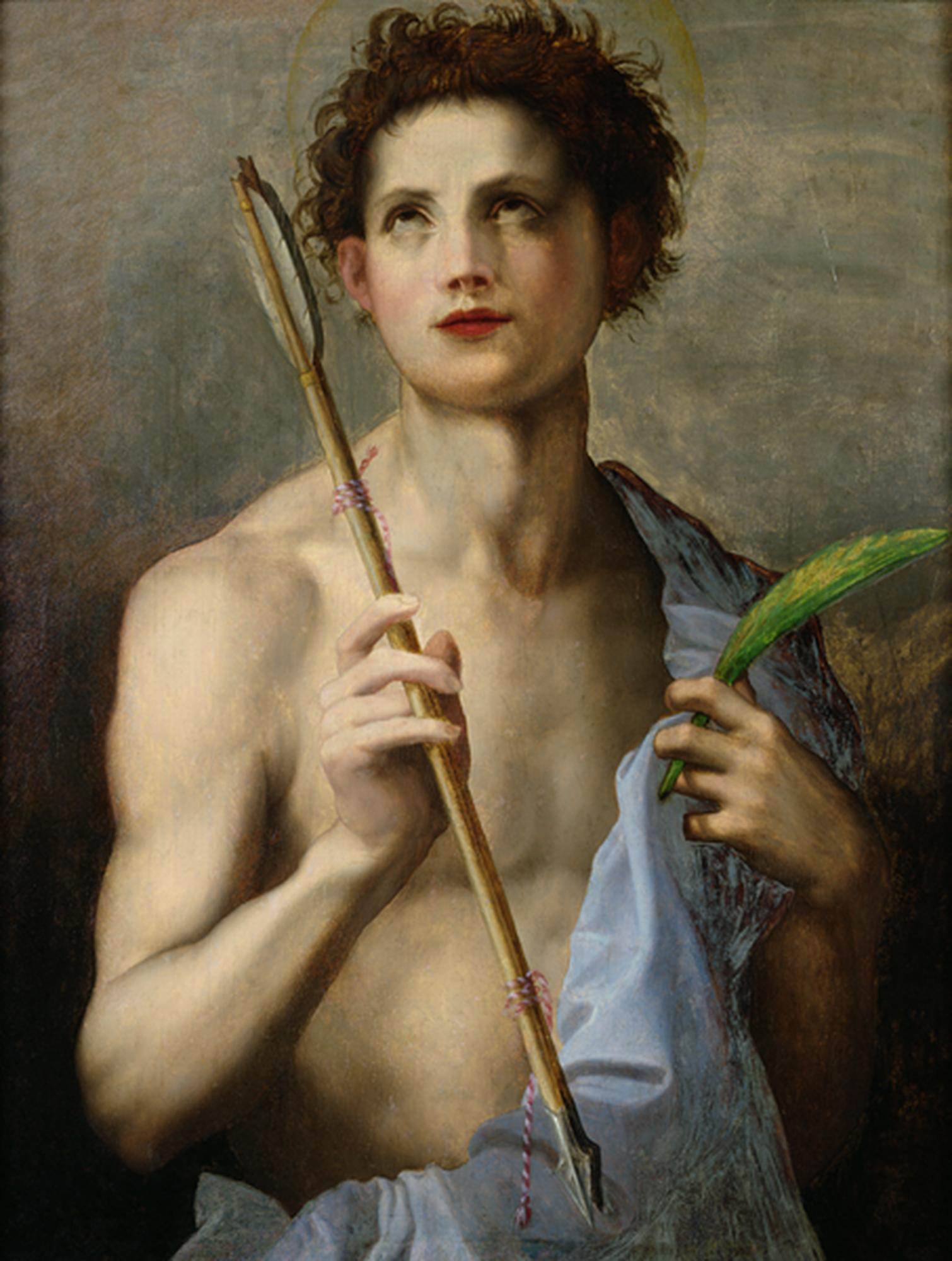
Saint Sebastian Holding Two Arrows and a Martyr's Palm by Andrea del Sarto (early 16th century)

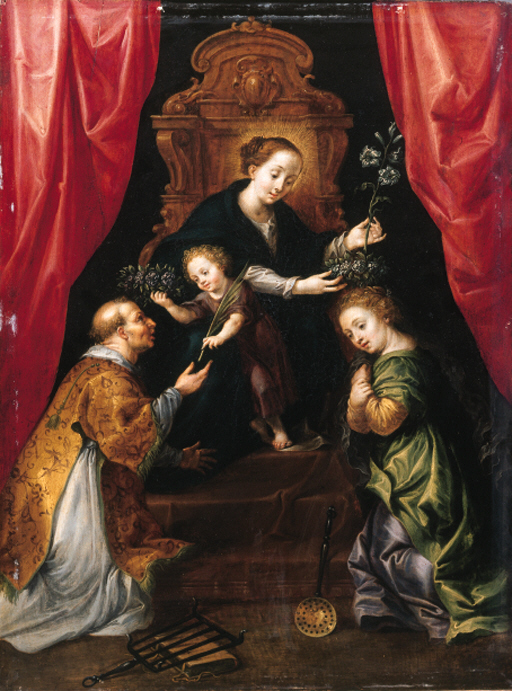
Saint Lawrence hands the Christ Child a palm branch (Maarten Pepyn, 1668)

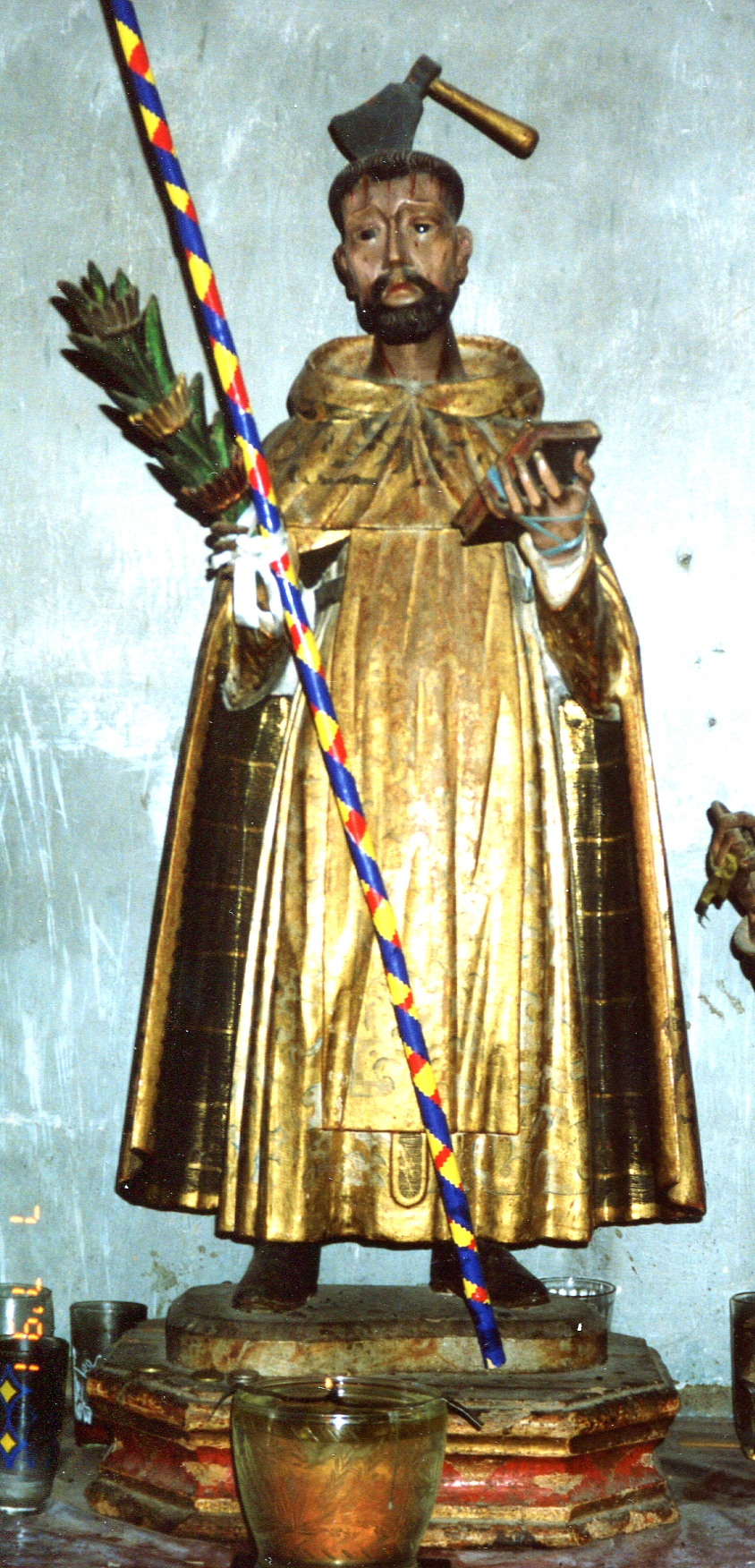
San Pedro Mártir, in the church of Santo Domingo Díaz Ordaz, Oaxaca, Mexico

== Islam ==
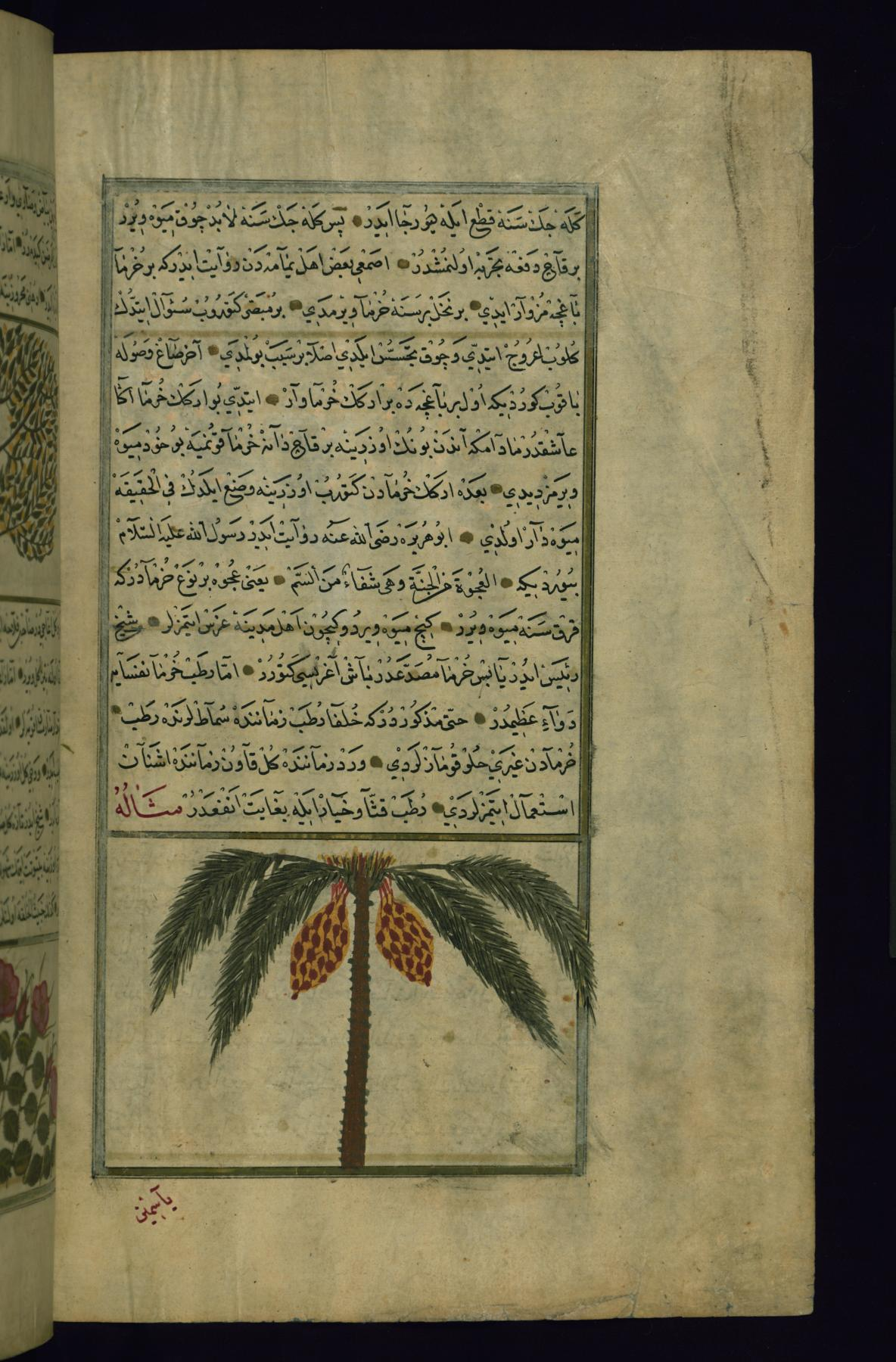
A Palm Tree (1717) by the Ottoman illustrator Muhammad ibn Muhammad Shakir Ruzmah-'i Nathani

The palm is richly significant in Islamic culture, and the palm symbolizes rest and hospitality in many cultures of the Middle East. The presence of palm trees around an oasis showed that water was the gift of Allah. In the Quran, the palm appears in the paradisical imagery of the Garden (Jannah). In one prophetic tradition, the Dome of the Rock will stand on a palm tree issuing from one of the rivers of Paradise. Muhammad is said to have built his home out of palm, to have leaned against a palm while speaking, and to have raised the first mosque as a roofed place with palm trees.

The first muezzin climbed palm trees to call the faithful to prayer, from which the minaret developed. In the Quran, Mary is said to have given birth to Jesus under a date palm.

In northern Sudan, the doum palm is the symbol of endurance (doum), particularly of the Muslim saint who gave his name to Wad Hamid. The palm also appears on several coins from Islamic states, for example the 1 Tunisian dinar issue honoring the Food and Agriculture Organization from 1970, and several Iraqi coins of the 1970s like the 5 fils.

== Modern usage ==
The Latin motto of Lord Nelson is Palmam qui meruit ferat, "Let him bear the palm who has deserved it". The motto has been adopted by numerous other organizations, including the University of Southern California.

Today, the palm, especially the coconut palm, is a symbol of a tropical island paradise. Palms appear on the flags and seals of several places where they are native, including those of Malta, Haiti, Paraguay, Guam, Florida, Poland, Australia and South Carolina.

The palm branch symbol is included in MUFI: ⸙ (2E19, 'Palm Branch' in Unicode).

In Arabic, the term Fog al-Nakhal (فوق النخل), which literally translates to "above the palm trees", is an idiom used to indicate euphoria, satisfaction or strong happiness.

=== Flags and seals ===
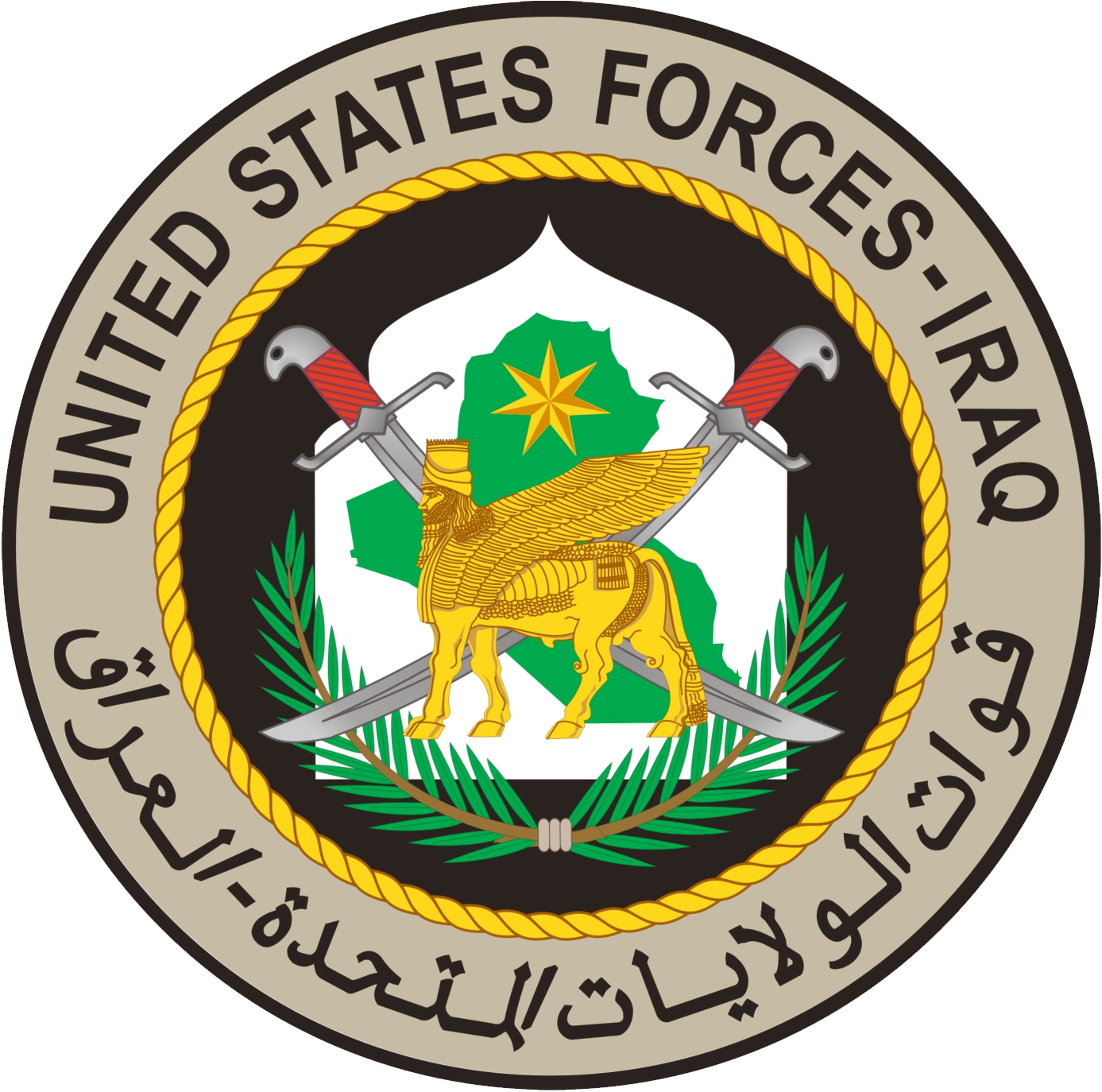
Combat patch for United States Forces – Iraq: the palm fronds are intended to represent peace and prosperity, below the Lamassu embodying Mesopotamian cultural heritage

Maltese coat of arms

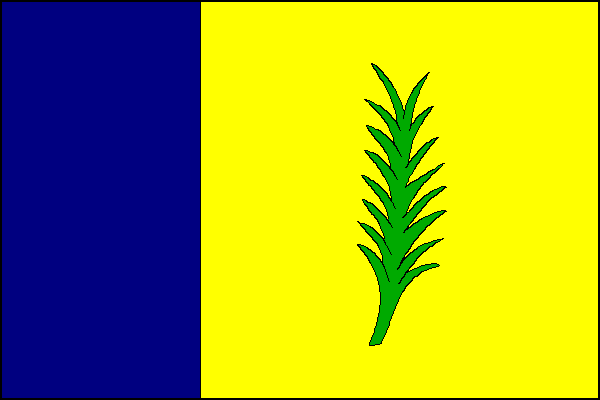
Village flag of Drnovice, Czech Republic

Coat of arms of Saint-Étienne, France

Coat of arms of Fiľakovo, Slovakia

=== Allegories of Victory and Peace ===
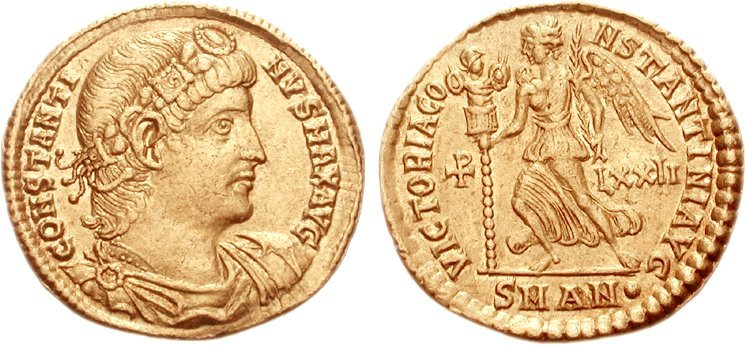
Solidus (335–336 AD) of Constantine I, the first Christian emperor, with Victory holding a palm and a military trophy next to a christogram

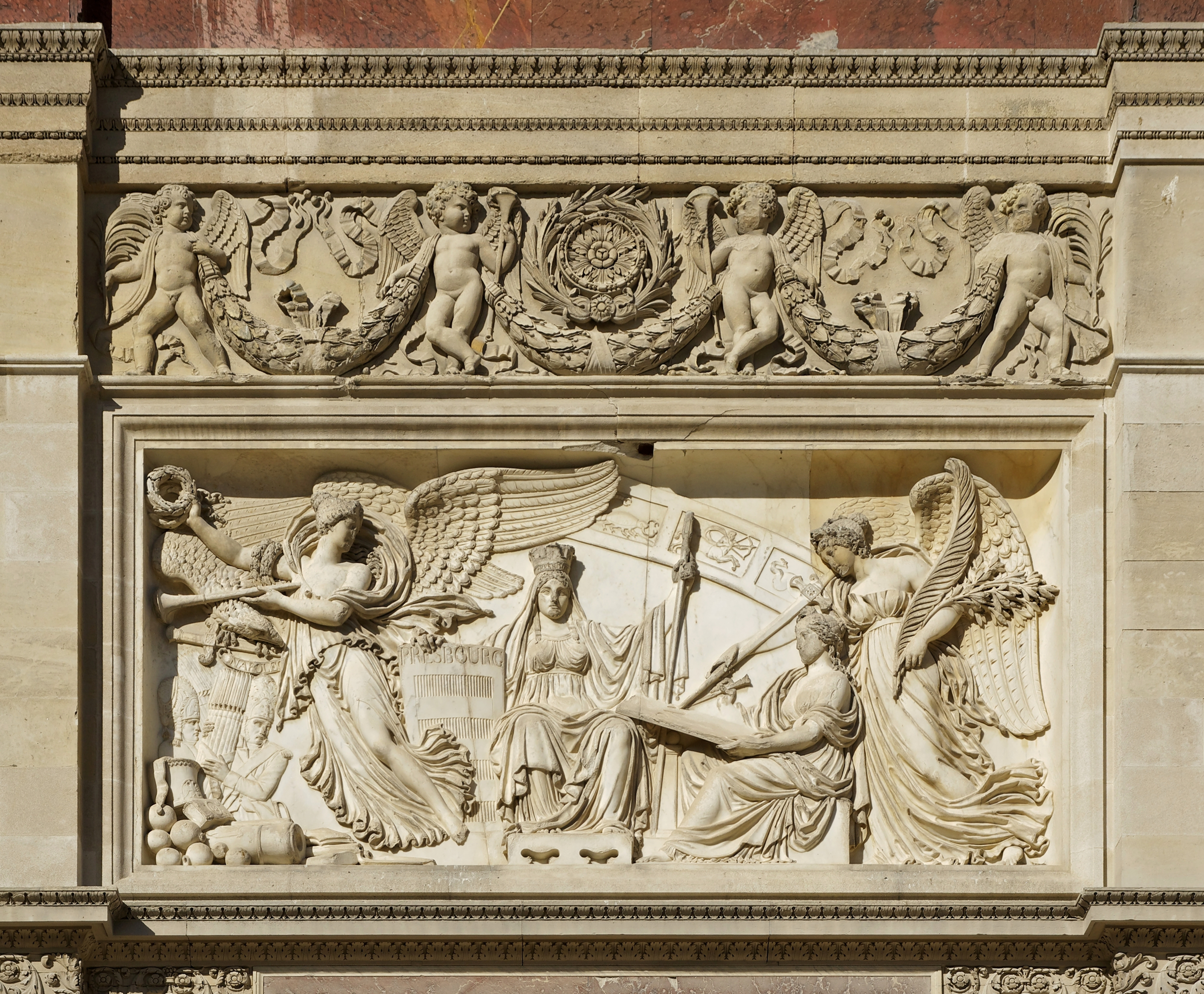
Allegory of the Peace of Pressburg (1805), with the figure on the right holding a palm, on the Arc de Triomphe du Carrousel

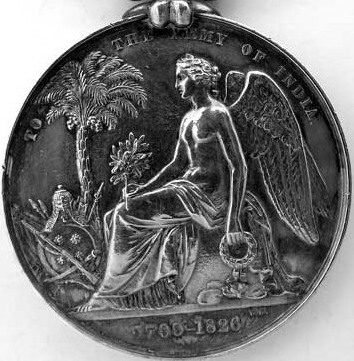
Army of India Medal (reverse), with palm tree in background, created 1851

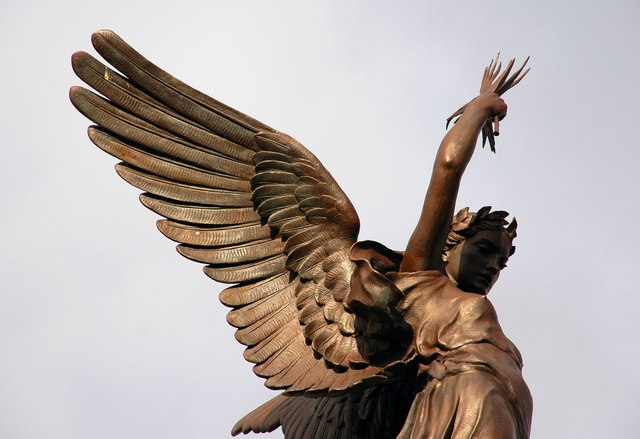
Victorious Peace holding a palm branch, World War I memorial, Lurgan, Northern Ireland
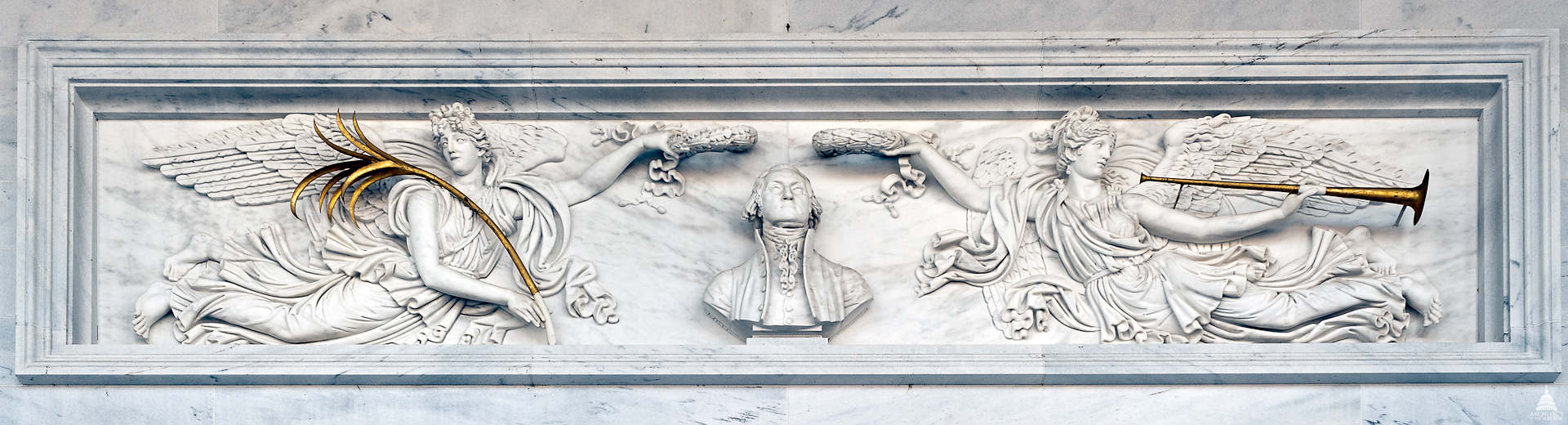
Bust of George Washington flanked by allegories of Peace holding a palm branch and Fame blowing a trumpet, marble relief (1959–60) by G. Gianetti, based on the 1827 sandstone original by Antonio Capellano, at the U.S. Capitol

== Bibliography ==
- Chase, Holly (1990). Harlan Walker (ed.). The Date Palm: Pillar of Society. Oxford Symposium on Food and Cookery 1989: Staples. Prospect Books. pp. 61–69. ISBN 9780907325444.
- Rustomji, Nerina (2009). The Garden and the Fire: Heaven and Hell in Islamic Culture. Columbia University Press. ISBN 978-0231140850.
- Vioque, Guillermo Galán (2002). Martial, Book VII: A Commentary. Translated by J.J. Zoltowski. Brill. ISBN 978-90-04-12338-0. "Livy 10.47.3"
