= Tayeb Salih International Award =

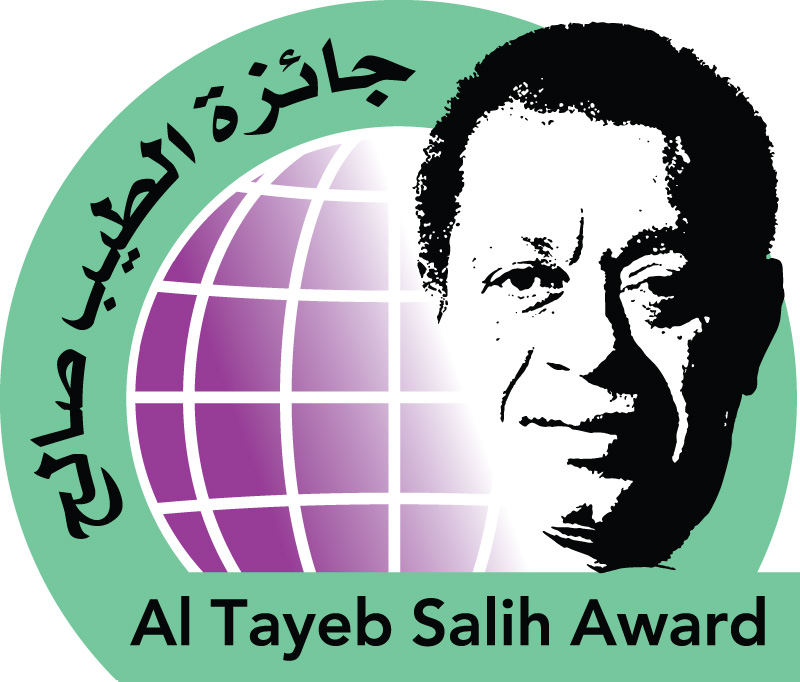

The Tayeb Salih International Award for Creative Writing (established in February 2010), is a Sudanese literary award aimed at all Arabic speakers in three fields: the short story, the novel, and a field determined annually by the Board of Trustees. In each category, $15,000 goes to the winner, $10,000 to the author in second place, and $8,000 to the author in third. The award is valued at 200,000 US dollars and was launched by the Sudanese mobile company (Zain), with the aim of promoting literature and arts in Sudan and the Arab world, and connecting generations with the Arab cultural heritage. The award is named in honor of the internationally renowned Sudanese writer Tayeb Salih, whose novel Season of Migration to the North was classified as one of the best one hundred Arabic works in history. In 2023, the award completed its thirteenth session.

== See also ==
- International Prize for Arabic Fiction
- Katara Prize for Arabic Novel
