= Denys Johnson-Davies =

Canadian translator

Denys Johnson-Davies (Arabic: دنيس جونسون ديڤيز) (also known as Abdul Wadud) was an eminent Arabic-to-English literary translator who translated, inter alia, several works by Nobel Prize-winning Egyptian author Naguib Mahfouz, Sudanese author Tayeb Salih, Palestinian poet Mahmud Darwish, and Syrian author Zakaria Tamer.

Johnson-Davies, referred to as "the leading Arabic-English translator of our time" by Edward Said, translated more than twenty-five volumes of short stories, novels, plays, and poetry, and was the first to translate the work of Nobel laureate Naguib Mahfouz. He was also interested in Islamic studies and was co-translator of three volumes of Prophetic Hadith. He wrote a number of children’s books adapted from traditional Arabic sources, including a collection of his own short stories, Fate of a Prisoner, which was published in 1999.

Born in 1922 in Vancouver, British Columbia, Canada of English parentage, Johnson-Davies spent his childhood in Sudan, Egypt, Uganda, and Kenya, and then was sent to England at age 12. Johnson-Davies studied Oriental languages at St Catharine's College, Cambridge, and lectured on translation and English literature at several universities across the Arab World.

In 2006, he published his memoirs. In 2007, he was awarded the Sheikh Zayed Book Award "Cultural Personality of the Year", valued at about $300,000.

In his latter years he lived between Marrakesh and Cairo.

Denys Johnson-Davies died in Egypt on 22 May 2017.

== Bibliography ==
Selected Translations

- The Wedding of Zein and Other Stories by Tayeb Salih and illustrated by Ibrahim Salahi, 1968, Heinemann African Writers Series
- Season of Migration to the North by Tayeb Salih, 1969, Heinemann African Writers Series
- The Smell of It & Other Stories by Sonallah Ibrahim, 1971, Heinemann African Writers Series
- Fate of a Cockroach and Other Plays by Tawfiq al-Hakim, 1973, Heinemann Arab Authors Series
- The Music of Human Flesh, by Mahmoud Darwish, 1980, Heinemann Arab Authors Series
- Distant View of a Minaret by Alifa Rifaat, 1983, Quartet Books
- Tigers on the Tenth Day and Other Stories by Zakaria Tamer, 1985, Quartet Books
- The Slave's Dream and Other Stories by Nabil Naoum Gorgy, 1991, Quartet Books
- The Time and the Place by Naguib Mahfouz, 1992, American University in Cairo Press
- The Wiles of Men and Other Stories by Salwa Bakr, 1992, Quartet Books
- A Last Glass of Tea and Other Stories by Mohamed el-Bisatie, 1994, Three Continents Press
- Bandarshah by Tayeb Salih, 1996, Routledge Books & Keegan Paul International
- Houses Behind the Trees by Mohamed el-Bisatie, 1997, American University in Cairo Press
- The Hill of Gypsies and Other Stories by Said Al–kafrawi, 1999, American University in Cairo Press
- Final Nights by Buthaina Al-Nasiri, 2008, American University in Cairo Press
- Hunger by Mohamed el-Bisatie, 2008, American University in Cairo Press

Anthologies

- Modern Arabic Short Stories, selected and translated by Denys Johnson-Davies, 1976, Heinemann Arab Authors Series
- Egyptian One-Act Plays, selected, edited and translated by Denys Johnson-Davies, 1976, Heinemann Arab Authors Series featuring plays by Tawfiq al-Hakim, Alfred Farag, Farid Kamal, Ali Salem and Abdel-Moneim Selim
- Egyptian Short Stories, selected, edited and translated by Denys Johnson-Davies, 1978, Three Continent Press including "House of Flesh" by Yusuf Idris, "Grandad Hasan" by Yahya Taher Abdullah, "Within The Walls" by Edwar El-Kharrat, "The Performer" by Ibrahim Aslan, "The Whistle" by Abdul Hakim Kassem, "Suddenly It Rained" by Bahaa Taher, "The Man Who Saw The Sole Of His Left Foot In A Cracked Mirror" by Lutfi Al-Khouli, "A Conversation From The Third Floor" by Mohamed El-Bisatie, "Yusuf Murad Morcos" by Nabil Gorgy, "The Conjurer Made Off With The Dish" by Naguib Mahfouz, "The Accusation" by Suleiman Fayyad, "A Place Under The Dome" by Abdul Rahman Fahmy, "The Country Boy" by Yusuf Sibai, "The Snake" by Sonallah Ibrahim, "The Crush Of Life" by Yusuf Sharouni, "A Story From Prison" by Yahya Haqqi and "The Child And The King" by Gamil Atia Ibrahim.
- Under the Naked Sky: Short Stories from the Arab World, edited by Denys Johnson-Davies, 2001, American University in Cairo Press Modern Arabic Writing
- The AUC Press Book of Modern Arabic Literature, edited by Denys Johnson-Davies, 2006, American University in Cairo Press
- The Essential Naguib Mahfouz: Novels, Short Stories, Autobiography, edited by Denys Johnson-Davies, 2011, American University in Cairo Press
