= Hunger (el-Bisatie novel) =

Book by Mohamed el-Bisatie

- Author: Mohammed el-Bisatie
- Language: Arabic
- Genre: Novel
- Publisher: Dar Al-Adab for publishing and distribution
- Publication date: 2007
- Pages: 135

Hunger (Arabic: جوع) is the 13th novel by Egyptian writer Mohammed el-Bisatie. The novel was published in 2007 by Dar Al-adab in Lebanon. The novel has been translated into French, German and English. It was short-listed as a finalist for the 2009 International Prize for Arabic Fiction.

== Overview ==
The novel is about the Egyptian countryside and villages that suffer from poverty, hunger and disease. el-Bisatie shows a clear picture of suffering and poor environment, which encourages the spread of ignorance and superstition. This novel does not only focus on hunger in material terms, but also includes moral hunger.
