= Mohamed el-Bisatie =

Egyptian writer (1937–2012)

Mohamed el-Bisatie (Arabic: محمد البساطي; November 1937 – 14 July 2012) was an Egyptian novelist and short story writer.

== Life ==
He was born in el-Gamalia, Dakahlia Governorate, overlooking the shores of Lake Manzalah in the Nile Delta. He graduated from Cairo University in 1960 and then entered government service. He continued his career as a civil servant until his retirement a few years ago.

== Career ==
El-Bisatie started writing in the early 1960s and published many stories in leading journals such as al-Masa', al-Katib and al-Majalla. He is considered to be part of the Egyptian literary movement that was spearheaded by the avant-garde magazine Gallery 68. His first book, a collection of stories called Al-kibar wa al-sighar was published in 1967–68. Since then, he has published more than a dozen works of fiction, including novels and short story collections.

Six of his books are available in English translation. His work has also been translated into Italian, French, German and Spanish. Noted Arabic translators such as Denys Johnson-Davies and Hartmut Fahndrich have translated el-Bisatie's fiction, into English and German respectively.

== Awards and honours ==
El-Bisatie has won a number of awards in his illustrious career, including the Al Owais Prize in 2001 and the Sawiris Prize in 2008. His novel Hunger was shortlisted for the 2009 International Prize for Arabic Fiction.

== Selected works ==
Short story collections

- Al-kibar wa al-sighar (1967)
- Hadith min al-tabik al-thalith wa kissas ukhra (1970)
- Ahlam rijal kissar al-‘umr (1979)
- Hatha ma kan (1988)
- Munhana al-nahr (1992)
- Daw' da'if la yakshuf shya'an (1993)
- Sa'at maghreb (1996)

Novels

- Al-Tajir wa-l-Naqqash (1976)
- Al-Maqha al-Zujaji (1979)
- Al-Ayyam al-Sa'aba (1979)
- Beyout Wara' al-Ashgar (1993)
- Sakhb al-Buhaira (1994)
- Thakafa Gamahiriyya (1997)
- Dar el-Maghreby (1999)
- Aswat el-Leil (1998)
- Wa Ya'ati al-Kitar (1999)
- Layal Ukhra (2000)
- Fardous (2003)

In English translation

- A Last Glass of Tea and Other Stories - short stories, translated by Denys Johnson-Davies (Three Continents Press, 1994)
- Houses Behind the Trees - novel, trans. Denys Johnson-Davies (AUC Press, 1997)
- Clamor of the Lake - novel, trans. Hala Halim (AUC Press, 2004)
- Over the Bridge - novel, trans. Nancy Roberts (AUC Press, 2006)
- Hunger - novel, trans. Denys Johnson-Davies (AUC Press, 2008)
- Drumbeat - novel, trans. Peter Daniel (AUC Press, 2010)
