= Wad Hamid =

Wad Hamid ود حامد
- Location in Sudan
- Coordinates: 16°29′26″N 32°48′24″E
- Country: Sudan
- State: River Nile

Wad Hamid (Arabic: ود حامد) is a city on the Nile about 100 kilometres north of Khartoum, Sudan.

== In Media ==
Tayeb Salih's book, Season of Migration to the North, is set in the village of Wad Hamid.
