= Season of Migration to the North =

1966 novel by Tayeb Salih

- Front cover of Heinemann edition of the novel
- Author: Tayeb Salih
- Original title: موسم الهجرة إلى الشمال; Mawsim al-Hiǧra ilā ash-Shamāl.
- Translator: Denys Johnson-Davies
- Language: Arabic
- Publication date: 1966
- Publication place: Sudan
- Media type: Print (Hardcover and Paperback)
- Pages: 169 pp (Heinemann edition)
- ISBN: 0-435-90630-5

Season of Migration to the North (Arabic: موسم الهجرة إلى الشمال Mawsim al-Hijrah ilâ al-Shamâl) is a novel by the Sudanese writer Tayeb Salih, first published serially in the Beirut journal Hiwâr in 1966. It became Salih's best known work and is considered a classic of postcolonial literature. The main concern of the novel is the impact of British colonialism and European modernity on rural African societies in general and Sudanese culture and identity in particular. The novel reflects the conflicts of modern Sudan and depicts the brutal history of European colonialism as shaping the reality of contemporary Sudanese society. Damascus-based Arab Literary Academy named it one of the best novels in Arabic of the 20th century. Mawsim al-Hijrah ilâ al-Shamâl is considered to be an important turning point in the development of postcolonial narratives that focus on the encounter between East and West.

The novel has been translated into over twenty languages. Salih was fluent in both English and Arabic, but chose to pen this novel in Arabic. The English translation by Denys Johnson-Davies was published in 1969 as part of the influential Heinemann African Writers Series. The novel is a counternarrative to Heart of Darkness. It was described by Edward Said as one of the six great novels in Arabic literature. In 2001, it was selected by a panel of Arab writers and critics as the most important Arab novel of the 20th century.

== Plot ==
Mawsim al-Hijrah ilâ al-Shamâl is the story of the “traveled man,” the African who has returned from schooling abroad, told to an unspecified audience by an unnamed narrator. The narrator returns to his Sudanese village of Wad Hamid on the Nile in the 1950s after writing a doctoral thesis on ‘the life of an obscure English poet.' Mustafa Sa'eed, the main protagonist of the novel, is a child of British colonialism, and a fruit of colonial education. He is also a monstrous product of his time.

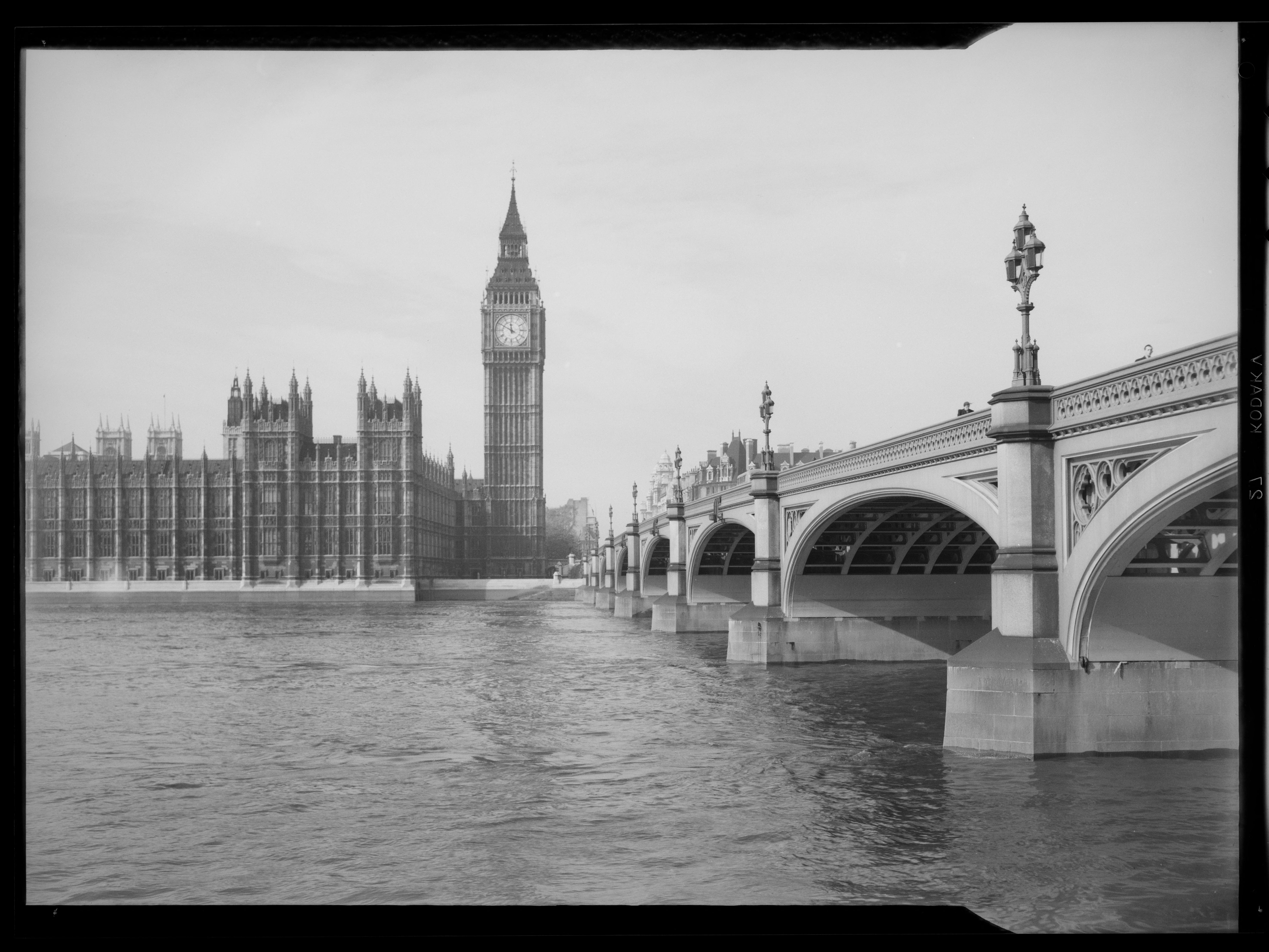
London in the 1920s, where Mustafa Saeed studied

The unnamed narrator is eager to make a contribution to the new postcolonial life of his country. On his arrival home, the narrator encounters a new villager named Mustafa Sa'eed who exhibits none of the adulation for his achievements that most others do, and he displays an antagonistically aloof nature. Mustafa betrays his past one drunken evening by wistfully reciting poetry in fluent English, leaving the narrator resolute to discover the stranger's identity. The narrator later asks Mustafa about his past, and Mustafa tells him much of his story, often saying "I am no Othello, Othello was a lie," as well as "I am a lie."

The narrator becomes fascinated by Mustafa, and learns that Mustafa was also a precocious student educated in the West but that he held a violent, hateful and complex relationship with his western identity and acquaintances. The story of Mustafa's troubled past in Europe, and in particular his love affairs with British women, form the center of the novel. Mustafa attracts the women by appealing to their Orientalist fantasies, and all of these relationships end in tragedy. Three of the women commit suicide and the fourth, Mustafa's wife, is murdered by him. He stands trial for the murder and serves time in an English jail.

In the dramatic present, Mustafa drowns in the Nile, and his widow, Hosna, is pressured to remarry. She refuses, because she does not want to marry after her husband. She tries to appeal to the narrator, who was appointed the guardian of her sons in Mustafa's will. The narrator does try to foil the marriage, before it can take place, but he spends most of his time in Khartoum and therefore cannot exert much influence on the village. Hosna is married to Wad Rayyes against her will, and when he attempts to forcefully consummate the marriage, she kills him first and then proceeds to kill herself. Both are then buried without a funeral.

The stories of Mustafa's past life in England and the repercussions on the village around him, take their toll on the narrator, who is driven to the edge of sanity. In the final chapter, the narrator is floating in the Nile, precariously between life and death, and resolves to rid himself of Mustafa's lingering presence, and to stand as an influential individual in his own right. In the middle of the Nile, he yells, "Help! Help!". His desire to live is nothing but a clinging to hope despite all the struggles and crises he has endured. The novel ends upon that cry, and it is unclear whether his decision is too late, whether it is the right one, and whether he, others, and the country itself will receive the help needed.

== Background ==
In January 1899, a condominium, or joint-authority, was established to rule over Sudan by Britain and Egypt. Sudan gained independence in 1956, but was then engulfed in two prolonged civil wars for much of the remainder of the 20th century. This novel is set in the 1960s, a significant and tumultuous time in Sudan's history. Tayeb Salih wrote his novel Season of Migration to the North in the mid-1960s. Some sources indicate that he began writing it during a vacation in southern France in 1962, then stopped for four years before later completing it. This was in contrast to his successful novel The Wedding of Zein, which he wrote in three months in the late 1950s. The novel was first published in serialized form in the magazine Hiwar, which was issued in Beirut (and later moved to Doha). Critic Raja'a Al-Naqqash invited the author to publish it as a serial in the magazine in 1966. The novel appeared in issues 5 and 6 of Hiwar (September 1966), then was collected into a book and released by Dar al-Awda in Beirut that same year. Later, Dar al-Hilal in Cairo republished it in the Hilal Novels series. The novel attracted the attention of readers and critics from its first release, and was soon translated into English in 1969 by the translator Denys Johnson-Davies. The English translation was celebrated in London, and was praised by British newspapers at the time, with The Sunday Times naming it the novel of the year. This was followed by translations into many languages (it is said to have exceeded 21 languages), which contributed to the worldwide spread of the novel's reputation. In The Guardian's obituary for Tayeb Salih in 2009, the paper noted that "the novel was translated into more than thirty languages".

== Relation to other texts ==
It has been compared in many ways to Joseph Conrad's Heart of Darkness. Both novels explore cultural hybridity, cross-colonial experiences, and Orientalism.

The novel is also set in the same village, Wad Hamid, as some of Salih's other works, including The Wedding of Zein, Bandarshah, and others. Many of the novel's characters, such as Mahjoub and the narrator, recur in these other works as well. Thus, Ami Elad-Boulaski writes that Salih's depiction of Wad Hamid is more fully realized because a reader can track the development of characters throughout multiple novels and short stories.

== Controversy ==
Season of Migration to the North was initially published in 1966, in serialized form, by Hiwar, a Beirut-based literary magazine that was covertly established and funded by the CIA.

The novel was banned in the author's native Sudan for a period of time starting in 1983 because its graphic sexual imagery offended the Islamic government. Today the novel is readily available in Sudan.

== Theater ==
- Season of Migration to the North, adapted and directed by Ouriel Zohar, starring Mohammad Bakri. Bakri won the award for best actor in the 1993 Acco Festival of Alternative Israeli Theatre.

== Editions in print ==
- ISBN 0-435-90630-5 Season of Migration to the North, 1969 Heinemann
- ISBN 0-935576-29-0 Season of Migration to the North (hardcover), 1989 M. Kesend Pub. Ltd.
- ISBN 0-435-90066-8 Season of Migration to the North (paperback), 1970 Heinemann
- ISBN 0-89410-199-4 Season of Migration to the North: A novel (paperback reprint), 1980 Lynne Rienner Publishers
- ISBN 0-14-118720-4 Season of Migration to the North, 2003 Penguin Classics Series
- ISBN 978-159017-302-2 Season of Migration to the North, 2009 New York Review Books, Introduction by Laila Lalami
- ISBN 978-9953-970-02-8 Season of Migration to the North, 2017 Dongola Limited Editions Publishing, Artist's book limited edition of 30, 10 original etchings by Mohammad Omar Khalil
