= Tayeb Salih =

Sudanese novelist and short story writer (1929–2009)

al-Tayeb Salih
- الطيب محمد صالح أحمد
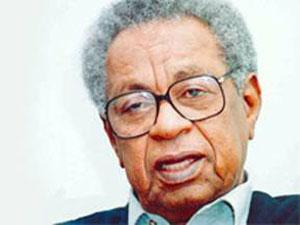
- Tayeb Salih in London, circa 2000
- Born: Al-Tayeb Mohammed Salih Ahmed; July 12, 1929; Karmakol, Northern State, Sudan
- Died: February 18, 2009 (aged 79); London, United Kingdom
- Education: University of Khartoum, University of London
- Occupations: Novelist, short story writer, journalist
- Spouse: Julia Maclean (m. 1965–2009)
- Children: 3 (Zeinab, Samira, Sarah)
- Writing career
- Language: Arabic
- Years active: 1953–2009
- Period: 1953–2009
- Genres: Novel, short story, essay
- Subjects: Postmodernism, Identity, Postcolonialism, cultural conflict, Sudanese village life
- Notable works: The Wedding of Zein (1962); Season of Migration to the North (1966)
- Notable awards: Cairo International Book Fair Award for Creativity in the Novel (2005); Tayeb Salih International Award for Creative Writing (named in his honor after his death)
- Movement: Modern Arabic literature

Al-Tayeb Salih (Arabic: الطيب صالح, romanized: aṭ-Ṭayyib Ṣāliḥ; July 12, 1929 – February 18, 2009) was a Sudanese writer, novelist, and journalist, considered to be one of the most prominent Arab writers of the 20th century. Through his captivating narrative style and profound themes, Salih etched his name alongside literary giants such as Gibran Khalil Gibran, Taha Hussein, and Naguib Mahfouz, earning the title of "the genius of the Arabic novel" by many critics. His writings are renowned for their creative portrayal of the clash between East and West, and for presenting Sudanese identity in its finest literary form.

Salih became known for his works that depicted the cultural and civilizational collision between the East and the West. He turned his small Sudanese village into a universal symbol representing issues of identity, alienation, and cultural conflict. His novel Season of Migration to the North (1966) is considered to be one of the most significant works in modern Arabic literature. The novel gained global recognition and has been translated into multiple languages, and has been studied in universities worldwide.

Tayeb Salih spent his life between the East and the West, living in Britain, Qatar, and France, and worked for esteemed media and cultural institutions such as the British Broadcasting Corporation (BBC) and the UNESCO organization. Throughout his diverse career in literature, media, and education, Salih played a crucial role in bringing the voice of Sudan to the world.

== Biography ==
Born in Karmakol, a village on the Nile near Al Dabbah, Sudan, in the Northern Province of Sudan, he graduated from University of Khartoum with a Bachelor of Science, before leaving for the University of London in the United Kingdom. Coming from a background of small farmers and religious teachers, his original intention was to work in agriculture. However, excluding a brief spell as a schoolmaster before moving to England, he worked in journalism and the promotion of international cultural exchange.

For more than ten years, Salih wrote a weekly column for the London-based Arabic language newspaper al Majalla, in which he explored various literary themes. He worked for the BBC's Arabic Service and later became director general of the Ministry of Information in Doha, Qatar. The last ten years of his working career, he spent at UNESCO headquarters in Paris, where he held various posts and was UNESCO's representative for the Arab states of the Persian Gulf.

== Literary career ==
Salih's writing draws important inspiration from his youth in a Sudanese village; life that is centered on rural people and their complex relationships. "At various levels and with varying degrees of psychoanalytic emphasis, he deals with themes of reality and illusion, the cultural dissonance between the West and the exotic Orient, the harmony and conflict of brotherhood, and the individual's responsibility to find a fusion between his or her contradictions." Furthermore, the motifs of his books are derived from his religious experience as a Muslim in 20th-century Sudan, both pre- and post-colonial. Another, more general subject of Salih's writing is the confrontation of the Arab Muslim and the Western European world.

In 1966, Salih published his novel Mawsim al-Hijrah ilâ al-Shimâl (Season of Migration to the North), for which he is best known. It was first published in the Beirut journal Hiwâr. The main concern of the novel is with the impact of British colonialism and European modernity on rural African societies in general, and on Sudanese culture and identity in particular. His novel reflects the conflicts of modern Sudan and depicts the brutal history of European colonialism as shaping the reality of contemporary Sudanese society. Season of Migration to the North is a story told to an unspecified audience by the unnamed narrator, a “traveled man” and an African who has returned after having spent years abroad. He returns to his Sudanese village of Wad Hamid on the Nile in the 1950s after having written a PhD thesis on ‘the life of an obscure English poet’. Mustafa Sa'eed, the main protagonist of the novel, is a child of British colonialism, and a fruit of colonial education.

In his essay "The New Novel in Sudan", published in Banipal magazine's issue of spring 1966 on Sudanese Literature today, Sudanese writer Emad Blake remarked that Salih "confronted the crucial issues of his time, such as the clash of Eastern and Western civilizations, as well as boldly employing sex and a style of writing we might term the 'impossible easy'."

The Damascus-based Arab Literary Academy named it one of the best novels in Arabic of the twentieth century. Upon its publication, it was banned in Salih's native Sudan for several years, because of its partly sexual content and despite the fact that it won him prominence and international fame.

"ʿUrs al-Zayn" (published in English as The Wedding of Zein) is a novella, published in 1966, centering on the unlikely nuptials of the town eccentric Zein. Tall and odd-looking, with just two teeth in his mouth, Zein has made a reputation for himself as the man who falls in love over and over with girls who promptly marry other men, – to the point where mothers seek him out in hopes that he will draw the eye of available suitors to their eligible daughters. "The Wedding of Zein" was made into a drama in Libya and won Kuwaiti filmmaker Khalid Siddiq an award at the Cannes Film Festival in the late 1970s.

In his reflections on Salih's literary style, his translator Denys Johnson-Davies wrote that Salih "exploited to the full the richness of the literary language in his narrative and uses the vivid local dialect for his dialog. [...] Tayeb Salih’s work shows his wide reading in the byways of Arabic literature, including poetry, which has helped to fashion a style which is direct and fluent, a style which an Arab critic has described as being closer to dramatic writing than that of the novel."

== Awards in honour of Tayeb Salih ==
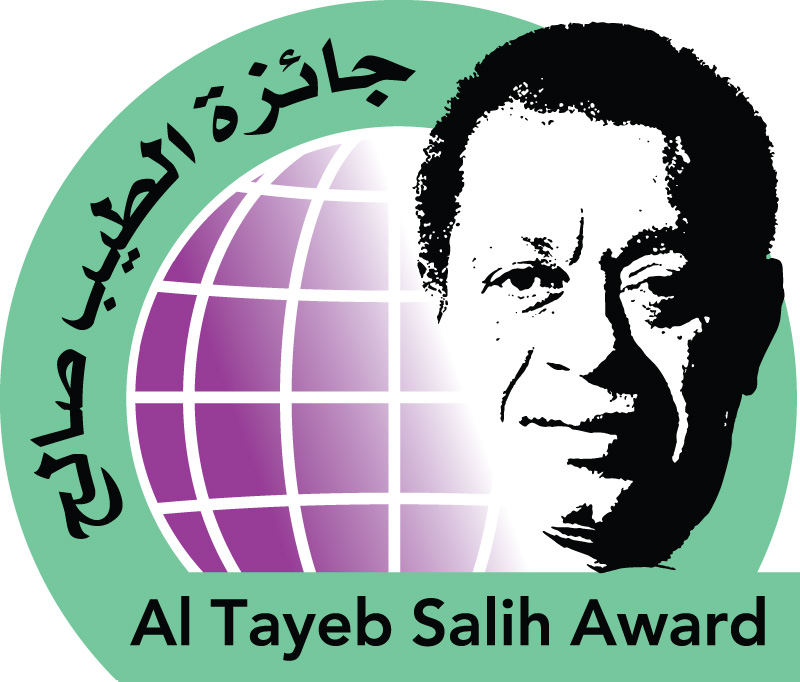
Logo of the al-Tayeb Salih Award for Creative Writing

In 1998, a group of Salih's friends formed a committee to honour him, and collected $20,000 for his personal use. He chose to use the money to establish the Tayeb Salih Creative Writing Award.

Awarded since 2002, the al-Tayeb Salih Prize for Literary Creativity is a literary prize for Sudanese novels, presented by the Abdel Karim Mirghani Cultural Center in Omdurman, and is dedicated to first novels by emerging Sudanese writers.

Since 2010, another award, called the Tayeb Salih International Award, has been granted to outstanding modern Arab writers in the fields of novel, short story, and critical studies. The award has been sponsored by telecommunications company Zain Sudan and has been critically seen by some Sudanese intellectuals, calling it “an attempt to control the Sudanese cultural scene” by the Ministry of Culture.

== Bibliography ==
- "A Date Palm by the Stream" (نخلة على الجدول [Nakhla 'ala al-jadwal]) (1953)
- "The Doum Tree of Wad Hamid", trans. Denys Johnson-Davies (1962) (دومة ود حامد [Douma wad Hamid]) (1960)
- "A Handful of Dates", trans. Denys Johnson-Davies (1966) (حفنة تمر [Hafna tamar]) (1964)
- The Wedding of Zein, trans. Denys Johnson-Davies (1968) (عرس الزين [Urs al-Zayn]) (1966)
- Season of Migration to the North, trans. Denys Johnson-Davies (1969) (موسم الهجرة إلى الشمال [Mawsim al-Hijra ila ash-Shamal]) (1966)
- Bandarshah (ضو البيت (بندر شاه) [Dau al-Beit: Bandarshah]) (1971)
- "The Cypriot Man", trans. Denys Johnson-Davies (1980) (Al-Rajul al Qubrosi) (1973, revised 1976)
- Meryoud: The Second Part of Bandarshah (مريود (الجزء الثاني من بندر شاه)) (1976)
- Complete Works (الأعمال الكاملة [al-Aʻmāl al-kāmilah]) (1984)
- Mansi: A Rare Man in His Own Way, trans. Adil Babikir (2020) (منسي إنسان نادر على طريقته) (2004, memoir)

Compilations in English

- The Wedding of Zein and Other Stories (1968). Trans. Denys Johnson-Davies. Includes: The Doum Tree of Wad Hamid, A Handful of Dates and The Wedding of Zein.
- Season of Migration to the North / The Wedding of Zein (1980). Trans. Denys Johnson-Davies
- Bandarshah (1996). Trans. Denys Johnson-Davies

Themes of some of his magazine articles, published in Arabic:

- The shining stars are like the stars of the Arab and Frankish flags, 2005
- For cities, uniqueness and modernity - East - 2005
- Cities have uniqueness and modernity - the West - 2005
- In the company of Al-Mutanabi and his companions, 2005
- In Janadriyah and Assilah, 2005
- My homeland, Sudan, 2005
- Memories of the seasons 2005
- Thoughts of travel 2005
- Introductions 2009

== Death ==
Salih died on 18 February 2009 in London. His body was buried on 20 February in Sudan, where the funeral ceremony was attended by a large number of prominent personalities and Arab writers, as well as the then Sudanese President Omar Al-Bashir, writer and former Prime Minister Sadiq Al Mahdi, and Muhammad Othman Al-Mirghani.

== Tribute ==
On 12 July 2017 Google Doodle commemorated Tayeb Salih's 88th birthday.

== See also ==
- Sudanese literature
- List of Sudanese writers
- Modern Arabic literature
