= List of Sudanese people =

This is a list of notable Sudanese people.

== Academics and science ==
- Muddathir Abdel-Rahim (born 1932), political scientist
- Ali M. El-Agraa (born 1941), economist
- Mohamed Osman Baloola (born 1981), biomedical engineer who works on diabetes monitoring
- Mamoun Beheiry (1925–2002), economist, president of the African Development Bank and twice finance minister
- Nashwa Eassa (born 1980), nano-particle physicist
- Ismail El Gizouli, acting president of the IPCC
- Iman Abuzeid, physician and entrepreneur
- Mohamed Hag Ali Hassan (born 1947), mathematician and physicist
- Abdulaziz Abdul Ghani Ibrahim (1939–2022), researcher and historian
- Abir Ibrahim, author, development economist, public historian, member of the World Economic Forum
- Daoud Mustafa Khalid, neurologist
- Awn Alsharif Qasim, (1933–2006), writer, educator, encyclopedist
- Khalida Zahir (1927–2015), physician

== Businesspeople ==
- Mo Ibrahim, businessman
- Osama Daoud Abdellatif, businessman

== Entertainment ==
- Alsarah, singer
- Mohammed al Amin, musician
- Bangs, South Sudanese hip hop artist
- Bas, Sudanese-American rapper
- Ramey Dawoud, Sudanese-American Hip hop artist and actor
- Ajak Deng, model
- Ataui Deng, model
- Emmanuel Jal, South Sudanese musician
- Abdel Karim al Kabli, singer
- Hajooj Kuka, filmmaker
- Abdel Aziz El Mubarak, singer
- Oddisee, rapper
- Natasja Saad, rapper
- Abdel Gadir Salim, singer
- Alexander Siddig, actor
- Mohammed Wardi, singer
- Alek Wek, model and designer

== Historical figures ==
- Al Khalifa Abdullah, leader during Mahdist era
- Muhammad Ahmad, religious leader during Mahdist era

== Literature ==
- Muddathir Abdel-Rahim, political scientist and scholar of Islam
- Abdullah El Tayib, scholar of the Arabic language, wrote a detailed primer on approaching ancient and medieval Arabic poetry.
- Tayeb Salih, novelist and prolific writer (The Wedding of Zein, Season of Migration to the North)
- Ibrahim 'Ali Salman, famous poet from Dar al-Manasir

== Media ==
- Zeinab Badawi, Sudanese-British television and radio reporter and news presenter at BBC News
- Nima Elbagir, award-winning senior international correspondent for CNN based in London
- Yousra Elbagir, Sudanese-British journalist, Africa correspondent for Sky News
- Nesrine Malik, opinion columnist at The Guardian
- Alfred Taban, journalist, founder of Khartoum Monitor newspaper

== Politics and government ==
- Muddathir Abdel-Rahim, former ambassador to Sweden, Norway, Denmark, and Finland. Delegate to the UN General Assembly.
- Lam Akol, foreign affairs minister and former lecturer at University of Khartoum
- Abdallah Muhammed at-Tom, elected to Sudan’s first House of Representatives
- Ismail al-Azhari, former Prime Minister and first Head of State of Sudan, oversaw the independence of Sudan in 1956
- Abdallah Bakr Mustafa, nazir of Gedaref and member of the Legislative Assembly between 1948 and 1953
- Rashid Bakr, former Prime Minister
- Omar al-Bashir, former President of Sudan
- Mandour El Mahdi, former Principal of the Institute of Education in Sudan
- Osman Eltayeb, Honorary Consul of Sudan in Nigeria and CPA participant
- John Garang, former Vice President and Sudan peace signer
- Abdul Kamara, United Nations Joint Special Representative
- Sayed Ahmad Keir, second Foreign Minister of Sudan, 1958–1964
- Yousif Kuwa (1945–2001) revolutionary, rebel commander and politician
- Mariam al-Mahdi, Foreign Minister of Sudan
- Sadiq al-Mahdi (1935–2020) former Prime Minister of Sudan
- Ammar Mohammed Mahmoud, diplomat
- Salva Kiir, Vice President of Sudan
- Minni Minnawi, leader of largest faction of Sudan Liberation Army
- Ahmed al-Mirghani, former Head of State of Sudan
- Abd ul-Hamid Musa Madibbo, representative from Nyala Baggara East
- Abdul-Haleem Ismail Al-Mutaafi, Minister of Agriculture and Irrigation
- Gaafar Nimeiry, fourth President of Sudan
- Hassan al-Turabi, scholar and thinker who helped initiate and establish the Islamic movement in the Sudan.
- Abdalla Hamdok, former prime minister of Sudan.
- Shartai Jaafar Abdel Hakam, former governor of West Darfur

== Humanitarians ==
- Emtithal Mahmoud, poet, activist
- Hajja Kashif Badri, women's right activist
- Nisreen Elsaim, youth climate activist
- Dalia Haj-Omar, human rights activist
- Hadeel Ibrahim, philanthropist
- Fatima Talib Ismaeil, women's right activist
- Nahid Toubia, physician and activist for gender equality

== Religious figures ==
- Muhammad Ahmad, religious leader

== Sports ==
- Nagmeldin Ali Abubakr, athlete
- Yamilé Aldama, triple jumper
- Manute Bol, former NBA basketball player and activist
- Luol Deng, NBA basketball player
- Deng Gai, former NBA player
- Ismail Ahmed Ismail, athlete
- Hassan El Kashief, retired athlete
- Omer Khalifa, retired athlete who set a national record over 1500 metres in Grosseto in 1986
- John Mirona, Olympic boxer
- Todd Matthews-Jouda, athlete
- Haitham Mustafa, footballer
- Marco Arop, middle distance runner

== See also ==
- Demographics of Sudan
- List of African writers by country
- List of Sudanese actors
- List of Sudanese artists
- List of Sudanese singers
- List of Sudanese writers
