= List of African educators, scientists and scholars =

This is a list of African scholars who were born or active on the African continent.

== North Africa ==
=== Egypt ===
- Imhotep fl. (2667–2611 BC), Egyptian polymath
- Muhammad Abduh (1849–1905), Egyptian jurist, religious scholar and liberal reformer, regarded as the founder of Islamic Modernism.
- Hassan al-Jabarti (d. 1774) – mathematician, theologian, astronomer and philosopher, considered one of the great scholars of the 18th century
- Abū Kāmil Shujā ibn Aslam (c. 850 – c. 930)
- Sameera Moussa (1917–1952), Egyptian nuclear scientist.
- Arius (c. 250/256–336), Christian priest from Alexandria, Egypt.
- Al-Suyuti (c. 1445–1505), Egyptian writer, religious scholar, juristic expert and teacher.
- Ahmed Zewail (1946–2016), Egyptian-American scientist, awarded the 1999 Nobel Prize in Chemistry for laser studies in femtochemistry.
- Mahmud Ahmad Hamdi al-Falaki (1815–1885), Egyptian cartographer, teacher, Minister of Public Instruction.
- Ismail Mustafa al-Falaki (1825–1901), Egyptian astronomer and mathematician.

=== Carthage ===
- Saint Cyprian (c. 210 – September 14, 258), bishop of Carthage and early Christian writer.

=== Tunisia ===
- Aziza Baccouche (1976–2021), American physicist and filmmaker born and raised in Tunisia
- Hayet Omri (1981–), Tunisian politician and inventor

=== Other ===
- Abbas Ibn Firnas (809–887)
- Nur ad-Din al-Betrugi (died c. 1204)
- Tertullian (c. 160 – c. 220), Christian Berber author and writer of Christian Latin literature.
- Augustine of Hippo (354–430), Bishop of Hippo Regius and Romanized Berber philosopher and theologian.

=== Algeria ===
- Muhammad al-Maghili (died c. 1505), Islamic scholar from Tlemcen in modern-day Algeria
- Fatsah Ouguergouz (1958-), international law scholar and judge of the African Court on Human and Peoples' Rights

=== Morocco ===
- Rachid Yazami (1953–), French Moroccan scientist best known for his research on lithium-ion batteries.

=== Sudanese ===
- Mo Ibrahim, (1946–), Sudanese-born British mobile communications entrepreneur and engineer
- Ali M. El-Agraa (1941–), economist
- Mohamed Osman Baloola (1981–), biomedical engineer who works on diabetes monitoring
- Mamoun Beheiry (1925–2002), economist, president of the African Development Bank and twice finance minister
- Nashwa Eassa (19??–), nano-particle physicist
- Ismail El Gizouli, acting president of the IPCC
- Mohamed H.A. Hassan (1947–), mathematician and physicist

== East Africa ==
=== Ethiopian ===
- Rediet Abebe (1991–), Ethiopian computer scientist and was appointed at the Harvard Society of Fellows as the first female computer scientist.
- Berhane Asfaw (1954–), Ethiopian paleontologist.
- Giday WoldeGabriel (1955–), Ethiopian geologist.
- Gebisa Ejeta (1950–), Ethiopian plant breeder and geneticist who won the 2009 World Food Prize.
- Sossina M. Haile (1966–), Inventor of Solid acid fuel cells, professor of Materials Science and Chemical Engineering at the California Institute of Technology.
- Mulugeta Bekele (1947–), Professor of Physics at Addis Ababa University.
- Aklilu Lemma (1934–1997), Ethiopian physician and was co-awarded the 1989 Right Livelihood Award.
- Dessalegn Rahmato (1940–), Ethiopia sociologist and was awarded the 1998 Prince Claus Award.
- Legesse Wolde-Yohannes, Ethiopian horticultural scientist and was co-awarded the 1989 Right Livelihood Award.
- Melaku Worede (1936–), Ethiopian horticultural scientist and was co-awarded the 1989 Right Livelihood Award.
- Tewolde Berhan Gebre Egziabher (1940–2023), Ethiopian environmental scientist and the General Manager of the Environmental Protection Authority of Ethiopia. He was awarded the 2000 Right Livelihood Award and 2006 Champions of the Earth.

=== Somali ===
- Abdusalam Abubakar (1989/90–) – one of the youngest winners of the BT Young Scientist of the Year Award; later went on to win the European Union Contest for Young Scientists for his project, An Extension of Wiener's Attack on RSA
- Ali Said Faqi – scientist and the leading researcher on the design and interpretation of toxicology studies at the MPI research center in Mattawan, Michigan
- Jama Musse Jama (1967–) – ethnomathematician and author; known for his research on traditional Somali board games such as Shax and the history of mathematics in the Horn of Africa and the founder of Hargeysa Cultural Centre
- Ahmed Mumin Warfa – scientist, specialized in botany and jointly discovered the Cyclamen somalense, the first genus from tropical Africa with his colleague Mats Thulin; the "world's pre-eminent authority on frankincense"; professor at Salt Lake Community College
- Shaykh Sufi – popularly known as Sheikh Sufi, was a 19th-century Somali scholar, poet, reformist and astrologist
- Ahmed Ismail Samatar – prominent Somali writer, professor and former dean of the Institute for Global Citizenship at Macalester College. He is the editor of Bildhaan: An International Journal of Somali Studies, and brother of Abdi Ismail Samatar, chair of the geography department at the University of Minnesota.
- Abdigani Diriye - (born 1986) is a Somali computer scientist and research scientist at IBM Research – Africa, working in the fields of human-computer interaction (HCI), data mining and financial technology (FinTech). Diriye was named a TEDGlobal 2017 fellow, an MIT Technology Review 'Innovator Under 35', and a 'Next Einstein Forum' fellow.
- Shaykh Sufi - (b. 1829 – 1904), popularly known as Sheikh Sufi, was a 19th-century Somali scholar, poet, reformist and astrologist.
- Abdi Ismail Samatar - (born 1950) is a Somali scholar, writer and professor of geography.

=== Eritrean ===
- Haile Debas (1937–), Eritrean who achieved national recognition as a gastrointestinal investigator and made original contributions to the physiology, biochemistry, and pathophysiology of gastrointestinal peptide hormones.

=== Kenyan ===
- B.A. Ogot (1929-2024)-a renowned african historian and the first Kenyan PhD hoder in humanities and application of oral history

Wangari Maathai (1940–2010), Kenyan environmental and political activist who won the 2004 Nobel Peace Prize.

- Thomas R. Odhiambo (1931–2003), Kenyan entomologist and environmental activist.
- Phoebe Okowa (1965–), Kenyan international law scholar and Member of the UN International Law Commission
- Henry Odera Oruka (1944–1995), Kenyan philosopher known for Sage philosophy project started in the 1970s.
- Calestous Juma (1953–2017), Kenyan internationally recognised authority in the application of science and technology to sustainable development worldwide.
- Paula Kahumbu (1966–), Kenyan wildlife conservationist and Chief Executive Officer of WildlifeDirect.
- Marjorie Oludhe Macgoye (1928–2015), Kenyan poet, novelist and missionary bookseller also known as the "Mother of Kenyan literature".
- Ngugi wa thion'go (1938–2025), Kenyan writer and literature academic.
- Richard Leakey (1944–2022), Kenyan paleoanthropologist and wildlife conservationist.
- Meja Mwangi (1948–2025), Award winning Kenyan novelist and writer of plays and children's books.
- Grace Ogot (1930–2015), Kenyan author and first anglophone Kenyan female writer to be published, together with Charity Waciuma.
- Ken Walibora (1964-2020), Kenyan Ph.D holder in Comparative Cultural Studies from Ohio State University, USA. He promoted Swahili Language and Literature, and was a writer of Swahili fiction and poems.
- John Mbiti (1931-2019), Kenyan Ph.D holder in Theology from the University of Cambridge. His main line of interest and research was Christian Theology in African Traditional Religion. In addition, he was a philosopher, writer and ordained priest of the Anglican Church.

=== Ugandan ===
- Joshua Sikhu Okonya, Ugandan entomologist and climate change scientist.
- Venansius Baryamureeba, Ugandan professor of computer science and educationist.
- Kwatsi Alibaruho, Ugandan American flight director at NASA.
- Ivan Edwards (physician), Ugandan American physician and Flight surgeon in the US Air Force Reserve. He started a Child Sponsorship Program for displaced orphans in Uganda.
- Dr. Catherine Nakalembe, Ugandan team leader for the NASA Harvest Consortium, Assistant Professor at the University of Maryland, and SERVIR Applied Sciences team member.
- Prof. Harriet Mayanja-Kizza, Ugandan physician and researcher at Makerere University College of Health Sciences in Kampala, Uganda.
- Prof. Sandy Stevens Tickodri-Togboa, Ugandan engineer and the driving force behind Kiira Motors, a pioneering electric mobility venture.
- Brian Mushana Kwesiga, entrepreneur, engineer, and former president and CEO, Ugandan North American Association (UNAA)
- Prof. Florence Muranga, Ugandan biochemist, food scientist, academic and corporate executive, she heads the "Banana Industrial |Research Development Centre (BIRDC)".
- Mahmood Mamdani, Indian-born Ugandan academic, author and Herbert Lehman Professor of Government.

=== Tanzanian ===
- Hulda Swai, researcher and professor in life sciences and bioengineering

== West Africa ==
=== Cameroonian ===
- Ibrahim Njoya (c. 1860 – c. 1933), ruler of the Bamum people, in what is now western Cameroon credited with developing a semi-syllabic Bamum script which evolved from the rudimentary pictographic script to a more advanced logo graphic script, which he later refined to the semi-syllabic script known to the world today.
- Pelkins Ajanoh, Cameroonian graduate of Massachusetts Institute of Technology, invented a novel technology for calibrating radars for self-driving cars while pursuing an internship at General Motors.

=== Congo ===
- Jean-Jacques Muyembe-Tamfum, Congolese microbiologist, investigated the first Ebola outbreak, and was part of the effort that discovered Ebola as a new disease. In August 2019, he led the research that discovered the most effective treatment for Ebola, mAb114, working with other researchers at the INRB and the National Institute of Health Vaccine Research Center in the US.

=== Gambian ===
- Tumani Corrah is a Gambian clinician whose fields of research include tuberculosis, HIV and malaria.

=== Ghanaian ===
- Alexander Anim-Mensah, Ghanaian-American chemical engineer, inventor, and author. He is known for the contributions towards the field of membrane science and technology.

=== Malian ===
- Mohammed Bagayogo (1523–1593), eminent scholar from Timbuktu, Mali.
- Cheick Modibo Diarra (1952–), Malian-born aerospace engineer who contributed to several NASA missions such as Mars Path Finder, the Galileo spacecraft, and the Mars Observer.
- Ahmad Baba (1556–1627), medieval West African writer, scholar, and political provocateur.

=== Sierra Leonean ===
- Abioseh Davidson Nicol, biomedical scientist and physician who discovered the breakdown of insulin in the human body, a breakthrough for the treatment of diabetes.
- John Farrell Easmon, physician who coined the term "Blackwater Fever" and was the first to link the disease directly to malaria.
- Edward Wilmot Blyden III, diplomat, political scientist and educator.
- Abu Bakarr Kanu, academic and chemist.
- Ogunlade Davidson, academic and engineer.
- Noah Arthur Cox-George, academic and economist.
- Akintola Josephus Wyse, academic, author and historian.
- Aisha Fofana Ibrahim, academic and activist.
- Cyril Foray, academic, author and historian.
- Arthur Daniel Porter III, academic, author and historian.
- Olumbe Bassir, academic, biochemist and activist.
- Violet Showers Johnson, academic, author and historian.
- Mohamed Juldeh Jalloh, political scientist and politician.
- Kandeh Baba Conteh, political scientist and politician.
- Kadi Sesay, feminist, politician and linguist.
- Eustace Palmer, academic, literary critic and author.
- Omotunde E.G. Johnson, economist and researcher.

=== Nigerian ===
- Osuolale Abdramon Tiamiyu

Nigerian Computer Networks and Telecommunications specialist,

- Chris Abani (born 27 December 1966), Nigerian and American author
- Catherine Obianuju Acholonu (26 October 1951 – 18 March 2014), Nigerian writer, researcher and former lecturer on African Cultural and Gender Studies.
- Akin Adesokan, Nigerian writer, scholar and novelist
- Chimamanda Ngozi Adichie (born 15 September 1977), Nigerian writer whose works range from novels to short stories to nonfiction
- Toyin Adewale-Gabriel (born 1969), Nigerian writer
- Ifi Amadiume (born 23 April 1947), Nigerian poet, anthropologist and essayist
- Yemisi Aribisala (born 27 April 1973), Nigerian essayist, writer, painter, and food memoirist
- Nnorom Azuonye (1967–2024), publisher, theater director, playwright, poet and advertising professional
- Chinwe Nwogo Ezeani, Nigerian Chartered Librarian and the former University Librarian of Nnamdi Azkiwe Library University of Nigeria Nsukka.
- Philip Emeagwali, computer scientist mathematician and engineer
- Odafe Atogun, Nigerian writer
- John Ogbu (1939–2003), Nigerian-American anthropologist and university professor
- Chika Okeke-Agulu (born, September 18, 1966), art historian, professor and director of African Studies, Princeton University
- Seyi Oyesola, Nigerian doctor, who co-invented hospital in a box
- Bisi Ezerioha (born 1972), Nigerian engineer, racer and former pharmaceutical executive who has built some of the world's most powerful Honda and Porsche engines.
- Bennet Omalu (born 1968), Nigerian forensic pathologist, who discovered a neurological deterioration that is similar to Alzheimer's disease while conducting an autopsy on former NFL football player Mike Webster.
- Suleiman Elias Bogoro is professor of Animal Science, specializing in Biochemistry and Ruminant Nutrition.

=== Senegalese ===
- Cheikh Anta Diop (1923–1986), Senegalese historian, anthropologist, physicist and politician.

== Southern Africa ==
=== South African ===
- Christiaan Barnard (1922–2001), South African cardiac surgeon, who performed the world's first successful human-to-human heart transplant.
- Sydney Brenner (1927–2019), South African biologist, who won the 2002 Nobel prize in Physiology or Medicine.
- Allan McLeod Cormack (1924–1998), South African-born American physicist, who won the 1979 Nobel Prize in Physiology or Medicine.
- Mulalo Doyoyo (born 1970), South African professor, engineer and inventor.
- Trefor Jenkins (born 1932), human geneticist from South Africa, noted for his work on DNA.
- Aaron Klug (1926–2018), Lithuanian-born British chemist and biophysicist, who won the 1982 Nobel Prize in Chemistry. He moved to South Africa at the age of two and studied at the University of Witwatersrand and the University of Cape Town.
- Tshilidzi Marwala (born 1971), South African scientist and inventor.
- Thebe Medupe (born 1973), South African astrophysicist and founding director of Astronomy Africa.
- Azwinndini Muronga, professor of physics and dean of science.
- Philiswa Nomngongo, professor of Analytical Chemistry and the South African Research Chair (SARChI) in nanotechnology for water.
- Himla Soodyall (born 1963), South African human geneticist, known for genetic research into the peoples of sub-Saharan Africa.
- Andries Van Aarde (born 1951), professor of theology at University of Pretoria.
- Quarraisha Abdool Karim, South African HIV researcher.

=== Tanzanian ===
- Felix A. Chami, archaeologist and university professor from Tanzania.
- Erasto B. Mpemba (born 1950), Tanzanian scientist and physicist who discovered the eponymous Mpemba effect, a paradoxical phenomenon in which hot water freezes faster than cold water under certain conditions.

=== Zambian ===
- Chaloka Beyani (born 1959), professor of international law at the London School of Economics.

== African diaspora ==
- List of African-American inventors and scientists
- Al-Jahiz (781–868/869), Afro-Arab scholar of East African descent.
