= List of Ethiopian scientists =

The following individuals are notable scientists and engineers from Ethiopia or of Ethiopian descent:

- Rediet Abebe (born 1991), Ethiopian-American computer scientist, mathematician and Junior Fellow at the Harvard Society of Fellows.
- Zeresenay Alemseged (born 1969), Ethiopian-American paleoanthropologist; discovered Selam, a fossil child of the species Australopithecus afarensis.
- Berhane Asfaw (born 1954), archeologist and paleontologist; co-discovered skeletal remains at Herto Bouri now classified as Homo sapiens idaltu.
- Mulugeta Bekele (born 1947), professor of physics at Addis Ababa University.
- Yonas Beyene (born 1966), archaeologist with focus on the palaeoarchaeology of the Middle Awash.
- Sebsebe Demissew (born 1991), professor of plant systematics and biodiversity at Addis Ababa University and executive director of the Gullele Botanic Garden in Addis Ababa.
- Gebisa Ejeta (born 1950), plant breeder and geneticist; won the 2009 World Food Prize.
- Senait Fisseha (born 1971), endocrinologist at University of Michigan working with reproductive endocrinology and infertility.
- Tewolde Berhan Gebre Egziabher (born 1940), environmental scientist and the general manager of the Environmental Protection Authority of Ethiopia.
- Timnit Gebru (born 1983), Ethiopian-American computer scientist and former co-lead of the Google Ethical Artificial Intelligence Team.
- Mitiku Haile (born 1951), professor of soil science and founding president at Mekelle University.
- Sossina M. Haile (born 1966), professor of materials science and chemical engineering at the California Institute of Technology.
- Segenet Kelemu (born 1957), molecular plant pathologist; Director General of the International Centre of Insect Physiology and Ecology.
- Aklilu Lemma (1934–1997), physician; co-awarded the 1989 Right Livelihood Award.
- Jelani Nelson (born 1984), Ethiopian-American professor of Electrical Engineering and Computer Science at the University of California.
- Dessalegn Rahmato (born 1940), sociologist; awarded the 1998 Prince Claus Award.
- Legesse Wolde-Yohannes (born 1936), horticultural scientist; co-awarded the 1989 Right Livelihood Award.
- Giday WoldeGabriel (born 1955), geologist and archeologist; co-discovered skeletal remains at Herto Bouri now classified as Homo sapiens idaltu.
- Melaku Worede (born 1936), geneticist and agronomist; renowned for building one of the finest seed conservation centers in the world.
- Yohannes Haile-Selassie (born 1961), paleoanthropologist; curator of physical anthropology at the Cleveland Museum of Natural History; director of the Arizona State University Institute of Human Origins.
- Dr. Semunegus Hailemariam (1936 - 2018) was a renowned scientist with over 40 years of experience in horticultural research, production, processing, and marketing of fruits and vegetables in Bangladesh and Vietnam as well as Ethiopia where he directed the Ethiopian Institute of Agricultural Research for eleven years. He also founded and directed the Horticulture Development Corporation (HDC) for the Ethiopian Government for 10 years. One of the most important activities of HDC was to establish the Ethiopian Fruit & Vegetable Marketing, also known as “ET Fruit.” Dr. Hailemariam additionally led the Jimma Agricultural Research Center (JARC), a prominent institution in Ethiopia established in 1967 to coordinate and generate coffee research, releasing over 40 coffee varieties to improve quality and disease resistance. The National Coffee Board of Ethiopia identifies Dr. Hailemariam as a critical scientist (Officer-in-Charge/Agronomist) during the initial years of the station's operations. JARC is renowned for developing coffee varieties resistant to coffee berry disease (CBD) and enhancing the livelihood of smallholder farmers. It continues to play a vital role in Ethiopian agriculture, collaborating with organizations like World Coffee Research to boost coffee production and sustainability. In December 1965, Dr. Hailemariam obtained a Ph.D. degree in Horticulture, from Michigan State University, in East Lansing, Michigan. In July 1960, he obtained a M.S. in Citriculture from the University of California, Los Angeles and in June 1958 he also obtained a B.Sc. degree from the College of Agriculture, Ethiopia. Dr. Hailemariam has written numerous scientific publications and lectured at universities in Ethiopia and the United States.

== See also ==
- List of African educators, scientists and scholars
