= List of Sudanese actors =

This is a list of notable actors and actresses from Sudan. This list includes members of the Sudanese diaspora.

== A ==
- Asia Abdelmajid
- Hrant Alianak

== B ==
- Zeinab Badawi
- Salah ibn Al Badiya
- Panther Bior

== D ==
- Anusha Dandekar
- Ramey Dawoud

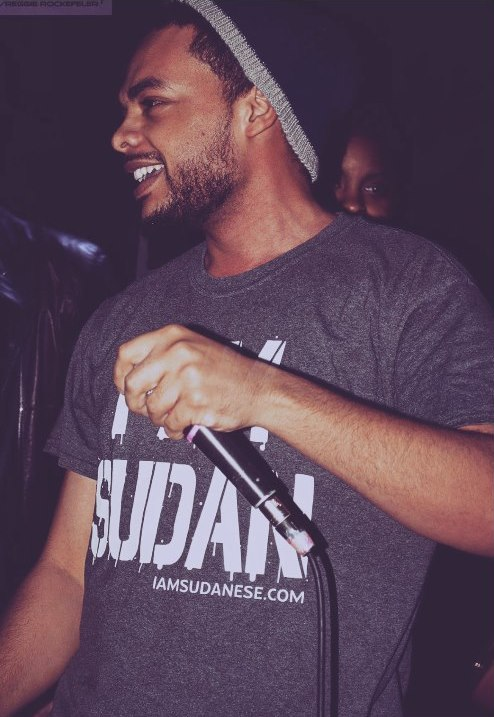
Ramey Dawoud, 2015

== K ==
- Hajooj Kuka

== M ==
- Ibrahim Mursal

== O ==
- Owiso Odera

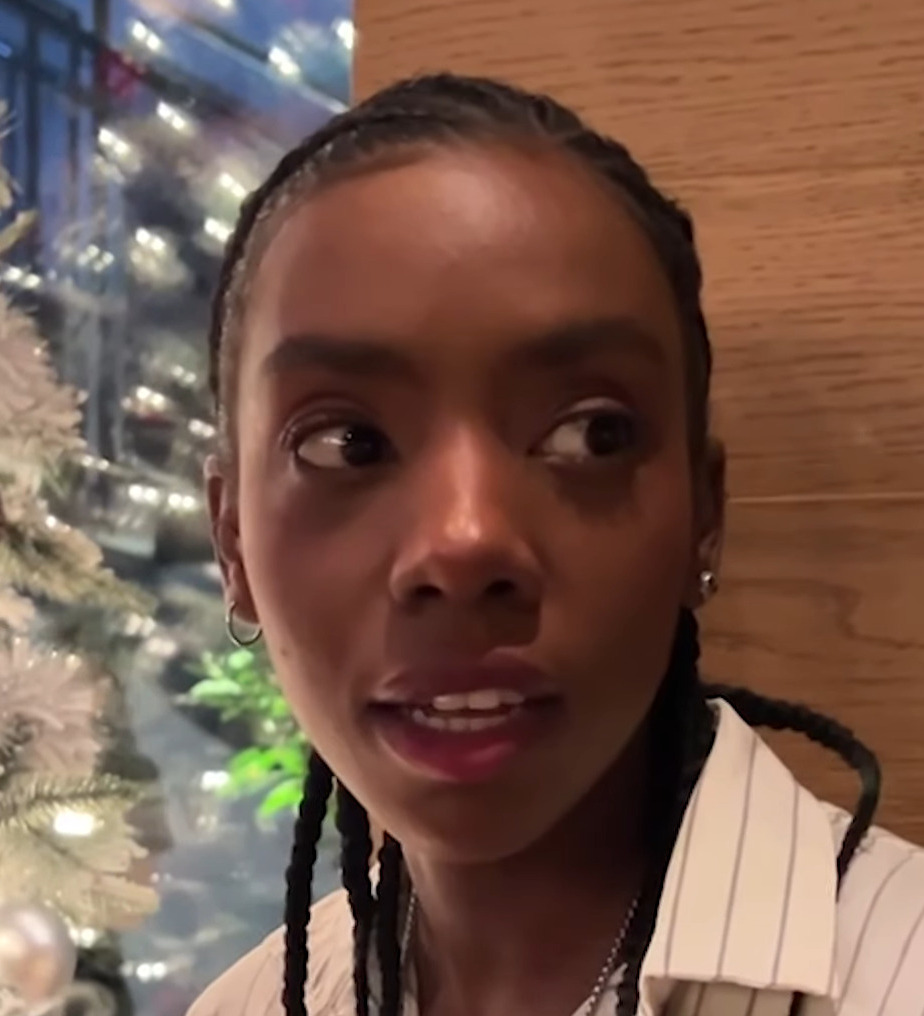
Dua Saleh, 2023

== S ==
- Fadel Saeed
- Dua Saleh
- Alexander Siddig

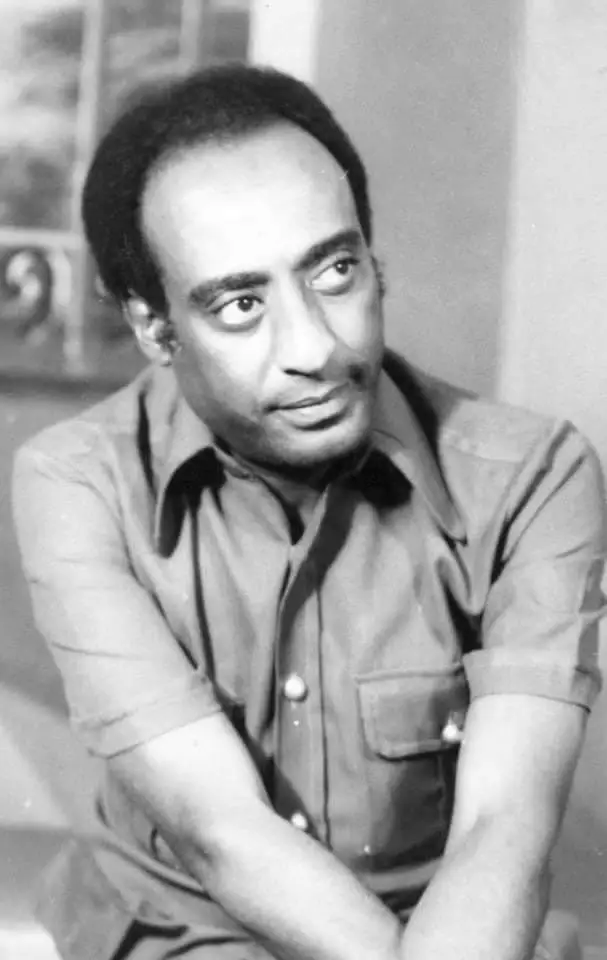
Fadel Saeed, 1966

== T ==
- Abdul Hakim Al-Taher

== U ==
- Ahmed Umar

== Y ==
- Hamza Yassin
- Eiman Yousif

== Z ==
- Andreas Voutsinas

== See also ==
- Cinema of Sudan
- Visual arts of Sudan
- List of Sudanese people
- List of Sudanese artists
