= PGRC =

PGRC can refer to:

- Phased Geological Repository Concept developed by NIREX (now Nuclear Decommissioning Authority, NDA, Radioactive Waste Management, RMW) for the deep geological repository program in the United Kingdom
- Philadelphia Girls' Rowing Club
- A seedbank, including:
  - Plant Genetic Resources Canada, part of Agriculture and Agri-Food Canada
  - Plant Genetic Resources Centre:
    - in Ethiopia, founded by Melaku Worede
    - operated by the Southern African Development Community
    - in Sri Lanka
    - in Uganda
