= Suad Ibrahim Ahmed =

Sudanese politician and women's rights activist (1935–2013)

- Born: May 30, 1935; Omdurman, Sudan
- Died: December 29, 2013 (aged 78); Khartoum, Sudan
- Education: University of Khartoum
- Occupations: Activist; writer
- Political party: Sudanese Communist Party

Suad Ibrahim Ahmed (May 30, 1935 – December 29, 2013) was a leader and central committee member of the Sudanese Communist Party. She was an activist for women's issues. She was a leader in the struggle against displacement of Nubian people of the Wadi Halfa region caused by erection of the Aswan Dam.

== Early life and education ==
Ahmed was born on May 30, 1935, in Omdurman to Ibrahim Ahmed, an educationist and liberal politician who served as Sudan's Finance Minister in the government led by Abdallah Khalil. Her schooling was done in Catholic as well as public schools. She joined the University of Khartoum in 1955 as an undergraduate and graduated in 1960. During this time, she was involved in the theatre scene, founding the Society of Music and Drama as well as performing in a number of plays. She also became active in politics and joined the Communist-led Democratic Front. She became the first woman to hold an executive position at the University's Students Union in 1957. She served as the Union deputy chair and was responsible for redrafting the Union's constitution.

== Political activism ==
After graduation, Ahmed moved to Wadi Halfa, working in the government's Statistics department. During this time period, construction work was starting on the Aswan Dam on River Nile, which would submerge Wadi Halfa, forcing the local Nubian population to relocate. This caused unrest in the area, which Ahmed joined. She was fired from her government job as a result. Her lifelong advocacy for the rights of Nubian people in face of displacement due to construction of dams led to her being referred to as 'Mother of the Nubians'

Ahmed joined the staff of Sawt el-Mara (The Women's Voice), a journal published by the Sudan Women's Union (SWU). The journal was edited by fellow Communist activist Fatima Ahmed Ibrahim. While respectful towards the older and more socially conservative Ibrahim, Ahmed disagreed sharply about the role of women, religion and morality and party strategies. While Ibrahim believed that Islam could be used as a progressive force against religious conservatives, Ahmed wanted to ground women's struggle in secular ideas. Ahmed felt staying within the Islamic framework would force progressives to fight on their opponents' terrain.

In 1967, Ahmed was one of four women to be elected to the 33 member Central Committee of the Sudanese Communist Party, along with Mahasin Abd al-Aal, Naima Babiker al-Rayah and Fatima Ahmed Ibrahim.
