= Zarouhi Sarkissian =

One of the first two women physicians in Sudan

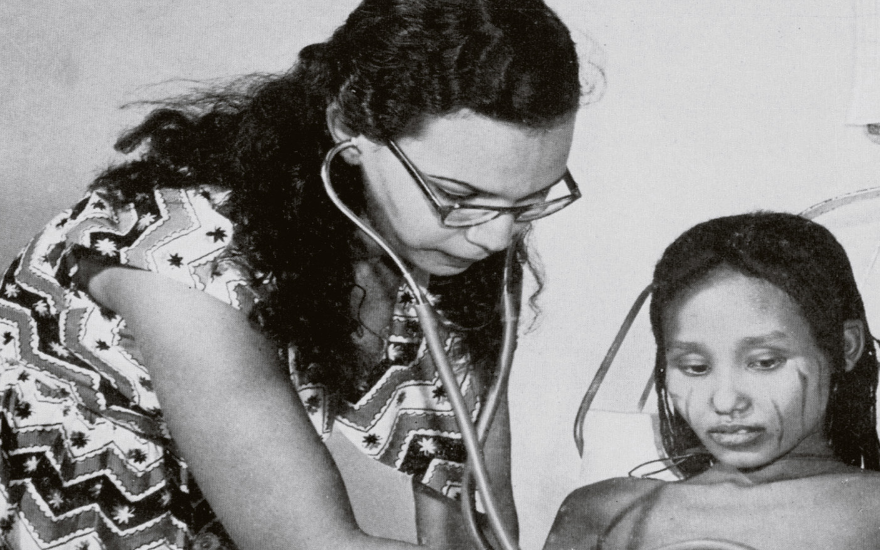
- Born: September 9, 1929; Khartoum North
- Died: December 1, 1986 (aged 57); London
- Education: Faculty of Medicine, University of Khartoum (MD)
- Occupation: Physician
- Years active: 1952–1956
- Known for: Being one of the first two women to practise medicine in Sudan
- Spouse: Saad Aboulela (married 1955)
- Parents: Attiat Mohamed Najm; Vahan Sarkissian

Zarouhi Sarkissian (9 September, 1929 – 1 December, 1986) was a Sudanese physician. She and Khalida Zahir were the first women to practise medicine in Sudan.

== Early life ==
Sarkissian was born in Bahri, Sudan to Attiat Mohamed Najm, a Sudanese woman of Coptic Egyptian descent. Her father, Vahan Sarkissian, died before her birth; he was an Armenian national employed by Sudan's Mechanical Transport Department. (Their family name is sometimes recorded as Serkisiani.)

Sarkissian had an older full sister, Taqwi (also recorded as Takwa) and half-sister, Zainub "Rifqa" Mustafa Bayoumi. She received her secondary education from Unity High School.

== Medical career ==
=== Education ===
In 1946, Sarkissian enrolled at the Kitchener School of Medicine (later the Faculty of Medicine of the University of Khartoum), aged 17. It was unusual for women to be admitted at this time, but she was recognised as academically gifted alongside her classmate, Khalida Zahir.

Also in 1946, Sarkissian and her older sister Taqwi founded Bint al-wadi ("Daughter of the Valley"), the first women's magazine to operate in Sudan. Released once a month, the magazine contained articles on social and literary topics. Most contributors were men, though some women wrote articles; issues were primarily distributed in schools. The magazine ceased publishing in 1948.

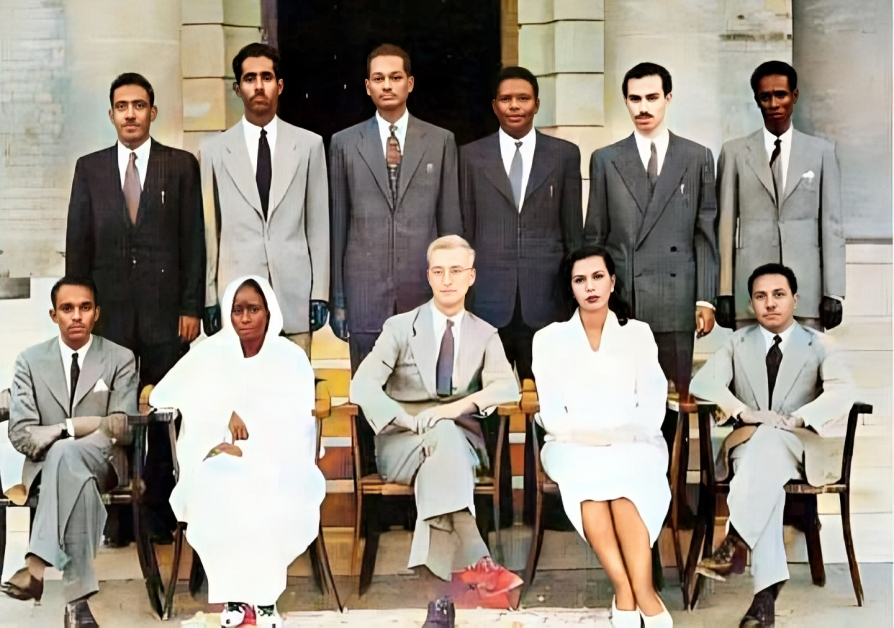
Kitchener School of Medicine graduates, 1952. Seated: Khalida Zahir (second from left) and Zarouhi Sarkissian (second from right).

During their time at university, Sarkissian and Zahir studied together and became active in student politics. They participated in the university's first protest against foreign rule, advocating for Sudanese independence, and shared an interest in women's liberation.

They graduated together in 1952, sharing the distinction of being Sudan's first woman physicians.

=== Career ===
At the time of Sarkissian's graduation, the Sudanese public opposed the idea of women in the workplace on social and religious grounds. They were not typically offered permanent employment or pensions, and sometimes faced physical abuse while travelling to and from work.

Of the two women to graduate as Sudan's first female physicians, Zahir rejected the poor treatment she and other women received by entering Sudan's early women's liberation movement alongside her work as a doctor. Sarkissian, too, began practising medicine: she worked at a hospital in Wad Madani, and also established a private clinic. Nevertheless, she did not work as a physician for long. She married in 1955, and closed her practice shortly afterwards to become a housewife.

== Personal life and death ==
With her husband Saad Aboulela, Sarkissian had three children: Leila, Nader, and Nada. After converting to Islam in 1960, she also went by the name Thuraya Mohamed Saad.

Sarkissian died on 1 December, 1986 at St Mary’s Hospital in London. She is buried at Brookwood Cemetery.
