= Seeds of Freedom =

Seeds of Freedom may refer to:

- "Seed of Freedom", a song by Young Jessie
- Seeds of Freedom, a 1929 film by Leonid Leonidov
- Seeds of Freedom, a 1943 film starring Aline MacMahon and Junius Matthews
- Seeds of Freedom, a 2012 documentary featuring Melaku Worede and Percy Schmeiser
