= Fatima Ahmed Ibrahim =

Sudanese writer, women's rights activist and socialist leader

- Born: 1932; Khartoum
- Died: 12 August 2017; London
- Occupations: Human rights defender, politician, women's rights activist, journalist, feminist, author
- Political party: Sudanese Communist Party
- Spouse: El-Shafie Ahmed el-Sheikh
- Awards: Ibn Rushd Prize for Freedom of Thought (2006)

Fatima Ahmed Ibrahim (Arabic: فاطمة احمد ابراهيم; c. 1930 – 12 August 2017), was a Sudanese writer, women's rights activist, advocate and socialist leader.

== Early life ==
Ibrahim was born in Khartoum. Sources give her birth date variously as 20 December 1928, or in 1932 or 1933. She came from an educated family; her grandfather was headmaster at the first Sudanese School for boys as well as Imam at his neighborhood's mosque. Fatima's father graduated from Gordon Memorial College and worked as a teacher. Fatima's mother was amongst the first generation of girls who attended the school. Fatima grew up during the time of colonial Anglo-Egyptian Sudan. Her father was expelled from teaching in a government school when he refused to teach lessons using English. After that her father taught in another school.

== Career ==
After she started at Omdurman Girls' Secondary School, she began to support women's rights. She created a wall newspaper called Elra'edda, or in Arabic الرائدة or in English Pioneer Girls. Her newspaper focused on women's rights and she also wrote in newspapers at that time again under a pen name. Fatima conducted the first women's strike in Sudan because her school administration decided to cancel science lessons and replaced them by 'family science' lessons. The strike was successful. Her activities went beyond school; in 1947 she founded the Intellectual Women's Association, and in 1952 she worked with other women and founded the Sudanese Women's Union (SWU, Arabic: الاتحاد النسائي السوداني, transliteration: Aletahad Elnees'y Alsodanni), where she served on the executive committee with Fatima Talib and Khalida Zahir. The first president of the Union was Fatima Talib Isma'il. The Women's Union opened membership to all women in Sudan and the SWU opened branches in different provinces in Sudan. The agenda of the Women's Union at that time, according to an amendment to its constitution in 1954, focused on the right to vote, women's suffrage, and the right of women to act as representatives in all legislative, political, and administrative corporations. At the SWU she also worked to establish equality with men in wages and technical training, and helped to remove illiteracy among women. Because of the SWU's objectives, there occurred clashes with the political right such as Jabihat El-methaiq elaslami or the Islamic Pledge Front. In 1955 Fatima became a chief editor of Sawat al-Maraa Magazine or Woman's Voice Magazine (published by the Women's Union), and this magazine later played an essential role in the overthrow of the Ibrahim Abboud regime. While at the magazine, Ibrahim clashed with the younger staff writer and fellow Communist Party member, Suad Ibrahim Ahmed. They disagreed sharply about the role of women, religion and morality and party strategies. While Ibrahim believed that Islam could be used as a progressive force against religious conservatives, Ahmed wanted to ground women's struggle in secular ideas. Ahmed felt staying within the Islamic framework would force progressives to fight on their opponents' terrain.

In 1954, Fatima joined the Sudanese Communist Party (SCP), and for a short period Fatima became a member of the Central Committee of the SCP (the SCP was the first Sudanese Party which had an internal women's structure, since 1946). In 1956–57, Fatima became the president of the Women's Union. One of her objectives was for the independence of the union from their affiliation with and domination by the SCP, and she widened the participation of women with difference backgrounds. In 1965 Fatima was elected to parliament, becoming the first Sudanese women deputy. The constitutional crisis caused by the illegal exclusion of the democratically elected SCP members from the Sudanese parliament, which was spearheaded by Sadiq al Mahdi, caused much acrimony between the SCP and the Umma Party. In 1967, Ibrahim was one of four women to be elected to the 33 member Central Committee of the Sudanese Communist Party, along with Mahasin Abd al-Aal, Naima Babiker al-Rayah and Suad Ibrahim Ahmed.

In 1969, when Jaafar Muhammad al-Nemieri took power in a military coup supported by the SCP, the activities of the Women's Union broadened and women gained many rights in different fields. The honeymoon between the Sudanese Communist Party and Jaafar al-Nemieri ended after a huge dispute which led in July 1971 to a military coup supported by SCP led by Hashim Elatta, but the coup failed after a few days and Nimiri returned to power, which led to the execution of the SCP coup leaders, among them Alshafi Ahmed Elshikh a workers union leader and Fatima's husband. After that Fatima was placed under house arrest for several years, and arrested many times during the Nemieri regime.

In 1990, Fatima left Sudan after the Omar Hassan al-Bashir military coup, and joined the opposition in exile as the President of the banned Sudanese Women's Union. In 1991, Fatima was elected President of the Women's International Democratic Federation. She returned to Sudan in 2005 after a reconciliation between the government and opposition, and was appointed as a deputy in the parliament representing the SCP. Her brother is also a writer and involved in politics Salah Ahmed Ibrahim, she has one son from her husband Elshafi, named Ahmed.

She retired from political leadership in 2011. She died in London on 12 August 2017, aged 84, and her funeral was held in Khartoum on 16 August.

== Awards ==
- UN award for Outstanding Achievements in the Field of Human Rights.(1993)
- The Ibn Rushd Prize for Freedom of Thought for the year 2006 in Berlin.

== Works ==
- Hassadanna Khill'al Ashroon A'mm'a, Arabic حصادنا خلال عشرين عاماً, or (Our Harvest During Twenty Years). Khartoum: Sudanese Women's Union Press, n.d.
- Tariqnu ila el-Tuharur (Our Road to Emancipation). (n.d.).
- el-Mara el-Arabiyya wal Taghyir el-Ijtimai, Arabic المرأة العربية والتغيير الاجتماعي or Arab Women and Social Change. 1986
- Holla Gadie'a alahoal al-shekhssia, Arabic حول قضايا الأحوال الشخصية or Personal Status Affairs.
- Gadie'a Alm'ar'a el-A'mela Al-sodania, Arabic قضايا المرأة العاملة السودانية, or The Affairs of Sudanese Workers Women's.
- An'a Awaan Eltageir Lakeen!, Arabic !آن آوان التغيير ولكن or It's Time for Change but!
- Atfallana we'l Re'aia El-sehi'a, Arabic أطفالنا والرعاية الصحية, or Our Children and Health Care.
- "Arrow at Rest". In Women in Exile, ed. Mahnaz Afkhami, 191–208: University Press of Virginia, 1994.
- "Sudan's Attack on Women's Rights Exploits Islam". Africa News 37, no. 5 (1992): 5.
