= Su'ad al-Fatih al-Badawi =

Sudanese academic, politician and journalist (1932–2022)

Su'ad al-Fatih Mohammed al-Badawi
- Born: January 1, 1932; Al-Ubayyid, Kurdufan Province.
- Died: December 23, 2022 (aged 90)
- Education: University of Khartoum 1956
- Occupation: Academician

Su'ad al-Fatih Mohammed al-Badawi (1 January 1932 – 23 December 2022) was a Sudanese academic, politician, and journalist. She was known both for her advocacy of women's rights and for her support of Islamism.

Al-Badawi held degrees from the University of Khartoum and the School of Oriental and African Studies in London, and became a professor of Arabic at Omdurman Islamic University in 1980. Her association with Islamism began in the 1950s, when she was one of the first female members of the Muslim Brotherhood. Al-Badawi later joined the National Islamic Front, and beginning in the 1980s represented the party for several terms in the National Legislature. She also served in the Pan-African Parliament.

== Early life and academic career ==
Al-Badawi was born in Al-Ubayyid, Kurdufan Province. Her paternal grandfather was a prominent Islamic scholar in Omdurman, while her father was a district commissioner, in office during both the Anglo-Egyptian condominium and after independence in 1956. Because of her father's work, al-Badawi lived in a number of different cities as a child, spending periods in Al-Ubayyid, Berber, Atbara, Khartoum, and Omdurman. She completed her secondary education with the support of her father, who had liberal views towards girl's education despite the prevailing societal attitude at the time. Al-Badawi went on to complete a Bachelor of Arts (B.A.) at the University of Khartoum in 1956, as one of the first four women to graduate from the Faculty of Arts. She worked as a high school teacher for a period, and then went to England for further study. In 1961, she graduated from the School of Oriental and African Studies at the University of London with a Master of Arts (M.A.) in Arabic.

After returning from England, al-Badawi was appointed head of the history department at a teacher's college. She later worked in Khartoum as an inspector for the Ministry of Education. In 1969, al-Badawi moved to Saudi Arabia to work as a consultant for UNESCO. She was involved in the establishment of the Girls' College of Education in Riyadh, and served as the college's dean for a period, as well as editing the college magazine. Returning to Sudan, al-Badawi completed a doctorate in Arabic at the University of Khartoum in 1974, and in 1980 was made an associate professor in Arabic at Omdurman Islamic University (OIU). After a brief spell as a deputy vice-chancellor at United Arab Emirates University, she returned to OIU in 1983 to become dean of the women's college, becoming the first woman to hold the position. In the early 1990s, al-Badawi spent a sabbatical as a postdoctoral fellow at the University of Edinburgh, Scotland.

== Politics ==
Al-Badawi's first involvement in politics came as a leader in various women's groups of the 1950s and the 1960s. She represented Sudan at several international gatherings, including the 1952 Arab Women's Conference and the 1957 Soviet Women's Conference. Al-Badawi's initial involvement was with the Sudanese Women's Union, but she and several others left that group due to ideological conflicts. (Note: Sources contradict each other as to when exactly al-Badawi left the Sudanese Women's Union. The Historical Dictionary of the Sudan states she left in 1951, whereas the Dictionary of African Biography says the organisation was only founded in 1952 and that al-Badawi was still a member as late as 1957.) She subsequently helped establish an Islamist women's group, the National Women's Front, having earlier been one of the first female members of the Muslim Brotherhood.

In 1981, al-Badawi became a member of the National People's Council, the legislature of Sudan under President Gaafar Nimeiry. She later served in the National Assembly from 1996 to 2005, and in 2004 was elected to the Pan-African Parliament. For a period in the mid-1980s, al-Badawi was one of only two female legislators in Sudan. She was a member of the National Islamic Front, an Islamist party, and one source has called her "the most visible Islamist woman activist" in Sudan at the time. At an international forum in 1996, al-Badawi spoke of Islam and feminism as mutually exclusive, and rejected the idea of "Islamic feminism" as incompatible with taqwa (piety).

== Journalism ==
In 1956, al-Badawi became the first editor of Al-Manar ("The Beacon"), a weekly magazine published by the women's bureau of the Muslim Brotherhood. The following year, she led a delegation of female Sudanese journalists to France and the United Kingdom. The initial run of Al-Manar lasted less than a year, but the magazine was re-established in 1964 and was said to have had some influence on female voters in the 1965 general election. In later years, al-Badawi produced a weekly television and radio program, and worked as a columnist for various Sudanese newspapers.

== Personal life and death ==
Al-Badawi died on 23 December 2022, at the age of 90.

== See also ==
- Gender inequality in Sudan
