= Abdul Hakim Al-Taher =

Sudanese theater director and actor (1949–2021)

- Born: 1949
- Died: 1 January 2021 (aged 71–72)
- Education: Sudan University of Science and Technology; Cairo University
- Occupations: Actor, director
- Years active: 1967–2021

Abdul Hakim Al-Taher (Arabic: عبد الحكيم الطاهر; 1949 – 1 January 2021) was a Sudanese theater director and actor.

== Biography ==
Al-Taher was born in Affad, Northern State, Anglo-Egyptian Sudan, Egypt. He lost fingers of his left hand while working in a textile factory in 1962. He studied music and theater in the Sudan University of Science and Technology and graduated in 1982, then he had a master's degree from the Cairo University in 2000, and a PhD from the Sudan University in 2008.

Known as Captain Kabo, he is considered the pioneer of theater of deaf people in Sudan and won the Award for Superior Performance of the Spanish Festival of the Deaf in 2003.

Al-Taher died from COVID-19 on 1 January 2021, during the COVID-19 pandemic in Sudan.

== See also ==
- Fadel Saeed
