= Nafisah Ahmad al-Amin =

Sudanese politician

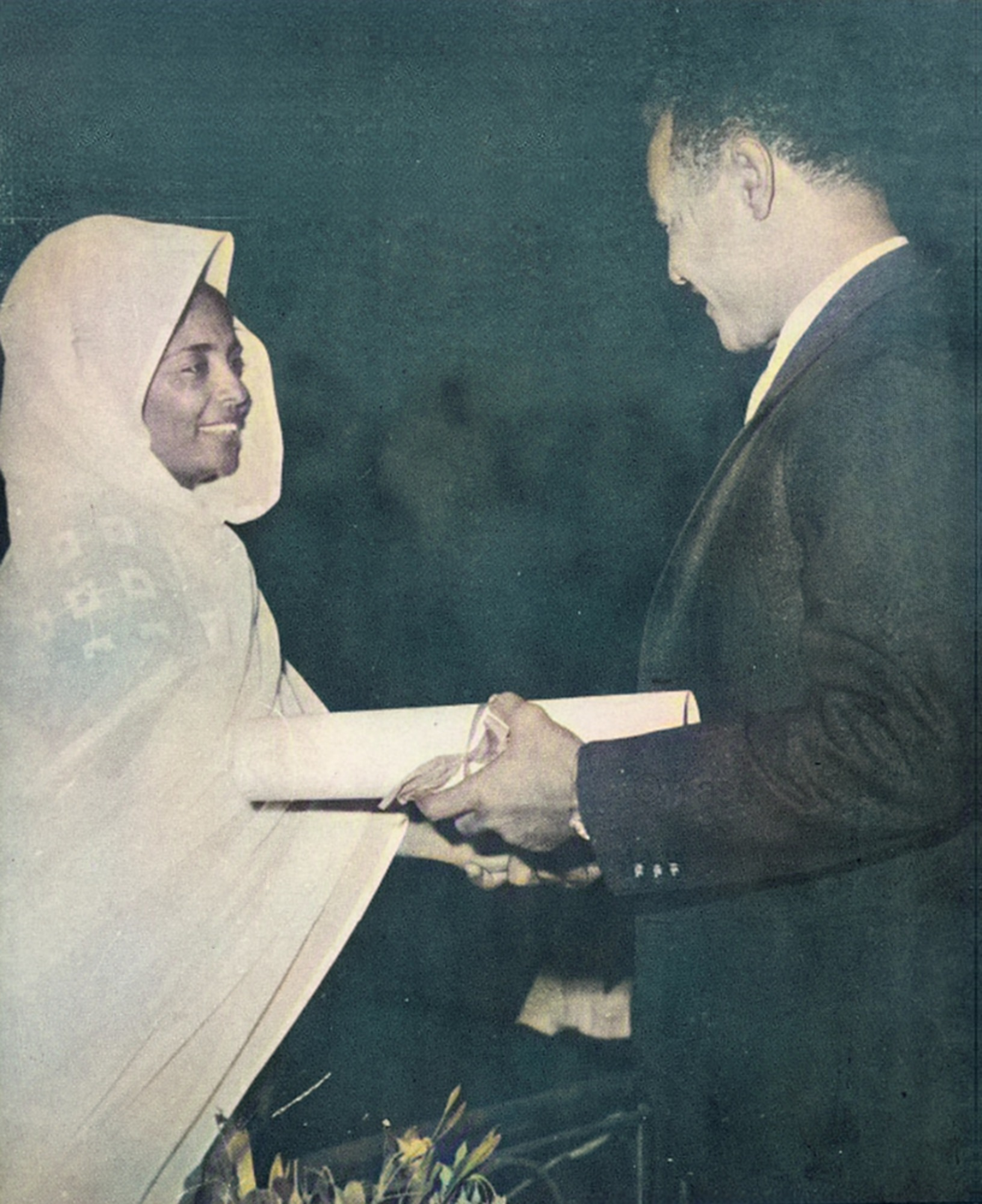

Deputy Minister of Youth and Sport from 1971 to 1972
- President: President of The Sudanese Women’s Association UK
- Minister: First women cabinet minister

Personal details
- Citizenship: Sudan
- Education: Teachers College, Omdurman
- Occupation: Politician
- Awards: Honorary doctorate by the Ahfad university.
- Website: https://womensliteracysudan.blog/2025/01/09/daughter-of-light/

Nafisah Ahmad al-Amin, also spelled Nafissa Ahmed el-Amin, is a former Sudanese politician and activist for women's rights. She served as Deputy Minister of Youth and Sport from 1971 to 1972. She was the first woman cabinet minister in Sudan and one of the founding members of the Sudanese Women's Union.

== Publications ==
- The Sudanese woman throughout the history of her struggle (1972). Khartoum: Government Press
- A history of Sudanese women organizations and the strive for liberation and empowerment (2001)

== Literature ==
- Hale, Sondra (1997). Gender Politics in Sudan: Islamism, Socialism, and the State. Routledge. ISBN 978-0-429-96880-8.
