= Hajja Kashif Badri =

Sudanese women's right activist

- Born: 1933; Omdurman, Sudan
- Died: 2018 (aged 84–85)
- Education: University of Khartoum; Cairo University
- Known for: Work in Sudanese Feminine movement
- Spouse: Ali Altoam
- Children: Akram Ali Altoam

Hajja Kashif Badri (1933–2018) was a pioneer in Sudanese feminist movements and was a political activist who worked to increase awareness of women's issues and enhance women's positions in the country.

== Early life and education ==
Hajja Kashif Badri was born and raised in Omdurman, near Khartoum and attended the Omdurman Secondary School. She went on to graduate from the University of Khartoum in 1956 and then earned an MA in history from Cairo University, Egypt.

== Activism ==
She grew up in an educated family that allowed women to enjoy an unusual amount of liberty and this encouraged her to become an activist and pursue the rights of women. She worked in "the state ministry of information and as a teacher, often writing in the press about women's causes." She was one of the founding members (with Fatima Talib Ismaeil) of the Sudanese Women's Union in 1952, which was started with the goal of "creating a strong and effective movement to serve the family, working women, school girls, and in particular emphasis was on rural women. The main demands of the Union were focused on their social, economic and civil rights." The organization won the United Nations Prize in the Field of Human Rights in 1998 for its literacy campaigns among women in the Sudan. In 1956, she founded a monthly cultural magazine called al-Qafila, but it quickly ceased publication.

== Political career ==
She was chairwoman of the Sudanese Social Welfare Council as a cabinet minister. (Her husband also held a government position as former Agriculture Minister Ali Altoam and her son, Dr. Akram Ali Altoam, became Sudan's Minister of Health, after the December Revolution, in 2019.)

== International appointment ==
She was General Secretary of the National Commission for UNESCO and was a founding member of the Sudanese Red Crescent.

== Selected works ==
Badri's first name is sometimes spelled Haga.

- Badri, Haga K. Al-ḥarakah Al-Nisāʼīyah Fī Al-Sūdān. al-Kharṭūm: Dār Jāmiʻat al-Kharṭūm, 1984. Print.
- Badri, Haga K. Women's Movement in the Sudan. New Delhi: Asia News Agency, 1986. Print.
- Badri, Haga K. My Experience As a Female Researcher. New Delhi, 1987. Print.
