= Abdul-Haleem Ismail Al-Mutaafi =

Sudan public servant

Dr. Abdelhalim Almutafi served as the Minister of Agriculture of Sudan between 2008 and 2013. Dr. Almutafi was born in 1954 AD in Al-Duweim, White Nile State, and graduated from the Faculty of Medicine, University of Khartoum. Between 1990 and 2013, Dr. Almutafi held a number of important public service positions, including: Minister of Finance of the Red Sea State, Governor of the Red Sea State, Governor of Sennar State, Governor of South Darfur State, Governor of White Nile, State, Federal Minister of Trade, Federal Minister of Industry, and Federal Minister of Agriculture. He also represented the Government of Sudan's interests in various corporates and multilateral organisations, including Kenana Sugar Company, Ariab Mining Company, and the Arab Authority for Agricultural Investment and Development (AAAID).
