= Philiswa Nomngongo =

South African chemist

Philiswa Nosizo Nomngongo
- Born: Flagstaff, South Africa
- Education: University of KwaZulu-Natal (BSc, BSc (Hons), MSc); University of Johannesburg (PhD)
- Awards: L'Oreal-UNESCO Sub-Saharan Women (2014); South African Women in Science (2017); Vice-Chancellor's Distinguished Award (2017); NSTF's Engineering Research Capacity Development Award (2021)
- Scientific career
- Fields: Applied Chemistry; Analytical chemistry
- Workplaces: University of Johannesburg
- Thesis: Amperometric Determination of Selected Persistent Organic Pollutants and Heavy Metals Using Horseradish Peroxidase Biosensor

Philiswa Nomngongo is a South African professor of Analytical Chemistry and the South African Research Chair (SARChI) in nanotechnology for water. Her research focuses on environmental analytical chemistry and the use of nanomaterials for water treatment, water remediation, and water quality analysis and monitoring.

== Early life and education ==
Nomngongo was raised in Flagstaff, South Africa in the Eastern Cape. Nomngongo grew up observing how her village was dependent on rivers and streams for clean water, and how this water was a source for water-borne illnesses. Nomngongo cites this as helping her find her passion for chemistry while in high school.

Nomngongo majored in Applied Chemistry at the University of KwaZulu-Natal, graduating with a BSc in 2008. She received an Honours BSc in Chemistry in 2009 and a MSc in Chemistry in 2011, both from the University of KwaZulu-Natal. She earned her PhD in Chemistry from the University of Johannesburg in 2014.

== Research and career ==
In 2017, Nomngongo became an associate professor of Environmental Analytical Chemistry at the University of Johannesburg in the Faculty of Science (Department of Chemical Sciences). She became a full professor in 2020.

Nomngongo's studies focus on using nanotechnology to build better water filtering and quality monitoring techniques for use in remote communities. She credits the "flexibility and distinct properties [of] nanomaterials" in developing new technologies for water remediation. Nomngongo's research has also explored better methods of detecting contaminants from pharmaceutical wastewater, which can evade removal from regular water treatment plants. Her work is cited as helping to "improve the quality of life" for communities dependent on water from potentially contaminated water sources.

Nomngongo provides teaching and training to disadvantaged rural schools, and has been recognized for her promotion of STEM studies.

In 2021, the South African Department of Science and Innovation appointed Nomngongo as the South African Research Chair in nanotechnology for water. In this role, Nomngongo is tasked to help train the next generation of students and researchers on using nanotechnology to further improve water security.

== Awards and honors ==
- L'Oreal-UNESCO Sub-Saharan Women in Science Regional fellowship in 2014
- South African Women in Science award in the Distinguished Young Woman Research in the Natural and Engineering Sciences category in 2017
- Vice-Chancellor's Distinguished Award: Most Promising Young Researcher of the Year in 2017
- NSTF's Engineering Research Capacity Development Award in 2021
- James J. Morgan Early Career Award: for early-career researchers making outstanding contributions to the field of environmental science and technology in 2025
