= Fatima Talib =

Sudanese educator and women's rights activist

- Born: January 1st 1928
- Citizenship: Sundan
- Education: Gordon Memorial college
- Occupation: Activist

Fatima Talib (Arabic: فاطِمة طالِب, born 1 January 1928) is a Sudanese educator and women's rights activist who convened the first women-only organisation in Sudan.

== Activism ==
In 1948, with her friends and colleagues at Gordon Memorial College, Mahasin Abed Alaal and Khalda Zahir, Talib founded the Young Women's Cultural Society (Jam'ee'yat alfata'yat althaqa'fia) in Omdurman. The society was designed to educate and empower women and provide social support for them. In order to function, the society needed the support of the British authorities, so was advertised solely as a social concern, however it had political undertones. Nine women joined immediately, but the society only lasted for two years. Despite its short life, it is important as it was the first women-only organisation to be established in Sudan.

In 1949, Talib became the first female member of the Muslim Brotherhood. She was joined by sisters from the Al-Mahdi family and together they founded the Women’s Development Society.

In 1952, with Khalda Zahir, Hajja Kashif Badri, and others, Talib founded the Sudanese Women's Union (الاتحاد النسائي السوداني al Etihaad al Nisaa'i alSudani). This organisation was designed to unite and promote women's issues. The first executive committee was made up of Fatima Talib Isma'il, Khalida Zahir and Fatima Ahmed Ibrahim. Talib was President of the Union from 1952-6. The establishment of the Union was one of the most important events in the struggle against colonialism in Sudan. It enabled women to mobilise to understand and protect their social, economic and civil rights. It was set up under pan-Africanist and socialist ideologies.

== Early life ==
Talib was born on 1 January 1928 in Al-Rank, in southern Sudan. Her father was an army officer who was one of the leaders in the 1924 revolution. She was educated at Unity High School in Khartoum and from there was the first woman from Sudan to obtain a degree London University.

== Career ==
Talib was the first woman in Sudan to become the headmistress of a secondary school. During her career she worked in Yemen, delivering plans for women's education. In 2004, Talib was interviewed about her role in Sudanese feminism.
