= Muddathir Abdel-Rahim =

Sudanese political scientist and human rights scholar (born 1932)

Muddathir Abdel-Rahim Eltayeb
- Arabic: مدثّر عبد الرحيم الطيّب
- Born: 1932 (age 93–94); Ad-Damar, Anglo-Egyptian Sudan
- Known for: Founding the Sudanese National Committee for Human Rights

Academic background
- Education: University College Khartoum; University of Nottingham; University of Manchester
- Thesis: Imperialism and nationalism in the Sudan: a study in constitutional and political development, 1899–1956

Muddathir Abdel-Rahim (Arabic: مدّثر عبد الرحيم الطيّب; born 1932, Ad-Damar, Anglo-Egyptian Sudan) is a Sudanese political scientist, diplomat, and academic. Over a career spanning more than six decades, he has contributed to political science, Islamic studies, and international human rights. He is credited with establishing one of the earliest human rights organisations in the Muslim world and participated in the drafting of landmark United Nations human rights instruments in the 1960s.

== Early life and education ==
Abdel-Rahim was born into the Al-Majadheeb family of Ad-Damar, a lineage associated with Islamic Sufism and classical Arabic scholarship. His early education combined traditional Quranic schooling (khalwa), where he studied the Quran, while he had modern instruction in natural sciences, mathematics, and English in Wadi Sayidna Secondary School.

During his secondary years at Wadi Seidna school, he co-founded a religious and literary society in response to the spread of Marxist and anti-religious ideas among students.

He graduated from University College Khartoum (then affiliated with the University of London) with a Bachelor of Arts in 1955. He subsequently studied at the University of Nottingham, graduating with First-Class Honours in Economics and Political Science in 1958. In 1964, he received his Ph.D. from the University of Manchester, with a thesis titled Imperialism and Nationalism in the Sudan: a study in constitutional and political development, 1899–1956.

== Career ==
=== Academic career ===
Abdel-Rahim commenced teaching Political Science at the University of Khartoum in July 1958 and became the founding Head of the Department of Political Science there in the 1960s. Between 1960 and 1965 he also taught at the University of Manchester.

Following the 1969 Sudanese coup d'état led by Jaafar Nimeiri, he was among a number of academics dismissed from the University of Khartoum on political grounds. This led to an extended international academic career at institutions including Makerere University (Uganda), Mohammed V University (Morocco), Bayero University Kano (Nigeria), Northern Illinois University, and Temple University (United States), where he was a colleague of Islamic scholar Ismail al-Faruqi.

From 1988 to 1991, he served as Vice-Chancellor of Omdurman Islamic University, during which he established faculties of Medicine, Engineering, and Agriculture — disciplines initially opposed by some faculty who regarded them as outside the scope of an Islamic university.

He subsequently moved to Malaysia, serving as Professor of Political Science and Islamic Studies and Academic Fellow at ISTAC from 1997 to 2013. He then served as Distinguished Professor and Head of the Human Rights Program at the Islamic University Malaysia (UIM) from 2013 to 2016.

=== Diplomacy and human rights ===
As a Sudanese delegate to the United Nations General Assembly in the 1960s, Abdel-Rahim participated in debates leading to the adoption of the International Convention on the Elimination of All Forms of Racial Discrimination (1965), the International Covenant on Civil and Political Rights (1966), and the International Covenant on Economic, Social and Cultural Rights (1966). In 1967, he contributed to drafting UNESCO's Third Statement on Race and Racial Prejudice.

Also in 1967, he became a founding member and Secretary-General of the Sudanese National Committee for Human Rights, established in Khartoum — described as the first organisation of its kind in the Muslim world.

He served as Sudan's Ambassador to Sweden, Norway, Denmark, and Finland from 1974 to 1975, and as a UNESCO Senior Expert in Social Sciences, in charge of the Research and Human Resource Development Program at CAFRAD, in Tangier, Morocco, from 1971 to 1973.

=== Notable encounters ===
In 1964, Abdel-Rahim introduced Malcolm X in his talk at the University of Manchester. The event was organized by the Muslim Students Society of Manchester, supported by FOSIS. He engaged Malcom X in dialogue regarding his earlier position that Islam was a religion exclusively for Black and non-white people. Following the lecture, Malcolm X reportedly confided to Abdel-Rahim that he expected to be assassinated.

For his research on Sudanese political history, he conducted interviews with prominent figures including Sayed Abd al-Rahman al-Mahdi, Sayed Ali al-Mirghani, and politician Ahmed Kheir.

== Publications ==
- Imperialism and Nationalism in the Sudan (Oxford University Press, 1969).
- Human Rights in Theory and Practice (Dar al-Fikr, Beirut, 1968).
- The Problem of Southern Sudan (1970).
- Islam in the Sudan (Dar al-Asala, Cairo, 1998).
- Islam in Africa (Dar al-Fikr, Damascus, 2001).
- The Human Rights Tradition in Islam, volume three of Human Rights and the World's Major Religions (Greenwood Publishing Group, 2005).
- Al-Ghazzali's Political Thought: Its Nature and Contemporary Significance and Other Essays on Hujjatul Islam (IIUM, Malaysia, 2011).

In addition, he has published a number of articles in learned journals in Arabic and English, and several of his works have been translated into other languages.

=== Selected critical reception ===
On Imperialism and Nationalism in the Sudan:

"The best work on the development of Sudanese nationalism yet published."

— Richard Hill, Africa

"This is an important contribution, not only to the history of the Sudan, but also to the whole struggle between European imperialism and the nationalism it begot in Africa and Asia."

— The Economist

On The Human Rights Tradition in Islam:

"...the author is as learned as he is realistic and frank."

— Murad Wilfried Hofmann, Muslim World Book Review (2008)

== Honours ==
- Jordanian Royal Medal for Distinguished Contributions (August 2013)
- "Personality of the Year", Sudanese Ministry of Culture, awarded at the Khartoum International Book Fair (18 October 2019)
