= Abdallah Muhammed at-Tom =

Sudanese politician

Abdallah Muhammed at-Tom (Arabic: عبد الله محمد التوم) was a Sudanese politician. He was a sheikh of the Arakiyin. He was a substantial tenant farmer on the Gezira scheme. In the 1953 legislative election he was elected to the House of Representatives from Wad Madani as a National Unionist Party candidate.
