= Khalida Zahir =

Sudanese physician and women's rights activist (1927–2015)

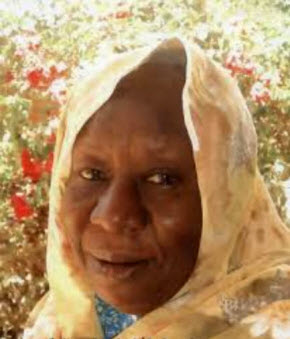
- Born: January 18, 1927; Almorada, Omdurman
- Died: June 9, 2015 (aged 88)
- Occupations: Physician, political activist
- Known for: Being one of the first women to practise medicine in Sudan; founding the Sudanese Women's Union
- Spouse: Osman Mohamed Mahgoub (married 1952)
- Children: 4

Khalida Zahir (Arabic: خالدة زاهر; 18 January 1927 – 9 June 2015), also recorded as Khalda Zahir, was a Sudanese doctor and women's rights activist. She is best remembered as one of the first two women to become physicians in colonial Sudan, alongside her classmate Zarouhi Sarkissian, and for co-founding the Sudanese Women's Union.

== Early life and education ==
Zahir, the first child of her parents, was born in Almorada, Omdurman to mother Fatima Ajab Arbab and father Zahir Surour Assadati (also recorded as Elsadati). From her parents and her father's eventual second marriage, Zahir would later have eighteen siblings.

Assadati, a member of the Sudan Defence Force, had participated in the first organised resistance against British colonial rule in 1924. He had been raised by a single mother, as his father had died in the Battle of Omdurman on the same day that Assadati was born. Having grown up with a respect for women due to his upbringing, Assadati worked to ensure his daughter received the same opportunities as his sons, including receiving a secondary education; his attitude was unusual among Sudanese men for the time.

Zahir attended Unity High School in Khartoum, where she was a contemporary of Zarouhi Sarkissian. Unity High School primarily educated the children of foreigners, and Zahir's attendance at the institution was met with disapproval by the family's neighbours. Some acquaintances of the family wrote letters to Zahir's father, urging him to encourage her to end her education and become a teacher, as she was already too "outspoken." The pressure did not sway Assadati.

== Medical education ==
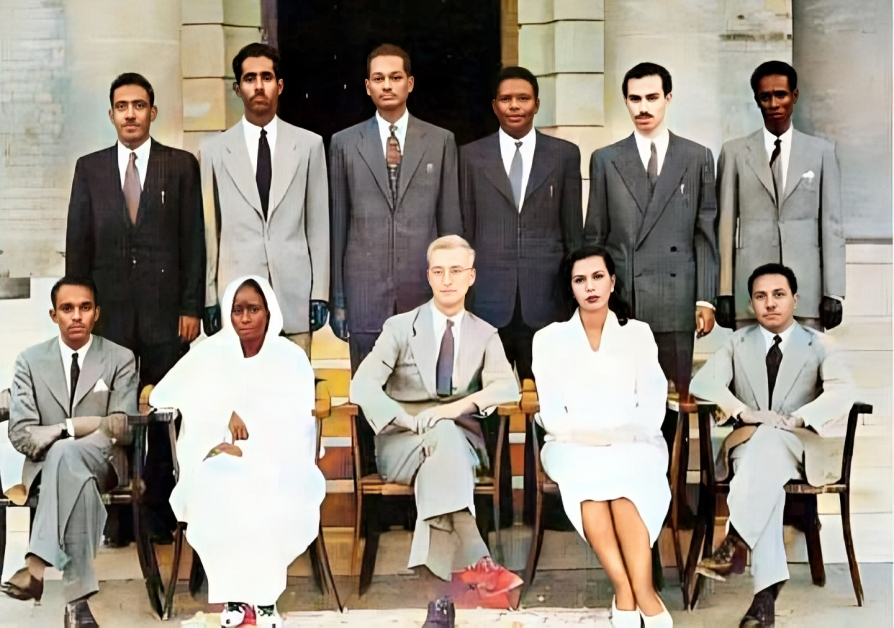
Kitchener School of Medicine graduates, 1952. Seated: Khalida Zahir (second from left) and Zarouhi Sarkissian (second from right).

Through the efforts of progressive teachers at Unity High School, Zahir's academic promise reached the attention of relatives of Stewart Symes, Sudan's colonial governor-general. After Symes' family lobbied for Zahir to be admitted to the Kitchener School of Medicine (now the University of Khartoum), Zahir enrolled alongside Sarkissian in 1946. They graduated together in 1952, sharing the distinction of becoming Sudan's first woman physicians. Zahir completed postgraduate studies in the United Kingdom and Slovakia, specializing in paediatrics.

=== Student activism ===
Soon after enrolling, Sarkissian and Zahir became active in student politics. They participated in the university's first demonstration in favour of Sudanese independence from foreign rule. Though they also shared an interest in feminist causes, Zahir was the most active of the two in political spheres, beginning with her participation in the school's students' union.

In her first year at the Kitchener School, Zahir and classmate Fatima Talib co-founded the Young Women's Cultural Society. In order for colonial authorities to permit its operations, the society presented itself as a social and cultural association that promoted ostensible women's interest activities like dressmaking. The society's true objectives included hosting lectures on women's liberation, providing literacy classes for women, and establishing a kindergarten that later became a primary school in 1970.

Also in 1946, Zahir attended a public protest against British rule. She was arrested, thus becoming the first woman in modern Sudanese history to be arrested on political grounds. By some accounts, she was flogged by colonial authorities during this incident; in others, she was released from detention after a few hours.

After beginning to participate in the activities of the Sudanese Communist Party in the late 1940s, Zahir became the first Sudanese woman to join a political party in 1949. In 1952, Zahir, Fatima Talib, and Fatima Ahmed Ibrahim founded the Sudanese Women's Union to promote the rights of women to work and vote. Ibrahim, who went on to become Sudan's first female member of parliament in 1965, considered Zahir to be a mentor.

== Career and later politics ==
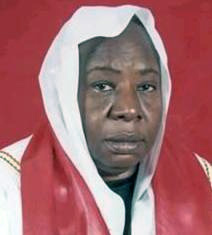
Zahir pictured in later life.

After qualifying as a physician, Zahir worked at hospitals in Omdurman and Khartoum. She moved to Bahr el Ghazal in 1952 with her husband, where she began working as the province's medical inspector and he took up a position as a secondary school teacher.

Zahir also operated her own medical clinic, where she treated lower-income patients free of charge and delivered the polio vaccine to children during the 1960s. She served as head of paediatrics at the Ministry of Health from the mid-1970s until she retired in 1986.

=== Activities with the Sudanese Women's Union ===
The Sudanese Women's Union (SWU), of which Zahir was a founding member, was successful in achieving equal pay for women in Sudan in 1953. The SWU was also successful in eliminating 'obedience laws' that forced women to return to abusive partners.

Although Zahir was concerned with the custom of female genital mutilation (FGM) in the country, night schools for women opened by the SWU during the 1950s intentionally did not focus on convincing students to end the practice. Zahir believed that, had the SWU's classes "focused on eradicating female circumcision... people [would] have been very suspicious of [the SWU's] motives," owing to the ritual's deep-rooted cultural presence. Instead, Zahir viewed FGM as "a symptom, not a cause of women's subordination," and believed the practice would end as greater strides were made in improving "poverty, illiteracy, and exploitation" of women. The SWU also began publishing a magazine in 1955 that exposed readers to debate surrounding FGM and other traditional practices: Sawt al-Mara ("Voice of the Women").

=== October revolution ===
In October 1964, mounting opposition to Sudanese president Ibrahim Abboud's military regime culminated in the police killing of a student during a protest at Khartoum University. Mass protests occurred throughout Sudan, including a demonstration on the 28th that saw peaceful protestors march towards the presidential palace. Zahir led the rally, which consisted predominantly of educated and professional citizens, holding hands with judge Abd al-Majid Imam to indicate the demonstration's peaceful nature to palace guards. Nonetheless, the guards opened fire on the protest, killing and injuring attendees.

=== Recognition ===
In 2001, the University of Khartoum awarded Zahir an honorary doctorate in recognition of her medical and political achievements.

== Personal life ==
Shortly after enrolling at the Kitchener School of Medicine in 1946, Zahir became acquainted with a friend of her brother's, Osman Mohamed Mahgoub. It was through Mahgoub and his social circle that Zahir became involved with the Sudanese Communist Party. Mahgoub proposed in 1952, which Zahir accepted, despite ethnic tensions between their families: Zahir was of Fur ancestry, while Mahgoub's family hailed from the Shaigiya tribe. Their love match marriage was encouraged by Zahir's parents, and lasted until his death.

Together they had two daughters, Suad and Maryam, and two sons, Ahmed and Khalid.

== Death ==
Zahir died on 9 June 2015.

== In the media ==
Zahir's story features prominently in the documentary Heroic Bodies (2022).
