= Omotunde E. G. Johnson =

Sierra Leone academic

- Born: 1941 (age 84–85); Freetown
- Citizenship: Sierra Leone
- Education: UCLA
- Occupation: economist
- Employer: IMF

Omotunde E. G. Johnson (born 1941), is a senior research associate at the African Center for Economic Transformation. He previously worked as a consultant with the International Monetary Fund on central banking and financial sector issues.

== Early life and education ==
Born in Freetown to Creole parents, Johnson was educated at the Sierra Leone Grammar School. He later emigrated to the United States in 1962 to further his studies. Johnson is an alumnus of UCLA where he obtained his bachelor's, master's and doctoral degrees between 1961 and 1970. All degrees are in economics.

== Career ==
Johnson worked as a researcher and consultant with the IMF on a diverse range of issues related to countries in the Caribbean and Africa. He engaged in scholarly works and published extensively while at the African Center for Economic Transformation. Johnson also taught at the University of Sierra Leone and the University of Michigan. He is a Senior Associate Member at St Antony's College, University of Oxford .

== Books authored ==
- Johnson, Omotunde E. G.. Trade, Exchange Rate and Financial Policy Coordination in the. N.p., International Monetary Fund, 1986.
- Johnson, Omotunde E. G.. Financial Market Countraints and Private Investment in a Developing Country. N.p., International Monetary Fund, 1990.
- Johnson, Omotunde E. G.. Economic Analysis and the Structure of Land Rights in the Sierra Leone Provinces. United States, University Microfilms, 1980.
- Johnson, Omotunde E. G.. Financial Sector Development in African Countries: Major Policy Making Issues. Germany, Springer International Publishing, 2020.
- Johnson, Omotunde E. G.. Dancing with Trouble: A Novel on African Leadership. United States, Langdon Street Press, 2013.
- Johnson, Omotunde E. G.. Economic Diversification and Growth in Africa: Critical Policy Making Issues. Germany, Springer International Publishing, 2016.
- Johnson, Omotunde E. G. Economic Challenges and Policy Issues in Early Twenty-First-Century Sierra Leone. United Kingdom, London Publishing Partnership, 2012.

== Selected publications ==
- Johnson, O.E.G. (1972). "Economic analysis, the legal framework and land tenure systems". The Journal of Law and Economics. 15 (1). The University of Chicago Law School: 259–275. doi:10.1086/466736. S2CID 153516814.
- Johnson, Omotunde.E.G. (1975). "Payment Systems, Monetary Policy and the Role of the Central Bank". Kyklos. 28 (1). Wiley Online Library: 47–61. doi:10.1111/j.1467-6435.1975.tb01933.x.
- Johnson, Omotunde.E.G.; Destresse, Jean-Marc; Roberts, Nicholas; Swinburne, Mark; Lybek, Tonny; Abrams, Richard K (1998). "Payment Systems, Monetary Policy and the Role of the Central Bank". 28 (1). International monetary fund: 47–61.
- Johnson, O.E.G. (1972). "Money and Monetary Policy in Less Developed Countries". 11 (3). Elsevier: 549–560.
