= Abd ul-Hamid Musa Madibbo =

Sudanese politician

Abd ul-Hamid Musa Madibbo (Arabic: عبد الحميد موسى ماديبو) was a Sudanese politician. He served as an accountant for the Rizeigat. In the 1953 legislative election he was elected to the House of Representatives from Nyala Baggara East as a Socialist Republican Party candidate. He was the brother of the nazir of the Rizeigat.
