= Sudanese Women's Union =

Women's rights and advocacy organization

- الاتحاد النسائي السوداني
- Founded: 1952
- Founders: Fatima Ahmed Ibrahim, Fatima Talib, Khalida Zahir, Mihasin Al Jailani
- Purpose: women's rights
- Region served: Sudan

The Sudanese Women's Union (SWU, Arabic: الاتحاد النسائي السوداني, transliteration: Aletahad Elnisa'i Assodani) is a Sudanese women's rights organisation that is one of the biggest post-independence women's rights organisations in Africa.

== Creation ==
The Sudanese Women's Union (SWU) was created in 1952 during the struggle for independence from Britain, with Fatima Talib, Khalida Zahir and Fatima Ahmed Ibrahim forming the executive committee. The first president of the Union was Fatima Talib. In 1956, Fatima Ahmed Ibrahim was elected president of the SWU. Khalida Zahir was elected president in 1958.

=== Founding Committee ===
The 17 January 1952 founding meeting of the SWU included the following leadership and founding members.

President – Fatima Talib

Secretary – Nafisah Ahmad al-Amin

Members – Khalda Zahir, Thuryia Al Dirdeiri, Nafisa Al Mileik, Suad Al Fatih Al Badawi, Batoul Adham, Thuryia Umbabi, Suad Abdel Rahman, Hajja Kashif Badri, Azziza Meki, Khadmalla Osman, Fatima Abdel Rahman, Suad Abdel Aal, Fatima Ahmed Ibrahim, Khadija Mohamed Mustafa, Mihasin Al Jailani.

== 1952–1989 ==
The SWU was Pan-Africanist in its early years. It organised women's solidarity actions for women and against apartheid in Zambia, South Africa and Namibia; in protest against the 1961 execution of Patrice Lumumba in the Republic of the Congo; in protest against the arrest of Djamila Bouhired, an Algerian anti-colonial activist who in 2019 participated in 2019 Algerian street protests; and in support of Palestinian women activists.

In Sudan, the SWU campaigned in favour of girls' education during the British colonial period in which education was only organised for a small minority of boys and the British authorities opposed formal education for girls. The SWU created schools for girls in Khartoum and Omdurman and in 1970 organised an international conference against women's illiteracy that was attended by many women's organisations from around Africa. The SWU created evening classes for adult women, encouraging literacy and women's health education and opposing underage and forced marriages.

The SWU also campaigned for polygamy to be regulated; for the right to consent to marriage; against laws requiring abused women to return to their husbands; for women's employment, for equal pay, and against discrimination against "Africans".

After Sudanese women gained electoral rights in the October 1964 Sudanese Revolution, Fatima Ahmed Ibrahim became, in 1965, the first woman elected as a member of the Sudanese parliament (at the time called the Constitutional Assembly) and, according to author Caitlin Davies and Middle East Monitor, the first woman member of any African parliament.

The post-1964 prime minister Gaafar Nimeiry banned the SWU and Fatima Ahmed Ibrahim was held under house arrest for two years.

Campaigning by the SWU and other feminists continued during the 1960s and 70s and led to improvements in family law and equal rights for men and women in the 1973 Constitution.

== 1989–2018 ==
The SWU (along with many other citizens' associations) was officially dissolved in 1989 when Omar al-Bashir took power in a coup d'état. The SWU continued to operate unofficially. Fatima Ahmed Ibrahim, in exile in London, created a London branch of the SWU.

On 13 July 2012, the SWU together with other citizens' groups organised protests in cities in Sudan against the repression of demonstrators and against the torture and abuses of female activists by the National Intelligence and Security Service (NISS).

== Sudanese Revolution ==
In August 2019, during the Sudanese transition to democracy period that followed the first 2018–2019 civil disobedience, coup and massacre phases of the Sudanese Revolution, the SWU argued that since women had played as significant a role in the revolution as men, positions chosen by civilian–military consensus in the Cabinet of Ministers should be allotted equally between men and women, stating that Sudanese women "claim an equal share of 50–50 with men at all levels, measured by qualifications and capabilities".

== Awards ==
The SWU was awarded the United Nations Prize in the Field of Human Rights in 1993, along with eight other groups and individuals.

== See also ==
- No to Oppression against Women Initiative
- MANSAM
