= Aisha Fofana Ibrahim =

Women's rights activist and scientist from Sierra Leone

- Born: Aisha; 20. Century
- Citizenship: Sierra Leone
- Occupation: scientist Activist feminist
- Employer: University of Sierra Leone's Fourah Bay College Carleton University

Aisha Fofana Ibrahim is a Sierra Leonean activist, feminist scholar, researcher and practitioner in Gender and Development.

== Career ==
She teaches gender studies at the graduate level, and promotes women's empowerment through advocacy. As a gender activist, her current advocacy focus is on increased representation of women in decision making and leadership, and in ensuring that a new and revised Sierra Leone constitution addresses the marginalization of women. Her current academic research focus is on gender and artisan mining, and the impact of Ebola on women and girls. She also works on violence against women, women's political participation and women's narratives and auto/biographical writings. She seats as chairperson or member, on several boards in Sierra Leone, including: The African Young Voice Media Empire (AYV), Rainbo initiative, Brac Sierra Leone and the Institute for Governance Reform (IGR).

Ibrahim was the Ebola and Constitutional Review Commission president of the 50/50 Group (Sierra Leone) between 2013 and 2015, a prominent civil society organization in Sierra Leone that focuses on ensuring women's equal political representation, and promoting gender equality in Sierra Leone.

== Organisational affiliations ==
- University of Sierra Leone's Fourah Bay College: Ibrahim is the director of the Gender Research and Documentation Centre at the University of Sierra Leone's Fourah Bay College.
- The North-South Institute: In 2009–2010, she was the Helleiner Visiting Research Fellow at The North-South Institute, an IDRC-funded fellowship. While at The North-South Institute, Ibrahim's work focused on affirmative action as a means to overcome barriers that limit women's entry into politics.
- 50/50 Group of Sierra Leone: Aisha serves as president of the 50/50 Group of Sierra Leone, which focuses on advocacy, policy, and capacity building for women's leadership.
- Carleton University: Ibrahim is described by Carleton University as "feminist scholar and activist and one of Sierra Leone's foremost scholars and practitioners in Gender and Development. She is the immediate past Director for the Institute for Gender Research and Documentation (INGRADOC) at Fourah Bay College, University of Sierra Leone."
