= Abdigani Diriye =

Somali computer scientist and research scientist

- Born: 1986 (age 39–40)
- Education: Queen Mary University of London; King's College London; University College London
- Scientific career
- Fields: Computer Science
- Workplaces: Carnegie Mellon University
- Thesis: Search interfaces for known-item and exploratory search tasks (2012)
- Doctoral advisor: Prof. Ann Blandford; Dr. Anastasios Tombros

Abdigani Diriye (born 1986) is a Somali computer scientist and research scientist at IBM Research – Africa, working in the fields of human-computer interaction (HCI), data mining and financial technology (FinTech). Diriye was named a TEDGlobal 2017 fellow, an MIT Technology Review 'Innovator Under 35', and a 'Next Einstein Forum' fellow.

== Education ==
Abdigani Diriye was schooled in the United Kingdom, moving from Somalia at age 5 due to civil unrest. Diriye received a Bachelor's degree in Computer science and Mathematics from Queen Mary University of London. Continuing onto the postgraduate level, Diriye earned a Master's in Advanced Computing from King's College London, a PhD in Computer Science at University College London in 2012 and an MBA from INSEAD in 2022.

== Research and career ==
Under the guidance of Prof. Ann Blandford and Dr. Anastasios Tombros, Diriye conducted his PhD research on understanding the role searching interfaces play in the process of information seeking.

Diriye, during his PhD, undertook internships with Microsoft Research (June 2010 - October 2011) and Fuji-Xerox Palo Alto labs (June 2011).

Following his PhD, Diriye worked as a post-doctoral researcher at the Human-Computer Interaction Institute at Carnegie Mellon University. This position, working with Dr. Aniket Kittur led Diriye to develop new approaches that combine human and machine-generated data that helps people find and understand information on the internet more effectively.

Currently Diriye is a research scientist and manager at IBM Research Africa and steers Innovate Ventures: a startup technology fund in Somalia, having founded it in 2012. With Innovate Ventures, Diriye has partnered with Oxfam, VC4Africa, and Telesom. Diriye, through Innovate Ventures, has funded over $17,500 towards startups in Africa.

With IBM, Diriye and his team develop and deploy new approaches to securely mine, model and score individuals who are applying for financial loans. In 2016, Diriye and his team developed a machine learning approach that leverages new data sources to evaluate financial profiles and credit scores of hundreds of millions of Africans.

Over his career, Diriye has published over 35 patents and papers.

== Awards ==
- TEDGlobal 2017
- Next Einstein Fellow (NEF) 2017-2019
- MIT Technology Review 'TR35' 2017
- Quartz Africa Innovators 2018
