= Unity High School (Sudan) =

Private school in Khartoum, Sudan

Coordinates: 15°36′02″N 32°31′46″E

- Khartoum, Sudan

Information
- Type: Private
- Established: 1902
- Closed: 2025
- Principal: Marshall Morgan
- Enrollment: 750 (approx.)
- Color: Blue
- Nickname: UHS, Unity
- Website: unityhighschool.org

Unity High School was an independent multi-denominational co-educational private school in Khartoum, Sudan, which used the English language and provided a British-style education to children from 4 to 18 years of age. It opened as an all-girls school in 1902, and in its last form has a history that originates from 1928. Unity High was situated in the center of Khartoum prior to its apparent destruction, burning, and sacking during the battle of Khartoum as part of the wider Sudanese civil war.

== History ==
The school was founded in 1902 as an all-girls school and was originally called the Coptic Girls School. In the preceding years, the Coptic community in Khartoum had established a boys' school but lacked the resources to found a girls' school. Some Coptic families then approached the Anglican missionary Llwellyn Gwynne (who later became Bishop of Khartoum) for help and the Coptic Girls School was opened in 1902 but changed its name to the Church Missionary Society Khartoum Girls School in 1903. In 1928 the Church Missionary Society school closed and the land reverted to Bishop Gwynne who with the support of four local Christian communities and the financial help of Christian merchants, then opened the Unity High School for Girls.

An Old Girls Association was formed in 1928. In 1948 Margo Iskinazi, a Jewish girl who was a student, at the Unity High, noted that there were Egyptian Copts, Sudanese Muslims, Greek Orthodox and Armenian Christians among her classmates. Unity High School became co-educational in 1985.

The principal before 2008 was Dr Marina Hitchen. It had Mrs Stephanie King as a vice principal from the year 2008 onwards, the director of the School was Mr Robert Boulos and the principal was Richard Woods. In 2019, it had an enrollment of some 630 pupils and the current principal (since August 2019) is Fiona Beevers.

In 2025, video would be released on Instagram by an account under the username “@sowasudan” showing the school’s apparent destruction, potentially as part of scorched earth tactics and indiscriminate destruction on behalf of the retreating Rapid Support Forces following the victory of the Sudanese military in the Battle of Khartoum.

== Teddy bear blasphemy case ==
On 25 November 2007 the school came to international attention when one of its teachers was arrested by Sudanese authorities for allegedly insulting Islam by allowing the children in her class to name a teddy bear "Muhammad".

The school was closed until January 2008 for the safety of pupils and staff as reprisals were feared.

== Notable former pupils ==
Angela Isaac and Khalda Zahir graduated from the Unity High School in 1946 and that year Angela became the first Sudanese girl to enter university (University of Khartoum). Khaida entered university in 1947 and graduated as the first Sudanese woman doctor in 1952.

Fatima Talib Isma'il was the first Sudanese woman to get a degree from the University of London and pioneered the Sudanese Woman's movement.

Another Unity High School graduate, Takwi Sirskisian, was the first female Sudanese journalist and published a monthly magazine for women called "Bint Alwady" (The Valley Daughter).

Meena Alexander, an internationally acclaimed poet, scholar, and writer, graduated from the Unity High School in 1964.
