= Seyi Oyesola =

Nigerian doctor

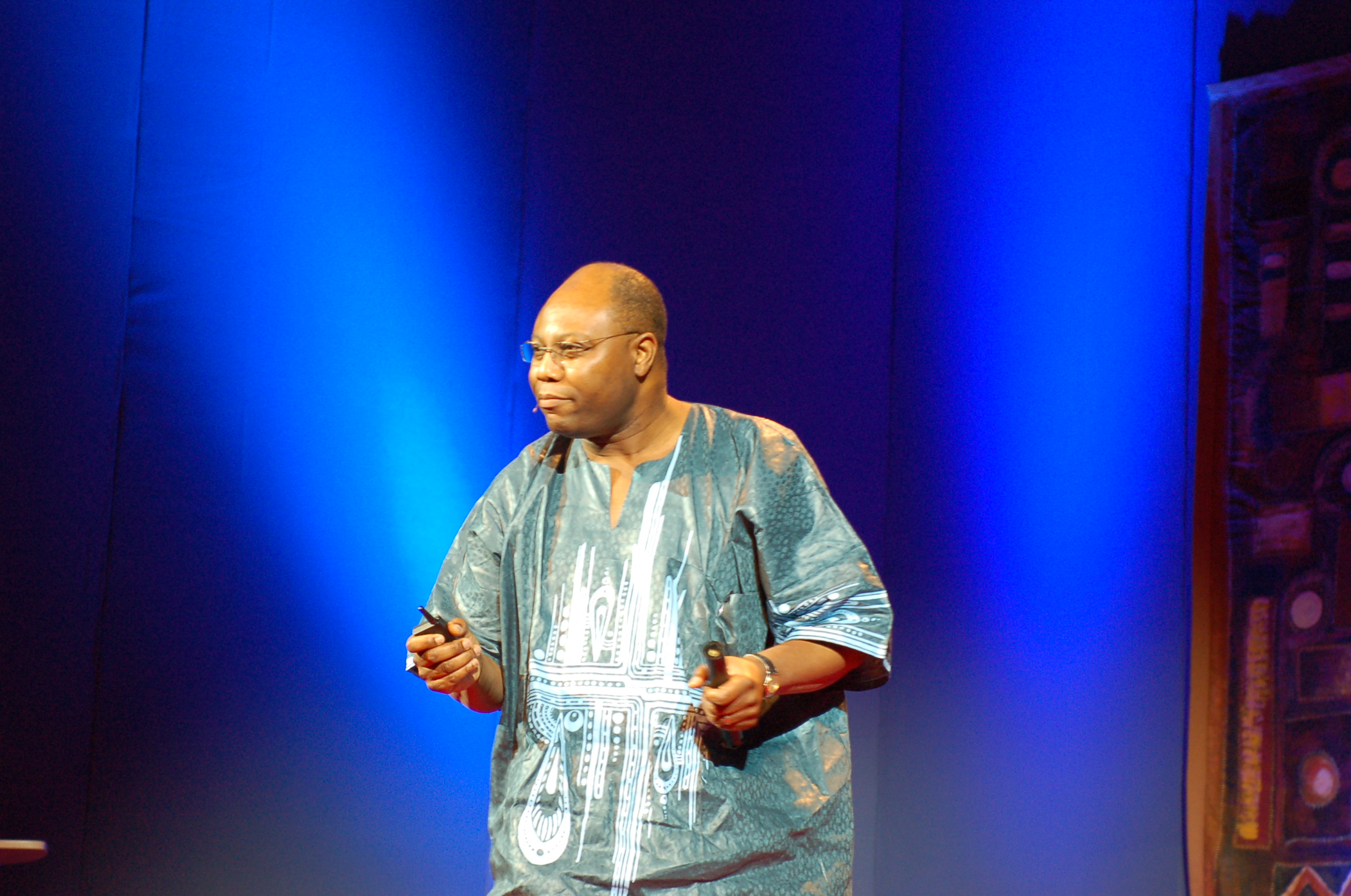
- Seyi Oyesola in 2007
- Born: Babaseyi Oyesola; January 1960 (age 66)
- Citizenship: Nigeria
- Education: University of Lagos
- Occupation: Doctor
- Website: Seyi Oyesola

Seyi Oyesola is a Nigerian doctor, who co-invented "hospital in a box".

Dr. Oyesola co-invented hospital in a box, a mini hospital run with solar energy or off grid and completely mobile.

== Early life and education ==
He was born Babaseyi Oyesola but popularly known as Dr. Seyi Oyesola. Oyesola was born in Nigeria but grew up in Cleveland, Ohio, in the USA. He graduated from high school in 1975 and came down to Nigeria where he obtained his Bachelors of Science Degree from the University of Lagos in 1986. Dr. Seyi practiced in Nigeria for a short time before going to the United Kingdom and the United States for specialized trainings in anesthesiology and critical care.

== Career ==
Dr. Seyi Oyesola came back again to Nigeria, his original home in 2015, to practice. But lo, the state of the community hospitals and health centers disheartened him as people died from simple treatable and manageable illnesses like trauma, burn and heart attacks. This was where the innovation on improving the health sector in the country began. He wanted to save life and gave back to the communities that gave him, his heritage. Dr. Seyi worked in the University of Lagos where he rose to lead a team of young doctors in anesthesiology.

Dr Oyesola was appointed consultant at Medway Maritime Hospital in the UK. In 1998, he joined the University of California, Los Angeles as a visiting assistant professor. In 1999, he became a consultant in anesthesia and critical care in the UK National Health Service (NHS). He also taught at the medical simulation center of the Imperial College School of Medicine in 2001.

Seyi Oyesola is the Chief Medical Director of Delta State University Teaching Hospital (DELSUTH) in Nigeria. Under his leadership, the hospital carried out its first successful kidney transplant in 2014. He has worked for more than 25 years in anesthesiology and critical care, with involvement in the development of medical equipment, clinical training, and capacity-building initiatives for hospitals in Nigeria, including rural healthcare facilities.

One of his contributions to medical practices was the co-creation of “hospital in a box ” called CompactOR (Compact Operating Room) in 2007. This movable set has the capability of bringing surgical care to every part of Africa. This magical set was portable and could be delivered to rural areas and other places with jeep or helicopter. Another amazing characteristics of the “hospital in a box” was that it could be set up in just ten minutes with complete operating room with all the relevant surgical tools including the defibrillators, EKG monitoring, anesthesia and surgical lighting. It was solar paneled and could perform oral surgeries like the removal of wisdom teeth, removal of cataracts, gall bladders and appendices. Reports have it that “hospital in a box” has successfully been used. The estimated cost of the basic hospital in a box was less than £50,000 (around US$77,350) which was about one fifth of the cost made available for the same services.

== Achievements ==
- Co-authorship and publications of 8 articles on medicine
- Co-development of CompactOR (Compact Operating Room), “hospital in a box”
- Establishment of Practice Ventures in 1996. A company that developed and supplied high-tech medical equipment and training to African hospitals
- Successful TED Global talk in 2007 on hospital in a box

== Membership of Professional Associations ==
- Association of Anesthetists of Great Britain and Ireland
- Royal Society of medicine, Intensive Care Society UK
- Royal College of Surgeons (Anaesthesia) Ireland.
