= Abdul Kamara =

United Nations official

Abdul B. Kamara is a Sierra Leonean development economist and diplomat who served as the United Nations Joint Special Representative in Darfur from 2014 to 2015.

== Career ==
Prior to this appointment of 25 September 2014 by United Nations Secretary-General Ban Ki-moon, Dr. Kamara held several high-level positions in the African Development Bank. He served as Resident Representative in the Sudan Country Office from 2011 to 2014, Manager of the Research Division from 2007 to 2010 and Senior Agricultural Economist from 2004 to 2007. Before joining the African Development Bank, Dr. Kamara held the position of Research Scientist at the International Water Management Institute in Ghana and South Africa.

Following his term as the United Nations Joint Special Representative in Darfur, Dr. Kamara returned to he African Development Bank. Dr. Kamara initially returned to the role of Resident Representative in the Sudan Country Office before being appointed as Country Manager for Ethiopia by then-African Development Bank President, Akinwumi Adesina, in 2017. In January 2021, Dr. Kamara was appointed as Deputy Director General for the East Africa Region. Dr. Kamara currently serves as a Director General at the African Development Bank in the Nigeria Country Office.

== Education ==
Dr. Kamara graduated with a Bachelor of Science (Vordiplom) in Agriculture from the University of Hohenheim in 1993. He subsequently completed a Master of Science (cum laude) in Agricultural Economics from the University of Hohenheim in 1997 followed by an award-winning PhD (cum laude) in Agricultural and Development Economics from the University of Göttingen. Dr. Kamara was awarded Germany's prestigious Josef G. Knoll Science Award in 2002 for his PhD dissertation. He was the first Sierra Leonean, and fourth African to receive the award.

== Books ==
- Unknown Destination. Sierra Leonean Writers Series. 2003. ISBN 978-3980808415.
