= Eustace Palmer =

Sierra Leonean author and academic

- Born: Freetown, Sierra Leone
- Education: Prince of Wales School; University of Edinburgh
- Occupations: Professor, literary critic and author

Eustace Palmer is a Sierra Leonean professor, literary critic and author.

== Early life ==
Eustace Palmer was born in Freetown, Sierra Leone, to ethnic Creole parents.

== Education ==
Palmer was educated at primary and secondary schools in Sierra Leone. He attended the Prince of Wales School in Freetown. Palmer pursued his postgraduate education in the United Kingdom, where he obtained an honors degree and Ph.D. in English Language and Literature from the University of Edinburgh, presenting the thesis "The relationship of the morality of Henry Fielding's novels to their art". Palmer taught for several years at Fourah Bay College, the University of Sierra Leone. He was Professor of English, Chair of the English Department, Dean of the Faculty (School) of Arts, Public Orator, and Dean of Graduate Studies at Fourah Bay College.

== Career ==
He has taught at the University of Texas at Austin, at Randolph Macon Woman's College, and as a Professor of English at Fourah Bay College, University of Sierra Leone. Currently, he teaches at Georgia College & State University. Palmer is an author and a literary critic.

He was President of the African Literature Association (ALA) from 2006 to 2007. He is the recipient of the ALA's Distinguished Member award, as well as the Georgia College & State University's Distinguished Professor Award.

== Literary works ==
Palmer has many published books of literary criticism, including Studies in the English Novel, An Introduction to the African Novel, The Growth of the African Novel, Of War and Women Oppression and Optimism: New Essays on the African Novel and Knowledge is More Than Mere Words: A Critical Introduction to Sierra Leonean Literature.

Palmer is also a novelist, the author of A Hanging is Announced, Canfira's Travels, A Tale of Three Women and A Pillar of the Community.
