= Osman Eltayeb =

Sudanese Businessman

Osman Eltayeb (Born 1919 - 29 September 2011) in Rufaa, Sudan was a Sudanese Businessman and the Honorary Consul of Sudan in Nigeria.

He migrated to Nigeria in 1939 with his uncle Bashir Elrayah who was posted there by the Sudanese Judiciary. He later abandoned his studies to pursue a trading career, and as of the 1950s, Osman Eltayeb was a well established figure in the Nigerian markets- Controlling a large share of the cotton and textile markets. He founded the group Osman Eltayeb and Sons and later diversified into Skin and Hides becoming one of the leading exporters in Africa and also setting up Wheat Mills, Nicco Sweets (With brother Ibrahim), Rivera Biscuits and a Cattle bone-crushing company. The group also has large real estate investments in the United Kingdom. An arm of the group also has investments in the Sudanese Gum arabic and Hibiscus markets. Sheikh Bashir Elrayah School was founded in 1996 as a non-profit and high standard of education school by Osman as a way of giving back to the community. The school now has over 2000 students enrolled and is among the best in Northern Nigeria.

Osman Eltayeb was a leading figure in Sudanese and Nigerian politics. He was a very close personal friend of Sudan's late President Ja'far Numeiri and a close ally of President Omar al-Bashir. He played a prominent role in getting the North and South of Sudan to negotiate the Comprehensive Peace Agreement (CPA) 2005 in the Nigerian capital Abuja. This, in turn, led to the end of the 21-year-old Civil War in Sudan.

For his many contributions to the Sudanese and Nigerian communities, Osman Eltayeb received the Nilein Award (Highest degree) from Sudan's President Omar al-Bashir and the Order of the Federal Republic (OFR) award from Nigeria's President Obasanjo.

He became one of the leading philanthropists in both Nigeria and Sudan. Being from a very religious Islamic background, he built and aided in the building of Mosques and Islamic Centers. He also built the Osman Eltayeb Community Hospital in Rufaa, North Sudan.

In the words of Maitama Sule, former Nigerian Ambassador to the UN, "Osman Eltayeb is a Loyal Friend, Osman is a Generous man, Osman is a Gentleman. Osman loves Nigeria just as he loves his own country Sudan. Indeed we know he has been a friend of most of our leaders, Traditional and political. Among them the Emirs (Past and Present) of Kano."

Two separate TV documentaries were filmed and aired about the lifetime achievements of Osman Eltayeb, By Sudan TV and Shirouq TV in 2007 and 2010 respectively.
