= Abir Ibrahim =

Sudanese-American development economist and author

- Born: 33–36; Khartoum, Sudan
- Education: Georgetown University; University of New England; University of Mary Washington
- Occupations: Author, development economist, public historian

Abir Ibrahim (born April 1990–1993) is a Sudanese-American development economist, author and public historian, known for her work on African economic recovery and cultural preservation. Since 2022, she has led the government engagement and region's sustainability agenda for Africa at the World Economic Forum.

In 2019, she was appointed by the Global Solutions Initiative to the G7/G20 policy framework as Young Global Changer and Ambassador for Africa.

Her book ‘’Love Letters to Sudan’’ is celebrated as the first photography book on Sudan, documenting all 18 states of the country. In 2023, she was named among the 100 Most Influential African Women.

== Early life and education ==
Ibrahim was born in Khartoum. Her grandfather, Ibrahim Al Haj Daoud, a historian who established the first national library in Kassala, was the son of a respected Sufi teacher. She studied at Georgetown University and University of Mary Washington, and holds a master’s in health economics and policy from the University of New England.

== Career ==
Between 2017 and 2022, Ibrahim worked across several UNICEF roles. As Regional Representative for UNICEF USA, she mobilized senior government, corporations and high-net worth individuals in the Mid-Atlantic region. In 2019, she moved to Khartoum to establish UNICEF’s private sector portfolio, supporting the development of Sudan’s Public-Private Partnership Law No. 10, which was gazetted on 12 May 2021.

At the World Economic Forum, Ibrahim's policy writing has addressed Africa's food security, energy transition, and economic cooperation. Her analysis of Africa's agricultural potential was cited in the Global Risks Report 2025. Her work on the Africa green transition was published by CNBC Africa.

In March 2026, Ibrahim joined an Oxford panel on investment risk and the cost of capital in Africa alongside representatives from the African Union and the World Bank at the Oxford Africa Business Forum, Saïd Business School. Her speech "Africa Is Not Developing. It Is Recovering," argued that conventional development frameworks mischaracterize African economies.

== Publication ==
Her book Love Letters to Sudan (2024) is celebrated as the first photography book on Sudan as told by Sudanese. It covers every region of the country, including communities and landscapes often absent from international coverage. Ibrahim began documenting in 2010, collecting photographs, archives and oral histories from across the country.

In October 2026, Ibrahim presented the work at the Open Society AALFIE VII literary festival in Brussels alongside novelist Sulaiman Addonia, Abdelaziz Baraka Sakin and author Yassmin Abdel-Magied. She also co-hosted the first photography exhibition on Sudan in Geneva, Switzerland with Islamic Relief to raise awareness about the ongoing crisis.

== Recognition ==
- 100 Most Influential African Women (2023)
- 100 Most Influential Young Africans (2023)
- 100 Most Impactful Voices (2024), ABCD Africa
- 18 African Women Leading Global Corporations (2025), Leading Ladies Africa
- Young Global Changer (2019), Ambassador for Africa (2022), Global Solutions Initiative
