= Mohamed Osman Baloola =

Sudanese scientist and inventor (born 1981)

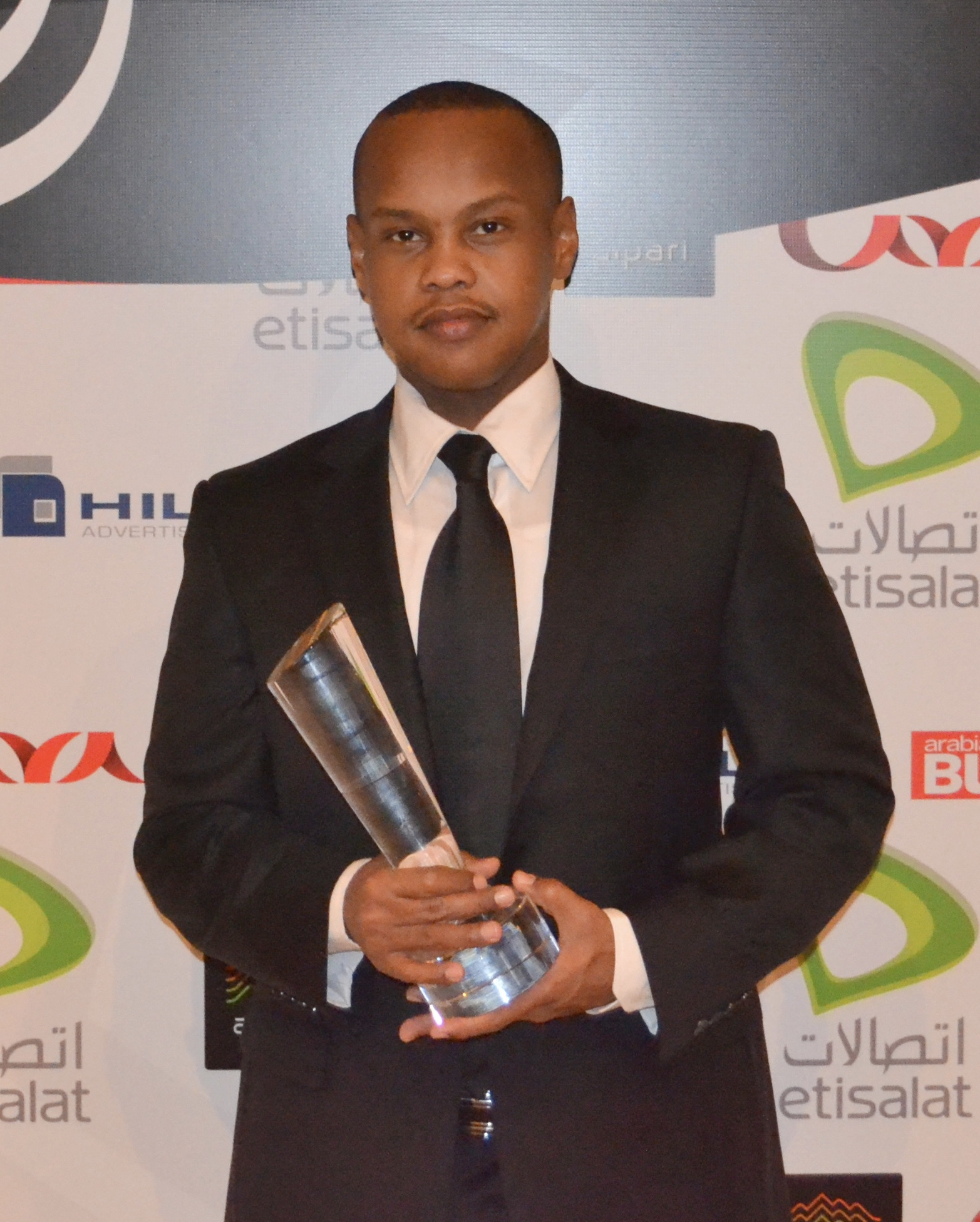
- Baloola in 2012
- Born: April 14, 1981 (age 45); Abu Dhabi, UAE
- Education: Ajman University of Science and Technology
- Known for: Diabetes research
- Scientific career
- Fields: Engineering, biomedical engineering, diabetes
- Workplaces: Ajman University of Science and Technology

Mohamed Osman Baloola (Arabic: (محمد عثمان بلولة) born April 14, 1981) is a Sudanese scientist and inventor who was named among The World's 500 Most influential Arabs in 2012 and 2013 for his work on diabetes. Baloola has been a teaching assistant of biomedical engineering at the Ajman University of Science and Technology since 2010. He won a science and innovation award at the Arabian Business Awards 2011, in the Amrani hotel at Burj Khalifa in Dubai. He won Dh40,000 (11,000 US) during a Sharjah television competition for his invention of a remote monitoring and control system for diabetes patients via mobile phone.

== Early life and education ==
Baloola was born on April 14, 1981, in Abu Dhabi, United Arab Emirates.

Baloola received a Bachelor of Science in biomedical engineering from Ajman University of Science and Technology in September 2009. Then he joined Ajman University as a teaching assistant in the Faculty of Engineering. He won many awards during his studies and after graduating.

== Research and publications ==
- Mobile Phone Based Remote Monitoring and Control system For Individualized Healthcare. First AMA-IEEE Medical Technology on Individualized Healthcare, Washington DC, US.2010
- Connected Healthcare Solution Using Cell phone. ASME's 5th Frontiers in Biomedical Devices Conference & Exhibition, California, US.2010
- Automated Wireless System for Individuals Requiring Continuous Remote Care 6th World Congress on Biomechanics, in conjunction with 14th International Conference on Biomedical Engineering (ICBME), Singapore .2010
- Ankabut Users Meeting January 2012.

== Diabetes ==
Mohamed researches diabetes due to a family history of suffering from the disease. His father, mother and brother are diabetics and his concern for the growing number of diabetics worldwide prompted his invention. He developed a remote monitoring and control system for diabetes symptoms. He set about creating an artificial pancreas and a remote system to monitor the stability of glucose levels in diabetics. The device, which can be linked to a hospital database system as well as family and friends, enables an immediate response if a medical situation arises.

== Prizes and awards ==
- The World's 500 Most influential Arabs in 2013 in the “scientist inventor” category for his outstanding contributions in the areas of innovation, research and community service.
- The World's 500 Most influential Arabs in 2012.
- Arabian Business Achievement Awards 2011 – Science and Innovation Award 2011
- First prize in Tomohat Shabab TV program(Young Innovation Award), Sharjah TV 2011
- First place in the “Voting for the Best Project” category, 4th UAE Software Development Trade Show, Wollongong University, Dubai 2010
- Third place in the “Business Judging” category, 4th UAE Software Development Trade Show, Wollongong University, Dubai 2010
- Best Research Paper in Faculty of Engineering, The Fifth Approach Student Scientific Conference 2009
- Best Project on Biomedical Day 2008.

== Honors ==
- Honor by the Sudanese Ambassador / Ahmed alsadeeq Abdulhai – Sudan Ambassador in UAE – On celebrations of Sudan's 56th Independence Day.2012
- Honor from Sudanese Consulate in Dubai and Sudanese Club On celebrations of Sudan's 56th Independence Day- Sudanese Club in Dubai.2012
- Honor from the higher Council for the Sudanese community in the UAE – On celebrations of Sudan's 56th Independence Day.2012
- Honor from Al-Merrikh sport club On celebrations of Sudan's 56th Independence Day- Sudanese Club in Dubai.2012
- Award by Vice President of Ajman University for Commendable achievement for the year.2011
