= Fadel Saeed =

Sudanese comedian

- الفاضل سعيد
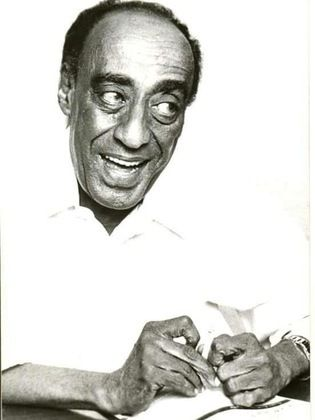
- Born: El-Fadel Said Dirar Silntout; 1935; Ghaddar village, Northern State, Sudan
- Died: 10 June 2005 (aged 69–70)
- Years active: 1955 – 2005
- Website: elcinema.com/person/1056688/

Fadel Saeed (Arabic: الفاضل سعيد; 1935 – 10 June 2005) was a Sudanese comedian.

== Early life ==
El-Fadel Said Dirar Silntout was born in 1935 and grew up in a religious environment in the Ghaddar village near Dongola, the capital of the Northern State. His father is Saeed Salantoud, and his mother is Fatima Muhammad Salentoud. His father did not know the Arabic language and speaks the Nubian language, and his mother did not know the Nubian language, but she is fluent in the Arabic language. In the face of this discrepancy, Al-Fadil Saeed found himself within the framework of a combination that gave him mental and educational wealth.

His grandmother raised him in Omdurman, and he was imbued with the culture of Omdurman and the Bayt al-Mal neighbourhood. The family includes those who came with Muhammad Ahmad al-Mahdi to Omdurman, including those who were martyred in the Battle of Shaykan.

== Acting debut ==
The climates he lived in were free to attract and pull him, as he did not discover the queen of acting except when he had the opportunity when the family moved from the Bayt al-Mal neighbourhood to Wad Nubawi in Omdurman. And his joining the scouts, which is a family activity, was the credit for showing his talent. The scout troupe was sponsored by Abd al-Rahman al-Mahdi. It gave him the opportunity to participate in acting as its youngest member. And the first thing he presented was his transformation of the Scout Law into a drama with the participation of his peers, and they improvised the acting. During the break during the activity, he used to prepare and prepare for the other breaks, which enabled him to practice on the improvisational side. This was his first step towards composing and acting.

In elementary school, he found a follower of Professor Khaled Abu Al-Rous, who taught him arithmetic, and watched him with the Sudan Acting Troupe. Al-Fadil wished to become like him. But he stood in his way while he was presenting with the students at the school the Malayat Theatre, where he said to him: O my son, I do not want you to act now.. If you act now, you will not learn, and we need an educated actor.

After joining the Egyptian Secondary School (Educational Mission Schools), the teachers used to transfer the plays of Naguib Al-Rayhani, which deepened his sense of the importance of the theatre and he decided to be theatrical.

After completing high school, he joined the University of Khartoum to study literature, but his passion for theatre made him submit his papers to join the Higher Institute of Music in Cairo, but his teachers advised him not to waste four years without interest, because the field in which he could work does not exist in Sudan. He relied on God, chose the path of theatre, and tested himself among an audience from outside the framework of the students, as the Khartoum audience came for the first time to watch the huge celebrations that Egyptian schools hold at the end of the year. These include music, sports and acting. And he began to act for an audience that could see and speak, which gave him the confidence to act.

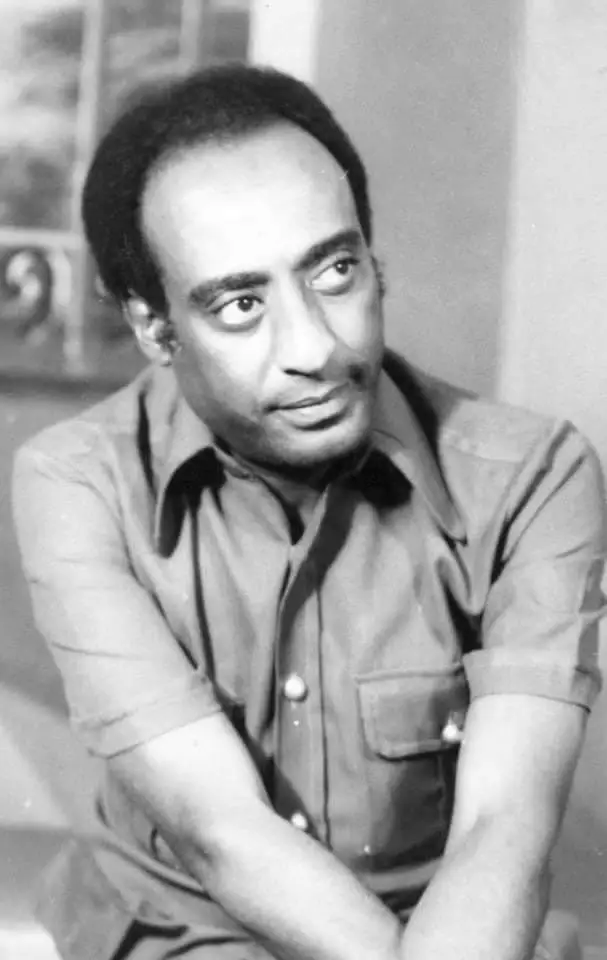

In 1955, he started forming a youth troupe for comedy acting. This group included Mahmoud Siraj "Abu Qaboura", who came at a later stage, Othman Ahmed Hamad "Abu Dalibah" and the late Othman Iskandarani, in addition to a group of girls. The band was registered in Omdurman Municipal Council. It was based in the Workers Club. Perhaps he owes credit to this club, Mother Dramani, which embraced the troupe with which he came out from the audience of watching and the framework of the scouts and school activities to a troupe that presents its theatrical performances.

After that, the virtuous Saeed felt that the high school stage had ended, and he did not have other educational opportunities, or a person who could benefit from it, as he was the first person to start comedy in its Aristotelian form, or in its modern form, so he began to think to find sources, especially since this destiny has become a destiny and a livelihood. He found the urgent need for reading, which he started by reading, reading world theatre and poetry. The experience rooted in the spread that prompted him to move his theatre to the regions that he used to move to with these small groups, feeling that the audience of the capital is the audience of the regions, which if you address it in a dialect language, you can reach a basic goal, which is entering the Sudanese radio, which was very difficult. He did not enter it by acting in comedy that was unknown, undesirable, or wanted, so he took another path by presenting small and serious skits through the Women's Corner, Children's Corner, and Farmer's Corner programs, and this allowed the artistic name to spread through more than one program. The Barameel Theatre, which became the Radio Theatre, and turned into the National Theatre, to be recognized and joined by the Radio.

== His works ==
One of the most famous works that Al-Fadil Saeed presented to the Sudanese theater is the play "Eat Aish", which was in 1967, and it is the stage of transition to plays with chapters. With the beginning of the spread and the spread of the name at the country level, he traveled on Arab tours, the most prominent of which was his visit to Cairo to present the play (Eat Bish) as the first non-Egyptian Arab play to be filmed and broadcast on Egyptian television. After 15 years, it was recorded by Sudanese TV and other plays such as "Al-Kaskat" and Eyes Journey[Ar] 1983.

After that, theatrical works followed, such as (the play Alfi Raso Rish) and (the play of people in what they do) and many television works such as the series (Ramadaniyat) and the series (Death of the Dhan), in addition to the characters entrenched in the public's mind, "Al-Ajab Amo" and "Bit Qadim" and " Kratop..

Al-Fadil Saeed also enjoyed the talent for poetry, and he has a collection of poetry in the name of Agharidy, and The Theater of Words has not yet been published. He collaborated with the late artist Muhammad Ahmed Awad in the songs "My Father, Why Don't You Say No", "Al-Boustajy" and "I Hit a Phone". The story of the song "My Father Don't Say Why No" goes back to the travel of Al-Fadil Saeed on an artistic trip by train to the city of Port Sudan with the artists Ibrahim Awad, Salah Muhammad Issa and Muhammad Ahmed Awad, and he accompanied them to present comic links during the singing breaks, and during the trip, Al-Fadil Saeed sang a poem, Raja, and he was suffering at the time From an emotional and psychological crisis after he proposed to his wife, Hosni Al-Muddathir, and was rejected by her family because he is an actor before they agreed after that, and after performing the song, she found admiration from everyone, especially from the artist Mohamed Ahmed Awad, who sang it after that, and it became one of the most famous songs.

=== His characters ===
The virtuous Saeed, as mentioned above, was famous for a number of personalities who formed an overwhelming presence on the Sudanese stage, the most famous of which is the character (Bit Qadeem), the great grain with a sharp tongue, who intelligently criticizes many social aspects and phenomena, in addition to the character (Al-Ajb) and the character (Hajj Kartoub), which are all vivid caricature models Sarcastic criticism.

- He made his way with painstaking patience and perseverance until he became an unsurpassable figure in the history of the Sudanese theatre, and he was one of the first to go out with the theatre from the capital and the Safavid groups able to go to the theatre to the different regions until he attracted this audience to him, who became inviting him and waiting for him and interacting with him with love, spontaneity and increasing appreciation.
- It is true that he was influenced by the Egyptian theater, especially during his studies in the Egyptian mission schools, where he met the famous comedian Amin Al-Hunaidi, and the well-known comedian Mohamed Ahmed Al-Masry, famous for (Abu Lam'a Al-Asli), who influenced him to push his talent in acting, but he was able to get out of their cloak while presenting these Sudanese patterns. Although some of his physical movements still bear this effect, this does not diminish the specificity and distinction of his talent.

He was one of the first founders of the youth troupe for comedy representation, and he dreamed until the end of his days of the theatre of Al-Fadil Saeed, and throughout this artistic stage he was closely related to his audience in the regions, who wanted the will of the Lord to conclude his artistic life in a city dear to him, which is the beloved Red Mermaid, Port Sudan.

He started his artistic career when he was eighteen, and he was the star in hundreds of comedy plays that he performed in theatres in Khartoum and other Sudanese cities. Al-Fadil Saeed died on Friday 10 June 2005 in the city of Port Sudan on the Red Sea, where he was presenting his latest plays. The Sudanese president, the ministers of culture and information, the officials of the national theatre, and the radio and television stations expressed their sorrow for the loss of the artist, who constituted a milestone in Sudanese art. An honorary doctorate was conferred on the honourable late actor, a short time before his departure, the honourable Saeed, a name that no one familiar with the march of the Sudanese theatre could overlook. We can say that it is the only theatrical current in Sudan, as it remained conservative and preserved its theatrical style, which remained open to all the social and political transformations that have passed through Sudan over the past fifty years, during which this man planted the banner of the art of theatre and pledged care and attention to it. It was as a result of this that he presented many Sudanese theatrical works, enriching the arena with them and participating in them in creating a dramatic conscience for the Sudanese person.. which qualifies this great artist to be said to be the owner of a distinguished theatrical current. Not only did the virtuous Saeed tour all the cities, villages and villages of Sudan, but he pursued the Arab man by touring some Arab countries and presenting his fine art on their theatres.

Fifty years is the journey of giving that the pioneer playwright, Al-Fadil Saeed, embarked on in the Sudanese theatre. And his belief in his message, which he did not skimp on with effort and thought, is calculated for him. The only increase in the journey was long patience and creative exhaustion that made him move from success to success.

== Legacy ==
In October 2018, experts at the Khartoum International Book Fair symposium praised Al-Fadil Saeed role as a pioneer in Sudanese theater, emphasizing his authentic portrayal of Sudanese life. Dr Saad Youssef highlighted Al-Fadil's unique theatre, his advocacy for women, and his contribution to radio, TV, and cinema. Actor Sayed Abdullah Sousal recognized Al-Fadil as a global phenomenon at risk of being forgotten due to poor documentation. Heba Mohamed Salih stressed Al-Fadil's distinctive improvisational style, considering it a valuable heritage for future generations.

== Personal life ==
Al-Fadil Saeed died on Friday, June 10, 2005 in the city of Port Sudan, where he was presenting his last play, "Al-Haskannit," of which he gave (13) performances, and in those performances he was repeating a phrase that was not present in the text, which is, "Pardon me." From me to God and the Messenger," and the crowd behind him was repeating, "To God and the Messenger." His eldest son, Magdy Al-Fadel Saeed, says that his father lived and dedicated his life to art, and he always made them feel that he was their friend before he was a father. Magdy added that the first Al-Fadel Saeed Festival, whose activities are taking place these days, will continue annually to preserve the great artistic legacy of his father, the late artist.
