= Ali M. El-Agraa =

Sudanese academic (born 1941)

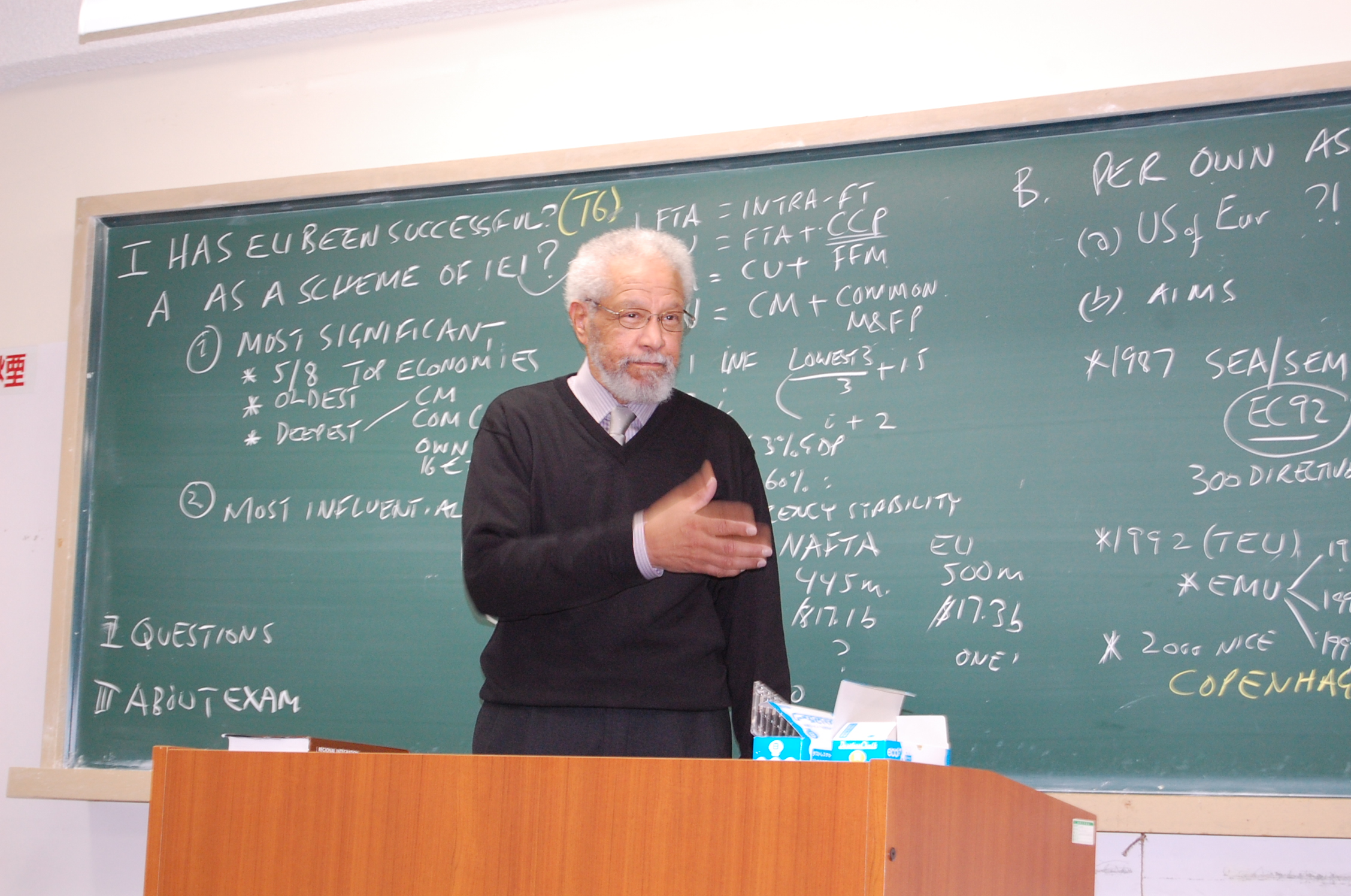
- Born: 1 January 1941 (age 85); Wad Medani, Sudan
- Spouse: Diana Latham

Ali M. El-Agraa (Arabic: علي الأقرع, born 1 January 1941) is Emeritus Professor of International Economic Integration, Fukuoka University, Japan. He was invited to Fukuoka University in 1988 while he was a Visiting Professor with the International University of Japan (1984-6), on leave from the University of Leeds (UK), which he joined in 1971. He left Sudan in 1964 for England where he became a permanent resident and in 1977 was granted British citizenship. He is married to Diana Latham Moult (20 October 1979) and has a son (Mark Stephen) and a daughter (Frances Hanna). He is now back in the UK, living in Greater London.

== Education ==
Ali received his earlier education in the Sudan. In 1959, he obtained Division One in the Sudan School Certificate (awarded by the University of Cambridge, UK, in collaboration with the Sudan Examinations Council). In 1961, he took the Intermediate Examinations (roughly equivalent to British A-Levels) in the University of Khartoum with Honours in all three subjects (Economics/Mathematics, Geography and Social Anthropology). In 1964, he was awarded a BSc (Econ) Honours, by the University of Khartoum, externally examined by UK universities, including Cambridge, Oxford and The London School of Economics and Political Science.

For his postgraduate studies, he went to the University of Leeds (UK), where, in 1967, he obtained an M.A. in Economics with Distinction. After becoming a lecturer in economics at the University of Khartoum in 1967, he returned to the University of Leeds in 1968 to research for his doctorate under the supervision of the late Professor Arthur Joseph Brown, but before finishing his doctorate, the University of Leeds appointed him Lecturer in Economics in 1971. In 2000, he was awarded a PhD (Doctor of Philosophy) by the University of Leeds for a thesis titled Theoretical and Policy Aspects of Protection and International Economic Cooperation. In 2001, he was awarded a higher doctorate (DSc) by Japan's Kyushu University for his book Regional Integration: Experience, Theory and Measurement, and for his overall academic record.

== Academic field ==
Ali's main academic field is International Economics, with several books (some translated into Japanese and Chinese) on various aspects of the field. Most of his research is on International Economic Integration, with the 9th edition of his 1980 book, The Economics of the European Community, published as a students' text in October 2011 by Cambridge University Press with the title The European Union: Economics and Policies.

== Academic career ==
Ali began his academic career in 1964 when he was appointed by the University of Khartoum as a Senior Scholar (their official term for Assistant Lecturer) in Economics, in the Faculty of Economic and Social Studies. He was promoted to Lecturer in Economics in 1967. In 1971, he became Lecturer in Economics with the University of Leeds, School of Economic Studies, which became Leeds University Business School, LUBS. He was promoted in 1981 to Senior Lecturer there, a position he retained until 1993. But before then, he joined Fukuoka University in Japan as the Professor of International Economics and European/American Economies in the Faculty of Commerce, a position he held until retirement on 31 March 2011 as Emeritus Professor of International Economic Integration, in recognition of his contributions to his academic field.

Ali has held several visiting academic positions: Visiting Professor' of the Economics of the European Community at the University of York (UK) during 1980–81; Visiting Professor (of International Economics, Middle Eastern Studies and West European Integration with the Graduate School of International Relations, International University of Japan, during 1984–86; Visiting Professor of the Economics of the European Community, Fudan University, Shanghai in February–March 1985; and Visiting Professor of Economics with Vanderbilt University (Nashville Tennessee, USA) during 1997–98. He was also Adjunct Professor of EU Studies (with, inter alia) Kyushu National University, Seinan Gakuin University and Kyushu Sangyo University all in Fukuoka, Japan, for various periods during 1989–2000. He has taught several intensive graduate courses at the Japan International Development Institute, sponsored by the World Bank in Tokyo, Japan in 1986, and Chulalongkorn University, in Bangkok, Thailand, in 2010.

== Accolades, consultancies and affiliations ==
Ali was an elected member of The Council of the University of Leeds, during 1980-84 and an invited member of The Senate of the University of Leeds, during 1979–82, when he was the Head of The Office of the University of Leeds Adviser to Overseas Students, now The International Student Office. He was also an elected Member of Council, the University of Leeds, during 1987-90 and an elected Member of Senate, the University of Leeds, during 1983–86.

He was External Examiner for Reading University (UK) for the Department of Economics and its Graduate School of European and International Studies for the M.A. and MSc degrees in, respectively, Economics and European Integration; he declined invitations to act as such for many UK universities due to his absence in Japan. He was also a member of the Committee of the UK's Economic and Social Research Council (ESRC), sponsored by the International Economics Study Group (IESG) during 1972–88.

He has acted as General Consultant for The Anglo-Japanese Economic Institute (London, 1996–2002) and Senior International Consultant for The United Nations (2001). He has also been endowed with a Life-time Visiting Professorship by Wuhan University (People's Republic of China),1990–; and, was (jointly with Anthony J Jones) awarded The Daeyang Prize for the best article published in 2008 in the Journal of Economic Integration. He is the author of several books in Economics.

== Major works ==
=== Books written ===
- 1980, The Economics of the European Community Philip Allan, Oxford (UK) and St. Martin's Press, New York
  - 2011, 9th ed., with invited edited contributions, Cambridge University Press (Cambridge and New York), as The European Union: Economics and Policies
  - Chinese translation (by Professors Dai Bingran, assisted by Wu Yi Kang, Zhou Jian Ping and Jiang San Ming, of Fudan University, Shanghai, and the Chinese Association for Western European Studies) published in November 1985 (Shanghai Translation Publishing House: Shanghai, PRC).
- 1981,(co-author with Anthony J. Jones) The Theory of Customs Unions, Philip Allan, Oxford (UK) and St. Martin's Press, New York
- 1983, The Theory of International Trade, Croom Helm of Beckenham (UK) and St. Martin's Press (New York)
  - 1985, Translated into Japanese by Professor Takaaki Ohnishi of Hitotsubashi University (Tokyo, Japan).
- 1984, Trade Theory and Policy: Some Topical Issues, Macmillan, Basingstoke (UK) and Crane Russak, New York
  - 1992, Translated into Japanese in 1992 by Professors Takashi Okayama, Nobuto Iwata and Noriyuki Miyagawa of Waseda University, Tokyo.
- 1988 Japan’s Trade Frictions: Realities or Misconceptions? Macmillan (Basingstoke, UK) and St. Martin's Press (New York)
- 1989 International Trade, Macmillan (Basingstoke, UK) and St. Martin's Press (New York)
- 1989 The Theory and Measurement of International Economic Integration, Macmillan (Basingstoke, UK) and St. Martin's Press (New York)
- 1999 Regional Integration: Experience, Theory and Measurement, Macmillan (Basingstoke, UK) and St. Martin's Press (New York)
- 2015 The European Union Illuminated: Its Nature, Importance and Future, Macmillan (Basingstoke, UK) and St. Martin's Press (New York)

=== Books edited ===
- 1982 International Economic Integration (Macmillan: London; St. Martin's Press: New York)
  - 2nd edition in 1988, 3rd in 1997, under a new title, Economic Integration Worldwide
- 1983 Britain within the European Community: the Way Forward (Macmillan: London; Crane Russak: New York)
- 1987 Protection, Cooperation, Integration and Development: Essays in Honour of Professor Hiroshi Kitamura, Macmillan (Basingstoke, UK) and St. Martin's Press (New York)
- 1993 Public and International Economics: Essays in Honour of Professor Hirofumii Shibata, Macmillan (Basingstoke, UK) and St. Martin's Press (New York)
- 2002 The euro and Britain: the Implications of Moving into the EMU (Pearson Education, Prentice Hall and Financial Times: Hemel Hempstead)
