= Melaku Worede =

Ethiopian agronomist (1936–2023)

- መላኩ ወረደ
- Born: 1936; Shewa, Ethiopia
- Died: 31 July 2023 (aged 86–87)
- Education: PhD in Agronomy, University of Nebraska–Lincoln
- Organization(s): Seeds of Survival Programme of Ethiopia UN Food and Agriculture Organization's Commission on Plant Genetic Resources
- Known for: Agronomy
- Awards: Right Livelihood Award, 1989 Outstanding International Contribution Award, 2008, National Green Award Foundation

Melaku Worede (Amharic: መላኩ ወረደ; 1936 – 31 July 2023) was an Ethiopian geneticist and agronomist.

Melaku was born in 1936, in Shewa, Ethiopia, to Qeñazmach Worede Gebrekidan, an Ethiopian Shewan governor, army commander and aristocrat from Bulga, and Woizero Amsale Wodajeneh, an Ethiopian noblewoman from Shewa and the daughter of Fitawrari Wodajeneh Awgechaw, who was an army commander and viceroy of Ras Lul Seged in Ethiopia's former Solomonic dynasty Kingdom.

== Education and career ==
Melaku travelled to the US in the 1960s to pursue post-graduate studies. He obtained a PhD in Agronomy with a focus on plant genetics and breeding from the University of Nebraska–Lincoln.

Melaku was awarded the Right Livelihood Award in 1989 "for preserving Ethiopia's genetic wealth by building one of the finest seed conservation centres in the world."

Melaku features in the film Seeds of Justice which was released in June 2012, and features narration from Oscar-winning actor Jeremy Irons. The film was produced by The Gaia Foundation and the African Biodiversity Network, both organisations with whom Melaku has been a long-term ally and worked alongside to lead a number of trainings with Field Officers working across Africa. Melaku has three children: Mary Worede, H/Mariam Melaku Worede and Lij Tedla Melaku Worede.

== Death ==
On 31 July 2023, the Ethiopian Biodiversity Institute (EBI) announced that Melaku had died.
