= Rahiem Shadad =

Sudanese art curator, born 1995

- Born: Arabic: عبد الرحيم إبراهيم; 1995 (age 30–31); Khartoum, Sudan
- Education: Universiti Teknologi Petronas, Malaysia
- Occupations: art curator, gallery manager, writer
- Known for: Curating contemporary art from Sudan
- Movement: contemporary visual art from Sudan
- Website: Rahiem Shaddad at Instagram

Rahiem Shadad (Arabic: رحيم شداد; born Abdelrahiem Ibrahim) is a Sudanese art curator, manager of art galleries and writer. He has become known through his role in promoting contemporary visual arts of Sudan and supporting artists affected by conflict and displacement.

Until the start of the war in Sudan in April 2023, Shadad was the manager of Downtown Gallery in Khartoum. Having found refuge in Nairobi, he has continued to actively support Sudanese artists in various African and European countries. His work explores how visual art registers social, political, emotional, and generational change.

== Life and career ==
Shadad was born in the Sudanese capital Khartoum in 1995. He studied Mechanical Engineering at the Universiti Teknologi Petronas in Malaysia, at the same time maintaining a strong connection with the arts. Beginning his involvement in the art scene around 2015, Shaddad co-founded Downtown Gallery in Khartoum in 2019. He managed to establish the gallery as a well-known venue, organising exhibitions, talks, supporting both emerging and established Sudanese artists. Referring to the 2018/2019 Sudanese revolution that brought the three-decade dictatorship of former President Omar al-Bashir to an end, Shadad said in an interview that he wanted to display the art of this revolution. According to him, this end of dictatorship also allowed a considerable number of Sudanese artists to freely develop their art for the first time.

During this time, he co-curated exhibitions at the local French Cultural Institute and in 2021 was awarded the Qatari-based Arak Collection Curatorial Residency Fellowship. When the civil war erupted in Sudan in April 2023, Downtown Gallery was forced to cease operations and Shadad was displaced. His gallery was destroyed and a vast amount of artwork, including about 165 framed paintings and 300 other pieces belonging to 60 artists, was lost. Shortly before this, Shadad had sent several artworks by painters from Sudan to Europe. At the end of 2023 and in March 2024, these paintings were presented at the exhibition “Disturbance in the Nile: Modern and Contemporary Art from Sudan” in Lisbon and Madrid. The artists featured in this exhibition were Rashid Diab, Eltayeb Dawelbait, Bakri Moaz, Mohammed A. Otaybi, Tariq Nasre, Sannad Shreef, Yasmeen Abdullah, Hassan Kamil, Miska Mohmmed, Reem Al Jeally and Waleed Mohammed.

Since 2023, Shadad has been based in Nairobi, where he initiated support efforts for displaced Sudanese artists both in the Kenyan capital, in Cairo and other countries. From October 2023 to December 2024, he managed "The Rest Residency" in Nairobi, organising multiple exhibitions, seminars, and advocacy programs centered on art, identity, and strengthening the Sudanese diaspora. According to an interview, around 35 Sudanese artists live as refugees in Nairobi, including Bakri Moaz, Yasir Algari and Hani Khalil Jawdat. On 19 September 2025, Shadad participated in the launch of the book Sudan Retold Edition 1½ and an accompanying exhibition of works by Sudanese artists at Alhosh Gallery in Doha, Qatar. This event was presented by Georgetown University in Qatar’s "Seeing Sudan: Politics Through Art Hiwaraat Conference".

In a 2023 interview with Medium magazine, Shadad explained his role as curator for visual arts from Sudan:

Curators are entrepreneurs, creative thinkers and marketers by heart, yet in upmost advanced and sophisticated manner . Historically, art shows in Sudan used to be set and organized entirely by artists themselves, until curators stepped in as marketing intermediaries, connecting narrative and professionally raised layout standards, moving one step closer to final art collectors, shortening the gap between artists and their audience.

=== Selected exhibitions and projects ===
- "Sponsor a Sudanese Artist" a crowdfunding initiative to support artists impacted by the conflict, 2023
- "The gold of the grandmothers", an exhibition of Sudanese visual arts in Cologne, Germany, 2023
- "Disturbance in the Nile", a travelling exhibition (Lisbon, Madrid), featuring works by several Sudanese artists, 2023/2024
- "The Rest Residency" in Nairobi: a program for artists displaced by the war to create, connect, and present work, 2023-2024
- "Sudan Retold Edition 1½", book launch and exhibition at Georgetown University in Qatar and Alhosh Gallery in Doha, 2025
- "Textile Portraiture", an exhibition of photographic works by Sudanese artist Ammar Abdallah Osman a.k.a. Mory, Afrika House Nairobi

== Awards and distinctions ==
- ARAK Collection Annual Curatorial Residency Fellowship Program, 2021
- SEED Award, Prince Claus Award, The Netherlands, 2025

== Selected publications ==
- "In Remembrance: The Life and Art of Tagelsir Ahmed, Sudanese Visionary". Medium. June 2024.
- "Us vs them – in the bad way. Who gets to be Sudanese?" (PDF). The Continent. The War about everything in Sudan (209): 21–22. 16 August 2025.
- "Family ties: Sudan through the eyes of a photographer and textile merchant", Financial Times, 7 June 2025

In December 2023, Shadad published an illustrated essay titled "Between Wakefulness and Dreams in Sudan" about Sudanese photographer Hassan Kamil in the UK-based bi-annual fashion magazine Boy.Brother.Friend. Illustrated with the artist's photographs from the northern town of Berber, Shadad interpreted the images in the context of the country's economic and social disparities, displacement by war and the decades of Islamist rule under Omar al-Bashir.

For the August 2025 issue of the pan-African journal The Continent, Shadad wrote a story about Khalid Shatta, a Sudanese visual artist who fled to Norway. He described how Shatta grew up between Sudan’s ethnic divides, facing poverty and exclusion after his father’s death. Supported by a charity, Shatta studied at the Khartoum College of Fine and Applied Art, but left in 2011 when accused of rebel ties. Fleeing persecution, he eventually gained asylum in Norway in 2011. There, he developed a style blending Sudanese and Norwegian influences. As Shadad reported, Shatta's work explores identity, resilience, and ways to connect divided communities. It was featured in an art exhibition in Nairobi along with works by fellow Sudanese artist Heraa Hassan.

== Reception ==
Shadad's work has been featured by Sudanese and international newsmedia including Andariya online magazine, the BBC, The New York Times, Reuters, Christian Science Monitor, Voice of America, Radio France Internationale, Art Africa magazine and Deutsche Welle, among others. He has been recognised by regional institutions and art platforms for his curatorial residency work and for helping bring international visibility to Sudanese contemporary art.

In June 2023, Shadad along with Sudanese artists Reem Aljeally and Mohamed Sonata was invited to speak at a roundtable discussion about contemporary arts and war in Sudan, organized by the Peace Research Institute Oslo (PRIO). On 18 September 2024, the French Center for Economic, Legal and Social Studies (CEDEJ Khartoum) presented a discussion with Shadad about "The Role of Art and Artists in Times of War and Conflict".

In an interview with Radio France Internationale on the occasion of the 2021 exhibition of Sudanese visual arts in Nairobi, Shadad commented on his vision of artworks as contemporary archives reflecting the changes brought about by war and displacement:

For me, an archive can be our favourite T-shirt, our family photos, or our collective places of convergence, such as a bus station. But the war began in a very personal way, in our homes. Our house was vandalised and looted a week after the conflict began, for example. Working with artists in this context is very important; they show us that these archives are not completely lost, that they live on within us. And this is happening at a time when new generations are arriving, encountering Sudanese people with new accents and perhaps a different culture due to all the population displacement.

— Rahiem Shadad, Sudanese art curator

== See also ==
- Visual arts of Sudan
- Photography in Sudan
- Cinema of Sudan
- Architecture of Sudan
