= A propósito de Sudán =

A propósito de Sudán (Journey of Hope)
- Directed by: Lidia Peralta, Salah Elmur
- Screenplay by: Lidia Peralta, Salah Elmur
- Produced by: Producciones Damira
- Cinematography: Lidia Peralta, Salah Elmur
- Edited by: Wafir Sheikh-Eldin, Mosab Amore, Nasser Mohamed, Lidia Peralta
- Music by: Wafir Sheikh-Eldin, Al-haqiba Music
- Release date: 2009
- Running time: 25 minutes
- Countries: Spain; Sudan

A propósito de Sudán (English title: Journey of Hope) is a 2009 documentary film, directed by Lidia Peralta and Salah El Mur.

== Synopsis ==
By means of five 5-minute films, About Sudan submerges us in some of the most deeply rooted activities in daily life. Based primordially on sound and images, the spectators become acquainted with the Sudanese coffee ceremony, see what happens around a 70 m deep well, meet the river Nile, Sufism and travel in a peculiar public transport: the rickshaw. - Stroke brushes filled with curious facts about a surprising country.

== See also ==
- Cinema of Sudan
