= Osman Waqialla =

Sudanese painter and graphic artist

- عثمان وقيع الله
- Born: Uthman Waqi'-Allah; 1925; Rufa'a, Sudan
- Died: 4 January 2007 (aged 81–82); Rufa'a, Sudan
- Education: School of Design, Gordon Memorial College, Khartoum, Sudan (1945); Camberwell School of Arts and Crafts, London (1946-49); Cairo School of Arabic Calligraphy (1951)
- Known for: Artist and calligrapher
- Movement: Hurufiyya movement

Osman Waqialla (Arabic: عثمان وقيع الله, 1925−4 January 2007), was a 20th century Sudanese painter and calligrapher, noted for his creative use of Arabic letter forms in his artworks, thereby integrating African and Islamic cultural traditions into the contemporary art of Sudan. This use of Arabic calligraphy as a modern, non-religious graphic form places Waquialla within the Arabic art movement that became known as the Hurufiyya movement.

== Life and career ==
Waqialla was born in Rufa'a, in Central Sudan, Al Jazirah state on the banks of the Blue Nile. He graduated from the School of Design, Gordon Memorial College, Khartoum, Sudan in 1945. In 1946, he received a scholarship and moved to England to join Camberwell School of Arts and Crafts in London and finished his studied in 1949. Later he moved to Cairo, Egypt, where he trained as a calligrapher under the master Sayyid Muhammed Ibrahim (died 1994) at the Cairo School of Arabic Calligraphy.

During his time at Camberwell School of Art and Crafts, London, and the School of Arabic Calligraphy, Cairo, Waqialla explored the expressive and compositional possibilities of Arab calligraphic form in his paintings. He thus became one of the first artists to free Arab calligraphy from its historical relationship with the sacred Islamic texts and to propose it as a veritable resource for Modernist art. At the time, this was a revolutionary idea.

After completing his studies, he moved back to Sudan at the beginning of the 1950s, where he taught at the College of Fine and Applied Art. In the early 1960s, some of Waqialla’s students at this college, such as Ahmed Mohammed Shibrain (b. 1931), Ibrahim el-Salahi (b. 1930) and Tag el-Sir Ahmed (b. 1933) joined in the task of creating a new Sudanese modernist art movement, the Khartoum School. From 1954 to 1964, he also worked in his Studio Osman for graphic design, that was known as a meeting place for artists and intellectuals in Khartoum. Apart from his paintings, he wrote poetry and articles about culture. In 1956, he designed the first banknotes of the newly independent state. In 1967, he moved back to London and worked as a consultant calligrapher for the firm of banknote makers De La Rue. - Two years after his final return to Sudan in 2005, he died on 4 January 2007, aged 81.

== Work and context in 20th century art from Sudan ==
Waqialla was part of a group of Sudanese artists, later to be known as the Khartoum School, who wanted to avoid Western art concepts and were searching for a new artistic identity, drawn from their own culture and heritage. By this, he was one of the first artists of the 20th century to explore modern forms of Arabic calligraphy, integrating African cultural and Islamic visual traditions into contemporary Sudanese compositions. He used Arabic letter forms and filled the space between them with splashes of colour. This use of calligraphy within a non-religious artwork places Waquialla within the Hurufiyah Art Movement (also known as the Al-hurufiyyah movement or the North African Letterist movement).

Waqialla's works have been exhibited in Africa, the Middle East, the United States and Europe, including the touring exhibition Seven Stories about Modern Art in Africa, which began at the Whitechapel Art Gallery, London, 1995. The same year, he also participated in a group exhibition at the Barbican Centre's The Curve Gallery, called Signs, Traces and Calligraphy, curated by Rose Issa.

His work can be found in collections of the National Museum of African Art in Washington, D.C., the British Museum, London and in many private collections. The bulk of his work remains in Sudan.

He should be credited for liberating Arabic calligraphy from its traditional boundaries of the sacred text, and for his daring explorations of calligraphic expressions in non-traditional secular Arabic texts in both poetry and prose.

— Salah M. Hassan, Professor of African and African Diaspora Art History and Visual Culture, Cornell University

=== List of selected artworks ===
- Kaf ha ya ayn sadd, 1980 British Museum
- Kufic calligraphy, 1991
- Calligraphy Coming to Life, date unknown
- Portrait of a Man, date unknown

=== Selected exhibitions ===
- 1952: Osman Waiquialla, Cultural Centre, Khartoum (solo exhibition)
- 1969: Osman Waiquialla, Camden Art Centre, England (solo exhibition)
- 1995: Seven Stories Exhibition, Whitechapel Art Gallery, London (exhibition of modern African art)
- 1995: Signs, Traces and Calligraphy Show, Barbican Art Centre, The Curve Gallery, London
- 1996: Seven Stories Exhibition, Guggenheim Museum, New York
- 1999: Writing Arabic, British Museum's touring exhibition
- 2006: Word into Art, British Museum

== See also ==
- Visual arts of Sudan
- Islamic art
- Arabic calligraphy
