= Salah Elmur =

Sudanese visual artist

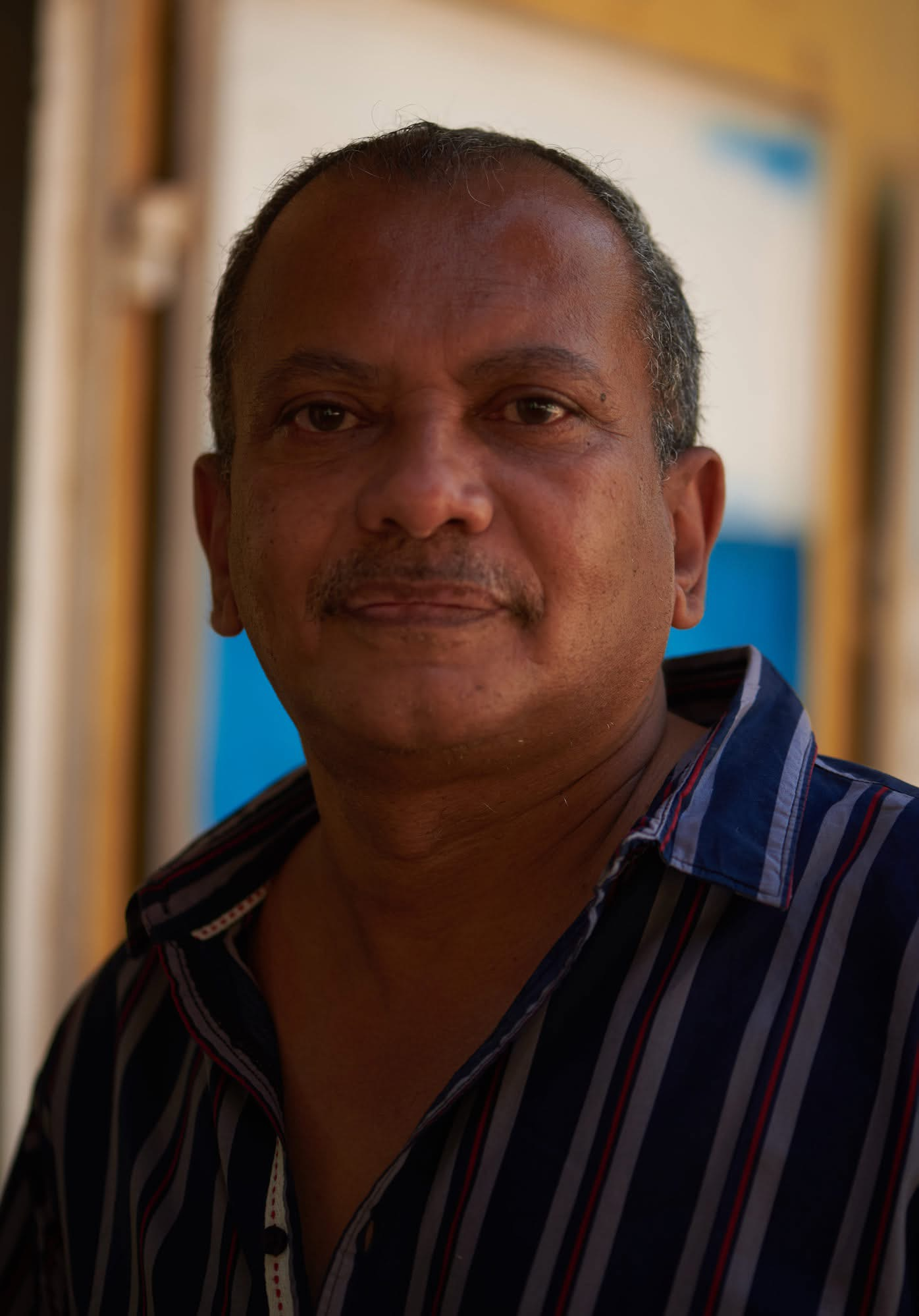
- Born: صلاح المر; 1966 (age 59–60); Al Jarif, Sudan
- Education: College of Fine and Applied Art
- Alma mater: Sudan University of Science and Technology
- Movement: modern Sudanese art
- Website: elmur.weebly.com/index.html

Salah Elmur also spelled Salah El Mur (Arabic: صلاح المر, born 1966, Al Jarif, Sudan) is a contemporary Sudanese painter, graphic designer, author, and filmmaker, who lives and works in Cairo, Egypt. His paintings have been exhibited in Sudan, the Middle East, East Africa, Europe and the United States and are held in notable museum collections, including the Museum of African Contemporary Art Al Maaden (MACAAL) in Marrakesh, the Sharjah Art Foundation (SAF) in the UAE, the Zeitz Museum of Contemporary Art Africa MOCAA in Cape Town, the Minneapolis Institute of Art (MIA) and the Centre Pompidou in Paris.

== Life and artistic career ==
Elmur is known as a painter, filmmaker, photographer, illustrator, and author of several children's books. He studied at the College of Fine and Applied Arts in Khartoum and obtained his degree in graphic design from Sudan University of Science and Technology in 1989. Next, he worked as graphic designer for Sudanow magazine. Following the military coup that brought Omar al-Bashir to power in 1989, Elmur moved to Nairobi: “I fled to Kenya when they [security forces] arrested me for drawing a cartoon for the magazine depicting the coup.” he says. Four years later, Elmur relocated to Cairo, with frequent visits to his home country.

Elmur grew up in a family of fishermen in a village on the Blue Nile, and memories of his childhood have been a recurrent influence on his painting. Another inspiration have been studio photographs of sitters that he inherited from his father's photographic studio. Several of his paintings were inspired by the Sunut Forest near the confluence of the White Nile and Blue Nile, where Khartoumites used to spend their free time. Fruits are another preferred subject of Elmur. They can be found again and again in his paintings, just like people and animals. His works feature insects, fruits and people. Time and again, it is the bird in various forms and colours that he depicts in those paintings – sitting on the head of a person or on an arm, rocking on a rope or flying high above the other images.

His painting style has been described as surrealistic, but not to the point of incomprehensibility. He favors bold tones in thick paint strokes complemented with occasional shades of lighter hues. "The colours in my paintings are very strong because of the sun in my country and also because of the people there, who love to wear colourful clothes," said Elmur. The subjects express unreserved emotional capacities; although the paintings do not include significant events or action, each face appears to have a story behind it. The curator of an exhibition at the residence of the European Commission in Cairo, organised and arranged by Mashrabia Gallery described his works saying "His paintings are full of symbols and rituals, but it is never clear what they really are – that makes them very mysterious and attractive."

As a filmmaker, Elmur has directed and produced six short films, stylistically situated between documentary and fantasy film. He won the Jury Prize (special acknowledgement) for his film "Heaven's Bird" at the International Short Film festival "Images that matter" in Ethiopia in 2010.

Elmur has also been active as writer or illustrator of international children's literature, such as Hamdi Abo Golayyel's Heroes of Old and several other illustrated books in Arabic, French, English, Italian, German and Spanish.

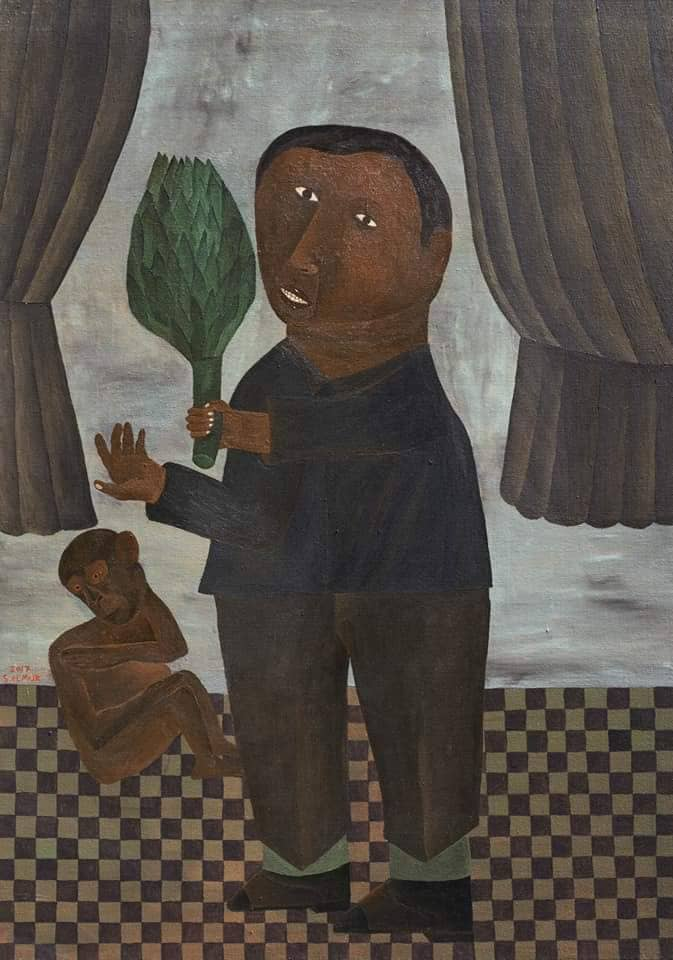
Salah Elmur: A Monkey and an Artichoke, Acrylic on canvas, 185 x 185 cm, 2017

Elmur is married with Souad Abdelrassoul (b.1974), an Egyptian artist, and they live in Cairo.

== Reception and exhibitions ==
Elmur has participated in group and solo exhibitions in the Middle East, East Africa, Europe, Canada and the United States. His works are held by the Museum of African Contemporary Art Al Maaden (MACAAL) in Marrakesh, the Sharjah Art Foundation (SAF) in the UAE, the Zeitz Museum of Contemporary Art Africa MOCAA in Cape Town, the Minneapolis Institute of Art (MIA) and the Weisman Art Museum in Minneapolis, and the Centre Pompidou in Paris.

In 2013, Elmur's exhibition "Eyes Stream" drew inspiration from the name of an ancient wall in Cairo, called "Wall of Hungarian Eyes." He meditated on the name, and decided to explore the human eye in a recent series of paintings. His 2011 series called "Circus" features strong colours, as well as Elmur's distinctive figurative, yet abstract style. There is the brown horse with the bright-orange roller skates under his hooves or the man with his tongue sticking out, ready to bite into a ripe slice of watermelon – a reference to the people who came to the circus with their picnics, when he was a child growing up in Sudan.

In February 2018, an exhibition inspired by the childhood and early life of Elmur, called Fragrances of the Forest and Photos presenting more than 70 artworks was on show at the Sharjah Art Museum, United Arab Emirates. Here, his paintings lead the viewer through a personal voyage of discovery, showing some of his experiences of growing up in Khartoum. The works showed his exploration of the city's streets and the surrounding countryside as a child.

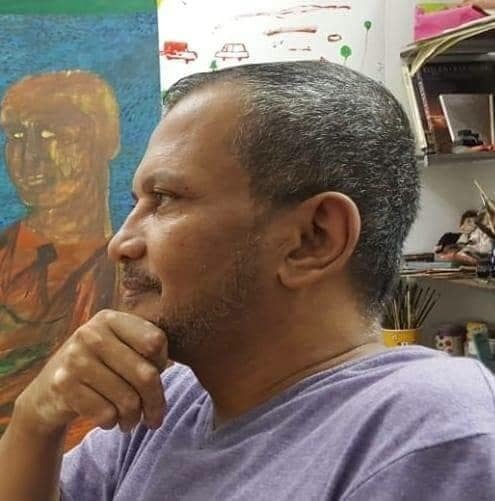
Salah Elmur

In September 2018, Elmur took part in a group show with Kamala Ishaq and Ibrahim El-Salahi at Saatchi Gallery in London, entitled Forests and Spirits: Figurative art from the Khartoum School. This exhibition intended to bring wider attention to contemporary African art and the influence of the Khartoum School, an art movement originating from the city's College of Fine and Applied Arts in the 1960s.

The 2023 exhibition of his paintings in two London galleries was titled Central Electricity and Water Administration, with paintings inspired by his childhood memories of the public utilities company in Khartoum. The accompanying catalogue Memories from a Tin Box presented his works, photographs from his archives and images from his sketchbooks. Editors Mary Aravanis and Michael Obert contributed essays and notes on Elmur's work and career.

== Major exhibitions ==
- Salah Elmur Fragrances of the Forest and Photos, Sharjah Art Museum, United Arab Emirates, 2018
- Forests and Spirits: figurative art from the Khartoum School. SALON at Saatchi Gallery, London, UK, 2018.
- Salah Elmur. EXPO Chicago, April 2022
- Central Electricity and Water Administration, Gallery 1957 and Vigo Gallery, London, 2023.

== See also ==
- Visual arts of Sudan
- Cinema of Sudan
