= La Caravana del manuscrito andalusí =

- Directed by: Lidia Peralta García
- Screenplay by: Lidia Peralta García
- Produced by: CEDECOM S.L.
- Cinematography: Lidia Peralta García
- Edited by: Lidia Peralta García, David Moya
- Music by: Kristian Hernández, Yengo-Le
- Release date: 2007
- Running time: 49 minutes
- Country: Spain

La Caravana del manuscrito andalusí is a 2007 documentary film directed by Lidia Peralta García.

== Synopsis ==
During the 12th and 15th centuries, in Muslim Spain, many science books were written. When Muslims left Spain, many took their manuscripts with them. Today, one can find them spread in particular libraries, all along the caravan route through Morocco, Mauritania and Mali. From Toledo to Timbuktu, this documentary follows their traces. Its protagonist, Ismael Diadié Haidara, owner of the Andalus Library of Timbuktu, has spent years trying to retrieve his family's manuscripts and with them, his own Al Andalus past.

== Production ==
The film was produced with the assistance of CEDECOM Malaga. The director, Lidia Peralta García, traveled for five months and covered over 6,000 kilometres (3,700 mi) on the route from Toledo in Spain to Timbuktu in Mali to make the documentary. According to Peralta, "a documentary like this makes you very aware that for many centuries we have shared the same history, while today some have white skin and others black".

== Awards ==
La Caravana del manuscrito andalusí won the Best Documentary Film prize at the 10th International Panorama of Independent Films. It was also nominated for Best Documentary Film at the 2008 Marbella International Film Festival.

== See also ==
- List of Islam-related films
