= Sudan University of Science and Technology =

University in Khartoum State, Sudan

Coordinates: 15°35′57″N 32°30′48″E

Sudan University of Science and Technology (SUST)
- جامعة السودان للعلوم والتكنولوجيا
- Former names: Khartoum Technical Institute (KTI) (1950); Khartoum Polytechnique (KP) (1975)
- Type: Public
- Established: 1902; 124 years ago
- Vice-Chancellor: Prof. Eisa Bashier Mohamed Eltayeb
- Academic staff: 2500 (Permanent staff)
- Undergraduates: 72,000
- Postgraduates: 11,000
- Doctoral students: 260
- Location: Khartoum State, Sudan
- Campuses: 10
- Website: www.sustech.edu

Sudan University of Science and Technology (abbreviated SUST) is one of the largest public universities in Sudan, with ten campuses in Khartoum state. The main campus is located in the so-called Al Mugran area of Khartoum, the confluence of the White Nile and the Blue Nile.

== History ==
SUST was founded in colonial Sudan as the Khartoum Technical School and School of Commerce in 1902. Later, the School of Radiology (1932) and School of Design (1946) and School of Commerce merged with the Khartoum Technical School to form the Khartoum Technical Institute (KTI) in 1950.

The Shambat Institute of Agriculture (1954), Khartoum Senior Trade School (1962), Institute of Music and Drama and the Higher Institute of Physical Education (1969) were also added and renamed as Khartoum Polytechnic Institute (KP) in 1975. In 1990, this became the Sudan University of Science and Technology.

The university was heavily damaged during the Sudanese civil war (2023–present), when the Rapid Support Forces (RSF) attacked its campuses. University officials said all of its 300 laboratories, valued at $220 million, had been destroyed, while 5,000 computers and 50 new dental chairs were lost in the medical complex, along with more than 27 electrical transformers. The RSF was also accused of burning the library of the College of Forestry and musical instruments for fuel. In addition, mass graves containing around 1,000 bodies were dug on land reserved for a medical complex hospital near Obaid Khatim Street.

== Colleges and Schools ==
- College of Graduate Studies
- College of Engineering
- College of Petroleum Engineering and Technology
- College of Water and Environmental Engineering
- College of Industries Engineering and Technology
- College of Architecture and Planning
- College of Computer Science and Information Technology
- College of Medicine
- College of Dentistry
- College of Pharmacy
- College of Medical Laboratories Science
- College of Medical Radiologic Sciences
- College of Science
- College of Agricultural Studies
- College of Veterinary Medicine
- College of Animal Production Science and Technology
- College of Forestry and Range Science
- College of Business Studies
- College of Languages
- College of Education
- College of Fine and Applied Arts
- College of Music and Drama
- College of Physical Education and Sports
- College of Communication Science
- College of Technology

== Campuses ==
SUST has 10 campuses located in Khartoum, the capital and largest city of Sudan, as well as in Khartoum State. The main campus is located in Al Mugran area of Khartoum.

== Facilities ==
=== Libraries ===
SUST libraries are part of each campus and managed by the Deanship of Libraries Affairs. The Libraries' collection includes books, eBooks, print and electronic holdings of scholarly journal subscriptions, microforms, music recordings, a sizable map collection and a documentary department. In particular, SUST libraries include 12 distinct facilities:

- Library of Veterinary Medicine and Animal Production
- Library of Agricultural Studies
- Library of Forestry and Range Science
- Library of Engineering
- Library of Industrial Engineering
- Library of Medical Radiological Sciences
- Library of Water Science and Technology
- Library of Physical Education
- Library of Petroleum Engineering and Technology
- Library of Communication Science
- Library of Computer Science and Information Technology
- Library of Medical Sciences

Also, SUST has a distinguished digital repository.

=== Sports facilities ===
SUST is home to the only college for physical education and sports in Sudan. Many of these facilities are available to students, staff and members of the public.

== Rankings ==
SUST ranked first of Sudanese universities in Webometrics classification of international universities and institutes successively in July 2021 and in January 2022

SUST has been listed in the eighteenth QS World University Rankings in May 2021.

In May 2021, SUST ranked first among Sudanese universities in May 2021 edition of Webometrics rankings of digital repositories, where it ranked 190 out of 4,403 institutional repositories and ranked 205 out of 4,579 repositories globally.

== UNESCO Chair ==
The university hosts the UNESCO Chair for Women in Science and Technology , which was established at the initiative of Prof. Fatima Abdel Mahmoud, who later became the first chairholder.

== Notable people ==
=== Notable academics ===
- Abdul Hakim Al-Taher: Sudanese theater director and actor
- Ahmed Shibrain: Sudanese Modernist painter, alumni and former dean of the College of Fine and Applied Art
- Elfatih Hussien: Sudanese musician, author and critic. One of the pillars of music in Sudan and dean of the college of music and drama
- Faisal Ahmed Saad: Sudanese theater actor and comedian.

=== Notable alumni ===
- Abdel Aziz El Mubarak: Sudanese singer
- Adil Babikir: a Sudanese literary critic and translator
- Afaf Al-Sadiq: Sudanese poet, journalist, and academic
- Ali Madhi Nouri: Sudanese actor, stage director who was designated UNESCO Artist for Peace in October 2012
- Ashraf Al-Dabain: Jordanian writer and novelist
- Hadi Mohamed Ahmed Eltigani: Sudanese professor, Quality and corporate excellence expert, twice winner of the Harrington-Ishikawa Professional Medal and awarded the President's Award for Demonstrated Excellence by Asia Pacific Quality Organization (APQO)
- Hassan Musa: Sudanese pioneer in contemporary art and zoomorphic calligraphy.
- Ibrahim Mursal: Norwegian film director of Sudanese and Somali origins
- Kamala Ibrahim Ishaq: Sudanese artist
- Mazahir Salih: Sudanese-American Community activist and Iowa City Councilmember
- Mohammed Abbaro or Mo Abdalla is a Sudanese ceramicist and potter
- Mohamed Nureldin Abdallah: Sudanese photojournalist, worked for Reuters, Agence France-Presse, Oxford Analytica.
- Saeed Zaki: Sudanese communication analyst, diplomat, the first appointed youth ambassador for the Republic of Sudan by the International Olympic Committee (IOC)
- Sharhabil Ahmed: Sudanese singer, has been called "The King of Sudanese Jazz"
- Stephen Dhieu Dau: South Sudanese politician, banker, first Minister of Petroleum and Mining in South Sudan
- Taysir El Nourani: Sudanese minister of Labour and Administrative Reform of Sudan

== Affiliations with international universities ==
- Multimedia University, Malaysia
- Limkokwing University of Creative Technology, Malaysia
- International Centre for Theoretical Physics, Italy
- Norwegian University of Science and Technology
- University of Tromsø, Norway
- University of Oslo, Norway
- University of Tennessee, United States
- Boston University, U.S.
- California Institute of Technology, U.S.

== Accreditation ==
- African Quality Rating Mechanism (AQRM), 2017
- Ministry of Higher Education and Scientific Research, Sudan
- World Textile University Alliance
- Association of African Universities (AUU)
- Educause Membership for International Institutions

== See also ==
- Education in Sudan
- List of Islamic educational institutions
