= List of diplomatic missions in Sudan =

This is a list of diplomatic missions in Sudan. Many countries have closed, temporarily suspended, or relocated their diplomatic missions in Khartoum due to the 2023 Sudan conflict.

== Diplomatic missions in Khartoum ==
=== Embassies ===
1. Algeria
2. Bahrain
3. Brazil
4. Central African Republic
5. Chad
6. China
7. Congo-Kinshasa
8. Egypt
9. Eritrea
10. Ethiopia
11. Iraq
12. Jordan
13. Kuwait
14. Lebanon
15. Libya
16. Malaysia
17. Mauritania
18. Morocco
19. Nigeria
20. Oman
21. Pakistan
22. Palestine
23. Qatar
24. Rwanda
25. Somalia
26. Syria
27. Tanzania
28. Tunisia
29. Uganda
30. Yemen
31. Zimbabwe

=== Other delegations or missions ===
- United Nations (Resident Coordinator's Office)

== Diplomatic missions in Port Sudan ==
The following countries have relocated their embassies to Port Sudan, the country's main seaport and capital of the Red Sea State, as a result of intense fighting in Khartoum in the ongoing civil war. In was in this city that the internationally-recognized government of Sudan temporarily relocated its seat, from April 2023 to January 2026, when it announced its return to Khartoum.

1. Djibouti
2. India
3. Indonesia
4. Russia
5. Saudi Arabia
6. South Sudan
7. Turkey

== Consular missions ==
=== Khartoum ===
- Mali (Consulate-General)
- Niger (Consulate-General)

=== Al-Gadarif, Al Qadarif State ===
- Ethiopia (Consulate-General)

=== Al-Fashir, North Darfur State ===
- Libya (Consulate-General)

=== Geneina, West Darfur State ===
- Chad (Consulate-General)

=== Port Sudan, Red Sea State ===
- Egypt (Consulate-General)

=== Wadi Halfa, Northern State ===
- Egypt (Consulate)

== Non-resident embassies accredited to Sudan ==
=== Resident in Addis Ababa, Ethiopia ===
1. Angola
2. Canada
3. Denmark
4. Zambia
5. Seychelles

=== Resident in Cairo, Egypt ===
1. Argentina
2. Armenia
3. Australia
4. Austria
5. Belarus
6. Belgium
7. Bosnia & Herzegovina
8. Bulgaria
9. Cameroon
10. Colombia
11. Croatia
12. Cuba
13. Cyprus
14. Czechia
15. Equatorial Guinea
16. Finland
17. Greece
18. Hungary
19. Ivory Coast
20. Malta
21. Mali
22. Mexico
23. Nepal
24. Philippines
25. Poland
26. Portugal
27. Serbia
28. Sierra Leone
29. Slovakia
30. Sri Lanka
31. Ukraine
32. Thailand
33. Vietnam

=== Resident elsewhere ===
1. Congo-Brazzaville (N'Djamena)
2. Iceland (Reykjavík)
3. Ireland (Nairobi)
4. Jamaica (Pretoria)
5. Paraguay (Rabat)
6. Sweden (Stockholm)

=== Unverified locations ===
- Afghanistan
- Brunei
- Cape Verde (Rome)
- Costa Rica (Abu Dhabi)
- Dominica (London)
- Ecuador
- Guatemala
- Guinea
- Guinea-Bissau (Algiers)
- Haiti (Rome)
- Honduras (Rome)
- Kyrgyzstan (Riyadh)
- Laos (Kuwait City)
- Maldives (Riyadh)
- Mongolia
- Nicaragua
- Nauru (Suva)
- New Zealand
- North Korea
- Papua New Guinea (New Delhi)
- Panama (Riyadh)
- Peru
- Turkmenistan (Riyadh)
- Togo (Addis Ababa)
- Tajikistan (Riyadh)
- Timor-Leste (Geneva)
- Tonga (Abu Dhabi)
- Uzbekistan (Riyadh)
- Uruguay
- Zimbabwe (Addis Ababa)

== Closed Missions ==
Host city	Sending country	Mission	Year closed	Ref.
Khartoum	Bangladesh	Embassy	2023 (Note: Closed due to the ongoing civil war.)	
Khartoum	Bulgaria	Embassy	2010	
Khartoum	Canada	Embassy	2023	
Khartoum	Denmark	Embassy	2012	
Khartoum	European Union	Delegation	2023	
Khartoum	France	Embassy	2023	
Khartoum	Germany	Embassy	2023	
Khartoum	Greece	Embassy	2015	
Khartoum	Holy See	Embassy	2023	
Khartoum	Hungary	Embassy	Unknown	
Khartoum	Iran	Embassy	2016	
Khartoum	Italy	Embassy	2023	
Khartoum	Japan	Embassy	2023	
Khartoum	Netherlands	Embassy	2023	
Khartoum	Norway	Embassy	2023	
Khartoum	Kenya	Embassy	2023	
Khartoum	Romania	Embassy	2021	
Khartoum	South Africa	Embassy	2023	
Khartoum	South Korea	Embassy	2023	
Khartoum	Sovereign Military Order of Malta	Embassy	2022	
Khartoum	Spain	Embassy	2023	
Khartoum	Sweden	Embassy	2023	
Khartoum	Switzerland	Embassy	2023	
Khartoum	United Kingdom	Embassy	2023	
Khartoum	United States	Embassy	2023	
Khartoum	Venezuela	Embassy	2023	
Port Sudan	United Arab Emirates	Embassy	2025 (Note: The embassy was relocated to Port Sudan due to the ongoing civil war. Was closed in 2025 as a result of severance of relations with Sudan.)	

== See also ==
- Foreign relations of Sudan
- List of diplomatic missions of Sudan
