= Sudan University College of Engineering Sciences =

Coordinates: 15.5990°N 32.5129°E

College of Engineering
- كلية الهندسة
- Former names: College of Engineering and Scientific Studies (1975-1983)
- Established: 1975
- Students: 12000
- Location: Khartoum, Sudan
- Website: engineering.sustech.edu

The College of Engineering at Sudan University of Science and Technology was founded in 1975.

== History ==
The college was founded in 1975 after merging six different independent institutes.

- Institute of Technical Teachers
- Institute of Technicians for Civil Engineering and Architecture
- Institute of Technicians for Mechanical and Electrical Engineering
- Institute of Textile Technicians
- Institute of Surveying Technicians
- Institute of Laboratory Technicians

These institutes became departments of the college, which was called the College of Engineering and Scientific Studies at that time.

== Offered Degrees ==
The college directly offers 24 BEng and BTech bachelor degrees with honors.

- Engineering Diploma: Undergraduate course usually can be earned in two to three years (four or six semesters).
- Master of Science
- Doctoral Degrees

== Schools and Departments ==
=== School of Survey Engineering ===
- Department of Geodesy
- Department of Remote Sensing
- Department of Geographical Information Systems

=== School of Civil Engineering ===
- Department of Transportation Engineering

=== School of Electrical and Nuclear Engineering ===
- Department of Control Engineering
- Department of Power and Machines Engineering
- Department of Nuclear Engineering

=== School of Electronics Engineering ===
- Department of Communication Engineering
- Department of Computer Engineering
- Department of Industrial Electronics

=== School of Mechanical Engineering ===
- Department of Manufacturing Engineering
- Department of Power Engineering
