= Ahmed Shibrain =

Sudanese Modernist painter (1931–2017)

Ahmed Shibrain, also known as Ahmad Mohammad Shibrain (Arabic: احمد محمد شبرين, 1931 – 23 March 2017) was a Sudanese Modernist painter and Dean of the College of Fine and Applied Art in Khartoum.

== Life and artistic career ==
Shibrain was born in 1931 in Berber, Sudan. He studied Fine Arts at the School of Design at the Khartoum Technical Institute (KTI) and at the Central School of Art and Design in London, England. In 1972, he was Commissioner for Art in the Sudanese Ministry of Youth and later also Secretary of Culture in the Ministry of Culture and Information. In 1975, he became dean of the College of Fine and Applied Art at the Sudan University of Science and Technology.

Along with Ibrahim El-Salahi, Shibrain is considered one of the leading representatives of the art movement called School of Khartoum that combined Islamic, African and Western artistic traditions. Both artists are also representatives of the so-called hurufiyya-movement (derived from the Arabic word for letter), as they developed contemporary pictorial representation from traditional Arabic calligraphy. Shibrain's large-format calligraphy, in which the words of Islamic texts are interpreted as independent ornaments and images, attracted international attention.

Among other collections, his works are represented in the collections of the Barjeel Art Foundation in the United Arab Emirates and of the National Archives (formerly Harmon Foundation) in Washington, D.C.

Shibrain died in Khartoum on 23 March 2017, aged 82.

== Major exhibitions ==
- 1967: 9. São Paulo Art Biennal
- 1974: Contemporary African Art. National Museum of African Art, Washington
- 1996: The Right to Write. National Gallery, Amman, Jordan
