= Berber, Sudan =

Berber بربر
- Town
- Location in Sudan
- Coordinates: 18°01′50″N 33°59′36″E
- Country: Sudan
- State: River Nile

Population (1989)
  - Total: 16,650

Berber (Arabic: بربر, romanized: barbar) is a town in the River Nile state of northern Sudan, 50 kilometres (31 mi) north of Atbara, near the junction of the Atbara River and the Nile.

== Overview ==
The town was the starting-point of the old caravan route across the Nubian Desert to the Red Sea at Suakin and flagged in importance after the 1906 completion of a spur of the Sudan Military Railway to Suakin from a junction closer to the Atbara River.

English explorer Samuel Baker passed through Berber on his discovery of Albert Nyanza Lake, in 1861.

== Artistic interpretation ==
In his December 2023 illustrated essay titled "Between Wakefulness and Dreams in Sudan", Sudanese art curator Rahiem Shadad wrote about the artistic photographic work of photographer Hassan Kamil, who was born and brought up in Berber. According to Shadad, a significant part of Kamil's work is dedicated to exploring the town's neglect, while also highlighting its often overlooked beauty and richness. Shadad interpreted the images in the context of the country's economic and social disparities, displacement by the civil war that started in 2023, and the previous decades of Islamist rule under Omar al-Bashir.

== Notable people ==
- Ahmed Shibrain
