= Reem Aljeally =

Sudanese visual artist and art curator, born 1997

- Born: Arabic: ريم الجعيلي; 1997 (age 28–29); Khartoum, Sudan
- Education: University of Khartoum
- Known for: painting, curating
- Movement: contemporary visual art from Sudan
- Website: reemaljeally.com

Reem Aljeally, also spelled Reem Al Jeally, (Arabic: ريم الجعيلي; born 1997 in Khartoum, Sudan) is a Sudanese visual artist and art curator based in Cairo, Egypt. Apart from her own paintings on canvas or open spaces, she is known as curator of Sudanese art exhibitions as well as for her organization The Muse Multi Studios. With this organization, she has been promoting Sudanese artist through networking, workshops and publications.

== Life and career ==
Aljeally graduated with a Bachelor of Arts in Architecture from the University of Khartoum in 2018. Following this, she studied drawing and oil painting at Khartoum Arts Training Centre and had her first exhibition in 2017. Her artistic style of painting is characterized by her choice of strong colours, surreal shapes and a focus on storytelling. This includes her prominent female figures and their relationship with identity, culture, and social issues. Further, her portraits have been described as "intimate and powerful", showing abstract persons with "over-exaggerated eyes and in [...] skin coloured an unnatural shade."

During the 2019 Sudanese Revolution, Aljeally documented the important role of Sudanese women, who had been largely marginalized during the preceding 30 years of military dictatorship, in several mural paintings in public spaces. One of them was named with the words of a Sudanese poet as “Noura dreams of an existence that has no restrictions, a homeland that has no borders, no soldiers, no oppressed, no oppressors”. Apart from painting, Aljeally has also ventured into the genre of portrait photography. She added this genre of visual art to her portfolio during the project “New Spaces – Media Labs” organized by the German cultural centre in Khartoum and addressing young, creative artists and independent media organisations.

In 2019, Aljeally founded the cultural organization "The Muse Multi Studios". They aim to support Sudanese visual artists through curating, workshops, as well as traditional and online publications. These activities have made the work of Sudanese artists better known, both with Sudanese, as well as across the wider Middle East and North Africa. In September 2023, the organization published the first issue of The Muse Magazine both in print and online.

Like other Sudanese artists, Aljeally fled to Cairo after the outbreak of the war in Sudan in April 2023.

== Reception ==
To support Sudanese artists in exile, art curator Rahiem Shaddad of Downtown Gallery in Khartoum has been active in promoting contemporary visual art of Sudan since 2019. After the outbreak of the Sudanese civil war in April 2023, he co-curated a group exhibition titled Disturbance in the Nile, including works by Sudanese artists Rashid Diab, Mohammed A. Otaybi, herself and others for galleries in Lisbon, Portugal, and Madrid, Spain. On this occasion, Shaddad called Aljeally an example of Sudanese "artists who came after the revolution, when individuality began to emerge in the art world and people began to talk about what happens, not only in collective spaces, but in private spaces." In March 2024, Aljeally co-curated an exhibition of works by Salah El Mur, Amna Elhassan, herself and four other Sudanese artists in a private gallery in Hamburg, Germany.

Commenting on her style and intentions, the artist has been quoted saying:

In my work, [...] a significant element [...] allows me to blend personal stories with the collective concerns of Sudanese women. It’s a starting point for musings into identity, growth, belonging, womanhood. The amplified effect that accompanies those eyes is meant to make the viewer a little uncomfortable, just enough to feel something.

— Reem Aljeally, Sudanese visual artist and curator

== Exhibitions ==
=== Group exhibitions ===
- Disturbance in The Nile, Broteria Art Gallery / Downtown Gallery, Lisbon, Portugal, June – July 2023 and Casa Arabe, Madrid, Spain, March – May 2024
- The Wandering of Dreams, Gallery Melike Bilir, Hamburg, Germany, February – March 2024
- Home: A Daydream, Tribal gallery, Nairobi, Kenya, October 2023
- The Gold of the Grandmother, Mouches Volantes, Cologne, Germany, July 2023
- Surfacing, Tewasart Gallery, Kampala, Uganda, May 2023
- The forest and desert school revisited, Circle Art Gallery, Nairobi, Kenya | November – December 2022
- Bad posture, Ecelectica contemporary, Cape Town, South Africa | May 2022
- Art in Isolation: Creativity in the Time of Covid-19
- Group exhibition at the Middle East Institute, Washington D.C. | November 2020 – January 2021

== Selected publications ==
- Inside the corner pink house. The Muse multi studios, 2024

== See also ==
- Visual arts of Sudan - 20th century modern art
- Photography in Sudan - Contemporary photographers
