= Lidia Peralta García =

Spanish journalist and filmmaker (born 1970)

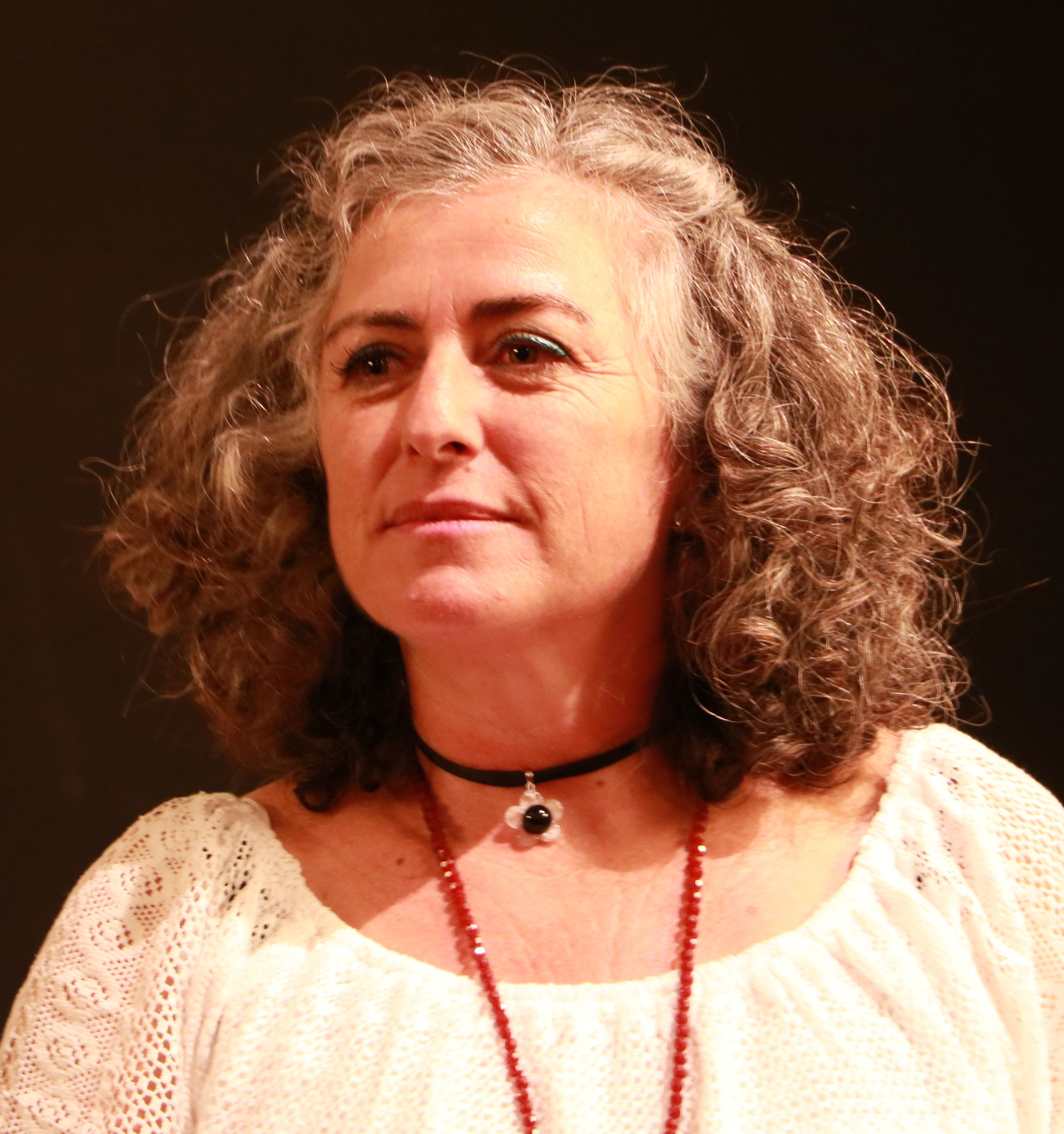
- Lidia Peralta García
- Born: 1970 (age 55–56)
- Occupations: Journalist and documentary filmmaker
- Known for: La Caravana del manuscrito andalusí

Lidia Peralta García (born 1970) is a Spanish journalist and filmmaker.

Lidia Peralta García was born in Granada, Spain in 1970. For several years she studied translation and interpretation, then spent several years travelling in the Middle East, Asia and Africa. In 2000, she obtained a degree in journalism from the faculty of Sciences de la Communication of Malaga. From 2001 she has been a writer and host of the TV show "Tesis", shown on Channel 2 in Andalusia. This is based on socio-cultural programs of the Andalusian public university.

Her 2007 documentary La Caravana del manuscrito andalusí (The caravan of the manuscripts from Al-Andalus) won the Best Documentary Film prize at the 10th International Panorama of Independent Films. It was also nominated for Best Documentary Film at the 2008 Marbella International Film Festival. Her film A House Of Bernarda Alba was selected for the 8th Aljazeera International Documentary Film Festival.

== Filmography ==
Year	Title	Role	Notes
2000	Carmen, reina de los pescadores	Director	Documentary
2003	Bereberes del Alto Atlas	Director	Documentary
2004	Mohammed, el pequeño guía de Tombuctú	Director	Documentary
2004	Tanan Djare, impresiones de Burkina Faso a través de los cuatro elementos	Director	Documentary
2005	Al-Andalus en el espejo	Director	Documentary
2006	Alas Sobre Dakar	Director	Documentary
2007	La Caravana del manuscrito andalusí (The caravan of the manuscripts from Al-Andalus)	Director,	50 minutes. Documentary
2009	A Proposito de Sudan (Voyage Espoir)	Director	25 minutes
2010	Alas Sobre Khartoum (Wings Over Khartoum)	Director	65 minutes. Contemporary Sudan through the eyes of four Sudanese sisters devoted to the world of arts
