= Rufaa (city) =

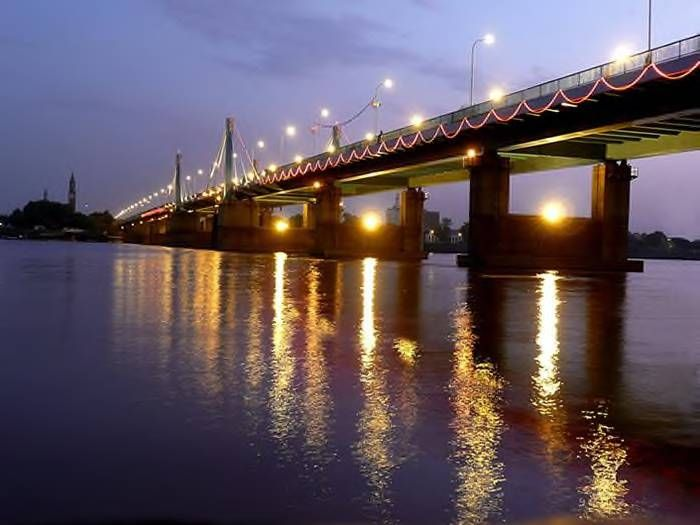
- The bridge between Rufaa and Al-Hasaheisa

- Location in Sudan
- Coordinates: 14°46′N 33°21.4′E
- Country: Sudan
- State: Al Jazirah

Population (2010)
  - Total: Approx. 100,000

Rufaa is a city in the Al Jazirah state in east-central Sudan.

The twin city of Al-Hasaheisa (Arabic: الحَصَاحِيصَا) lies on the eastern bank of the Blue Nile.

On 18 December 2023, the city was seized by the Rapid Support Forces during the War in Sudan. By 14 January 2025, the SAF recaptured the village.

== Notable residents ==
- Osman Waqialla
