= Boy.Brother.Friend =

British fashion magazine

- Editor: Matthew Benson
- Categories: Fashion
- Founder: Kk Obi
- Founded: May 8, 2020; 6 years ago
- Country: United Kingdom
- Based in: London, UK
- Language: English
- Website: boybrotherfriend.com

Boy.Brother.Friend is a bi-annual fashion magazine that covers contemporary art, fashion, and social theory, focusing on the Black diaspora and male identities.

== History ==
In 2017, while working at a small men's publication, KK Obi, the magazine's co-founder, made a zine called Boy.Brother.Friend. It was well-received and led to a collaboration with LN-CC (Late Night Cameleon Café ), a fashion store. Since its launch in 2020, Boy.Brother.Friend has featured the work of numerous prominent theorists, authors, artists, and designers including Paul Mendez (Issue 4), Riccardo Tisci and Michaela Coel (Issue 8), Kara Walker (Issue 9), the Sudanese filmmaker Hassan Kamil (Issue 6), and others.
