= Mo Abbaro =

Sudanese ceramicist (1933–2016)

- Born: Mohammed Ahmed Abdalla Abbaro; 17 October 1933; Abu Jibayha, Sudan
- Died: 12 March 2016 (aged 82); London, England
- Other names: Mo Abdalla; Mohammed Abdalla Abbaro; Mohmed Abdalla; Mo Abdalla Abbaro
- Education: Khartoum Technical Institute; Central School of Arts and Crafts; North Staffordshire College of Ceramics
- Occupations: Ceramicist and potter
- Spouse: Rose Glennie (m. 1964)
- Children: 3

Mo Abbaro (17 October 1933 – 12 March 2016), also known professionally as Mo Abdalla or Mohammed Ahmed Abdalla Abbaro, was a London-based Sudanese ceramicist and potter, who has been described by artist Oliver Bloom as "one of the world's finest ceramicists".

== Life and career ==
Mohammed Ahmed Abdalla Abbaro was born in Abu Jibayha, Sudan. He graduated in Fine and Applied Arts from Khartoum Technical Institute in 1958, the following year winning a scholarship to London to study ceramics at the Central School of Arts and Crafts. He did postgraduate studies in industrial pottery design at the North Staffordshire College of Ceramics, after which he had a period of training in chemical analyses of ceramics materials at the North Staffs College of Ceramics Technology. He went back to Sudan to teach ceramics for some years, but decided to return to England in 1966 to pursue his career in Britain.

He taught ceramics at the Camden Arts Centre for more than two decades, and had many exhibitions in London—including at the Barbican Centre, the Whitechapel Gallery (as part of Africa '95), the Mall Galleries, and the Iraqi Cultural Centre—and elsewhere in the UK, as well as in the US and Sweden. His studio and showroom were in King Henry's Road, close to Primrose Hill.

He turned to writing in later life, publishing works on ceramic technique, such as Modern Ceramics—On the Interplay of Forms and Surfaces (2000), as well as on his own family history, including The History of the Abbaros of Sudan since the 15th Century (1997).

His ceramics are in the collections of London's British Museum, the Institut du Monde Arabe in Paris, and the Smithsonian Museum, Washington. His work was shown in Frederique Cifuentes's 2017 exhibition Sudan: Emergence of Singularities at the P21 Gallery, London.

== Family ==
He was married to Rose (née Glennie), since 1964, daughter of composer Elisabeth Lutyens and granddaughter of Sir Edwin Lutyens.

Abbaro died aged 80 in London on 12 March 2016, survived by his wife and their son and two daughters.

== See also ==
- Visual arts of Sudan
