= Ibrahim El-Salahi =

Sudanese visual artist and former public servant

- Born: 5 September 1930 (age 96); Omdurman, Sudan
- Education: School of Design, Gordon Memorial College (now University of Khartoum); Slade School of Fine Art, London (1954-1957)
- Known for: Visual arts
- Movement: African Modernism, contemporary art, Hurufiyya movement
- Awards: Prince Claus Award

Ibrahim El-Salahi (Arabic: إبراهيم الصلحي, born 5 September 1930) is a Sudanese painter, former public servant and diplomat. He is one of the foremost visual artists of the Khartoum School, considered part of African Modernism and the pan-Arabic Hurufiyya art movement, that combined traditional forms of Islamic calligraphy with contemporary artworks. On the occasion of the Tate Modern gallery's first retrospective exhibition of a contemporary artist from Africa in 2013, El-Salahi's work was characterized as "a new Sudanese visual vocabulary, which arose from his own pioneering integration of Islamic, African, Arab and Western artistic traditions."

== Early life ==
Ibrahim El-Salahi was born on 5 September 1930 in El-Abbasyia, a neighborhood of Omdurman, Sudan, to a Muslim family and is considered to be one of the most important contemporary African artists. His father was in charge of a Qur'anic school, where El-Salahi learned to read and write and to practice Arabic calligraphy, that later became an important element in his artwork. He also is a distant cousin of Sudanese human rights lawyer Amin Mekki Medani.

From 1949 to 1950, he studied Fine Art at the School of Design of the Gordon Memorial College, which later became the University of Khartoum. Supported by a scholarship, he subsequently went to the Slade School of Fine Art in London from 1954 to 1957. At this art school, El-Salahi was exposed to European schooling, modern circles, and the works of artists that gradually influenced his art. Studying in London also allowed him to take formal and ideological cues from modernist painting, which helped him to achieve a balance between pure expression and gestural freedom. In 1962, he received a UNESCO scholarship to study in the United States, from where he visited South America. From 1964 to 1965, he returned to the US with the support of the Rockefeller Foundation, and in 1966, he led the Sudanese delegation during the first World Festival of Black Arts in Dakar, Senegal. In addition to representing Sudan in the World Festival of Black Arts, El-Salahi was part of the Sudanese delegation at the first Pan-African Cultural Festival in Algiers in 1969. Both of these events were important and significant in modern African art movements.

== Career ==
After the completion of his education, he returned to Sudan. During this period, he used Arabic calligraphy and other elements of Islamic culture that played a role in his everyday life. Trying to connect to his heritage, El-Salahi began to fill his work with symbols and markings of small Arabic inscriptions. As he became more advanced with incorporating Arabic calligraphy into his work, the symbols began to produce animals, humans, and plant forms, providing new meaning to his artwork. El-Salahi learned to combine European artistic styles with traditional Sudanese themes, which resulted in an African-influenced kind of surrealism. From 1969 until 1972, El-Salahi was assistant cultural attaché at the Sudanese Embassy in London. After that, he returned to Sudan as Director of Culture in Jaafar Nimeiri's government, and then was Undersecretary in the Ministry of Culture and Information until September 1975.

=== Imprisonment ===
In 1975, he was imprisoned for six months and eight days without trial for being accused of participating in an anti-government coup.

At the time of El-Salahi's period of incarceration, many intellectuals and some members of the Sudanese Communist Party were sent to prison. El-Salahi's freedom was stripped in Kober Prison in Khartoum; prisoners were not allowed to write or draw, and if a prisoner was to be caught with paper or pencil, he would be punished with solitary confinement for fifteen days. Despite this, El-Salahi was able to find a pencil and often used the brown paper bags that food was distributed with to draw on. El-Salahi would tear the bag into numerous pieces and could use the 25 exercise minutes he received everyday to sketch out ideas for huge paintings. He would also secretly sketch and bury small drawings into the sand to maintain his ideas.

El-Salahi' recalled that the security director told him that had it not been for Bona Malwal they would never have released you, because he was supposed to be executed. El-Salahi was released on 16 March 1976, and did not keep any of the drawings he made in prison; he left them all buried. Next, he rented a house in the Banat region of Omdurman for a short period of time. Two years after his release from prison, he exiled himself from Sudan and for some years worked and lived in Doha, Qatar, before finally settling in Oxford, United Kingdom.

== Artistic production ==
Vision of the Tomb (1965) at the Phillips Collection in 2023

External videos
- Ibrahim El-Salahi,

El-Salahi's work has developed through several phases. His first period during the 1950s, 1960s and 1970s is dominated by elementary forms and lines. During the next two decades, El-Salahi used more subtle, earthy tones in his color palette. In Ibrahim El-Salahi's own words: "I limited my color scheme to sombre tones, using black, white, burnt sienna, and yellow ochre, which resembled the colors of earth and skin color shades of people in our part of the Sudan. Technically it added depth to the picture". The color selection that El-Salahi chose in this formative period reflected the landscape of Sudan, trying to attempt to connect larger concerns of society, whilst creating a unique Sudanese aesthetic through his work. Writing in the Financial Times, critic Jackie Wullschlager said much of El-Salahi's works from this period "are infused with the relentlessly bright Sudanese light, earthy colour and a palpable sense of a parched landscape and dry hot air," noting that works like Vision of the Tomb (1965) typify this style, with "half-perceived shapes and colours emerg[ing]" from the dusky background. After this period, his work became meditative, abstract and organic, using new warm, brilliant colors and abstract human and non-human figures, rendered through geometric shapes.

Much of his work has been characterized by lines, while he mainly uses white and black paint. As El-Salahi has summarized, "There is no painting without drawing and there is no shape without line ... in the end all images can be reduced to lines." Illustrations of this style are included in Tayeb Salih's 1967 edition of Urs al-Zayn (The Wedding of Zein) and 1969 Dumat Wad Hamid (The Doum Tree of Wad Hamid).

El-Salahi is considered a pioneer in Sudanese modern art and was a member of the "Khartoum School of Modern Art", founded by Osman Waqialla, Ahmad Mohammed Shibrain, Tag el-Sir Ahmed and Salahi himself. Other members of this artistic movement in Sudan were poets, novelists, and literary critics of the "Desert School", that also sought to establish a new Sudanese cultural identity. One of the main areas of focus for the Khartoum School was to create a modern Sudanese aesthetic style and not relying only on Western influences. In the 1960s, he was briefly associated with the Mbari Club in Ibadan, Nigeria. In an interview with Sarah Dwider, a curator at the Guggenheim Abu Dhabi, El-Salahi commented about his time spent in Nigeria and the impact it had on his work: "My short visit to Nigeria in the early 1960s gave me the chance to connect artistically with a dynamic part of the African continent, opening myself to influence and be influenced."

He began by exploring Coptic manuscripts, which led him to experiment with Arabic calligraphy. Some of his works like "Allah and the Wall of Confrontation" (1968) and "The Last Sound"(1964) show elements characteristic of Islamic art, such as the shape of the crescent moon. In the late 1970s and early 1980s, El-Salahi lived in exile in Qatar, where he focused on drawing in black and white. Many of his admirers were unaware of his residence in Qatar, and El-Salahi found this distance to be "relieving", as he could use the time to become more experimental. Ultimately, he developed his own style and was among the group of artists to elaborate Arabic calligraphy in his modernist paintings, in a style that became known as Hurufiyya art movement.

In an interview with The Guardian in 2013, El-Salahi explained how he came to use calligraphy in his artworks. Following his return to Sudan in 1957, he was disappointed at the poor attendance at his exhibitions and reflected on how to generate public interest:

"I organised an exhibition in Khartoum of still-lifes, portraits and nudes. People came to the opening just for the soft drinks. After that, no one came. [It was] as though it hadn't happened. I was completely stuck for two years. I kept asking myself why people couldn't accept and enjoy what I had done. [After reflecting on what would allow his work to resonate with people], I started to write small Arabic inscriptions in the corners of my paintings, almost like postage stamps, and people started to come towards me. I spread the words over the canvas, and they came a bit closer. Then I began to break down the letters to find what gave them meaning, and a Pandora's box opened. Animal forms, human forms and plant forms began to emerge from these once-abstract symbols. That was when I really started working. Images just came, as though I was doing it with a spirit I didn't know I had."

Even at more than 90 years of age, El-Salahi continued his artistic production: As a new form of expression, he created tree-like sculptures for Regent's Park in London, which are modeled on the haraz trees of his homeland. An exhibition titled "Pain Relief Drawings", which opened in New York in October 2022, featured his experimental drawings on scraps of paper, envelopes, and drug packaging, an activity he used to distract himself from his chronic back pain.

== Recognition and major exhibitions ==
El-Salahi's works have been shown in numerous exhibitions and are represented in collections such as the Tate Modern, the Museum of Modern Art and the Sharjah Art Foundation. In 2001, he was honored with a Prince Claus Award from the Netherlands. In the summer of 2013, a major retrospective exhibition of one hundred works was presented at the Tate Modern gallery, London, - the Tate's first retrospective dedicated to an African artist.

From November 2016 to January 2017, El-Salahi's work was featured prominently in the first comprehensive exhibition dedicated to the Modernist art movement in Sudan, entitled The Khartoum School: The Making of the Modern Art Movement in Sudan (1945 –present) at the Sharjah Art Foundation in the United Arab Emirates.

In 2018, the Ashmolean Museum in his adopted home in Oxford, United Kingdom, presented a solo exhibition of El-Salahi's work. This exhibition allowed the viewers to appreciate early works, as well as some of his more recent works. This exhibition also combined his works with ancient Sudanese objects from the museum's main collection as examples of traditional artworks. One of the key aspects of this exhibition was El-Salahi's use of the Haraz tree. This tree is a native acacia species found commonly in the Nile valley that symbolizes 'the Sudanese character' for the artist. As scholar Salah M. Hassan pointed out: "The 'Trees' series has demonstrated not only El-Salahi's resilience and productivity, it also reveals the artist's ability to reinvent himself while remaining on the forefront of exploration and creativity."

El-Salahi's accomplishments offer profound possibilities for both interrogating and repositioning African modernism in the context of modernity as a universal idea, one in which African history is part and parcel of world history. El-Salahi has been remarkable for his creative and intellectual thought, and his rare body of work, innovative visual vocabulary, and spectacular style have combined to shape African modernism in the visual arts in a powerful way.

— Salah M. Hassan, Ibrahim El-Salahi and the making of African and transnational Modernism,

== Personal life ==
According to an article in the academic journal African Arts, El-Salahi holds a strong faith in Islam and is a member of the Khatmyia Sufi order. He prays five times a day and also before he works on his artwork. Like other Sufis, El-Salahi views prayer as a way to establish a connection between the creator and the created.

Ibrahim was married to Katherine El-Salahi.

== See also ==
- Arabic calligraphy
- Hurufiyya art movement
- Visual arts of Sudan
- Hassan Musa
