= List of diplomatic missions of Sudan =

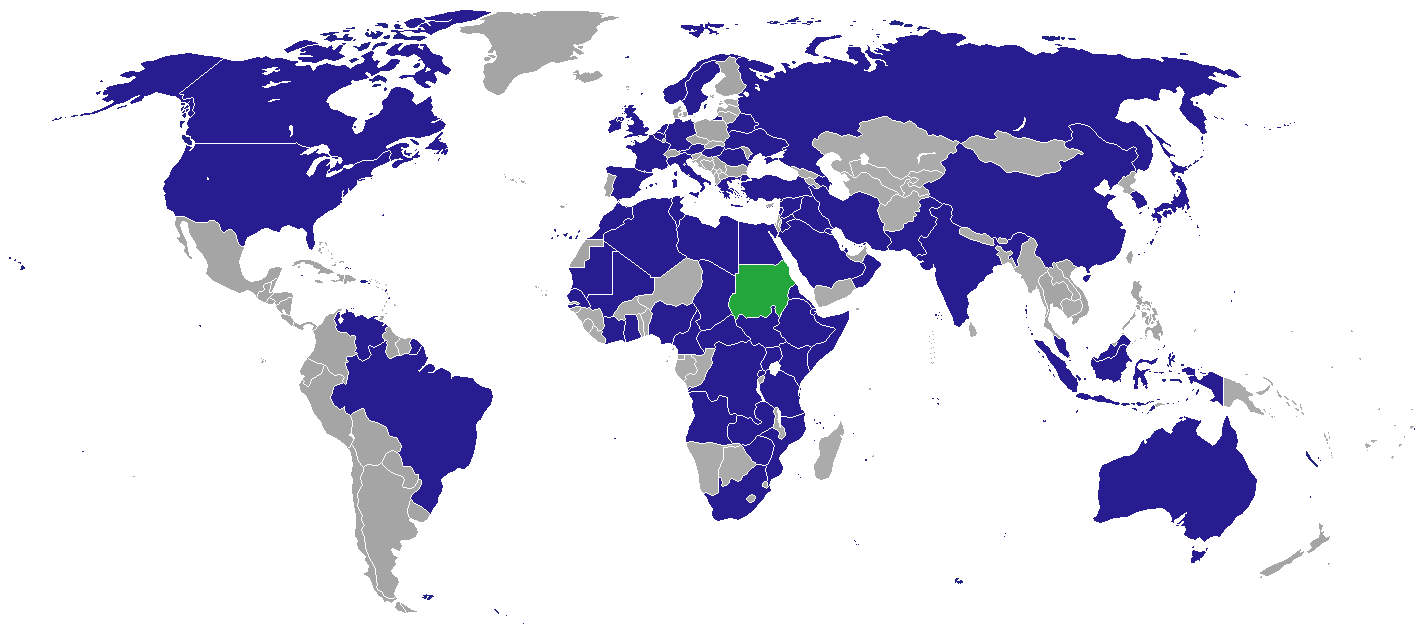
Map of diplomatic missions of Sudan

This is a list of diplomatic missions of Sudan, excluding honorary consulates.

== Current missions ==
=== Africa ===
- Algeria
  - Algiers (Embassy)
- Angola
  - Luanda (Embassy)
- Central African Republic
  - Bangui (Embassy)
- Chad
  - N'Djamena (Embassy)
- Congo-Kinshasa
  - Kinshasa (Embassy)
- Djibouti
  - Djibouti City (Embassy)
- Egypt
  - Cairo (Embassy)
  - Aswan (Consulate-General)
- Eritrea
  - Asmara (Embassy)
- Ethiopia
  - Addis Ababa (Embassy)
- Ghana
  - Accra (Embassy)
- Ivory Coast
  - Abidjan (Embassy)
- Kenya
  - Nairobi (Embassy)
- Libya
  - Tripoli (Embassy)
  - Benghazi (Consulate-General)
  - Kufra (Consulate-General)
- Mali
  - Bamako (Embassy)
- Mauritania
  - Nouakchott (Embassy)
- Morocco
  - Rabat (Embassy)
- Nigeria
  - Abuja (Embassy)
- Rwanda
  - Kigali (Embassy)
- Senegal
  - Dakar (Embassy)
- Somalia
  - Mogadishu (Embassy)
- South Africa
  - Pretoria (Embassy) (Note: Also accredited to Mauritius.)
- South Sudan
  - Juba (Embassy)
- Tanzania
  - Dar es Salaam (Embassy)
- Tunisia
  - Tunis (Embassy)
- Uganda
  - Kampala (Embassy)
  - Gulu (Consulate-General)
- Zambia
  - Lusaka (Embassy)
- Zimbabwe
  - Harare (Embassy)

=== Americas ===
- Brazil
  - Brasília (Embassy) (Note: Also accredited to Chile, Paraguay, & Peru.)
- Canada
  - Ottawa (Embassy)
- United States
  - Washington, D.C. (Embassy)
  - New York City (Consulate-General)
- Venezuela
  - Caracas (Embassy) (Note: Also accredited to Cuba & Ecuador.)

=== Asia ===
- Azerbaijan
  - Baku (Embassy)
- Bahrain
  - Manama (Embassy)
- China
  - Beijing (Embassy)
- India
  - New Delhi (Embassy) (Note: Also accredited to Maldives, Nepal, & Sri Lanka.)
- Indonesia
  - Jakarta (Embassy) (Note: Also accredited to Singapore & Association of Southeast Asian Nations.)
- Iran
  - Tehran (Embassy)
- Iraq
  - Baghdad (Embassy)
- Japan
  - Tokyo (Embassy)
- Jordan
  - Amman (Embassy)
- Kuwait
  - Kuwait City (Embassy)
- Lebanon
  - Beirut (Embassy)
- Malaysia
  - Ampang (Embassy) (Note: Also accredited to Brunei, Philippines, & Thailand.)
- Oman
  - Muscat (Embassy)
- Pakistan
  - Islamabad (Embassy)
- Qatar
  - Doha (Embassy)
- Saudi Arabia
  - Riyadh (Embassy)
  - Jeddah (Consulate-General)
- South Korea
  - Seoul (Embassy)
- Syria
  - Damascus (Embassy)
- Turkey
  - Ankara (Embassy)) (Note: Also accredited to Bosnia and Herzegovina & Georgia.)
  - Istanbul (Consulate-General)

=== Europe ===
- Austria
  - Vienna (Embassy) (Note: Also accredited to Slovakia, Slovenia, United Nations, & International Anti-Corruption Academy.)
- Belarus
  - Minsk (Embassy)
- Belgium
  - Brussels (Embassy) (Note: Also accredited to Luxembourg & European Union.)
- France
  - Paris (Embassy) (Note: Also accredited to Bulgaria, Holy See, & Monaco.)
- Germany
  - Berlin (Embassy)
- Greece
  - Athens (Embassy)
- Hungary
  - Budapest (Embassy) (Note: Also accredited to Croatia.)
- Ireland
  - Dublin (Embassy)
- Italy
  - Rome (Embassy)
- Netherlands
  - The Hague (Embassy) (Note: Also accredited to Organisation for the Prohibition of Chemical Weapons.)
- Norway
  - Oslo (Embassy) (Note: Also accredited to Denmark & Iceland.)
- Romania
  - Bucharest (Embassy) (Note: Also accredited to Moldova & Serbia.)
- Russia
  - Moscow (Embassy)
- Spain
  - Madrid (Embassy)
- Sweden
  - Stockholm (Embassy) (Note: Also accredited to Finland, Latvia, & Lithuania.)
- Ukraine
  - Kyiv (Embassy)
- United Kingdom
  - London (Embassy)

=== Oceania ===
- Australia
  - Canberra (Embassy)

=== Multilateral organisations ===
- African Union
  - Addis Ababa (Permanent Mission)
- United Nations
  - Geneva (Permanent Mission) (Note: Also accredited to Switzerland & Liechtenstein.)
  - New York City (Permanent Mission)
- UNESCO
  - Paris (Permanent Mission)

== Gallery ==
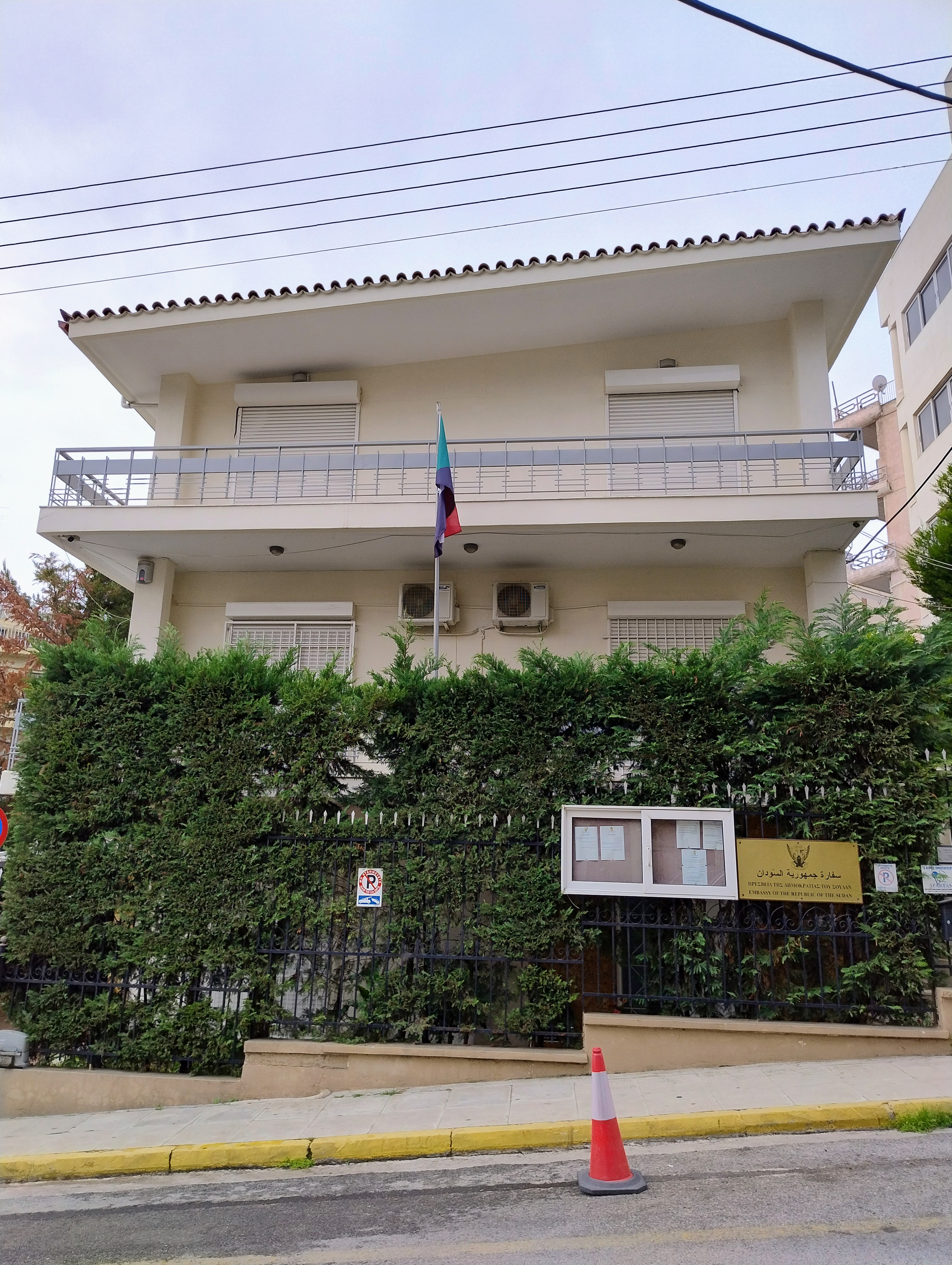
Embassy in Athens

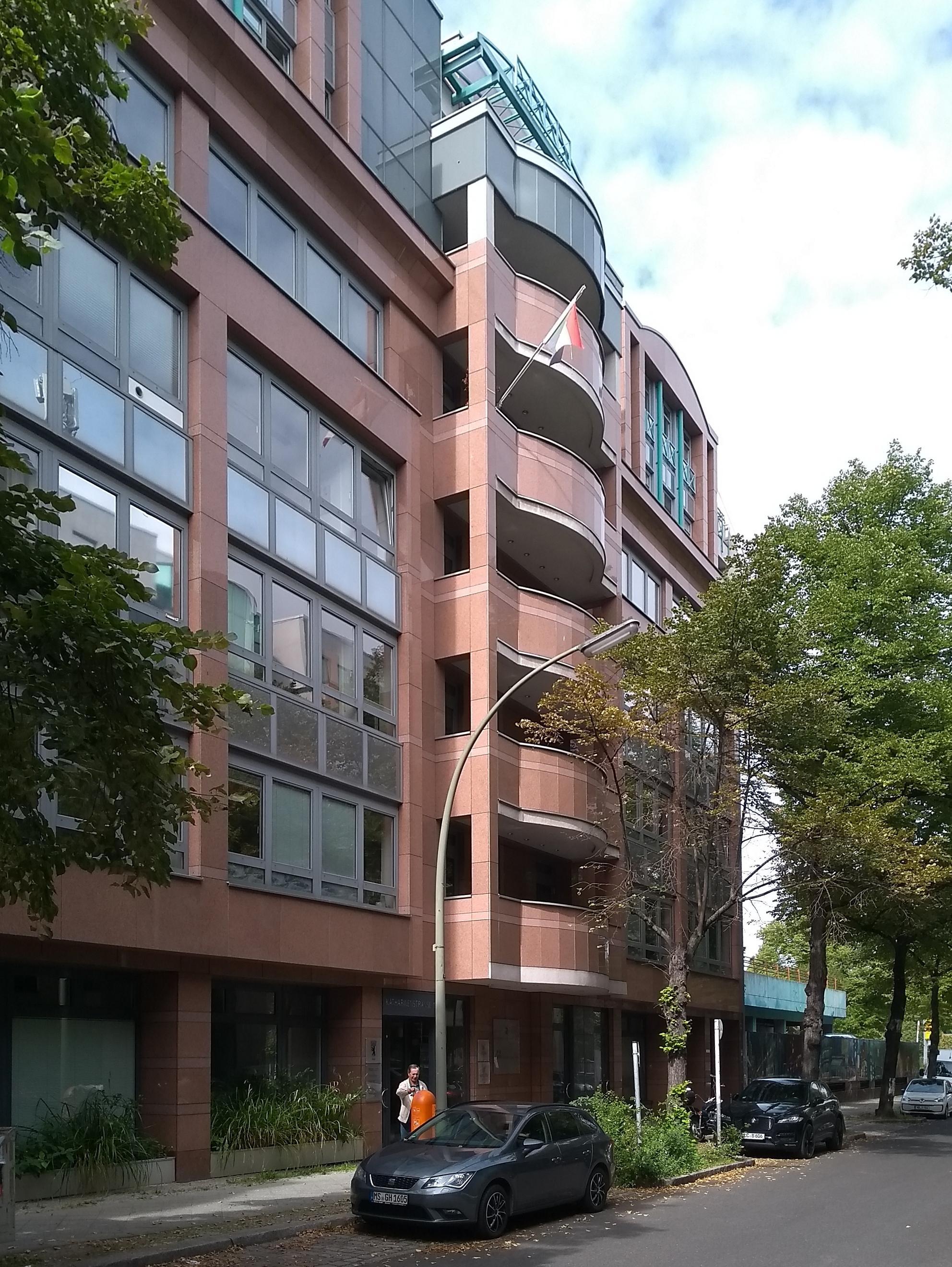
Embassy in Berlin

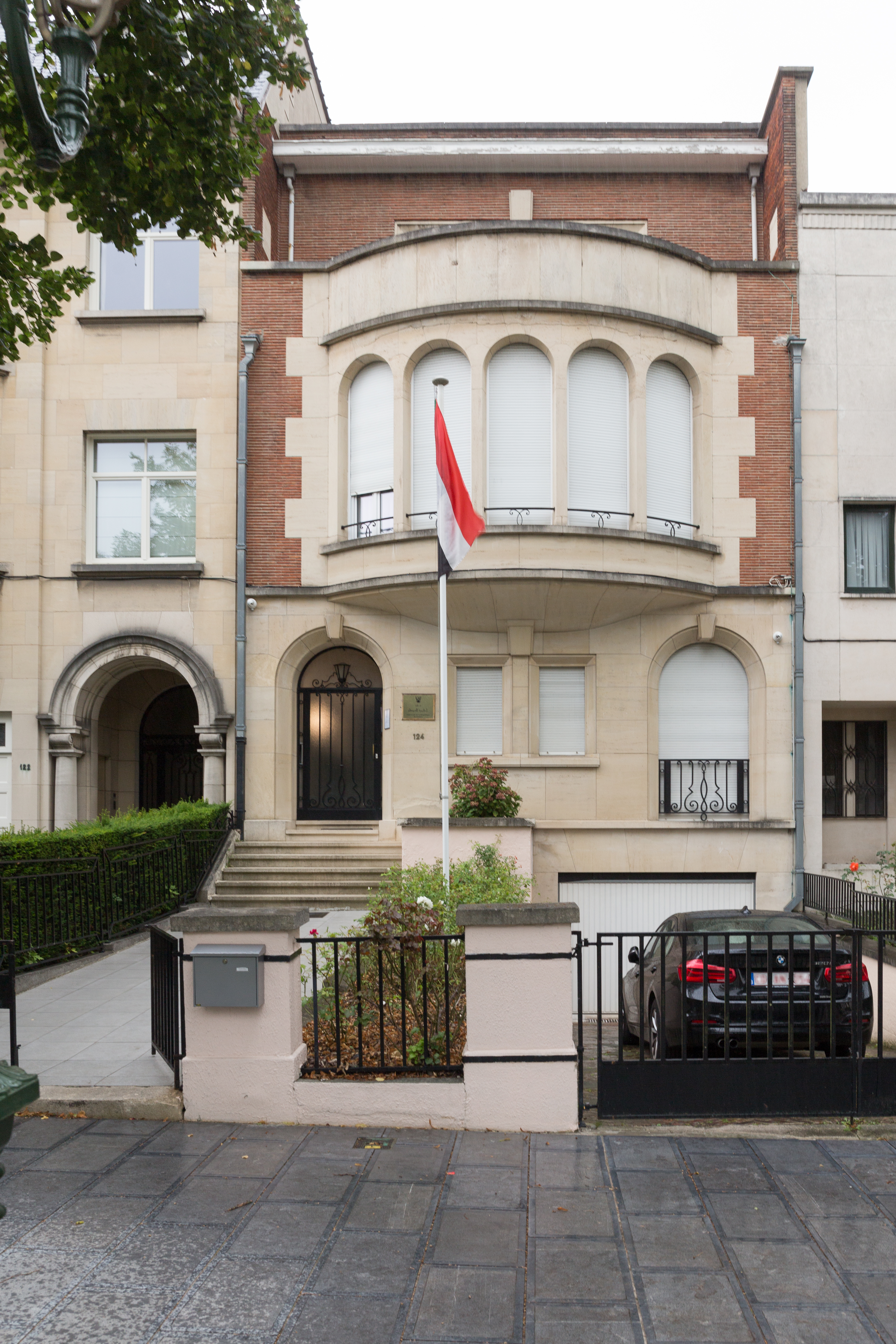
Embassy in Brussels

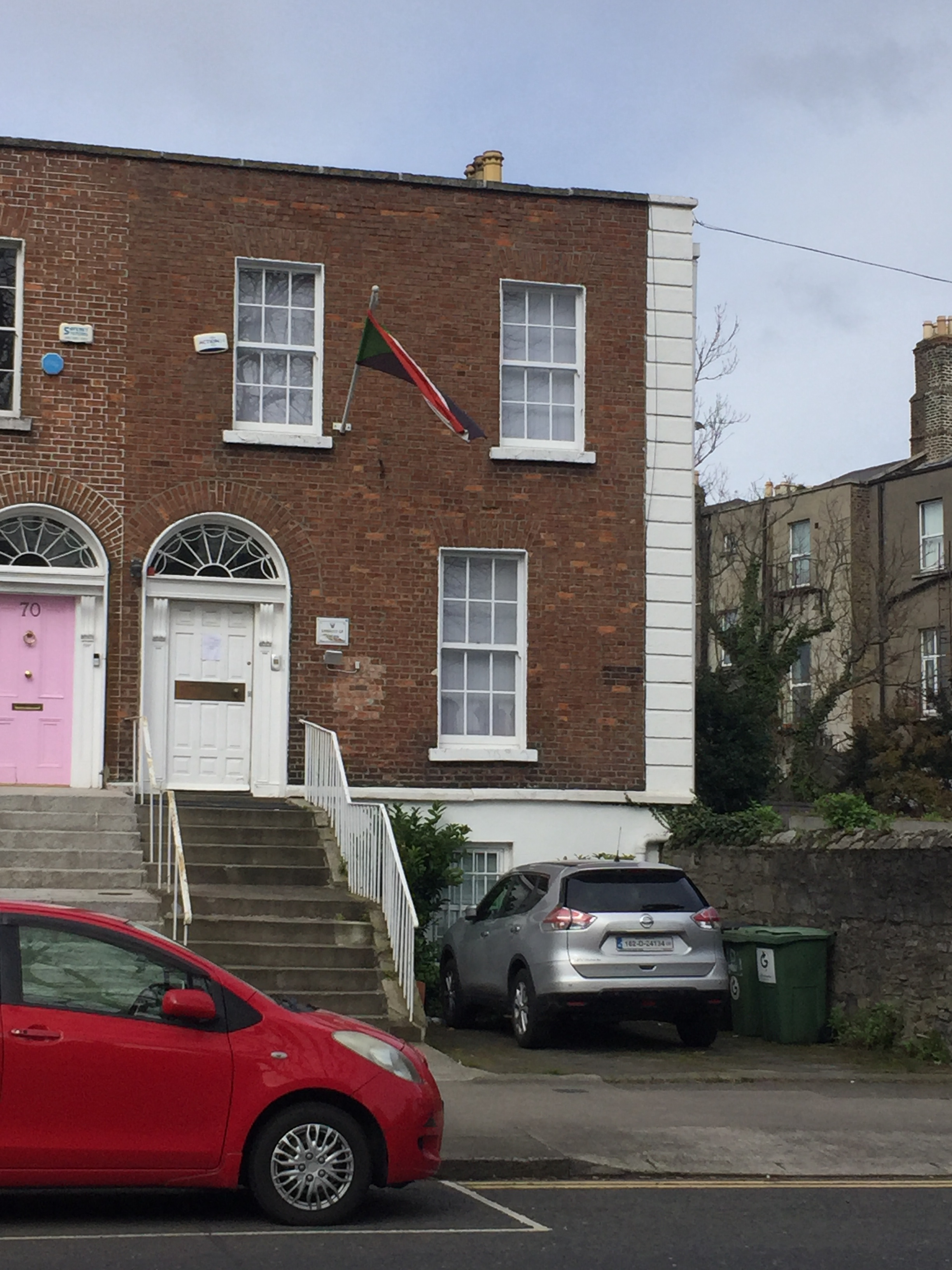
Embassy in Dublin

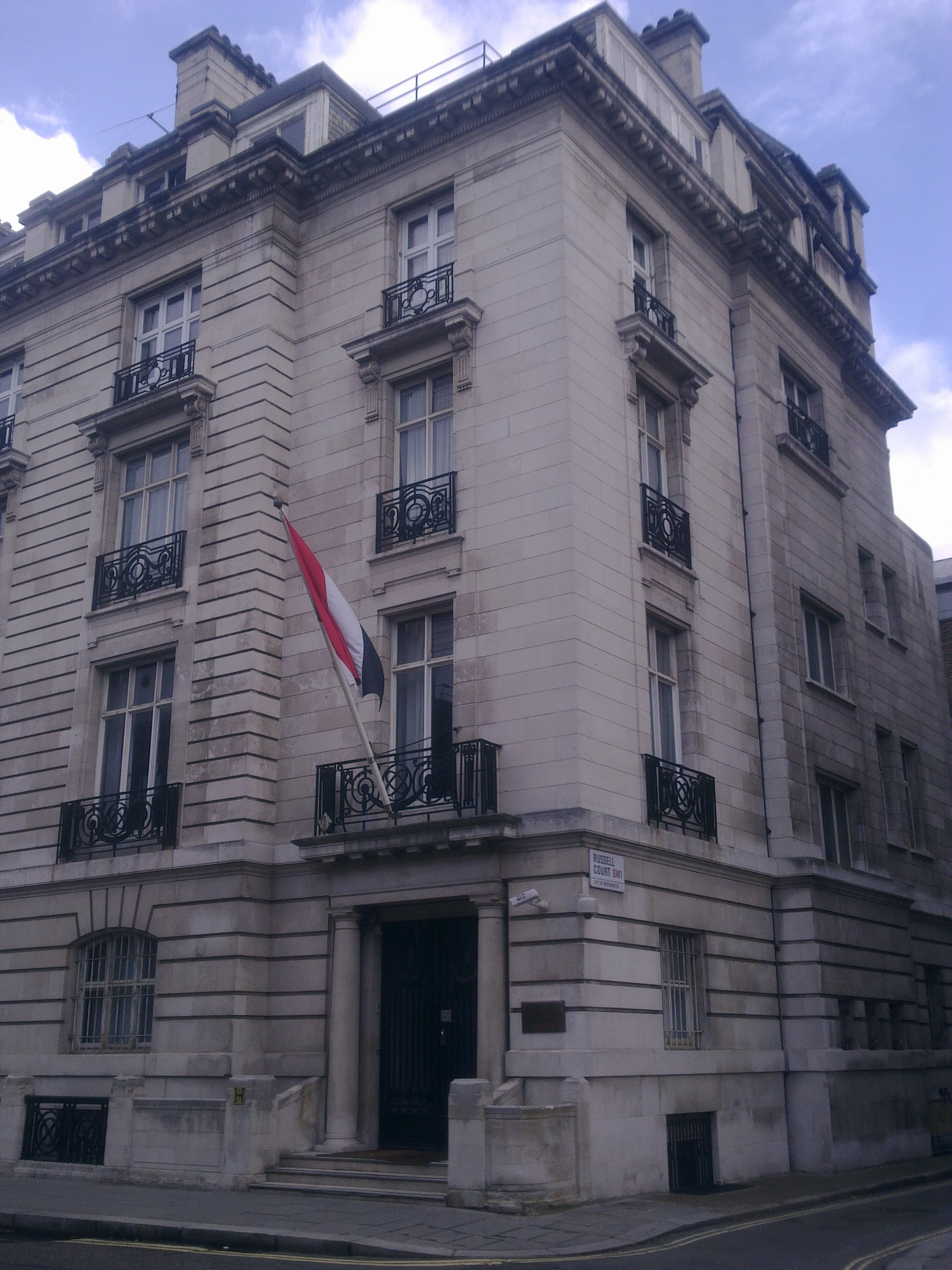
Embassy in London

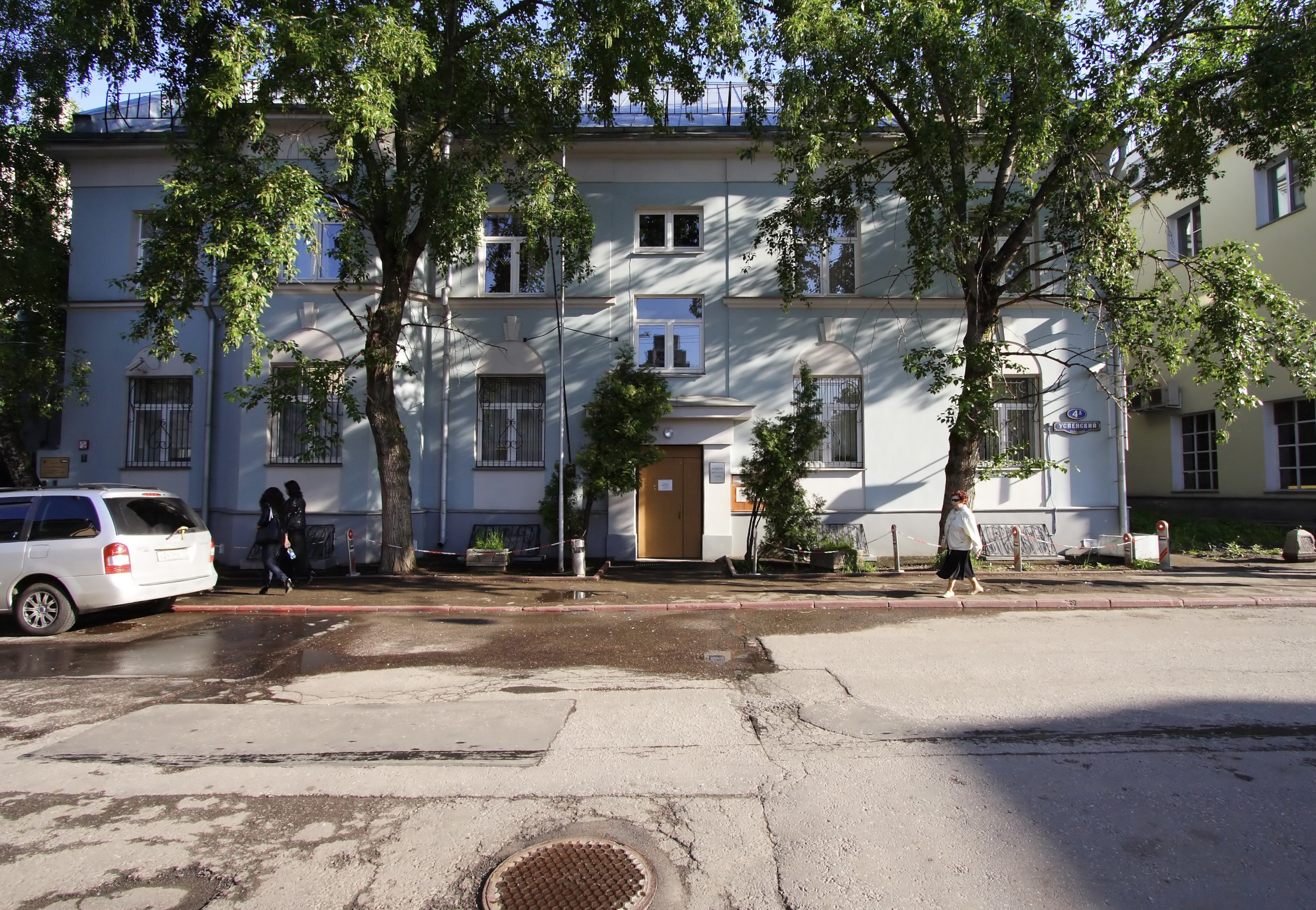
Embassy in Moscow

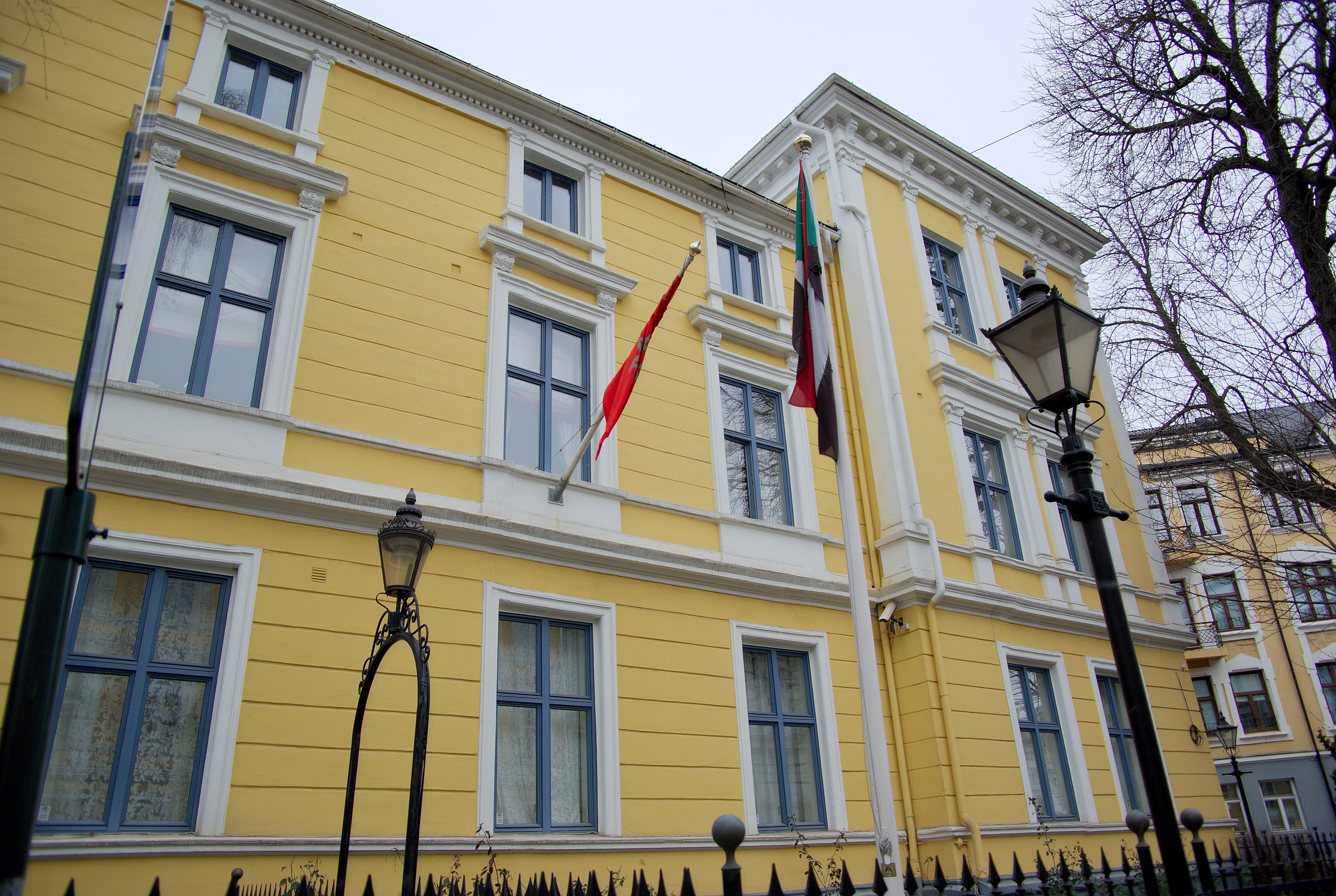
Embassy in Oslo

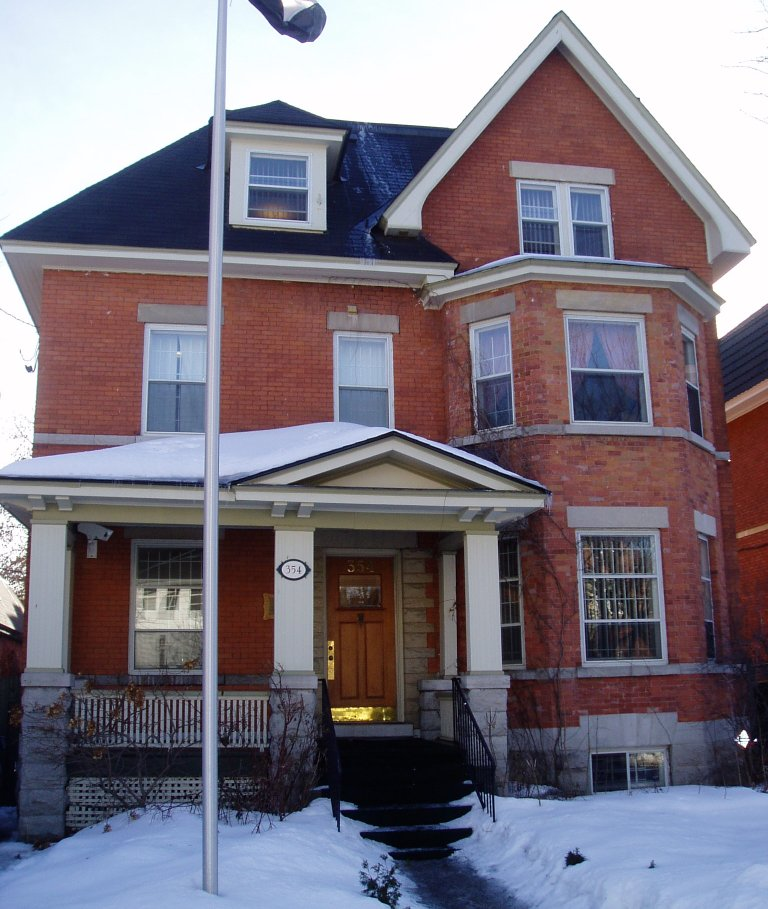
Embassy in Ottawa

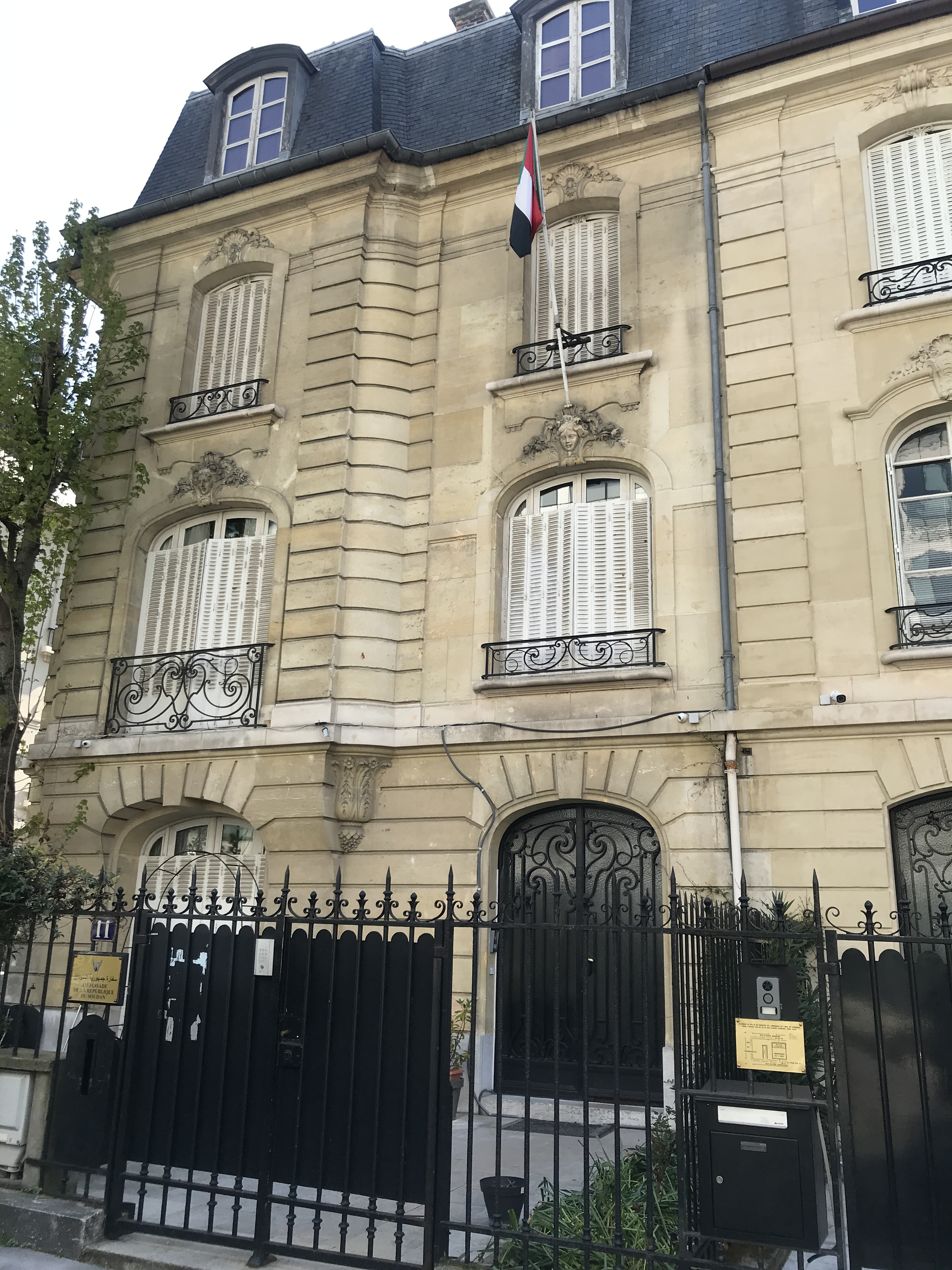
Embassy in Paris

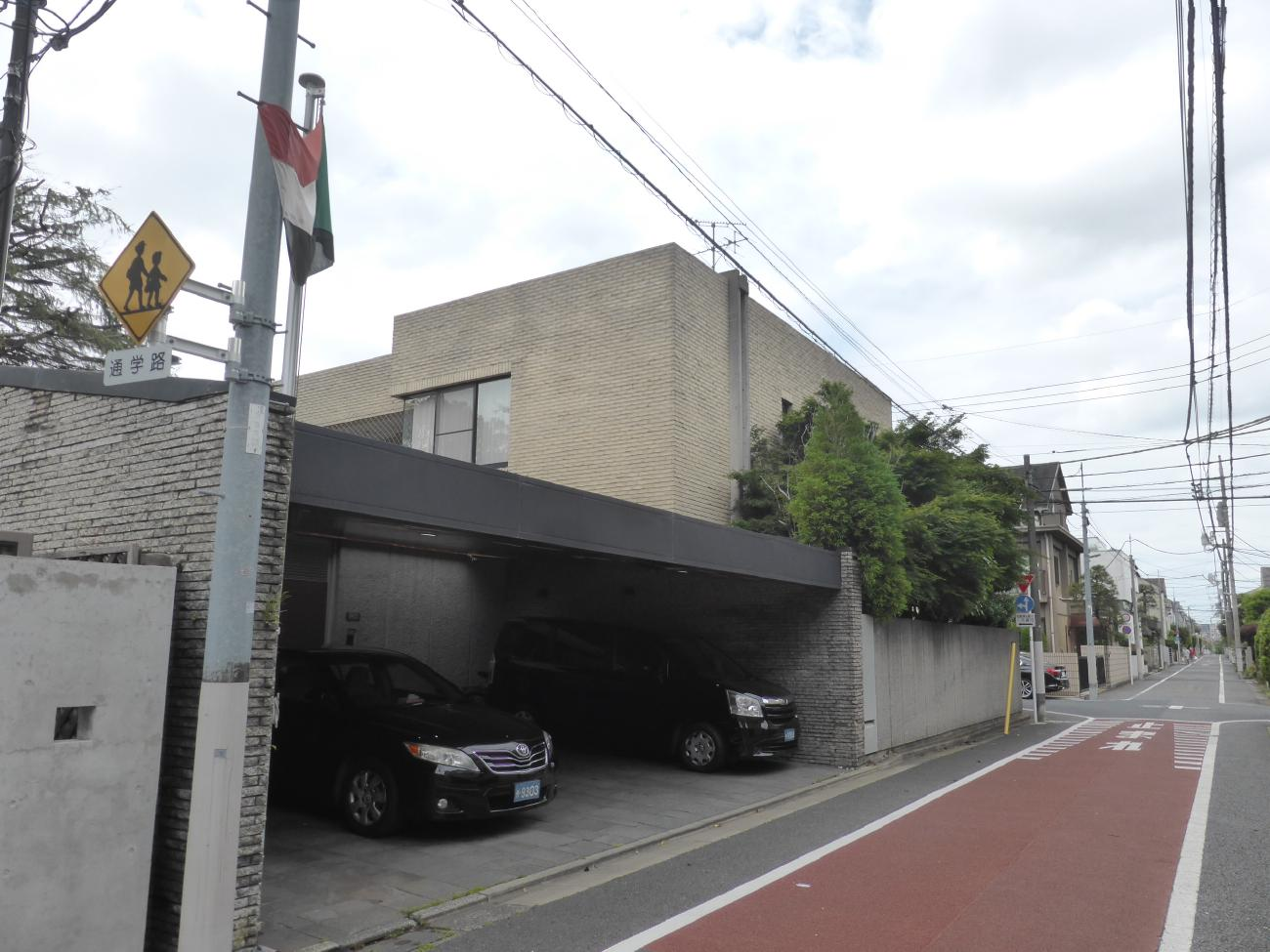
Embassy in Tokyo

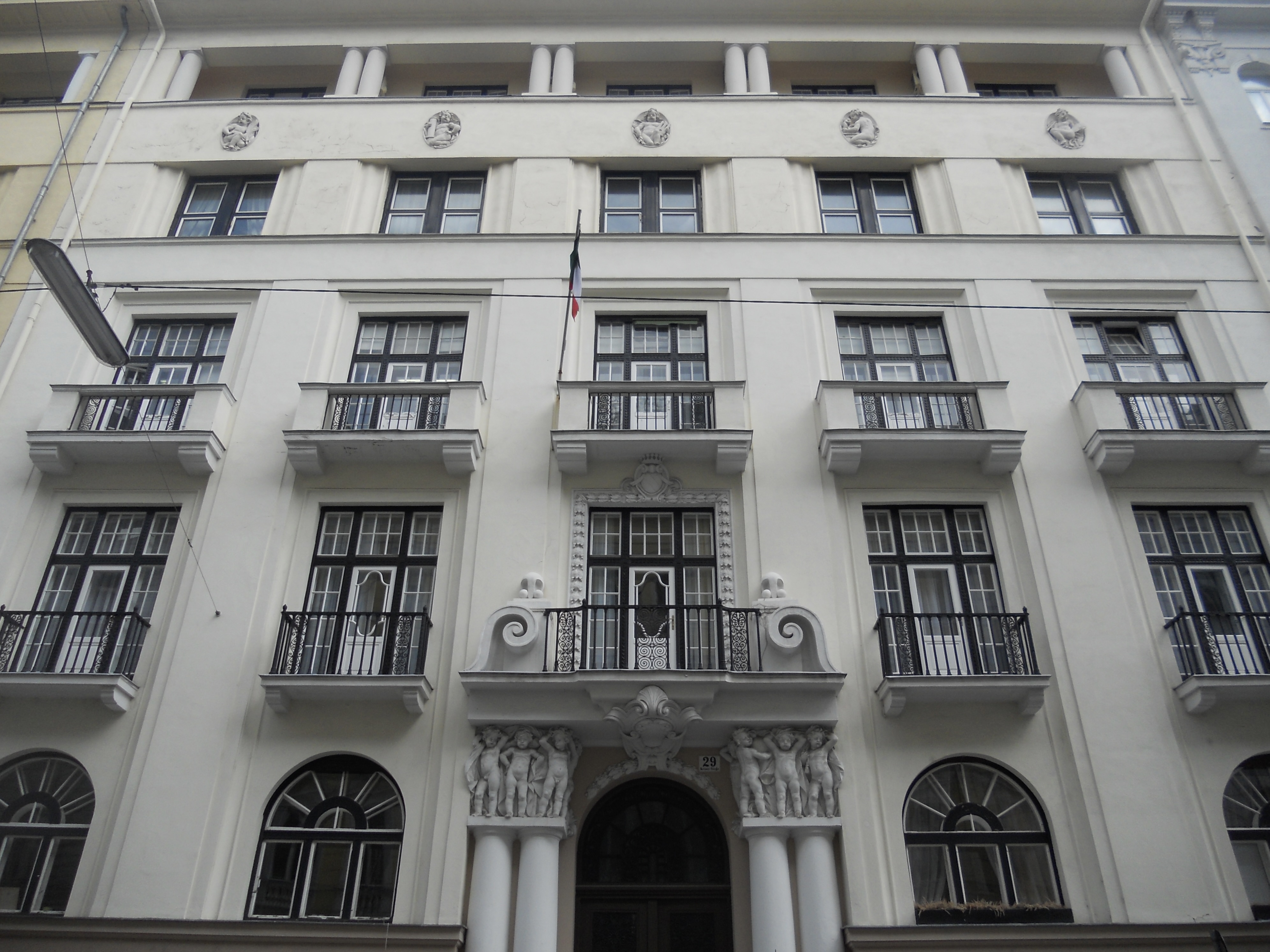
Embassy in Vienna

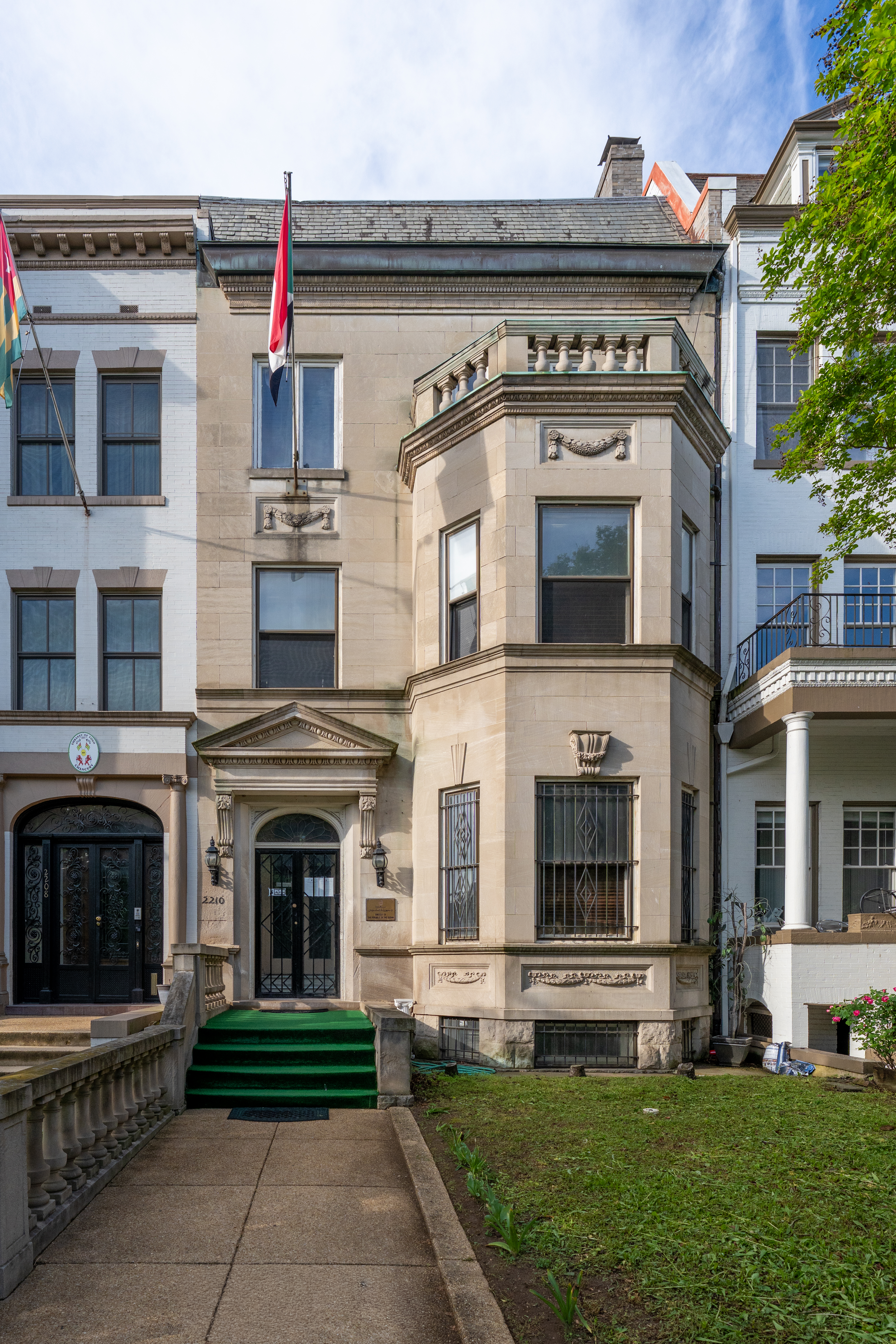
Embassy in Washington, D.C.

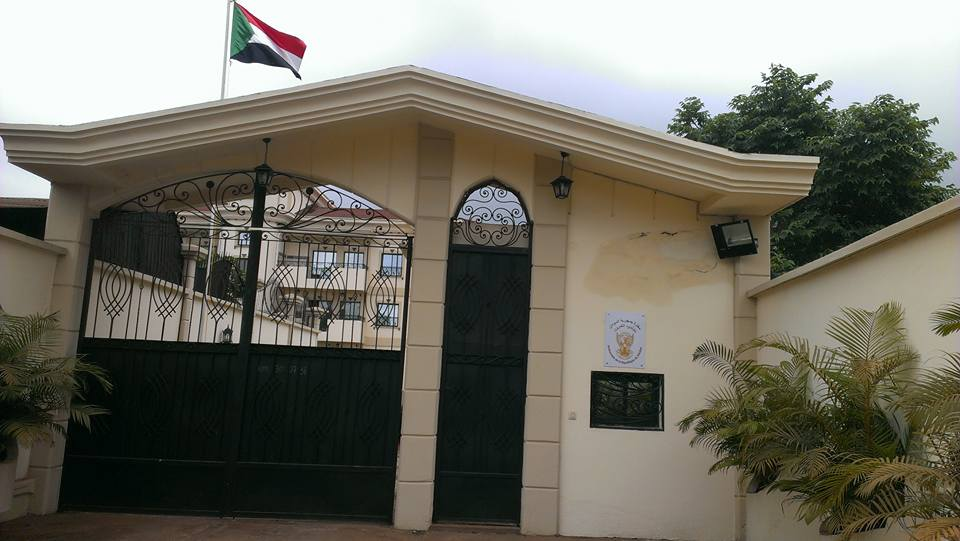
Embassy in Yaoundé

== Closed missions ==
=== Africa ===
Host country	Host city	Mission	Year closed	Ref.
Burkina Faso	Ouagadougou	Embassy	2021	
Cameroon	Yaoundé	Embassy	2021	
Chad	Abéché	Consulate-General	2026	
Comoros	Moroni	Embassy	2021	
Mozambique	Maputo	Embassy	2021	

=== Asia ===
Host country	Host city	Mission	Year closed	Ref.
Thailand	Bangkok	Embassy	2021	
United Arab Emirates	Abu Dhabi	Embassy	2025	
United Arab Emirates	Dubai	Consulate-General	2025	
Vietnam	Hanoi	Embassy	2018	

=== Europe ===
Host country	Host city	Mission	Year closed	Ref.
Bulgaria	Sofia	Embassy	2018	
Czechia	Prague	Embassy	2018	

== See also ==
- Foreign relations of Sudan
- List of diplomatic missions in Sudan
- Visa policy of Sudan
