= College of Fine and Applied Art (Khartoum) =

Public art school in Sudan

The College of Fine and Applied Art in Khartoum is the only public art school in Sudan. Its predecessor was founded by the British administration in 1945 as School of Design in the former Gordon Memorial College (later the University of Khartoum). In 1951, it was incorporated into the Khartoum Technical Institute that became the Sudan University of Science and Technology (SUST) in 1971, and the school was renamed College of Fine and Applied Art.

Some of the notable Sudanese artists who studied or taught at the college are Kamala Ibrahim Ishaq, Ibrahim El-Salahi and Ahmed Shibrain, also known internationally as members of the Khartoum School of Modernist art. Despite considerable setbacks caused mainly by the neglect of several governments since the late 1980s, the art school continues into the 21st century and is the place where many of Sudan's modern visual artists have started their artistic education. After the Sudanese Revolution of 2018/19, the college reformed its curriculum and teaching staff, and is contributing to social and political expressions of the country's artistic movements.

== History ==
=== During colonial times ===
To train art teachers for British-administered public schools of the Anglo-Egyptian Sudan, a Department of Arts was introduced in 1930 in the Bakhtalruda Teachers Institute. This was incorporated in the Institute of Education of the former Gordon Memorial College in 1943, and in 1945, a School of Design was established. Jean-Pierre Greenlaw, a British art teacher, became the first director of this school and became an influential figure in the country's artistic scene. In 1951, the school was moved to the Khartoum Technical Institute, and in 1971, it became the College of Fine and Applied Art in the Sudan University of Science and Technology (SUST).

From the beginning, the school was set up in the tradition of British art schools, offering courses in theoretical and applied arts in carpentry, architecture, painting, geometry and design. Its aim was to produce teachers for secondary schools and vocational training. From 1963 to 1977, professors and teachers from the Royal College of Arts, the Central School of Art and Design and the Slade School of Fine Art in the United Kingdom served as members of the evaluation committees and external examiners. Until the 1970s, the curriculum comprised classes in western techniques with little interest in indigenous culture: Neither the ancient traditions of visual arts in Sudan nor African or Islamic art were taught.

=== After independence ===
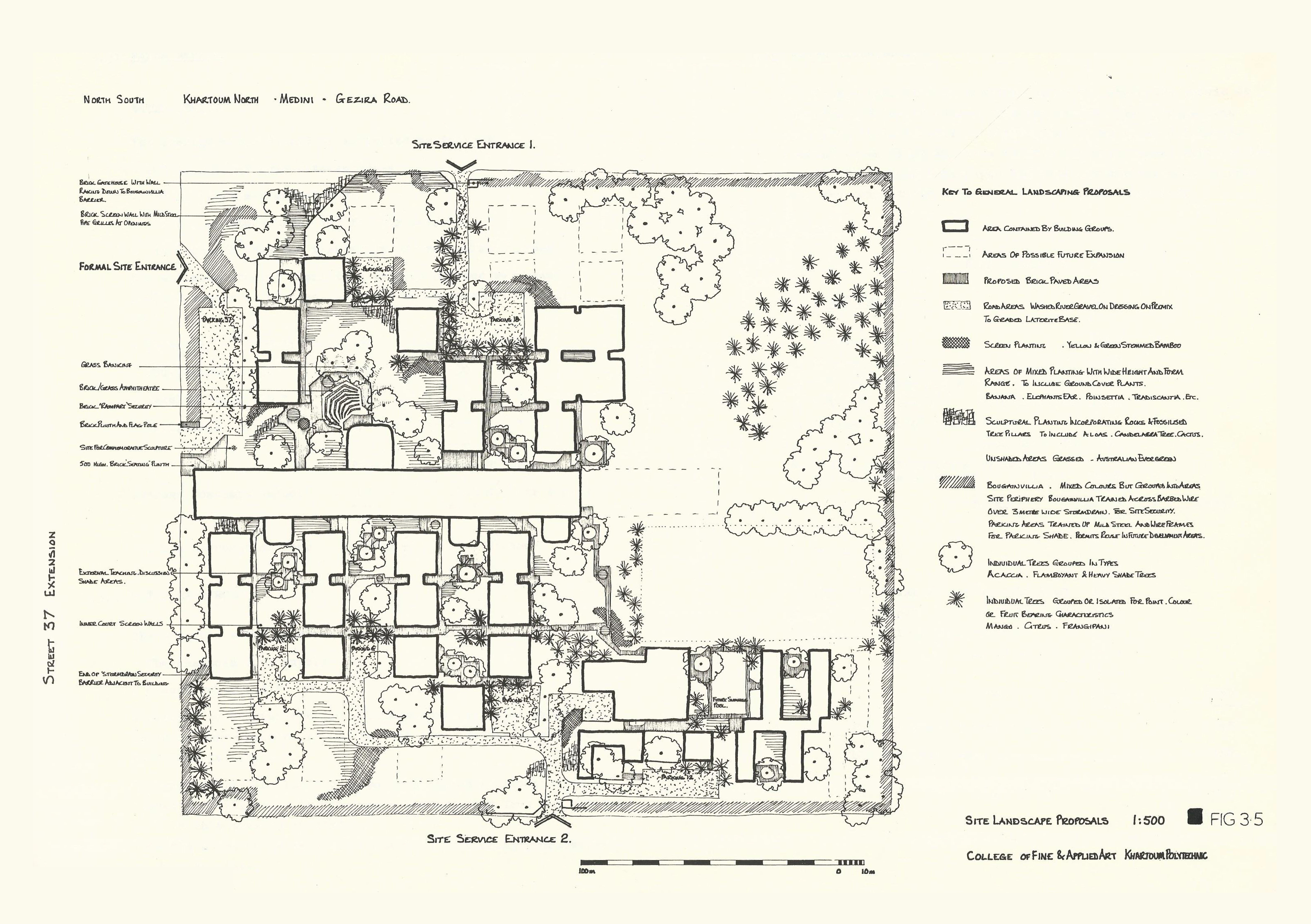
College of Fine and Applied Art Khartoum, designed by Abdel-Moneim Mustafa Ayoub and Omer Salim 1978

After the country's independence in 1956, the first Sudanese artists trained at the school continued their studies in the United Kingdom, with some of them later becoming teachers at the college. After the School of Design had opened in 1945 and up to the 1970s, an early generation of visual artists emerged, who incorporated both African and Islamic art traditions as well as inspiration by western modern art movements, trying to find their own Sudanese visual identity.

In the 1960s, calligrapher Osman Waqialla started an artistic movement later known as the Khartoum School of Modernist art, with Ibrahim El-Salahi, Ahmed Shibrain and Kamala Ibrahim Ishaq becoming internationally known Sudanese artists. Among other notable Sudanese artists who studied or taught at the college are Hassan Musa, Muhammad Omer Khalil, Musa Khalifa, Mo Abarro and Rashid Diab.

In 1978, a modern complex for the college was designed by Sudanese architects Abdel Moneim Mustafa Ayoub and Omer Salim. It was constructed for approximately 600 students, with spaces for teaching, practical classes, administrative, social and residential facilities, with surrounding open spaces for exhibitions and recreational use.

Following the military governments under Omar al-Bashir and their Islamist orientation, artists and artistic scenes suffered from a 30-year long period of very difficult political and economic constraints. Among other factors, this was marked by many artists leaving the country, US-imposed sanctions, and the closing of many western embassies in the 1990s. The college budget and conditions for appointing teachers and training students severely suffered during this period, with standards of teachers' qualification and for admission of new students falling. Even though the college continued to exist, many young Sudanese artists had to develop their art in a socially restricted environment and were practically cut off from artistic innovation in the rest of the world.

=== 21st century ===
In the 21st century, the college is still suffering from inadequate budgets and a shortage of teaching materials and staff. Responding to contemporary developments and needs of the society, it strives to embed its teaching of modern art and design technologies in programmes of sustainable development. This includes artistic training for documenting and reflecting social issues such as public health. It also sees itself as a regional resource centre for Afro-Arab arts. The different undergraduate courses offer specializations in painting, sculpture, graphic design, calligraphy, drawing, ceramic, textile, interior and industrial design as well as in printing and book binding.

As Sudanese academic Ahmad Sikainga wrote in 2012, modern art movements in Sudan and their social background have not attracted much analysis by art historians. During the Sudanese Revolution of 2018/19, however, the role of artists has been reported more often in international media. Before, during and after the revolution, artists have creatively expressed their views on society and politics, while this expression had been severely limited by the former government of Omar al Bashir.

As an expression of their participation in the ongoing protests against the military government since 2019, students of the college exhibited a memorial sculpture representing the slogans Freedom, Peace and Justice. In September 2021, the Documentation Centre of the college completed a training course for visual documentation in cooperation with the Sudan Memory programme and the British Museum. During the closing ceremony, professor Omer Mohamed Elhassan Darma paid tribute to the fighters and martyrs of the December revolution and said, "the students of the College of Fine and Applied Art played important roles through murals and wall drawings that reflected stories and details of the struggle of revolutionists".

== See also ==
- Visual arts of Sudan
- Architecture of Sudan
