= Babiker al-Nur Osman =

Sudanese military officer and politician involved in the 1971 Sudanese coup

- بابكر النور عثمان
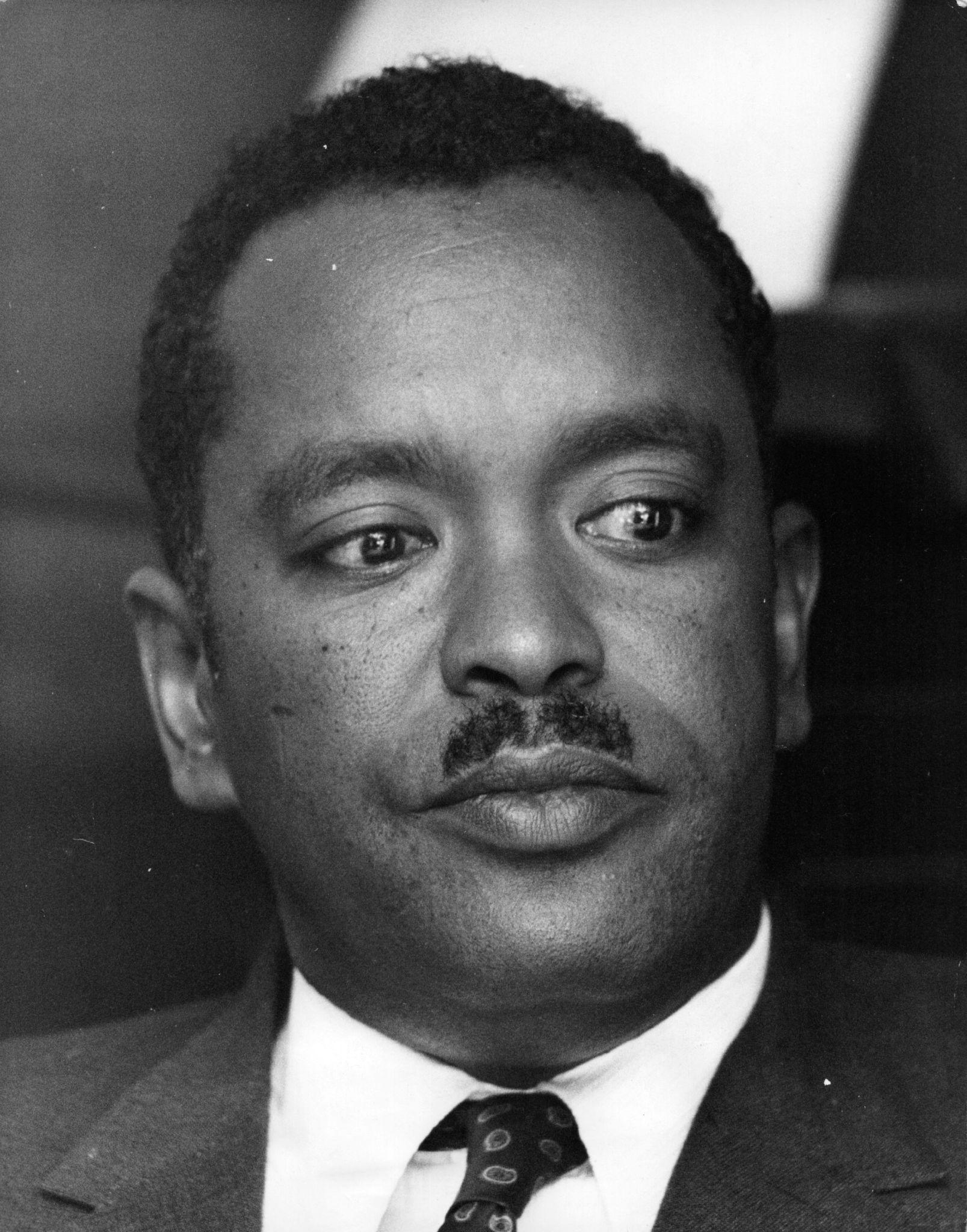

President of the Revolutionary Council of Sudan
- In office 19 July 1971 – 22 July 1971
- Deputy: Hashem al-Atta
- Preceded by: Gaafar Nimeiry (as Chairman of the NRCC)
- Succeeded by: Gaafar Nimeiry (as Chairman of the NRCC)

Personal details
- Born: 1935 Sudan
- Died: 26 July 1971 (aged 35–36) Khartoum, Sudan
- Cause of death: Execution by firing squad
- Other political affiliations: July Rectification Movement
- Occupation: Military officer, politician

Military service
- Allegiance: Sudan
- Branch/service: Sudanese Army
- Rank: Lieutenant colonel
- Commands: Sudanese Armed Forces
- Battles/wars: First Sudanese Civil War

Babiker al-Nur Osman (Arabic: بابكر النور عثمان; 1935 – 26 July 1971), also transliterated as Babikir al-Nur, was a Sudanese military officer and politician associated with the Sudanese Communist Party and the Free Officers Movement. He was a member of the Revolutionary Command Council established after the 1969 coup d'état and later became one of the principal figures in the short-lived 1971 coup d'état against President Gaafar Nimeiry.

During the July 1971 coup, al-Nur was designated President of a new Revolutionary Council and was therefore nominally Sudan's head of state between 19 and 22 July. He was, however, in London when the coup occurred and never reached Khartoum to assume effective control. Hashem al-Atta, who led the military operation in Sudan, exercised authority in his absence.

While traveling from London to Khartoum on 22 July 1971, al-Nur and fellow coup leader Farouk Osman Hamadallah were removed from a scheduled BOAC flight after Libyan authorities forced the aircraft to land at Benina Airport, near Benghazi. They were subsequently returned to Sudan after Nimeiry regained power. Al-Nur was tried by a military tribunal and executed by firing squad later that month.

== Early life and military career ==
Al-Nur was born in 1935. Political scientist Dunstan M. Wai identified him with the Omdurman–Buri milieu from which several members of the military group that came to power in 1969 originated.

By the late 1960s, al-Nur was a lieutenant colonel in the Sudanese Army and a member of the Free Officers movement. Historian Tim Niblock describes him as the most senior military officer closely associated with the Sudanese Communist Party at the time of the May 1969 seizure of power.

== May 1969 coup and Revolutionary Command Council ==
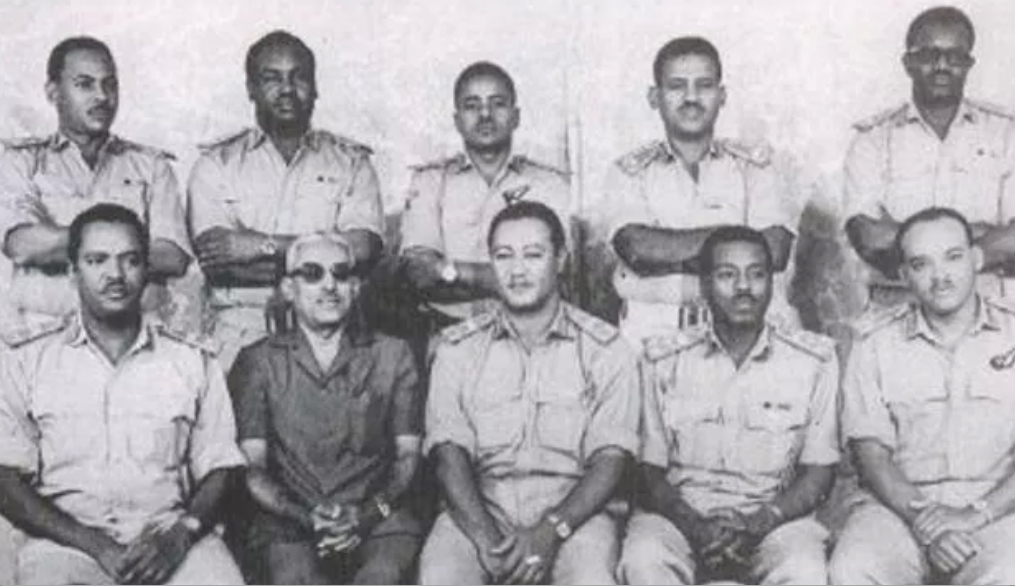
National Revolutionary Command Council following the coup in 1969.

On 25 May 1969, officers led by Colonel Gaafar Nimeiry overthrew Sudan's civilian government and established the Revolutionary Command Council (RCC). The coup inaugurated what became known as the May regime. Al-Nur had reportedly opposed carrying out the coup at that particular time during earlier discussions among the Free Officers. After the coup succeeded, however, Nimeiry brought al-Nur into the RCC.

The RCC initially included Nimeiry, al-Nur, Hashem al-Atta, Farouk Osman Hamadallah, Khalid Hassan Abbas, Abu al-Qasim Muhammad Ibrahim and several other officers, as well as civilian politician Babiker Awadalla.

Relations between Nimeiry and the Sudanese Communist Party subsequently deteriorated. The Communist Party itself was divided over its attitude towards the new military government, with one faction advocating cooperation with the regime and another, associated with party secretary-general Abdel Khaliq Mahjub, maintaining greater organisational and political independence.

In November 1970, Nimeiry removed al-Nur, al-Atta and Hamadallah from the Revolutionary Command Council as the confrontation between the government and the Communist-aligned wing of the military intensified.

== 1971 coup d'état ==
On 19 July 1971, military officers led by Major Hashem al-Atta seized strategic positions in Khartoum, arrested Nimeiry and announced the overthrow of his government. Al-Nur and Hamadallah were in London when the coup began. However, the coup leaders announced a new Revolutionary Council with al-Nur as its president. Following his designation as president of the Revolutionary Council, al-Nur attempted to return to Sudan from London together with Hamadallah.

=== Arrest ===
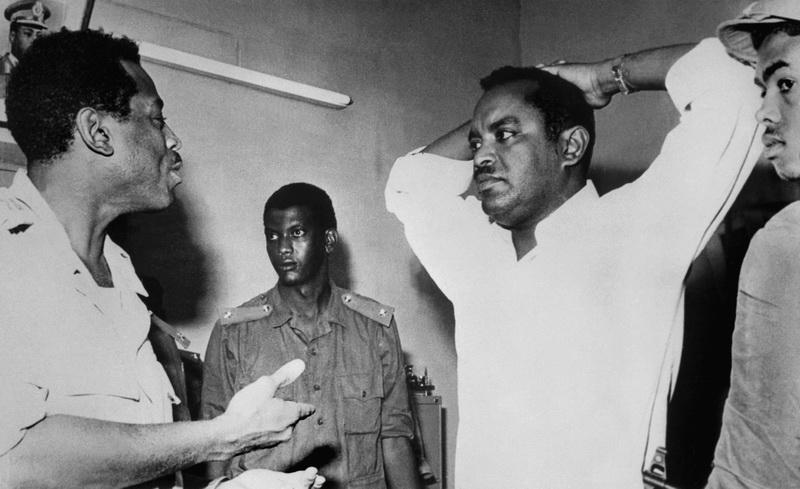
al-Nur being interrogated by Defense Minister Khalid Hassan Abbas following his extradition from Libya and the collapse of the coup.

In the early hours of 22 July, they boarded a scheduled BOAC VC10 flight from London to Khartoum. While the aircraft was travelling through Libyan airspace, air traffic controllers in Benghazi ordered it to land at Benina Airport. According to a statement made that day in the British House of Commons, the pilot initially turned towards Malta, but Libyan authorities threatened to have the aircraft shot down if it did not land.

After the aircraft landed, Libyan security officials demanded that al-Nur and Hamadallah leave the plane. Both initially refused. They eventually left after being told that their refusal placed the other passengers in danger. The aircraft then returned to London with the remaining passengers.

The British government formally protested the action. Minister of State for Foreign and Commonwealth Affairs Joseph Godber told Parliament that the aircraft was operating a normal scheduled service and had the right to overfly Libya, describing the Libyan intervention as a serious violation of international civil aviation practice.

=== Failure of the coup and execution ===
On the same day that al-Nur was detained in Libya, forces loyal to Nimeiry regained control of Khartoum. Nimeiry was released and restored to power on 22 July. Libyan authorities subsequently transferred al-Nur and Hamadallah to Sudan. They were brought before military tribunals established following Nimeiry's restoration. Al-Nur and Hamadallah were sentenced to death for their involvement in the attempted overthrow.

Al-Nur was executed by firing squad on 26 July 1971. Other military officers associated with the coup, including al-Atta and Hamadallah, were also executed. Nimeiry's government then undertook a broad crackdown on the Sudanese Communist Party. Among the civilian Communist leaders executed following the coup were secretary-general Abdel Khaliq Mahjub, trade-union leader Shafi Ahmed el-Sheikh, and former minister Joseph Garang.
