= Democratic Republic of the Sudan =

Northeast African state (1969–1985)

Coordinates: 15°38′N 32°32′E

Democratic Republic of the Sudan (1969–1971) جمهورية السودان الديمُقراطية (Arabic) Jumhūrīyat as-Sūdān ad-Dīmuqrāṭīyah (1969–1971) Democratic Sudan (1971) السودان الديمقراطي (Arabic) as-Sūdān ad-Dīmuqrāṭīyah (1971) Democratic Republic of Sudan (1971–1985) جمهورية السودان الديمُقراطية (Arabic) Jumhūrīyat as-Sūdān ad-Dīmuqrāṭīyah (1971–1985)
- 1969–1985
- Flag (1970–1985) Emblem (1970–1985)
- Motto: النصر لنا an-Naṣr lanā "Victory is ours"
- Anthem: نحن جند الله، جند الوطن; Naḥnu Jund Allah, Jund Al-waṭan "We are Soldiers of God, Soldiers of the Homeland"
- Capital: Khartoum
- Common languages: Arabic; English; Other languages of Sudan
- Religion: Islam; Animism; Christianity
- Government: Unitary one-party socialist republic under a Nasserist military dictatorship
- President
  - 1969–1971: Gaafar Nimeiry
  - 1971: Babikir al-Nur Osman
  - 1971–1985: Gaafar Nimeiry
- First Vice President, Second Vice President and Third Vice President
  - 1969–1971: Babiker Awadalla and Khalid Hassan Abbas
  - 1971–1972: Abel Alier
  - 1972–1976: Mohamed Al-Baghir Ahmed and Abel Alier
  - 1976–1979: Abu el-Qassim Mohamad Ibrahim, Abel Alier and Rashid Bakr
  - 1979–1982: Abdul Majid Hamid Khalil and Abel Alier and Omar Muhammad al-Tayib
  - 1982–1985: Omar Muhammad al-Tayib and Joseph Lagu
- Prime minister
  - 1969: Babiker Awadalla
  - 1969–1971: Gaafar Nimeiry
  - 1971: Vacant
  - 1971–1976: Gaafar Nimeiry
  - 1976–1977: Rashid Bakr
  - 1977–1985: Gaafar Nimeiry
- Legislature: People's Assembly
- Historical era: Cold War; Arab Cold War
  - Coup d'état: 25 May 1969
  - 1971 Sudanese coup d'état attempt fails: 19–23 July 1971
  - 1975 Sudanese coup attempt fails: 5 September 1975
  - 1976 Sudanese coup attempt fails: 2–5 July 1976
  - 1977 Sudan Juba coup attempt fails: 2 February 1977
  - Disestablished though the 1985 Sudanese coup d'état: 6 April 1985

Area
  - Total: 2,530,397 km^{2} (976,992 sq mi) (9th)
- Currency: Sudanese pound
- ISO 3166 code: SD
Preceded by	Succeeded by
Republic of the Sudan (1956–1969)	Republic of the Sudan (1985–2019)
- Today part of: Sudan; South Sudan; Egypt (disputed)

On 25 May 1969, several young officers calling themselves the Free Officers Movement (after the Egyptian officers who instigated the Egyptian revolution of 1952) seized power in Sudan in a coup d'état and started the Nimeiry era, also called the May Regime, in the history of Sudan. Gaafar Nimeiry ruled as president with the Sudanese Socialist Union (SSU). At the conspiracy's core were nine officers led by Colonel Gaafar Nimeiry, who had been implicated in plots against the Abboud regime. Nimeiry's coup preempted plots by other groups, most of which involved army factions supported by the Sudanese Communist Party (SCP), Arab nationalists, or conservative religious groups. He justified the coup on the grounds that civilian politicians had paralyzed the decision-making process, had failed to deal with the country's economic and regional problems, and had left Sudan without a permanent constitution.

== History ==
=== National Revolutionary Command Council ===
The coup leaders, joined by Babiker Awadallah, the former chief justice who had been privy to the coup, constituted themselves as the ten-member National Revolutionary Command Council (NRCC), which possessed collective executive authority under Nimeiri's chairmanship. On assuming control, the NRCC proclaimed the establishment of a "democratic republic" dedicated to advancing independent "Sudanese socialism." The NRCC's first acts included the suspension of the Transitional Constitution, the abolition of all government institutions, and the banning of political parties. The NRCC also nationalized many industries, businesses, and banks. Furthermore, Nimeiri ordered the arrest of sixty-three civilian politicians and forcibly retired senior army officers.

Awadallah – appointed prime minister to form a new government that would implement NRCC policy directives – wanted to dispel the notion that the coup had installed a military dictatorship. He presided over a twenty-one-member cabinet that included only three officers from the NRCC, among them its chairman, Nimeiri, who was also defense minister. The cabinet's other military members held the portfolios for internal security and communications. Nine members of the Awadallah regime were allegedly communists, including one of the two southerners in the cabinet, Joseph Garang, minister of supply and later minister for southern affairs. Others identified themselves as Marxists. Since the NRCC lacked political and administrative experience, the communists played a significant role in shaping government policies and programs. Despite the influence of individual SCP members, the NRCC claimed that its cooperation with the party was a matter of convenience.

In November 1969, after he claimed the regime could not survive without communist assistance, Awadallah lost the prime ministership. Nimeiri, who became head of a largely civilian government in addition to being chief of state, succeeded him. Awadallah retained his position as NRCC deputy chairman and remained in the government as foreign minister and as an important link with leftist elements.

Conservative forces, led by the Ansar, posed the greatest threat to the NRCC. Imam al-Hadi al-Mahdi had withdrawn to his Aba Island stronghold in the Nile, near Khartoum, in the belief that the government had decided to strike at the Ansar movement. The Imam had demanded a return to democratic government, the exclusion of communists from power, and an end to NRCC rule. In March 1970, hostile Ansar crowds prevented Nimeiri from visiting the island for talks with the imam. Fighting subsequently erupted between government forces and as many as 30,000 Ansar. When the Ansar ignored an ultimatum to surrender, army units with air support assaulted Aba Island. Around 3,000 people died during the battle. The Imam escaped only to be killed while attempting to cross the border into Ethiopia. The government exiled al-Hadi al-Mahdi's nephew and former Prime Minister Sadiq al-Mahdi to Egypt, where Nasser promised to keep him under guard to prevent him from succeeding his uncle as head of the Ansar.

After neutralizing this conservative opposition, the NRCC concentrated on consolidating its political organization to phase out communist participation in the government. This strategy prompted an internal debate within the SCP. The orthodox wing, led by party secretary general Abdel Khaliq Mahjub, demanded a popular front government with communists participating as equal partners. The National Communist wing, on the other hand, supported cooperation with the government.

Soon after the army had crushed the Ansar at Aba Island, Nimeiri moved against the SCP. He ordered the deportation of Abdel Khaliq Mahjub. Then, when the SCP secretary general returned to Sudan illegally after several months abroad, Nimeiri placed him under house arrest. In March 1971, Nimeiri indicated that trade unions, a traditional communist stronghold, would be placed under government control. The NRCC also banned communist affiliated student, women's, and professional organizations. Additionally, Nimeiri announced the planned formation of a national political movement called the Sudan Socialist Union (SSU), which would assume control of all political parties, including the SCP. After this speech, the government arrested the SCP's central committee and other leading communists.

The SCP, however, retained a covert organization that was not damaged in the sweep. Before further action could be taken against the party, the SCP launched a coup against Nimeiri. The coup occurred on July 19, 1971, when one of the plotters, Major Hashem al Atta, surprised Nimeiri and the NRCC meeting in the presidential palace and seized them along with a number of pro-Nimeiri officers. Atta named a seven-member revolutionary council, in which communists ranked prominently, to serve as the national government. Three days after the coup, however, loyal army units stormed the palace, rescued Nimeiri, and arrested Atta and his confederates. Nimeiri, who blamed the SCP for the coup, ordered the arrest of hundreds of communists and dissident military officers. The government subsequently executed some of these individuals and imprisoned many others.

Having survived the SCP-inspired coup, Nimeiri reaffirmed his commitment to establishing a socialist state. A provisional constitution, published in August 1971, described Sudan as a "socialist democracy" and provided for a presidential form of government to replace the NRCC. A plebiscite the following month elected Nimeiri to a six-year term as president.

=== The Southern Problem ===
The origins of the civil war in the south date back to the 1950s. On August 18, 1955, the Equatoria Corps, a military unit composed of southerners, mutinied at Torit. Rather than surrender to Sudanese government authorities, many mutineers disappeared into hiding with their weapons, marking the beginning of the first war in southern Sudan. By the late 1960s, the war had resulted in the deaths of about 500,000 people. Several hundred thousand more southerners hid in the forests or escaped to refugee camps in neighboring countries.

By 1969 the rebels had developed foreign contacts to obtain weapons and supplies. Israel, for example, trained Anyanya recruits and shipped weapons via Ethiopia and Uganda to the rebels. The Anyanya also purchased arms from Congolese rebels and international arms dealers with monies collected in the south and from among southern Sudanese exile communities in the Middle East, Western Europe, and North America. The rebels also captured arms, equipment, and supplies from government troops.

Militarily, the Anyanya controlled much of the southern countryside while government forces occupied the region's major towns. The guerrillas operated at will from remote camps. However, rebel units were too small and scattered to be highly effective in any single area. Estimates of Anyanya personnel strength ranged from 5,000 to 10,000.

Government operations against the rebels declined after the 1969 coup. However, when negotiations failed to result in a settlement, Khartoum increased troop strength in the south to about 12,000 in 1969, and intensified military activity throughout the region. Although the Soviet Union had concluded a US$100 million to US$150 million arms agreement with Sudan in August 1968, which included T-55 tanks, armored personnel carriers, and aircraft, the nation failed to deliver any equipment to Khartoum by May 1969. During this period, Sudan obtained some Soviet-manufactured weapons from Egypt, most of which went to the Sudanese air force. By the end of 1969, however, the Soviet Union had shipped unknown quantities of 85mm antiaircraft guns, sixteen MiG-21s, and five AN-24 transport aircraft. Over the next two years, the Soviet Union delivered an impressive array of equipment to Sudan, including T-54 and T-55 tanks; and BTR-40 and BTR-152 light armored vehicles.

In 1971 Joseph Lagu, who had become the leader of southern forces opposed to Khartoum, proclaimed the creation of the Southern Sudan Liberation Movement (SSLM). Anyanya leaders united behind him, and nearly all exiled southern politicians supported the SSLM. Although the SSLM created a governing infrastructure throughout many areas of southern Sudan, real power remained with Anyanya, with Lagu at its head.

Despite his political problems, Nimeiri remained committed to ending the southern insurgency. He believed he could stop the fighting and stabilize the region by granting regional self-government and undertaking economic development in the south. By October 1971, Khartoum had established contact with the SSLM. After considerable consultation, a conference between SSLM and Sudanese government delegations convened at Addis Ababa, Ethiopia, in February 1972. Initially, the two sides were far apart, the southerners demanding a federal state with a separate southern government and an army that would come under the federal president's command only in response to an external threat to Sudan. Eventually, however, the two sides, with the help of Ethiopia's Emperor Haile Selassie, reached an agreement.

The Addis Ababa accords guaranteed autonomy for a southern region—composed of the three provinces of Equatoria (present-day Al Istiwai), Bahr al Ghazal, and Upper Nile (present-day Aali an Nil)--under a regional president appointed by the national president on the recommendation of an elected Southern Regional Assembly. The High Executive Council or cabinet named by the regional president would be responsible for all aspects of government in the region except such areas as defense, foreign affairs, currency and finance, economic and social planning, and interregional concerns, authority over which would be retained by the national government in which southerners would be represented. Southerners, including qualified Anyanya veterans, would be incorporated into a 12,000-man southern command of the Sudanese army under equal numbers of northern and southern officers. The accords also recognized Arabic as Sudan's official language, and English as the south's principal language, which would be used in administration and would be taught in the schools.

Although many SSLM leaders opposed the settlement, Lagu approved its terms and both sides agreed to a cease-fire. The national government issued a decree legalizing the agreement and creating an international armistice commission to ensure the well-being of returning southern refugees. Khartoum also announced an amnesty, retroactive to 1955. The two sides signed the Addis Ababa Agreement on March 27, 1972, which was thereafter celebrated as National Unity Day.

=== Political Developments ===
After the settlement in the south, Nimeiri attempted to mend fences with northern Muslim religious groups. The government undertook administrative decentralization, popular with the Ansar, that favored rural over urban areas, where leftist activism was most evident. Khartoum also reaffirmed Islam's special position in the country, recognized the sharia as the source of all legislation, and released some members of religious orders who had been incarcerated. However, a reconciliation with conservative groups, which had organized outside Sudan under Sadiq al Mahdi's leadership and were later known as the National Front, eluded Nimeiri.

In August 1972, Nimeiri sought to consolidate his position by creating a Constituent Assembly to draft a permanent constitution. He then asked for the government's resignation to allow him to appoint a cabinet whose members were drawn from the Constituent Assembly. Nimeiri excluded individuals who had opposed the southern settlement or who had been identified with the SSU's pro-Egyptian faction.

In May 1973, the Constituent Assembly promulgated a draft constitution. This document provided for a continuation of presidential government, recognized the SSU as the only authorized political organization, and supported regional autonomy for the south. The constitution also stipulated that voters were to choose members for the 250-seat People's Assembly from an SSU-approved slate. Although it cited Islam as Sudan's official religion, the constitution acknowledged Christianity as the faith of a large number of Sudanese citizens. In May 1974, voters selected 125 members for the assembly; SSU-affiliated occupational and professional groups named 100; and the president appointed the remaining 25.

Discontent with Nimeiri's policies and the increased military role in government escalated as a result of food shortages and the southern settlement, which many Muslim conservatives regarded as surrender. In 1973 and 1974 there were unsuccessful coup attempts against Nimeiri. Muslims and leftist students also staged strikes against the government. In September 1974, Nimeiri responded to this unrest by declaring a state of emergency, purging the SSU, and arresting large numbers of dissidents. Nimeiri also replaced some cabinet members with military personnel loyal to him.

Conservative opposition to Nimeiri coalesced in the National Front, formed in 1974. The National Front included people from Sadiq's wing of Umma; the National Unionist Party; and the Islamic Charter Front, at the time the political arm of the Muslim Brotherhood. Their activity crystallized in a July 1976 Ansar-inspired coup attempt. Government soldiers quickly restored order by killing more than 700 rebels in Khartoum and arresting scores of dissidents, including many prominent religious leaders. Despite this unrest, in the 1977 presidential election Nimeiri was reelected with 98.3% voter turn out, having run unopposed.

=== National Reconciliation ===
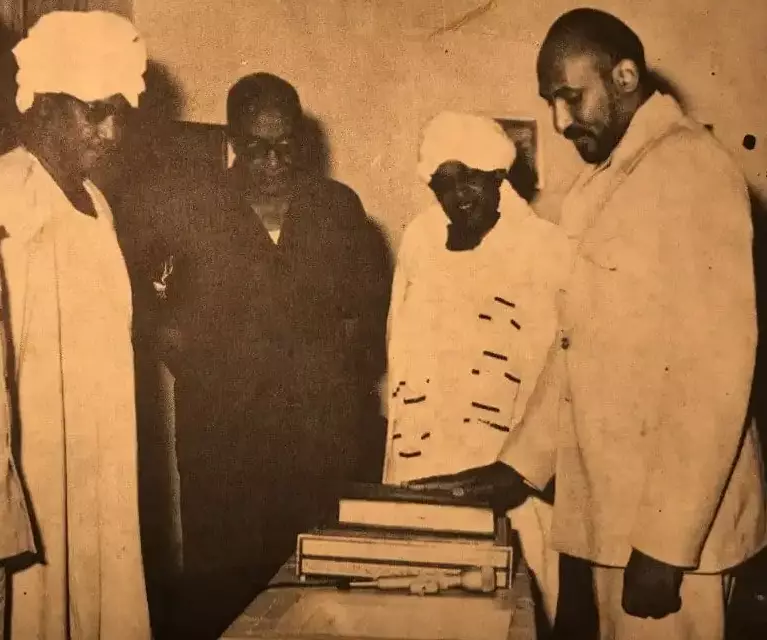
Sadiq al-Mahdi sworn into the government after the 1977 National Reconciliation

Following the 1976 coup attempt, Nimeiri and his opponents adopted more conciliatory policies. In early 1977, government officials met with the National Front in London, and arranged for a conference between Nimeiri and Sadiq al Mahdi in Port Sudan. In what became known as the "national reconciliation," the two leaders signed an eight-point agreement that readmitted the opposition to national life in return for the dissolution of the National Front. The agreement also restored civil liberties, freed political prisoners, reaffirmed Sudan's nonaligned foreign policy, and promised to reform local government. As a result of the reconciliation, the government released about 1,000 detainees and granted an amnesty to Sadiq al Mahdi. The SSU also admitted former supporters of the National Front to its ranks. Sadiq renounced multiparty politics and urged his followers to work within the regime's one-party system.

The first test of national reconciliation occurred during the February 1978 People's Assembly elections. Nimeiri authorized returning exiles who had been associated with the old Umma Party, the Democratic Unionist Party, and the Muslim Brotherhood to stand for election as independent candidates. These independents won 140 of 304 seats, leading many observers to applaud Nimeiri's efforts to democratize Sudan's political system. However, the People's Assembly elections marked the beginning of further political decline. The SSU's failure to sponsor official candidates weakened party discipline and prompted many assembly deputies who also were SSU members to claim that the party had betrayed them. As a result, an increasing number of assembly deputies used their offices to advance personal rather than national interests.

During this time, Nimeiri moved closer to Islamism. Hassan al-Turabi, an Islamist leader who had been imprisoned and exiled after Nimeiri's coup in 1969, was invited back into the country and was promoted to Justice Minister in 1979.

The end of the SSU's political monopoly, coupled with rampant corruption at all levels of government, cast increasing doubt on Nimeiri's ability to govern Sudan. To preserve his regime, Nimeiri adopted a more dictatorial leadership style. He ordered the State Security Organisation to imprison without trial thousands of opponents and dissidents. Nimeiri also dismissed or transferred any minister or senior military officer who appeared to be developing his own power base. Nimeiri selected replacements based on their loyalty to him rather than on their abilities. This strategy caused the president to lose touch with popular feeling and the country's deteriorated political situation.

On June 5, 1983, Nimeiri sought to counter the south's growing political power by redividing the Southern Region into the three old provinces of Bahr al Ghazal, Al Istiwai, and Aali an Nil; he had suspended the Southern Regional Assembly almost two years earlier. The southern-based Sudanese People's Liberation Movement (SPLM) and its military wing, the Sudanese People's Liberation Army (SPLA), which emerged in mid-1983, unsuccessfully opposed this redivision and called for the creation of a new united Sudan.

Within a few months, in September 1983 Nimeiri proclaimed the Sharia as the basis of the Sudanese legal system. Nimeiri's decrees, which became known as the September Laws, were bitterly resented both by secularized Muslims and by the predominantly non-Muslim southerners. Even some conservative Muslims were suspicious of morality laws that banned, for example, "attempted adultery" as they felt there was no Islamic basis for it.(source Mansur Khalid) The SPLM denounced the sharia and the executions and amputations ordered by religious courts. Meanwhile, the security situation in the south had deteriorated so much that by the end of 1983 it amounted to a resumption of the civil war.

==== Unrest and coup ====
In early 1985, anti-government discontent resulted in a general strike in Khartoum. Demonstrators opposed rising food, gasoline, and transport costs. The general strike paralyzed the country. Nimeiri, who was on a visit to the United States, was unable to suppress the rapidly growing demonstrations against his regime. A bloodless military coup led by his defense minister Gen. Abdel Rahman Swar al-Dahab ousted him from power. At the subsequent elections the pro-Islamist leader Sadiq al-Mahdi (who had attempted a coup against Nimeiry in 1976) became prime minister.

== Gallery ==
Flag (1969–1970)

Flag (1970–1985)
Emblem (1969–1970)

Emblem (1970–1985)

Emblem after 1985

== See also ==
- History of Sudan
- First Sudanese Civil War
