= Mohamed al-Baghir Ahmed =

Sudanese politician (1898–1985)

Major general Mohamed al-Baghir Ahmed
- محمد الباقر احمد
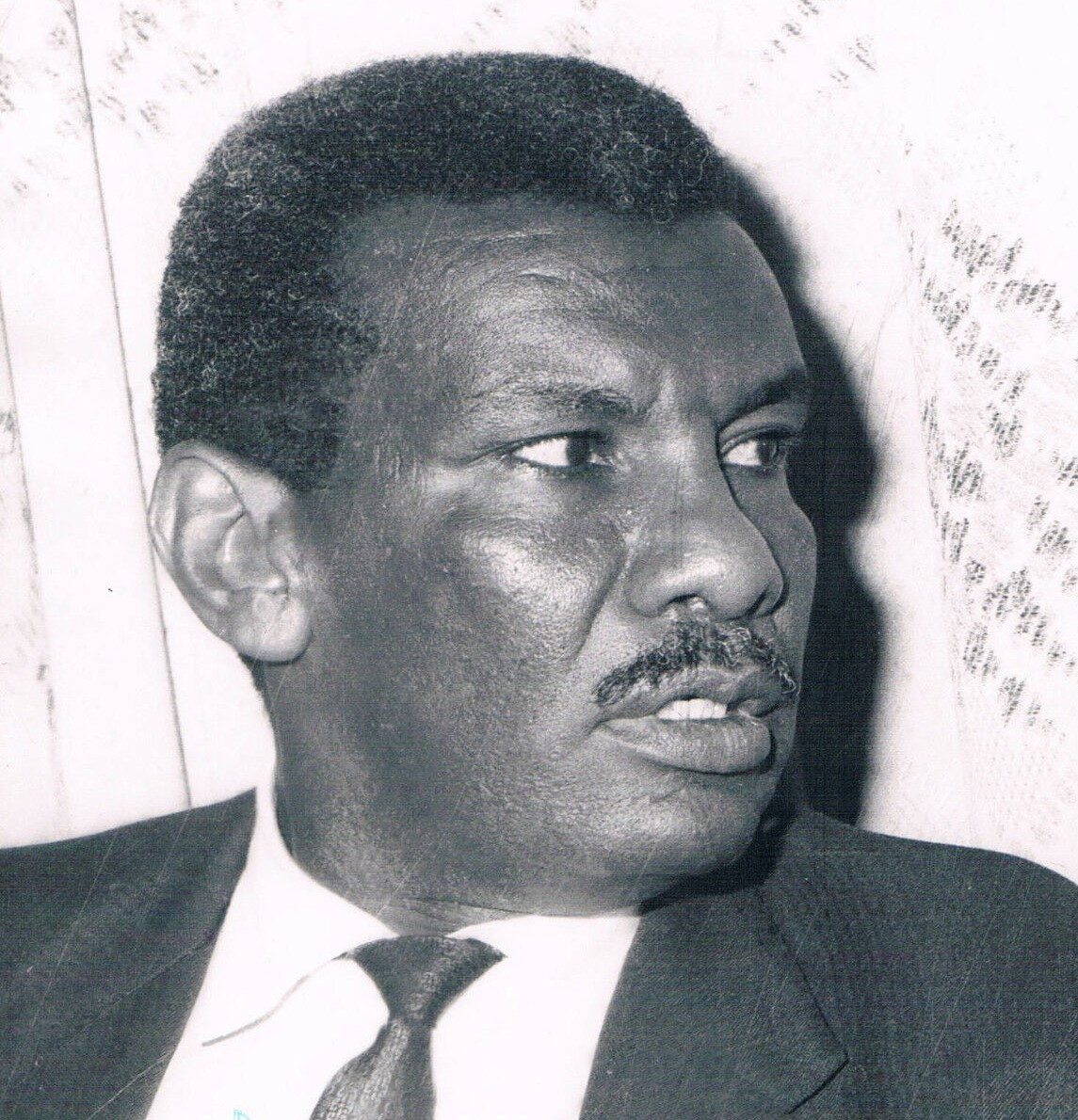

Vice President of Sudan
- In office 1972–1976
- President: Jaafar Nimeiry
- Preceded by: Abel Alier
- Succeeded by: Abu el-Qassim Mohamad Ibrahim

Personal details
- Born: 5 April 1927 Gedaref, Sudan
- Died: 1992 (aged 64–65)
- Party: Sudanese Socialist Union

Military service
- Rank: Major General
- Battles/wars: 1969 Sudanese coup d'état 1971 Sudanese coup d'état

Mohamed al-Baghir Ahmed (Arabic: محمد الباقر احمد; 5 April 1927 – 1992) was a Sudanese military and political figure. He had a distinguished military career, serving in various positions and rising to the rank of Chief of Staff. al-Baghir transitioned to politics and held the position of Minister of the Interior and the first Vice President of Sudan, where he played a significant role after the 1971 failed coup and overseeing the 1972 peace agreement with the South.

== Biography ==
=== Early life and education ===
Mohamed al-Baghir Ahmed was born on 5 April 1927, in El Sofi, located in the Gedaref district of Eastern Sudan. He received his early education in Kassala, followed by Port Sudan, and later attended Omdurman Commercial School. He then joined the Khartoum branch of Cairo University (today's Neelain University), where he completed a Bachelor of Arts degree in geography.

In 1948, al-Baghir enrolled in Sudan's Military College at Wadi Sayyidna, near Omdurman, and graduated as an officer in February 1950. He furthered his military education by attending three courses in England, including one at the Staff College in Camberley in 1961, and two courses in Egypt, including a term at the Egyptian Military Academy in 1968.

=== Military career ===
Upon commissioning, al-Baghir was assigned as an infantry officer to the Eastern Division in 1950. After serving on the general staff of the Infantry School in Omdurman, he was promoted to commanding officer of an infantry regiment within the Eastern Division. He later returned to the Infantry School as an instructor until October 1958, after which he was appointed Chief of Staff of the Southern Command in Juba. In July 1959, he became the Military Governor of Upper Nile Province, and following his Staff College course in England, he joined the Army Headquarters staff in Khartoum.

Although al-Baghir was appointed as military attaché in West Germany in January 1965, diplomatic relations were severed before he could assume the position. Subsequently, he served as the Commander of the Bahr el Ghazal Garrison in the Western Command and was later transferred to the Southern Command as Acting Commander. He became the military attaché at the London embassy in August 1966, but returned a year later when diplomatic relations were severed once again.

Promoted to Brigadier in October 1967, al-Baghir returned to the Southern Command until he was appointed Commandant of the Military College in Omdurman and Commander of Omdurman Garrison in May 1968. Following the May 1969 coup d'état, he retired on pension but was reinstated on 28 December 1969, with the rank of major-general and appointed Deputy Chief of Staff. He eventually succeeded Major-General Khalid Hassan Abbas as Chief of Staff on 1 June 1970.

=== Political career ===
Starting in October 1971, al-Baghir served as the Minister of the Interior. During his tenure, he faced the challenge of managing the aftermath of an unsuccessful coup in July, which involved purging Communists from the administration, and overseeing the evaluation of detainees. al-Baghir became the First Vice–President of the Democratic Republic of Sudan from 1972 to 1976. He played a crucial role as one of the signatories in the peace agreement with South Sudan at Addis Ababa on 27 February 1972. In a surprise, al-Baghir submitted his resignation from all his positions to President Jaafar Nimeiry.

=== Personal life and death ===
al-Baghir had a fondness for horses and served as a chairman of the Khartoum Race Club. He died in 1992.
