= El Hadi Ahmed El Sheikh =

Sudanese Professor of Ophthalmology (1933-2009)

El Hadi Ahmed El Sheikh FRCOphth
- الهادي أحمد الشيخ
- Born: 28 June 1933; Shendi, Sudan
- Died: 23 September 2009 (aged 76); Khartoum, Sudan
- Education: Ain Shams University (BSc, 1959); University of London (PhD)
- Relatives: El Shafiei Ahmed El Sheikh (brother)
- Awards: Gold Medal for Arts and Literature, Sudan; Az-Zubair Prize for Innovation and Scientific Excellence, Sudan
- Scientific career
- Fields: Ophthalmology; Onchocerciasis; Oculoplastic; Dacryocystorhinostomy
- Institutions: University of Khartoum; World Health Organization; Moorfields Eye Hospital; UCL Institute of Ophthalmology; London School of Hygiene and Tropical Medicine

El Hadi Ahmed El Sheikh (Arabic: الهادي أحمد الشيخ; 28 June 1933 – 23 September 2009) was a Sudanese Professor of Ophthalmology at the Department of Ophthalmology, University of Khartoum, and WHO's Research Fellow. El Sheikh established Abu-Hamad Town Hospital in 1962 and the Department of Ophthalmology, University of Khartoum in 1994. He was known for philanthropic work and organising eye care campaigns that offered free treatment for Sudanese and refugees.

== Life and career ==
=== Early life ===
El Sheikh was born on 28 June 1933 in Shendi, Sudan, the youngest in a family of four sisters and brothers. His family were part of the Tijaniyyah Sufi order, a group known for their hospitality and generosity, which would later shape El Sheikh's approach to medicine and treatment accessibility.

=== Medical career ===
El Sheikh first enrolled at the University of Khartoum but left as his family believed the school was elitist and did not align with their values, later entering Ain Shams University. El Sheikh graduated in 1959, and started his medical training at Ain Shams University in 1960 as a house officer before leaving to join Atbara Teaching Hospital in 1961 as a medical officer until 1962.

In 1962, El Sheikh established Abu-Hamad Town Hospital before becoming a registrar for two years at Khartoum Eye Hospital. Later in 1963, he moved to the United Kingdom where he worked at Moorfields Eye Hospital and earned a diploma in Ophthalmology from the Royal College of Physicians of London in 1964 and the Royal College of Surgeons of England in 1964.

El Sheikh returned to Sudan, working at Khartoum Eye Hospital as Junior Eye Specialist, and at Wad Madani Hospital as a relief ophthalmologist, between 1964 and 1965. He then moved to the Department of Surgery, University of Khartoum, as a Lecturer in Ophthalmology in 1967. Later he became an associate professor in 1973.

One of El Sheikh’s siblings was El Shafiei, a well-known Sudanese politician who was executed with Abdel Khaliq Mahjub in 1971 by Jaafar Nimeiry for their involvement in the 1971 Sudanese coup d'état attempt. Thus, after his brother's execution, El Sheikh decided to go to the UK, as he was awarded the World Health Organization (WHO) Research Fellow at the UCL Institute of Ophthalmology, and an Honorary Senior Registrar position in the Moorfields Eye Hospital between 1973–1978. During that period, he completed epidemiology and medical statistics training at the London School of Hygiene and Tropical Medicine (1975–1976). He conducted several fields and laboratory work before obtaining his Doctor of Philosophy from the University of London in 1978.

Upon his return to Sudan in 1988, El Sheikh joined the University of Khartoum as a professor of Ophthalmology. He later established the Department of Ophthalmology in 1994 and retired in 1998.

=== Personal life and death ===
El Sheikh was married and had four children. He died on 23 September 2009 in Khartoum.

== Field work ==
El Sheikh was involved in many projects to improve eye surgery with a keen interest in dacryocystorhinostomy and oculoplastic. El Sheikh worked on several projects with World Health Organization. He was the WHO expert and a member of the steering committee of Onchocerciasis. El Sheikh was the President of the Sudanese Ophthalmological Society (1979–1981), and since 1983, he was a member of the Executive Board of the International Agency for the Prevention of Blindness.

El Sheikh was known for philanthropic work. Since 1990, he, with the assistance of HelpAge International, pioneered organising eye care campaigns and creating mobile eye care units that offered free treatment for more than 23,000 Sudanese and refugees. However, his efforts were not always welcomed, and he was taken to court several times for operating on patients outside hospitals.

== Awards and honours ==
El Sheikh is one of the most celebrated Sudanese doctors, holding a multitude of honors and awards. He was elected a Fellow of the Royal College of Ophthalmologists (FRCOphth) in 1990. In 1995, the National Sudanese Society for Eye Treatment named their annual prize after El Sheikh in honor of his contributions to ophthalmology. The Sudanese government awarded him the Gold Medal for Science, Literature and Arts and Az-Zubair Prize for Innovation and Scientific Excellence in 2003.
