= El-Shafie Ahmed el-Sheikh =

Sudanese labour organiser (1924–1971)

- الشفيع أحمد الشيخ
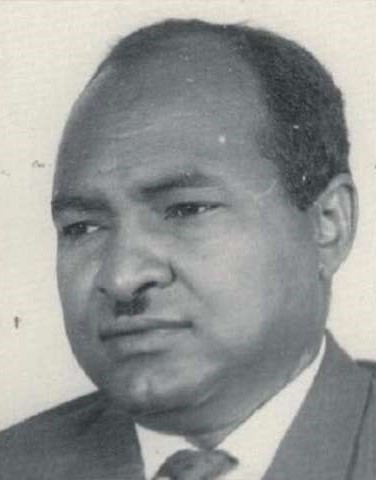
- Born: 2 May 1924; Shendi, Sudan
- Died: 28 July 1972 (aged 48); Kobar prison, Khartoum
- Cause of death: Hanging
- Known for: 1971 Sudanese coup d'état
- Political party: Sudanese Communist Party
- Movement: World Federation of Trade Unions
- Spouse: Fatima Ahmed Ibrahim
- Relatives: El Hadi Ahmed El Sheikh (brother)
- Awards: International Peace Medal (1964); World Peace Council prizes (1965); Lenin Peace Prize (1970)

El-Shafie Ahmed el-Sheikh (Arabic: الشفيع أحمد الشيخ //; 2 May 1924 – 28 July 1971) was Secretary-General of the Sudanese General Federation of Workers' Trade Unions (SWTUF), member of the executive committee of ICATU and vice-president of the World Federation of Trade Unions (WFTU). He was awarded Lenin Peace Prize "For strengthening of peace among peoples" in 1970. After the failed attempt coup in 1971, he was hanged by Nimeiry's government.

== Biography ==
El-Shafia Ahmed el-Sheikh was born on 2 May 1924 in Shendi, River Nile State, in the Ja'alin tribe. el-Sheikh graduated from a craft school in the city Atbara, then he worked as a railway worker and in railway workshops.

=== Trade union ===
el-Sheikh took an active part in the labour and communist movement in Sudan. In 1947, he participated in the creation of the first railway workers' union in Sudan, he became its secretary general and laid the foundations for the future General Federation of Workers' Trade Unions of the Sudan. In 1948, he was appointed Assistant Secretary General of the Federation.

el-Sheikh co-founded the Railway Workers Affairs Authority, which later became the Sudan Workers Union. Before he turned 24, in 1948, he was selected as Assistant Secretary General of Sudanese Trade Unions. He worked to establish links between the Sudanese labour movement and the international and Arab labor movements. He later became the Secretary-General of the Sudanese General Federation of Workers' Trade Unions (SWTUF), member of the executive committee of International Confederation of Arab Trade Unions.

He was elected in 1957 as a Vice President of the World Federation of Trade Unions as the youngest trade union leader to assume this global responsibility. In 1964, he was again elected Assistant Secretary General to the President of the Sudan Workers Union by 55 unions.

Ibrahim Abboud's government tried to prevent a meeting of the General Conference of the Workers of Sudan and the escalation of the struggle of the Sudanese National Movement after that with the participation of most segments of Sudanese society to turn into an uprising that toppled the military regime.

=== Communism and politics ===
Since 1946, he has been a member of Sudanese Communist Party (UPC). In 1951, he was elected a member of the Central Committee of the Party, and then secretary of the Central Committee and a member of the Politburo of the Central Committee of UPC. For his activities, he was repeatedly subjected to reprisals by the authorities, arrests and imprisonment, for example, for resisting Ibrahim Abboud military regime was sentenced to five years in prison in 1959. He was awarded the International Peace Medal while he was in prison, which he was able to receive after his release in 1964, when 55 trade unions re-elected him as Assistant Secretary General of the Federation of Workers' Trade Unions of Sudan.

When a coalition government headed by Mr. Sirr Al-Khatam Al-Khalifa was formed after the Sudanese revolution of October 1964, el-Sheikh was named a minister representing the Labor Union, for the period from October 1964 to February 1965.

Since 1965, el-Sheikh has been selected as a member of World Peace Council. Since June 1967, he has headed the Sudanese Committee for the Protection of the Rights of Arab Peoples, formed in response to Six-Day war. On 16 April 1970, he was awarded the Lenin Peace Prize, "for the consolidating peace among peoples" for 1968 and 1969.

=== Prosecution ===
We were at peace
The Wadi high in uproar
Hantoub high protested
Tagat high got in higher drunk
We are at peace
Inside a park
Oh ya oh ya
Comrade Wasila sing us the tunes of struggle
Safr (He just left)
Hamz al-Jack revolted and we are his followers
Safr
Tomorrow el-Shafie will break his chains
Safr
God bless Korea and the young of Korea
Oh ya oh ya

— Abdullahi A.Ibrahim, Bolshevize it, O God

In July 1971, after the short-lived coup of Major Hashim Al-Atta and a counter-coup, the Sudanese authorities of the general Jaafar Nimeiry accused el-Sheikh and other representatives of the Communist Party leadership (such as Abdel Khaliq Mahjub and Joseph Garang) in involvement in the coup attempt. He was imprisoned and tortured in Kobar prison. He was sentenced him to death by a military tribunal on 26 July 1971. According to the Radio Omdurman, the verdict was approved by General Nimeiri. Before being hanged on 28 July 1971, el-Sheikh threw the rope on himself and proclaimed: "Long live the Sudanese people! Long live the working class!."

In total, eleven officers, five civilians executed, hundreds of detainees, pursuers, and expelled from their jobs.

=== Aftermath ===
Following the executions, the Sudanese government dissolved several trade union federations and their affiliated unions, including the Sudanese General Federation of Workers' Trade Unions, the Sudanese General Federation of Employees, and the Sudanese General Federation of Teachers' Trade Unions. The government argues that this dissolution was carried out with the consent of certain trade union organizations to reorganize the trade unions under new legislation. The International Labour Organization (ILO) Committee highlights that such actions by the executive branch, without ensuring the right to defense, violate trade union rights. The newly enacted Trade Unions Act imposes limitations on the formation of multiple unions within a sector, creating a trade union monopoly that contradicts the principles of freedom of association. The ILO Committee recommends deferring further examination of the case until the government provides its response to additional allegations and information presented by the World Federation of Trade Unions.

In 1973, delegates and visitors to the Trade Union Congress stood for two minutes silence to observe the memory of el-Sheikh.

On 2 May 2007, Fatima Ahmed Ibrahim, el-Sheikh wife and a prominent member of the Sudanese Communist Party and a parliamentarian, was suspended from participating in parliamentary sessions for a month and was denied her allowances. This decision was made after she physically attacked Abulgassim Mohamed Ibrahim, a representative of the National Congress Party (NCP), during a session. Fatima accused him of being responsible for the torture and murder of her husband, el-Sheikh. The incident caused chaos, with some demanding Fatima's expulsion from the Assembly. However, the first deputy speaker, Atem Garang, insisted on following the proper procedures. The Communist Party distanced itself from Fatima's actions, stating that they were her personal behavior. The NCP condemned the incident, and the Assembly launched an investigation, expressing concerns about potential negative portrayal of Sudan in the international media.
