= Ministry of Defence (Sudan) =

Government ministry of Sudan

Coordinates: 15°36′34″N 32°31′56″E

Republic of the Sudan Ministry of Defence

Agency overview
- Jurisdiction: Government of Sudan
- Headquarters: Khartoum
- Agency executive: Hassan Daoud Kayan, Minister of Defence
- Website: Official website

The Ministry of Defence of the Republic of Sudan is the government ministry responsible for defence and the Sudanese Armed Forces.

== History ==
After independence, Prime Minister Abdallah Khalil, secretary of the National Umma Party, served as Minister of Defence.

The President of Sudan was responsible for appointing the Minister of Defence.

After the overthrow of General Ibrahim Abboud's regime in October 1964, Lieutenant General El Khawad Mohammed was appointed as a member of the ruling Supreme Council of the Armed Forces and commander-in-chief of the Sudanese Armed Forces.

Then-Colonel Jaafar Nimeiri came to power in the 1969 Sudanese coup d'état. Khalid Hassan Abbas was appointed as Minister of Defense on 29 October 1969 following a cabinet reshuffle implemented to strengthen the army's control over the Sudanese government. Abbas was an anti-Mahdist and non-communist. As Defense Minister he, alongside Babiker, would push President Nimeiri to adopt a more aggressive response to the rising threat to the government posed by the Ansar movement, resulting in the brutal crackdown seen on Aba Island in 1970. Abbas served as Defense Minister until 16 April 1972, at which point Nimeiri took over the role.

U.S. personnel met Defence Minister General Abdul Majid Hamid Khalil (known in the Sudan as Abdul Majid) in 1979. Two days after the signing of the peace agreement between Ahmed al-Mirghani and John Garang on 16 November 1988, a Sudanese Air Force Lockheed C-130 Hercules carrying Abdul Majid from Wau to Khartoum, together with the Army Commander-in-Chief, General Fathi Ahmed Ali, was hit by a missile, knocking out one of its engines. In January 1982, President Nimeiri again assumed the office himself after retiring Abdul Majid, who had been simultaneously First Vice President, Minister of Defence, commander-in-chief of the armed forces, and secretary-general of the single ruling Sudanese Socialist Union party.

Nimeiri had served himself as Minister of Defence for long stretches in 1972-73 (promoted himself General in 1973), 1975–76, and 1978-79 after retiring other ministers. From 1976-78, the Minister of Defence has usually held the rank of General, when Bashir Mohamed Ali held the position.

Since the accession of the Sovereignty Council of Sudan, the effective commander-in-chief of the armed forces is Lieutenant General Abdel Fattah al-Burhan, former head of the Transitional Military Council.

== Ministers of Defence ==
Ministers of Defence have included:

No.	Name	Term	Party/Notes
1	Khalafallah Khalid	January 1954 – November 1955	
2	Ismail Al-Azhari	17 November 1955 – 2 February 1956	Civilian
3	Abdallah Khalil	3 February 1956 – 17 November 1958	Former brigadier in the Sudan Defence Force
4	Brigadier Ibrahim Abboud	18 November 1958 – 21 October 1964	Abboud Govt; Later promoted
5	Sirr Al-Khatim Al-Khalifa	to 7 June 1965	Prime Minister of the first and second transitional government (1964–1965)
6	Mohamed Ahmed Mahgoub	8 June 1965 – 5 May 1966	
7	Amin Al-Tom Sati	5 May 1966 – 27 July 1966	
8	Abdullah Abdul Rahman Nagdallah	28 July 1966 – 14 December 1966	
9	Ahmed Abdel Rahman Al-Mahdi	15 December 1966 – 15 July 1967	al-Mahdi Govt
10	Adam Musa Madbou	16 July 1967 – 26 May 1968	
11	Muhammad Ahmad Mahgoub	27 May 1968 to 25 May 1969	
12	Colonel Jaafar Nimeiri	25 May 1969 – 19 June 1969	
13	Brigadier Omar Hajj Moussa	20 June 1969 – 28 October 1969	
14	Major General Khalid Hassan Abbas	29 October 1969 – 16 April 1972	
15	Major General Jaafar Nimeiri	17 April 1972 – 7 October 1973	
16	Lieutenant General Awad Khallafalla	8 October 1972 – 25 October 1975	Air Force officer. As part of the U.S. diplomatic cables leak, it was disclosed that the United States Embassy Khartoum had dispatched a message saying that as of November 7, 1974, General Awad Khallafalla had been dismissed as Minister of Defence and Commander-in-Chief of the Sudanese Armed Forces, retired, and been appointed as an advisor on military and aviation affairs in the office of the presidency.
17	Jaafar Nimeiri	26 October 1975 – 9 August 1976	
18	General Bashir Mohamed Ali	10 August 1976 – 1 February 1979	
19	General Jaafar Nimeiri	2 February 1979 – 28 April 1979	
20	General Abdul Majid Hamid Khalil	29 May 1979 – 25 January 1982	Formerly commander of the Port Sudan Area. Had been simultaneously First Vice President, Minister of Defence, commander-in-chief of the armed forces, and secretary-general of the single ruling Sudanese Socialist Union party before he was retired by Nimeiri.
21	Field Marshal Jaafar Nimeiri	26 January 1982 – 3 March 1985	
22	Lieutenant General Abdel Rahman Swar al-Dahab	3 March 1985 – 6 April 1985	
23	Field Marshal Abdel Rahman Swar al-Dahab	6 April 1985 – 23 April 1985	As Chair of the Transitional Military Council
24	Major General A.H. / Othman Abdullah Muhammad	22 April 1985 – 3 May 1986	Both de Waal 2015 and Salmon 2007 named the Minister of Defence in July 1985 as Major General Burma Fadlallah Nasir.
25	Sadiq al-Mahdi	4 May 1986 – 14 May 1988	Civilian
26	Abdul Majid Hamid Khalil	15 May 1988 – 25 April 1989	
27	Major General Othman Mubarak Rahma	26 April 1989 – 30 June 1989	
28	Brigadier (later Staff Lieutenant General) Omar Hassan Ahmed Al-Bashir	1 July 1989 – 19 October 1993	Previously Airborne Forces; Commander, 8th Infantry Brigade, as a Brigadier, 1987 – 30 June 1989.
29	Staff General Hassan Abdel-Rahman	10 October 1993 – 8 March 1998	
30	Staff Lieutenant General Ibrahim Suleiman Hassan	3 March 1998 – c. June 1999	Africa Confidential reported his dismissal as Armed Forces Chief of Staff on 24 October 1997. Defence minister the next year; later a member of parliament .
31	Staff Lieutenant General Abdul Rahman Sirr al Khatim	7 July 1999 – 7 July 2000	Appointment reported March 8, 1999: "Bashir appointed chief spokesman of the army, Lt. Gen Abdul Rahman Sir al-Khatim, as the new minister," SUNA reported. Sudanese newspapers quoted al-Khatim as saying five Sudanese army soldiers were killed and nine wounded in a clash on April 11, 1999 with rebels near Kassala (AFP 15 /Apr/99) Later Ambassador to Ethiopia (?)
32	Major General Bakri Hassan Saleh	11 July 2000 – 21 September 2004	Also reported by WP as "11 July 2000-21 September 2005."
33	Major General Ahmed Khaled	21 September 2004 – 21 September 2005	
34	Lieutenant General Abdel Rahim Mohammed Hussein	22 September 2005 – 3 February 2006	Air Force, engineer branch
35	General Abdel Rahim Mohammed Hussein	3 February 2006 – 6 June 2015	Promoted to full general
36	Mustafa Osman Obeid Salim	6 June 2015 – August 2015	Obeid also served temporarily as Minister of National Defence after taking over from Abdel Rahim Mohammed Hussein from 6 June until August 2015, when he was replaced with Ahmed Awad Ibn Auf.
37	Ahmed Awad Ibn Auf	23 August 2015 – 14 April 2019	
38	Unknown	April – September 2019	
39	General Jamal al-Din Omar	September 2019 – c. 25 March 2020	Died of a heart attack while taking part in negotiations in Juba, South Sudan
40	Major General Yassin Ibrahim	2 June 2020 – 2025	Retired general
41	Hassan Daoud Kayan	28 June 2025 – present	

== See also ==
- Cabinet of Sudan
