= May Coup =

May Coup may refer to:

- May Coup (Serbia), 1903
- May Coup (Poland), 1926
- May Coup (South Korea), 1961
- 28 May 1926 coup d'état, Portugal
- 25 May 1969 Sudanese coup d'état, Sudan
