= Farouk Osman Hamadallah =

Sudanese general and politician (died 1971)

- فاروق عثمان حمدالله

Minister of Interior
- In office May 1969 – November 1970
- President: Gaafar Nimeiry

Personal details
- Born: Unknown
- Died: 28 July 1971 Khartoum, Sudan
- Cause of death: Execution by firing squad
- Party: Military / Sudanese Free Officers Movement
- Education: Sudanese Military College

Farouk Osman Hamadallah (Arabic: فاروق عثمان حمدالله; unknown – 28 July 1971) was a Sudanese military officer and politician who played a central role in the country's brief shift toward socialism following the 1969 coup d’état.

== Political career ==
Hamadallah was a leading member of the Sudanese Free Officers Movement and a key architect of the May 1969 coup which brought Colonel Gaafar Nimeiry to power. Following the coup, he was appointed to the National Revolutionary Command Council (NRCC) and served as the Minister of Interior.

During the early years of the military regime, the government maintained a fragile "progressive alliance" with the Sudanese Communist Party (SCP). However, as ideological disputes over economic policy and regional integration escalated, Nimeiry moved to consolidate his own power and purge the leftist elements from the state apparatus. In November 1970, Hamadallah, alongside fellow leftist officers Hashem al-Atta and Babikir al-Nur Osman, was abruptly dismissed from the NRCC and stripped of his ministerial duties.

== 1971 coup and execution ==
In July 1971, military officers aligned with the communists and led by Hashem al-Atta staged a coup that successfully seized power in Khartoum for three days.

At the time of the uprising, Hamadallah and Babikir al-Nur were in London, where Hamadallah had accompanied al-Nur for medical treatment. The new revolutionary council named al-Nur as the new head of state and Hamadallah as his deputy.

Although the coup initially faced no military resistance, it lacked broad popular support among the Sudanese public and drew immediate hostility from neighboring countries, particularly Egypt and Libya. To assume their new leadership roles, the two officers boarded a regular BOAC commercial flight returning to Sudan. However, in a decisive intervention against the communist takeover, Libyan leader Muammar Gaddafi ordered fighter jets to intercept the British airliner in mid-air, forcing it to land in Benghazi.

Hamadallah and al-Nur were detained by Libyan authorities. Following the collapse of the coup in Khartoum and the reinstatement of Nimeiry, Gaddafi extradited the two men back to Sudan. Hamadallah was convicted of treason by a summary military tribunal and was executed by a firing squad in Khartoum in late July 1971.

== Sources ==
=== Academic sources ===
- Korn, David A. (1993). Assassination in Khartoum. Bloomington: Indiana University Press. ISBN 978-0253332028.
- Niblock, Tim (1987). Class and Power in Sudan: The Dynamics of Sudanese Politics, 1898–1985. London: Palgrave Macmillan. ISBN 978-1-349-08836-2.
- Reich, Bernard (1990). Political Leaders of the Contemporary Middle East and North Africa: A Biographical Dictionary. Greenwood Publishing Group. ISBN 9780313262135.
- Shillington, Kevin (2005). Encyclopedia of African History. Vol. 1. New York: Fitzroy Dearborn. ISBN 978-1-57958-245-6.

=== Press sources ===
- The Southeast Missourian (1971-07-23). "Execute Leaders of Sudan Coup". The Southeast Missourian. Cape Girardeau, Missouri.
- The Telegraph (2009-06-01). "Gaafar al-Nimeiry". The Telegraph.
