= National Revolutionary Command Council (Sudan) =

Ten-people body that governed Sudan after the 1969 coup d'état

National Revolutionary Command Council مجلس قيادة الثورة الوطنية
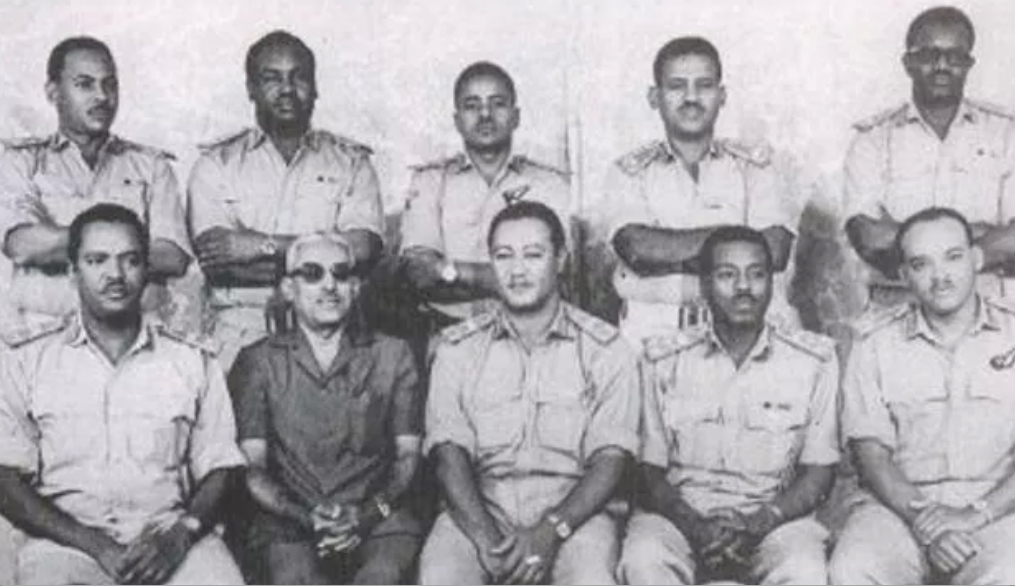
- The National Revolutionary Command Council.
- Abbreviation: NRCC
- Predecessor: Revolutionary Council (22 July 1971)
- Successor: Revolutionary Council (19 July 1971)
- Formation: 25 May 1969 (first time); 22 July 1971 (seccond time)
- Dissolved: 19 July 1971 (first time); 12 October 1971 (second time)
- Type: Acting Presidency; Collective leadership
- Legal status: First time dissolved on 19 July 1971 and replaced with the Revolutionary Council; Second time dissolved after a referendum. Nimeiry became President constitutionally.
- Headquarters: Khartoum
- Region served: Democratic Republic of Sudan
- Members: 10 (until November 1970); 7 (after November 1970)
- Chairman: Maj. Gen. Jaafar Nimeiry
- Deputy Chairman: Babiker Awadalla and Khalid Hassan Abbas
- Affiliations: Presidency of Sudan; Sudanese Army; Parliament

The National Revolutionary Command Council (NRCC) or sometime just Revolutionary Command Council (RCC) was the body that ruled Sudan after the coup d'état in May 1969. It was disbanded in October 1971.

Initially Babiker Awadalla, a lawyer, served as Premier, but was then moved by Maj-Gen Gaafar Nimeiry to become deputy chair of the council on 26 November 1969. Joseph Garang, a southerner, was also on the council in its initial days.

== Members (in 1970) ==
The other members (1970) were as follows:

- Farouk Hamadallah (Purged in 1970)
- Khalid Hassan Abbas
- Mamoun Awad
- Abul Kassem Hashem
- Muhammad Ahmed Abd al-Qadir
- Abu el-Qassim Mohamad Ibrahim
- Abu Bakr al-Nur (Purged in 1970)
- Hashem al Atta (Purged in 1970)

== See also ==
- Egyptian Revolutionary Command Council
- Libyan Revolutionary Command Council
- Revolutionary Command Council (Iraq)
