= 1971 Sudanese presidency referendum =

- 15 September 1971
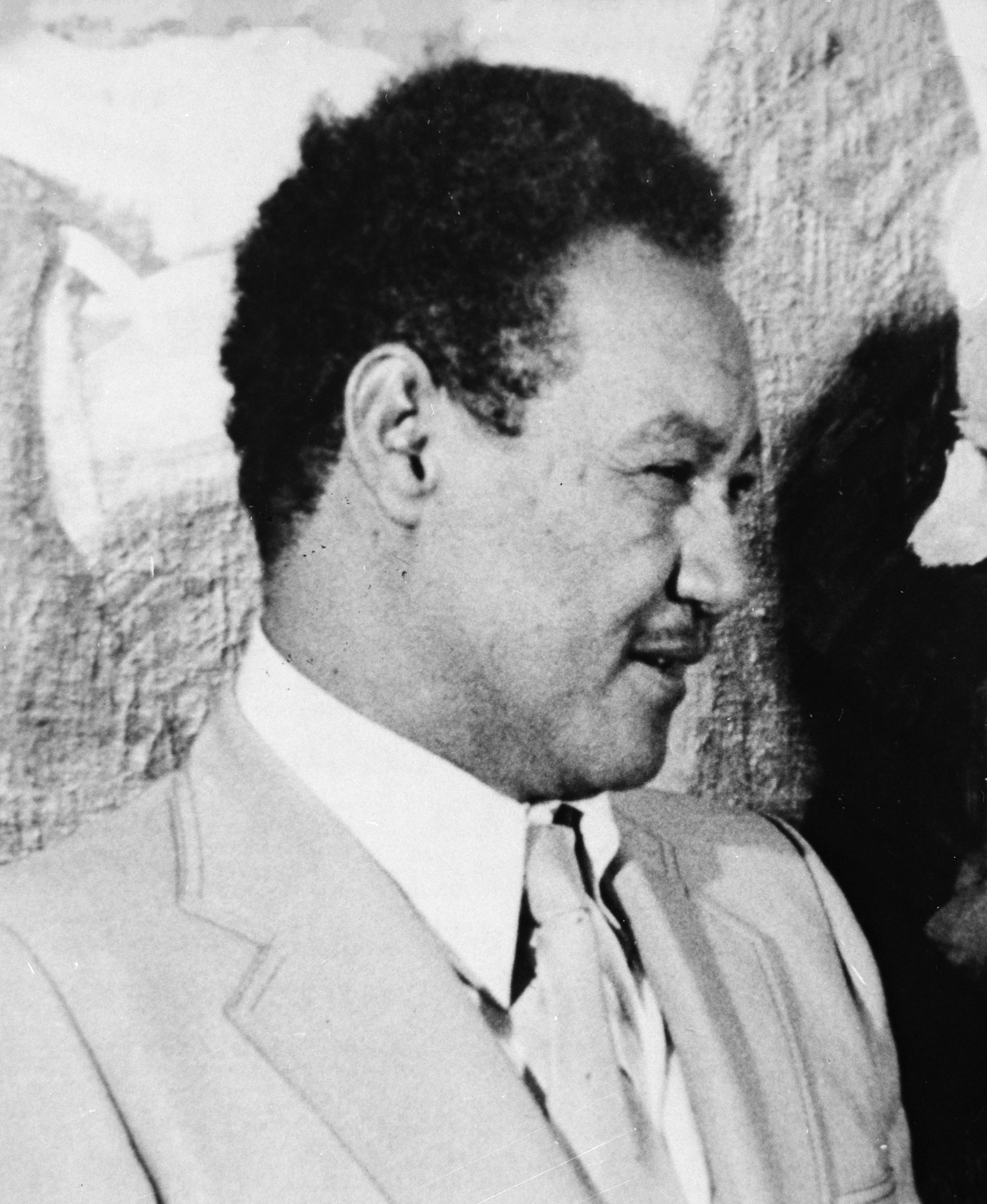
Nominee	Jaafar Nimeiry
Party	SSU
Popular vote	3,839,374
Percentage	98.6%
President before election
Jaafar Nimeiry
SSU
Elected President
Jaafar Nimeiry
SSU

A referendum on the presidency of Jaafar Nimeiry was held in Sudan on 15 September 1971. It came after Nimeiry was overthrown in a Communist coup in July, followed by his reinstatement. He was backed by 98.6% of voters, with a turnout of 92.9%.

== Results ==
Candidate	Party	Votes	%
Jaafar Nimeiry	Sudanese Socialist Union	3,839,374	98.55
Against		56,314	1.45
Total		3,895,688	100.00
Registered voters/turnout		4,191,874	–
Source: Nohlen et al.
