= Joseph Garang =

Sudanese politician (1932–1971)

Joseph Ukel Garang Wel
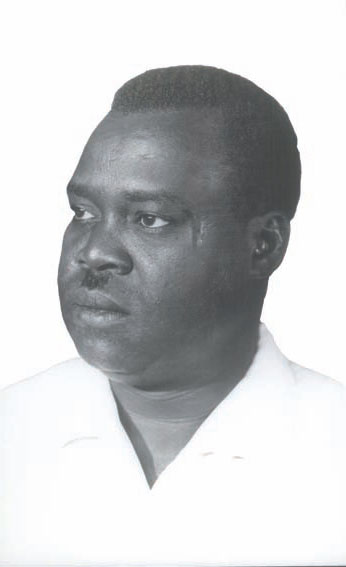
- Garang, shortly before his death in 1971.

Minister of State for Southern Affairs
- In office 1969–1971
- President: Gaafar Nimeiry

Personal details
- Born: 1932
- Died: 28 July 1971 (aged 39) Khartoum, Sudan
- Cause of death: Execution by hanging
- Party: Sudanese Communist Party
- Education: Rumbek Secondary School
- Alma mater: University of Khartoum

Joseph Ukel Garang Wel (1932 – 28 July 1971) was a South Sudanese Marxist politician, lawyer, and a leading intellectual figure within the Sudanese Communist Party (SCP). He served as the Minister of State for Southern Affairs in the government of the Democratic Republic of Sudan from 1969 until his execution in 1971, following Gaafar Nimeiry’s reaction to a short-lived coup d’état that year against his regime.

== Education and early career ==
Garang attended St. Antony's Bussere (1944–1948) and Rumbek Secondary School (1949–1953). In 1957, he became the first South Sudanese male to obtain a law degree upon graduating from the Faculty of Law at the University of Khartoum in Sudan. Shortly after graduation, he declined an offer to become a chief justice. Instead, Garang chose to practice as an attorney and dedicate himself to his political career.

== Theoretical framework and political involvement ==
Garang was a prominent theoretician of the Sudanese Communist Party. Analyzing the chronic conflict between northern and southern Sudan through the lens of historical materialism, Garang rejected the dominant narrative that framed the First Sudanese Civil War as a purely racial or religious clash between an Arab-Islamic north and an African-Christian south. According to his Marxist interpretation, the marginalization of the south was fundamentally a product of uneven capitalist development, British colonial policies, and the exploitation of the southern peasantry by the northern traditionalist establishment. Consequently, he vehemently opposed the secessionist demands of the Anyanya rebels, arguing that the liberation of the south could only be achieved through a unified, socialist Sudan built on cross-ethnic class solidarity.

Following the military coup of May 1969, President Gaafar Nimeiry forged a fragile "progressive alliance" with the political left and appointed Garang as the first Minister of State for Southern Affairs. In this capacity, Garang became the principal architect of the historic "June Declaration" of 1969. This state policy officially recognized the historical and cultural differences of the south and promised regional autonomy within a united, socialist framework, shifting the government's approach away from military assimilation.

== 1971 coup and execution ==
The governing alliance between the military regime and the communists rapidly deteriorated over ideological alignment and economic policy. In July 1971, military officers affiliated with the PCS, led by Hashem al-Atta, briefly overthrew Nimeiry’s regime.

Upon regaining power three days later with decisive foreign support, Nimeiry initiated a systematic and violent purge of the communist leadership. Garang, alongside SCP General Secretary Abdel Khaliq Mahjub and prominent trade unionist Shafie Ahmed el Sheikh, was convicted as a conspirator by a summary military tribunal. He was executed by hanging in Khartoum on 28 July 1971.

== Bibliography ==
=== Academic sources ===
- Niblock, Tim (1987). Class and Power in Sudan: The Dynamics of Sudanese Politics, 1898–1985. London: Palgrave Macmillan. ISBN 978-1-349-08836-2.
- Korn, David A. (1993). Assassination in Khartoum. Bloomington: Indiana University Press. ISBN 978-0253332028.

=== Press sources ===
- The Southeast Missourian (23 July 1971). "Execute Leaders of Sudan Coup". Southeast Missourian. Cape Girardeau, Missouri.
- The Washington Post (28 July 1971). "Communist Leader Sentenced By Military Court". The Washington Post.
- The Telegraph (1 June 2009). "Gaafar al-Nimeiry". The Telegraph.
