= Abdul Majid Khalil =

Sudanese soldier and politician

General Abdul Majid Khalil
- عبد الماجد حامد خليل

First Vice President of Sudan
- In office June 1979 – 25 January 1982
- President: Jaafar Nimeiry
- Preceded by: Abu el-Qassim Mohamad Ibrahim
- Succeeded by: Omar Muhammad al-Tayib

Personal details
- Born: 1 January 1935 El-Obeid, Anglo-Egyptian Sudan
- Died: April 2021 (aged 86)

Military service
- Rank: General

General Abdul Majid Hamid Khalil (Arabic: عبد الماجد حامد خليل, 1935–2021) was a Sudanese soldier and politician.

== Biography ==
Khalil was born on 1 January in 1935 in El-Obeid. He was educated at the Military College of Sudan. He became the commander of Port Sudan military zone.

During the Nimeiry era, Khalil was First Vice President, a general of the army, Minister of Defense, commander-in-chief of the armed forces, and secretary general of the Sudanese Socialist Union., and regarded as the Nimeiry's heir apparent. He was appointed Minister of Defense from 28 May 1979 to 25 January 1982. He was First Vice President of Gaafar Nimeiry from June 1979 to 25 January 1982. Nimeiry forced him to retire on 25 January 1982, and reportedly put him under house arrest.

After Nimeiry was ousted, during the civilian government of Prime Minister Sadiq al-Mahdi, Khalil was again appointed Minister of Defense from 15 May 1988 to February 1989. He resigned to protest the civilian government's procrastination. His resignation was a key event in the government's collapse. He was a supporter of Addis Abeba Peace Agreement to resolve the civil war in Southern Sudan, even though his plane was hit by a rebel SAM-7 ground-to-air missile in November 1988. Despite his links with Nimeiry, he was widely respected as a person not tainted by the Nimeiry-era corruption.

He died in April 2021 due to an illness.
