= Abu el-Qassim Mohamad Ibrahim =

Sudanese soldier and politician (1937–2022)

General Abu el-Qassim Mohamad Ibrahim
- أبو القاسم محمد إبراهيم
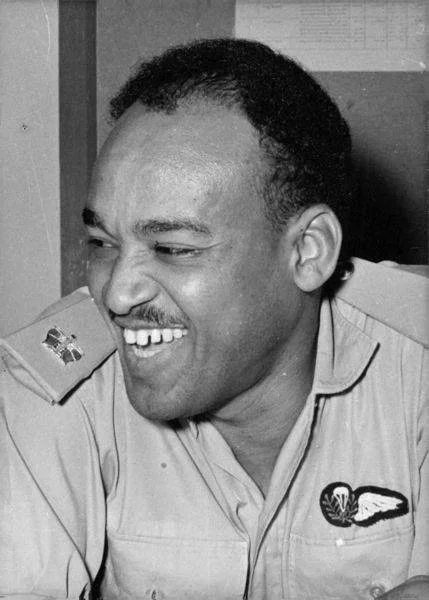
- Abu el-Qassim Mohamad in the late 1970s

First Vice President of Sudan
- In office 1977–1979
- President: Jaafar Nimeiry
- Preceded by: Mohamed al-Baghir Ahmed
- Succeeded by: Abdul Majid Hamid Khalil

Personal details
- Born: November 1937 Omdurman, Anglo-Egyptian Sudan
- Died: 20 April 2022 (aged 84)

Abu el-Qassim Mohamad Ibrahim (1937–2022) was a Sudanese soldier and politician.

Ibrahim was born in November 1937 in Omdurman. He was educated at the Military College of Sudan until 1961. He had a military career, and was an instructor at the Infantry Training School in Gebeit from 1968 to 1969.

Ibrahim became a members of the National Revolutionary Command Council in 1969. He was then appointed to a number of cabinet positions. He was appointed as Minister of Local Government in October 1969 and served until July 1970. He was assistant Prime Minister for the Armed Forces from July to November 1970. He was Minister of the Interior from November 1970 to October 1971. He was Minister of Health from October 1971 to October 1973, and then Minister of Health and Social Welfare until 1974. He was Minister of Agriculture, Food and Natural Resources from 1974 to 1976. He was also part of Sudanese Socialist Union political bureau. Ibrahim was military commander in Khartoum Province from 1976 to 1979. He was appointed First Vice President of Sudan from 1977 to 1979. Later he was appointed Minister of National Assembly Affairs.

Ibrahim was again Minister of Health from January 2000 to June 2001. He died on 20 April 2022.
