= Khalid Hassan Abbas =

Sudanese general and politician (1936–2015)

- خالد حسن عباس
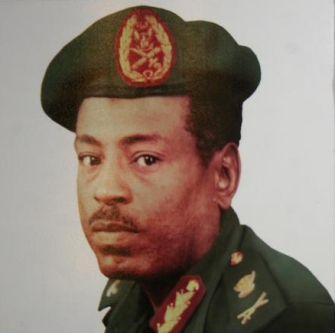
- Abbas c. 1970

Minister of Health
- In office 1974–1992
- President: Gaafar Nimeiry
- Preceded by: Nazir Dafallah
- Succeeded by: Ali Muhammad Fadi

Deputy Chairman of Junta
- In office 1969–1971
- President: Gaafar Nimeiry
- Succeeded by: Abel Alier

Personal details
- Born: 17 March 1936
- Died: 20 August 2015 (aged 79)

Military service
- Allegiance: Democratic Republic of Sudan
- Branch/service: Sudanese Army
- Years of service: 1956–1985
- Battles/wars: First Sudanese Civil War; 1971 Sudanese coup d'état Second Sudanese Civil War

Khalid Hassan Abbas (Arabic: خالد حسن عباس; March 17, 1936 – August 20, 2015) was a Sudanese general and politician. Abbas served as vice president, minister of defence, minister of health, minister of communications and transport and commander in chief of the armed forces of Sudan. He is recognised for his intelligence although he remained silent and peaceful all his life.

Abbas rose to prominence as a result of his involvement in the 1969 Sudanese coup d'état, following which he became the Deputy Chairman of the ruling National Revolutionary Command Council.

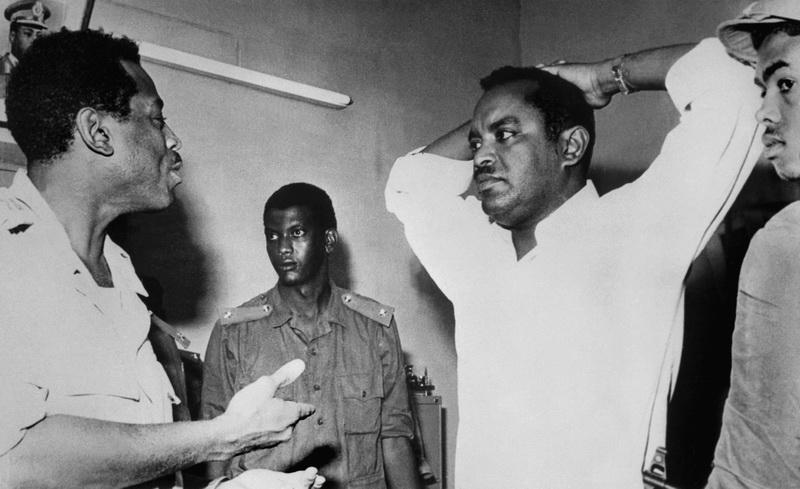
Abbas (left) interrogating coup leader Hashem al Atta

Abbas was appointed as Minister of Defense on 29 October 1969 following a cabinet reshuffle implemented to strengthen the army's control over the Sudanese government. Abbas, an anti-Mahdist and non-communist, was given the role. As Defense Minister he, alongside Babiker, would push Nimeiry to adopt a more aggressive response to the rising threat to the government posed by the Ansar movement, resulting in the brutal crackdown seen on Aba Island in 1970.

Abbas's tenure also saw the attempted 1971 Sudanese coup d'état, during which his younger brother was killed. The RCC was disbanded following the 1971 coup attempt at Abbas's insistence, and Nimeiry instead assumed the title of President in September 1971. Abbas served as Defense Minister until 16 April 1972, at which point Nimeiry took over the role.

Abbas died on 20 August 2015 in Omdurman and was buried in Albakri cemetery in Omdurman .

Military offices
Preceded by Brigadier Omar Hajj Moussa	Minister of Defence; October 1969–April 1972	Succeeded by Gaafar Nimeiry
