= Abdel Khaliq Mahjub =

Sudanese politician (1927–1971)

- عبد الخالق محجوب
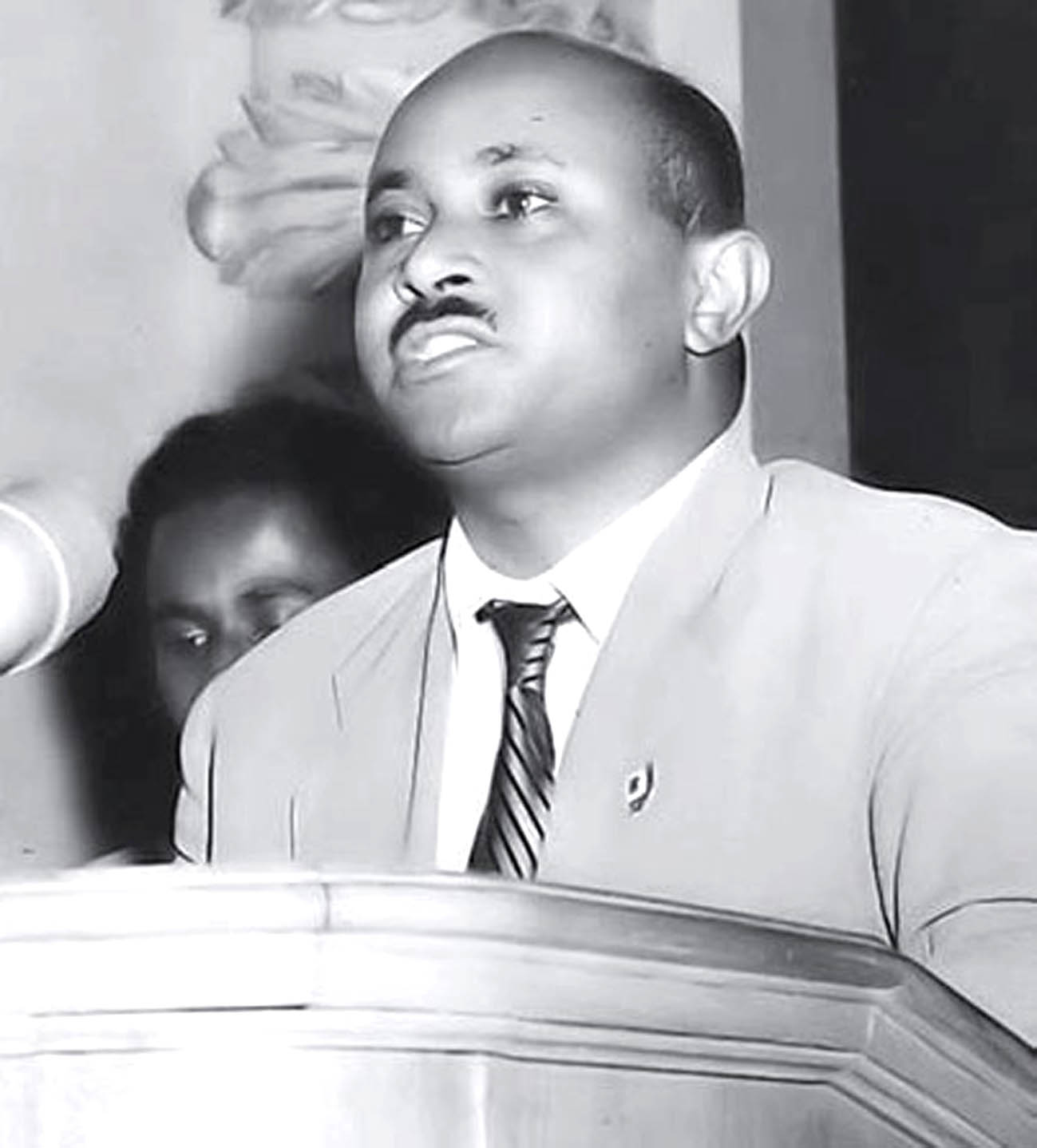

General secretary of the Sudanese Communist Party
- In office 1949–1971
- Succeeded by: Muhammad Ibrahim Nugud

Personal details
- Born: 23 September 1927 Omdurman, Anglo-Egyptian Sudan
- Died: 28 July 1971 (aged 43) Kobar prison, Democratic Republic of the Sudan
- Cause of death: Hanging
- Party: Sudanese Communist Party
- Relations: Muhammad Mahjub Uthman (brother)

Abdel Khaliq Mahjub (Arabic: عبد الخالق محجوب, romanized: ʿAbd al-Khāliq Maḥjūb) (23 September 1927 – 28 July 1971) was a Sudanese communist politician and theoretician.

Mahjub was born in Omdurman. He served as the general secretary of the Sudanese Communist Party (SCP) from 1949 until his death by execution in Khartoum during the dictatorship of Gaafar Nimeiry. Following his execution, Muhammad Ibrahim Nugud became the leader of the party.

== Biography ==
=== Views and ideology ===
Mahjub was introduced to communist ideas while studying at Fuad I University in Egypt, from which he was expelled in 1948 for political activities. He became the general secretary of the Sudanese Communist Party in February 1949.

As a leading Marxist thinker in the Arab and African spheres, a number of his writings centered on the adaptation of historical materialism to the specific socio-economic formations of Sudan, rejecting the mechanical transposition of Soviet or Chinese industrial models. Although he anchored the party firmly in orthodox Marxism-Leninism, he defended the tactical independence of the SCP against directives from the Communist Party of the Soviet Union. In contrast to strict state atheism, Mahjub argued that Marxism in Sudan had to respect the deeply rooted religious consciousness of the masses, supporting freedom of religion.

He was arrested by the military dictatorship of Ibrahim Abboud in 1959. His trial speech in his own defense, "By virtue of Marxism your honour", served as an assertive political testament outlining the communist program for Sudan. Under Mahjub's leadership, the SCP played an instrumental role in the mass uprisings that overthrew Abboud in 1964.

Operating from orthodox Marxist principles, Mahjub opposed the 1969 coup led by Jaafar Nimeiri. He argued that a military putsch executed by petty-bourgeois officers could not substitute for a genuine democratic and proletarian revolution. This stance put him at odds with the pragmatist wing of his own party, which sought to collaborate with the military junta. Despite Mahjub's reservations, the SCP ultimately participated in Nimeiri's initial government.

=== 1971 coup attempt and execution ===
Mahjub was ideologically opposed to military adventurism and did not orchestrate the 1971 coup attempt led by communist officer Hashem al-Atta on 19 July 1971. Al-Atta seized power for three days before Nimeiri's loyalists violently regained control. Because the coup-makers were aligned with the communist movement, Nimeiri accused the SCP leadership of masterminding the insurgency and ordered a systematic purge of the party.

Mahjub initially refused to flee the country, despite an offer of sanctuary from the East German embassy. He stated that his ontological duty was to remain embedded within the Sudanese working classes to build democracy, a political objective he believed could not be executed from exile. After hiding for four days, Mahjub surrendered to the authorities in a bid to halt the indiscriminate executions of communist cadres. Following a summary military trial, he was sentenced to death.

Mahjub was executed by hanging at Kobar prison in the early hours of Wednesday, 28 July 1971. The execution of its intellectual and organizational leadership severely weakened the Sudanese Communist Party, which never fully regained the hegemonic influence it held during the 1950s and 1960s.

== Writings ==
- New horizons (1956)
- Defense before military courts (1966)
- Rectifying the wrongs in working amongst the masses: report presented to the central committee of the Sudanese Communist Party (1963)
- Socialist schools in Africa (1966)
- Marxism and the quandaries of the Sudanese revolution (1967)
- Marxism and linguistics (n.d.)
- Literature in the age of science (1967)
- On the program (1971)
- The life of Rashed Omer Abdel Khalig Mahgoub (1989)
