= 1969 Sudanese coup d'état =

Military overthrow of President Ismail al-Azhari

- Part of the First Sudanese Civil War and the Arab Cold War
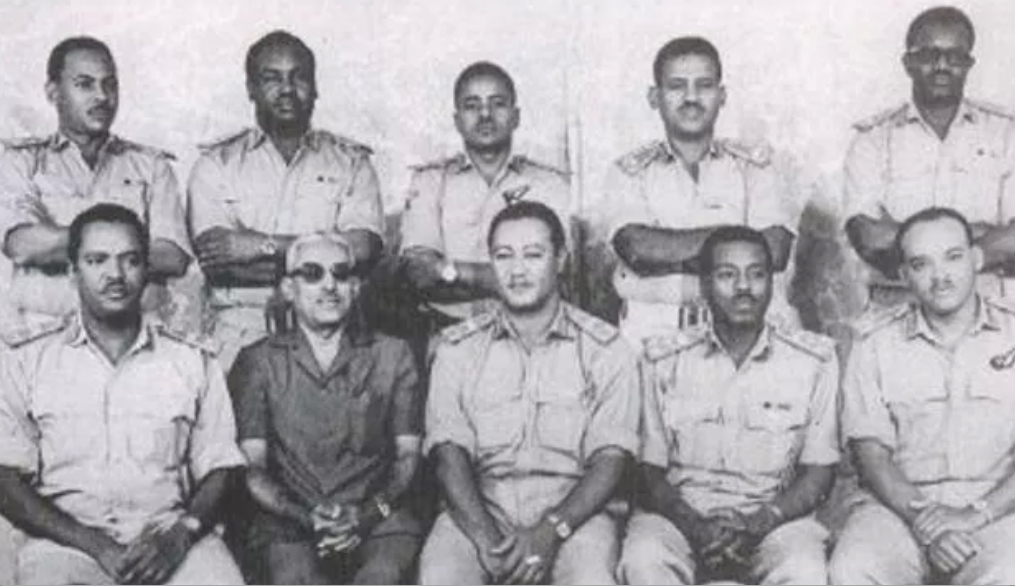
- Members of the National Revolutionary Command Council
Date	25 May 1969
Location	Khartoum-Bahri-Omdurman, Sudan 15.633333°N 32.533333°E
Result	Coup attempt succeeds: Overthrow of democratically elected government; Establishment of National Revolutionary Command Council; Fall of the Republic of Sudan; Formation of the Democratic Republic of the Sudan

Belligerents
Republic of Sudan; Democratic Unionist Party; Umma Party	Sudanese Armed Forces; Free Officers Movement

Commanders and leaders
Ismail al-Azhari; Muhammad Ahmad Mahgoub	Gaafar Nimeiry; Babiker Awadalla; Faruq Hamadallah; Ma'mun Awad Abu Zaid; Khalid Hassan Abbas; Abu al-Qasim Muhammad Ibrahim; Zain al-Abdin Abd al-Qadir
- Location within Sudan.

The government of President Ismail al-Azhari and Prime Minister Muhammad Ahmad Mahgoub of Sudan was overthrown in a bloodless coup d'état on 25 May 1969. The coup ended Sudan's second democratic era.

Led by Colonel Gaafar Nimeiry, the faction of the Sudanese Armed Forces that carried out the coup established a new military government that pursued a program fusing Nasserist Arab nationalism with anti-imperialist state capitalism, forging a tactical "progressive alliance" with the Sudanese Communist Party (SCP) — which interpreted the coup through the Marxist-Leninist theoretical lens of a "national democratic revolution" — that initiated widespread nationalization of private property and foreign banks.

The regime also sought an end to the First Sudanese Civil War, promulgating the historic 9 June 1969 Declaration (architected by Marxist minister Joseph Garang), which officially recognized the cultural differences of the south and declared a policy of regional autonomy.

== Background ==
Following independence on 1 January 1956, Ismail al-Azhari of the National Unionist Party (NUP) became Prime Minister, leading the government alongside the Sudanese Sovereignty Council. However, chronic political instability and sectarian factionalism led to a vote of censure, replacing Azhari with Abdallah Khalil of the Umma Party (UP) in July 1956. During this period, the state apparatus was effectively controlled by an incipient Sudanese bourgeoisie deeply intertwined with traditional religious establishments.

In November 1958, Lt. General Ibrahim Abboud, in collusion with Abdallah Khalil, orchestrated a military self-coup, suspending the constitution, dissolving the parliament, and establishing the Supreme Council of the Armed Forces (SCAF). This resulted in a permanent state of emergency and aggressive policies of Arabization in the southern provinces.

Amid systemic economic resistance and the escalation of the civil war, the October 1964 Revolution emerged, as widespread protests erupted against Abboud's rule. The revolution began with student-led demonstrations in the city of Wad Medani, triggered by the government's decision to increase prices of basic commodities. The protests quickly spread to other cities, including Khartoum, the capital of Sudan. The revolution culminated in Abboud's resignation on 16 November 1964.

An interim government was formed following Abboud's resignation, with the Sudanese Sovereignty Council at the helm and Sirr Al-Khatim Al-Khalifa acting as prime minister. Despite the restoration of parliamentary democracy, structural economic issues remained unresolved. Muhammad Ahmad Mahgoub formed a fragile coalition government in June 1968, aided by Soviet military assistance, but the civilian administration proved incapable of breaking the traditionalist deadlock, leading directly to the 1969 military intervention.

== Coup ==
The military coup, orchestrated by the Free Officers Movement and led by Colonel Gaafar Nimeiry, began early in the morning of 25 May 1969. By 4:00 am, key military and infrastructural installations in the Khartoum-Bahri-Omdurman area had been occupied, and leading Sudanese Army generals were arrested. At 7:00 am, Radio Omdurman broadcast recorded speeches by Nimeiry and Babiker Awadalla, setting out the geopolitical and socialist plans for the new government. Later that morning, Radio Omdurman broadcast the names of the members of the new Council of Ministers, an arrangement that had been secretly negotiated on 23 May in a meeting between Awadalla and the six key officers.

While the core composition of the ruling Revolutionary Command Council (RCC) had been planned in advance, the council's membership was strategically expanded during the course of the day. While his fellow Free Officers were visiting key army units and security organizations to ensure their loyalty to the new regime, Nimeiry met with two members of the Free Officers who had previously voted against the coup at a clandestine meeting in April: Lieutenant Colonel Babikir al-Nur and Major Abu al-Qasim Hashim.

The RCC was headed by Nimeiry and consisted of nine additional members, only one of whom was not in the military: the new prime minister, Babiker Awadalla.

Both officers commanded substantial power bases. Al-Nur was the highest-ranking officer directly associated with the Sudanese Communist Party, representing the orthodox Marxist wing, while Hashim maintained key links with civilian Arab nationalists and Nasserists. Nimeiry, acting unilaterally without consulting the other original plotters, decided to bring both individuals into the new government to broaden its ideological support base. Another officer openly associated with the communist party, Major Hashem al-Atta, was also brought into the new council. Consequently, the newly formed RCC was not composed exclusively of those who had implemented the coup, but integrated representatives of the majority block of the Free Officers Movement that had initially opposed the timing of the insurrection. This tactical integration of orthodox communists and Nasserist nationalists laid the foundation for the deep ideological contradictions that would fracture the regime two years later.

== Sources ==
- Crowder, Michael, ed. (1984). The Cambridge History of Africa. Vol. 8. Cambridge: Cambridge University Press. ISBN 978-0-521-22409-3.
- Niblock, Tim (1987). Class and Power in Sudan: The Dynamics of Sudanese Politics, 1898–1985. London: Palgrave Macmillan. ISBN 978-1-349-08836-2.
- Shillington, Kevin (2005). Encyclopedia of African History. Vol. 1. New York: Fitzroy Dearborn. ISBN 978-1-57958-245-6.
