= 1971 Sudanese coup d'état =

- Part of the First Sudanese Civil War, the Cold War, and the Arab Cold War
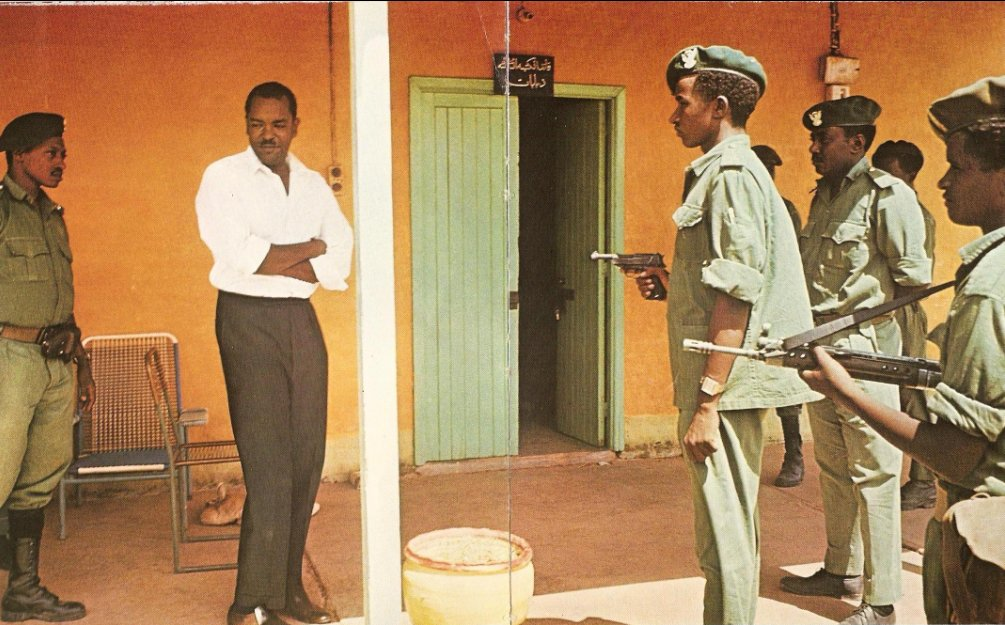
- Hashem al-Atta under arrest on 23 July, following the counter-coup by Nimeiry loyalists.
Date	19–22 July 1971
Location	Khartoum, Sudan 15.633333°N 32.533333°E
Result	Coup attempt fails: Nimeiry restored as head of state; Anti-communist purges by government forces; Execution of rebelling officers and civilian leaders; Consolidation of Nimeiry's authoritarian control

Belligerents
19 July 1971: Democratic Republic of Sudan; (Sudan) National Revolutionary Command Council; Sudanese Armed Forces; 19 July 1971–22 July 1971: Loyalist Nimeiry military units of the Sudanese Armed Forces; Libya	19 July 1971: July Rectification Movement; Sudanese Communist Party (military wing); 19 July 1971–22 July 1971: Democratic Sudan; (Sudan) Revolutionary Council; Sudanese Armed Forces; Sudanese Communist Party (military wing)

Commanders and leaders
(Sudan) Gaafar Nimeiry (Sudan) Khalid Hassan Abbas	Hashem al-Atta (executed); Babikir al-Nur Osman (executed); Farouk Hamadallah (executed); Abdel Khaliq Mahjub (executed); Joseph Garang (executed)
- Location within Sudan.

Major Hashem al-Atta led a coup d'état in Sudan on 19 July 1971 against the government of President Gaafar Nimeiry.

While the coup was led by officers associated with the Sudanese Communist Party (SCP), the party's central committee and its General Secretary, Abdel Khaliq Mahjub, had not given prior approval for the military action. The coup briefly toppled the administration of the Democratic Republic of the Sudan and established a Revolutionary Council.

However, it failed to garner sufficient domestic or regional support. After three days in captivity, Nimeiry loyalists launched a successful counter-coup, freeing the deposed president and dismantling al-Atta's government.

Following his restoration, Nimeiry initiated a sweeping purge of the military, civil service, and the SCP leadership, consolidating absolute authority within the presidency and shifting Sudan's geopolitical alignment away from the Soviet Union.

== Background ==
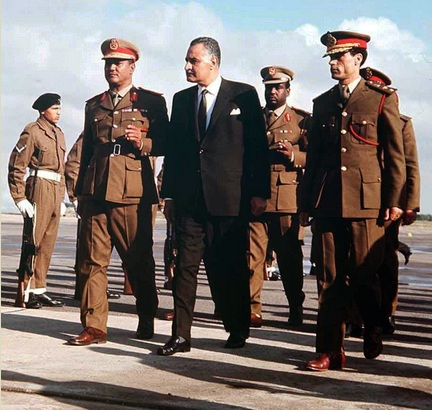
Nimeiry, Nasser, and Gaddafi in Tripoli, 1969

Under the influence of leftist officers who had backed his May 1969 takeover, President Nimeiry initially aligned Sudan with the Soviet Union, reorienting trade toward the Eastern Bloc and nationalizing banks and large business holdings. The Soviets responded by supplying military equipment and advisors to train the Sudanese army.

However, by early 1971, Nimeiry had grown deeply disappointed with the results of this partnership. Soviet manufactured goods were often shoddy and overvalued; for instance, Soviet tires were priced 30% higher than Japanese ones, and earth-moving equipment was 55% more expensive than similar Italian machinery. Additionally, Soviet tractors proved unsuitable for Sudan's hot climate, frequently breaking down.

A central internal fracture between Nimeiry and the left revolved around political organization. Nimeiry demanded that the Sudanese Communist Party (SCP) dissolve itself and integrate into a planned single-party system, the Sudanese Socialist Union (SSU). The orthodox wing of the SCP, led by General Secretary Abdel Khaliq Mahjub, firmly opposed dissolution, advocating instead for a "national democratic front" that would preserve the party's political independence and its hegemony over trade and tenant unions. In contrast, a pragmatist nationalist faction within the party, led by Mu'awiyah Ibrahim, advocated for unconditional cooperation and integration into the military regime.

Following the breakdown of these negotiations, Nimeiry moved decisively against the SCP in February 1971, ordering the arrest of the central committee and banning communist-affiliated mass organizations. In response, communist-aligned officers launched a preemptive strike before the party could be entirely dismantled.

== Events ==
=== The 19 July mutiny and initial takeover ===
The coup began in the mid-afternoon of 19 July 1971, taking advantage of the relative quiet in Khartoum as many Sudanese retired from the scorching sun for the traditional afternoon siesta. Major Hashem al-Atta moved tanks into positions around government buildings, capturing the Presidential Palace and taking Nimeiry and several dozen of his followers prisoner.

Al-Atta immediately declared himself, Colonel Babikir al-Nur Osman, and Major Farouk Hamadallah in charge of the government, proclaiming a new Revolutionary Council. Although the officers denied being communists, their government's first executive act was to lift the ban that Nimeiry had placed on the SCP and its affiliated organizations. In a radio broadcast, al-Atta stated that the new regime would link Sudan more closely with socialist countries and bring communists into a coalition government.

Although it is suspected that Mahjub was likely aware of the coup attempt and failed to prevent it, most members of the SCP’s political bureau and central committee had not previously endorsed al-Atta’s initiative, nor did they participate directly in it.

Initial domestic response was muted; the coup met no immediate resistance from the Sudanese Armed Forces, while communist sympathizers staged pro-coup demonstrations in the capital. However, a significant logistical hurdle remained: al-Atta's co-leaders, al-Nur and Hamadallah, were in London for medical treatment. Upon learning of the coup's success, the two officers prepared to fly home, with al-Nur slated to become the chief of state in the new regime.

=== International intervention and isolation ===
Despite the ease with which al-Atta seized Khartoum, the coup possessed a narrow support base. While the SCP was the Arab world's largest communist party, it commanded the loyalty of only a relatively small element of the country's population. Most Sudanese were devout Muslims who considered communism abhorrent and viewed its supporters as dangerous atheists.

Crucially, the prospect of a communist state on the Red Sea alarmed neighboring powers. In Egypt, President Anwar Sadat sent a fact-finding mission to Khartoum and ordered Egyptian troops stationed south of the capital to resist the coup. Saudi Arabia was similarly distressed by the leftist takeover, though its response remained clandestine.

The most decisive and spectacular intervention came from Muammar Gaddafi's Libya. Virulently anti-communist at the time, Gaddafi rallied to Nimeiry's support by dispatching Libyan fighter planes to intercept the British Airways jetliner on which al-Nur and Hamadallah were returning to Khartoum. Gaddafi had the two men removed from the aircraft and held under arrest.

Conversely, Ba'athist Iraq was the sole Arab government to publicly endorse the coup. Baghdad dispatched an airliner carrying an Iraqi delegation to congratulate al-Atta, but the aircraft exploded and crashed under mysterious circumstances while traversing Saudi airspace, further isolating the rebel government.

=== The counter-coup and collapse ===
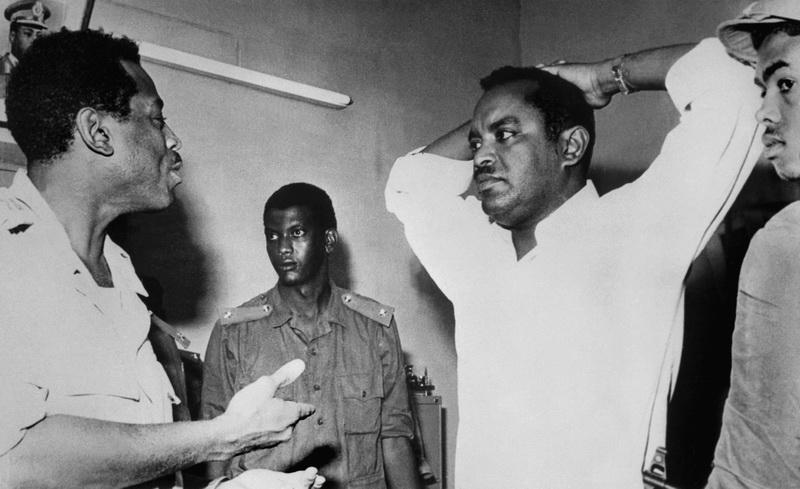
General Babikir al-Nur Osman being interrogated by Defense Minister Khalid Hassan Abbas following his extradition from Libya and the collapse of the coup.

Unaware of Gaddafi's action, al-Atta traveled to the airport on the morning of 22 July expecting to welcome his co-leaders. Recognizing he was on shaky ground, al-Atta had ordered the army to immobilize its tanks in the Khartoum area and locked up the ammunition of soldiers whose loyalty was in doubt, measures reportedly advised by Soviet military attachés.

When al-Atta learned the plane from London would not arrive, he addressed a rally in central Khartoum. His desperate attempt to muster popular support failed; the crowd was thin, he was heckled, and there were calls for Nimeiry's return to power. Within hours, Sudanese army units loyal to Nimeiry moved into Khartoum and freed the president after a brief battle. Reportedly jumping from a window where he was incarcerated to meet his rescuers, Nimeiry regained control.

Gaddafi subsequently extradited al-Nur and Hamadallah to Sudan. All three coup leaders, along with half a dozen others, were summarily executed.

== Results ==
Nimeiry narrowly escaped death and was furious with both the Sudanese communists and the Soviet Union, whom he blamed for the conspiracy, although later investigations suggested Moscow was likely not behind the move. He ruthlessly crushed the Sudanese Communist Party, subjecting its members to wholesale arrests. Beyond the military leaders, the regime executed the core civilian leadership of the Sudanese left, including SCP General Secretary Abdel Khaliq Mahjub, trade unionist Shafie Ahmed el Sheikh, and Minister for Southern Affairs Joseph Garang. The death of Garang ended the party's attempt to resolve the civil war through a class-based approach toward the South.

The coup triggered a permanent shift in Sudan's foreign policy. Nimeiry publicly denounced the Eastern Bloc, with the sole exception of Yugoslavia, and aligned Sudan more closely with the West. Although diplomatic relations with the Soviets remained intact, they became considerably more tense, while relations with the U.S. and other Western European countries improved. Relations with Libya and Egypt also became strained, and the Nimeiry regime sought support from the more conservative states of the Arabian Peninsula, particularly Saudi Arabia, Kuwait, and Abu Dhabi.

A provisional constitution formalized an executive presidential system to replace the RCC, and a plebiscite in October 1971 – where voting conditions did not ensure a secret ballot – elected Nimeiry to a six-year term as president with officially 98.6% of the approximately 4 million votes cast.

== Bibliography ==
- Crowder, Michael, ed. (1984). The Cambridge History of Africa, Volume 8: From c. 1940 to c. 1975. Cambridge: Cambridge University Press. ISBN 978-0521224093.
- Gresh, Alain (1989). "The Free Officers And The Comrades: The Sudanese Communist Party And Nimeiri Face-To-Face, 1969–1971". International Journal of Middle East Studies. 21 (3): 393–409. doi:10.1017/S0020743800032578. ISSN 0020-7438.
- Korn, David A. (1993). Assassination in Khartoum. Bloomington: Indiana University Press. ISBN 978-0253332028.
- Lobban, Richard A. (1992). Historical Dictionary of the Sudan. Metuchen: Scarecrow Press. ISBN 978-0810825475.
- Niblock, Tim (1987). Class and Power in Sudan: The Dynamics of Sudanese Politics, 1898–1985. London: Palgrave Macmillan. ISBN 978-1-349-08836-2.
- Shillington, Kevin (2005). Encyclopedia of African History. Vol. 1. New York: Fitzroy Dearborn. ISBN 978-1-57958-245-6.

=== News sources ===
- "Execute Leaders of Sudan Coup". The Southeast Missourian. Cape Girardeau, Missouri. 23 July 1971.
- The Washington Post (28 July 1971). "Communist Leader Sentenced By Military Court". The Washington Post.
- Hevesi, Dennis (11 June 2009). "Gaafar al-Nimeiry, a Sudan Leader With Shifting Politics, Dies at 79". The New York Times.
- Joffe, Lawrence (5 June 2009). "Jaafar Nimeiri". The Guardian.
- The Telegraph (1 June 2009). "Gaafar al-Nimeiry". The Telegraph.
- Wheeler, Skye (30 May 2009). "Sudan's former president Nimeiri dies". Reuters.
