= Hashem al-Atta =

Sudanese military officer and politician (1936–1971)

- هاشم العطا
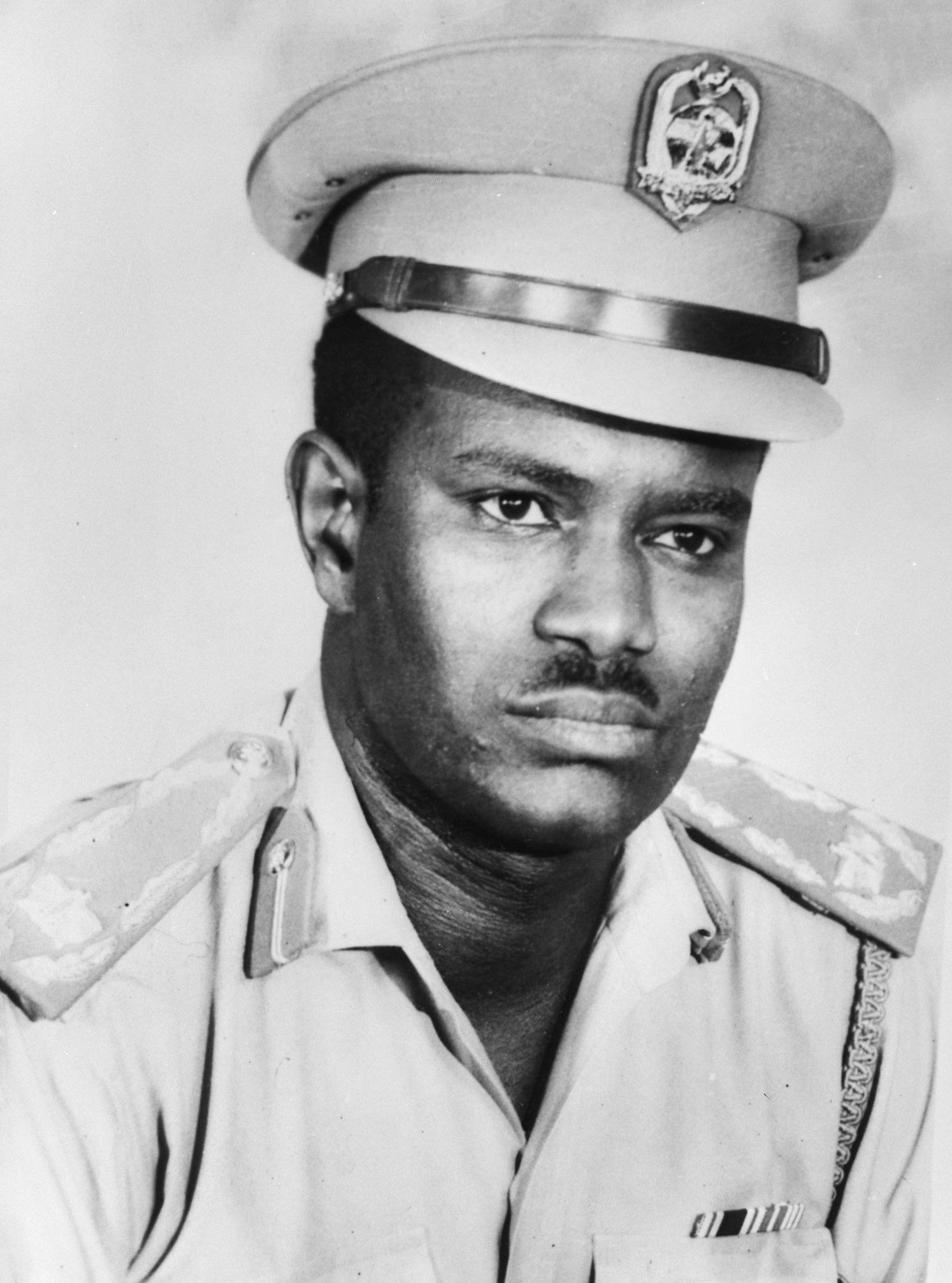
- Hashem al-Atta c. 1971

Vice President of the Revolutionary Council
- In office 19 July 1971 – 22 July 1971
- President: Babakr al Nour
- Preceded by: Babiker Awadalla and Khalid Hassan Abbas (as Deputy Chairmen of the National Revolutionary Command Council)
- Succeeded by: Babiker Awadalla and Khalid Hassan Abbas (as Deputy Chairmen of the National Revolutionary Command Council)

Member of the National Revolutionary Command Council
- In office 25 May 1969 – 16 November 1970

Personal details
- Born: 12 March 1936 Omdurman, Anglo-Egyptian Sudan
- Died: 23 July 1971 (aged 35) Khartoum, Democratic Republic of the Sudan
- Citizenship: Sudanese
- Party: Sudanese Communist Party
- Other political affiliations: July Rectification Movement
- Relations: Yasser al-Atta (nephew)

Military service
- Allegiance: Sudan
- Branch/service: Sudanese Army
- Years of service: 1957–1971
- Rank: Major
- Battles/wars: First Sudanese Civil War; 1971 Sudanese coup d'état

Major Hashem al-Atta (Arabic: هاشم العطا; 12 March 1936 – 23 July 1971) was a Sudanese military officer, politician, and revolutionary. Although he initially served in the National Revolutionary Command Council under Gaafar Nimeiry, he is best known for leading the 1971 Sudanese coup d'état. Operating in strategic alignment with the Sudanese Communist Party (SCP), al-Atta temporarily overthrew Nimeiry to establish a Marxist–Leninist government based on the theoretical framework of a national democratic revolution. The coup was initially successful, but the new revolutionary government collapsed after three days when loyalist military units freed the deposed president. Following the failure of the uprising, al-Atta and the other ringleaders were executed.

== Early life and education ==
Al-Atta was born on 12 March 1936 in Omdurman, in what was then Anglo-Egyptian Sudan. He graduated from high school in 1957 and immediately joined the armed forces, graduating from the Sudanese Military College as a second lieutenant in 1959.

== Military career ==
Al-Atta furthered his military education by studying in the United Kingdom (1962–1963) and West Germany (1963–1964), followed by additional training in the United Arab Republic and the United States in 1965.

He served in the Sudanese Action Central Command from 1959 to 1963, before becoming an instructor at the Sudanese Infantry School from 1963 to 1965. Following this, he was transferred to the Sudanese Army's Southern Command, where he served from 1966 to 1968. He was then appointed as a military attaché at the Sudanese Embassy in Bonn, West Germany, a position he held until 1969.

Following the 1969 coup d'état that brought Nimeiry to power, al-Atta became a member of the ruling National Revolutionary Command Council. He held several posts in the new government, including Assistant Prime Minister with a portfolio directing agriculture. However, amid growing ideological rifts between Nimeiry's nationalist faction and the Marxist wing of the military, al-Atta, alongside Babikir al-Nur and Farouk Hamadallah, was arrested and stripped of all his political and military positions on 16 November 1970.

== 1971 coup d'état and execution ==
The leftist faction of the military responded on the mid-afternoon of 19 July 1971, when al-Atta led a communist-backed mutiny in Khartoum. Moving tanks into position around government buildings, he took Nimeiry and dozens of his followers prisoner. The takeover was swift: al-Atta seized the capital, established a new Revolutionary Command Council, and declared himself Commander-in-Chief of the Armed Forces, Vice President, and Minister of Defense. In a policy statement broadcast over the official radio, he lifted the ban on the SCP and declared that the new regime would link Sudan more closely with the socialist bloc.

Despite the initial ease of the military operation, the new government was quickly beset by regional isolation and lacked popular support among the predominantly devout Muslim population, who viewed the communist ideology with deep suspicion. Sensing extreme vulnerability on the morning of 22 July, al-Atta attempted to preempt a counter-coup by ordering the immobilization of tanks, furloughing armored brigades, and locking up the ammunition of soldiers whose loyalty was in doubt.

Later that morning, al-Atta went to the airport to greet the designated head of state, Babikir al-Nur, and Farouk Hamadallah, who were returning from London. Unaware that their plane had been intercepted by Libyan fighter jets, he waited in vain. Realizing the plane would not arrive, al-Atta went to central Khartoum to address a rally he had organized. Instead of mustering support, he faced a thin crowd, was heckled, and encountered direct calls for Nimeiry's return.

On 23 July, loyalist military units stormed the palace, crushed the rebellion, and freed Nimeiry. Al-Atta was summarily court-martialled, sentenced to death for high treason, and executed by firing squad later that same day.

== Sources ==
=== Academic sources ===
- Korn, David A. (1993). Assassination in Khartoum. Bloomington: Indiana University Press. ISBN 978-0253332028.
- Niblock, Tim (1987). Class and Power in Sudan: The Dynamics of Sudanese Politics, 1898–1985. London: Palgrave Macmillan. ISBN 978-1-349-08836-2.
- Shillington, Kevin (2005). Encyclopedia of African History. Vol. 1. New York: Fitzroy Dearborn. ISBN 978-1-57958-245-6.

=== Press sources ===
- The Southeast Missourian (23 July 1971). "Execute Leaders of Sudan Coup". The Southeast Missourian. Cape Girardeau, Missouri.
- The Telegraph (1 June 2009). "Gaafar al-Nimeiry". The Telegraph.
