= Babiker Awadalla =

Prime Minister of Sudan (1969)

- بابكر عوض الله
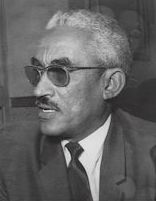
- Awadalla in the 1960s

7th Prime Minister of Sudan
- In office 25 May 1969 – 27 October 1969
- President: Gaafar Nimeiry
- Preceded by: Muhammad Ahmad Mahgoub
- Succeeded by: Gaafar Nimeiry

Chief Justice of Sudan
- In office 1964–1967
- Preceded by: Muhammad Ahmad Abu Rannat

Personal details
- Born: 2 March 1917 Gitena, White Nile, Anglo-Egyptian Sudan
- Died: 17 January 2019 (aged 101) Dublin, Republic of Ireland
- Party: Independent

Babiker Awadalla (Arabic: بابكر عوض الله; 2 March 1917 – 17 January 2019) was a Sudanese politician and Arab nationalist figure who was Prime Minister of Sudan from 25 May 1969 to 27 October 1969.

== Early life and education ==
Awadalla was born in the White Nile State on 2 March 1917. In 1940, he graduated from the Gordon Memorial College law school.

== Career ==
Awadalla held the position of Speaker of the lower house of the Sudanese legislature from 1954 to 1957. In 1964, he provided the drive to start the October Revolution by siding against the military in charge of Sudan. After the revolution, he became Sudan's Chief Justice in 1964. In 1967, Awadalla resigned from his position as Chief Justice in protest of the government's refusal to reinstate the Sudanese Communist Party, which the nation's courts had held to be unconstitutionally banned from parliament.

== Cabinet ==
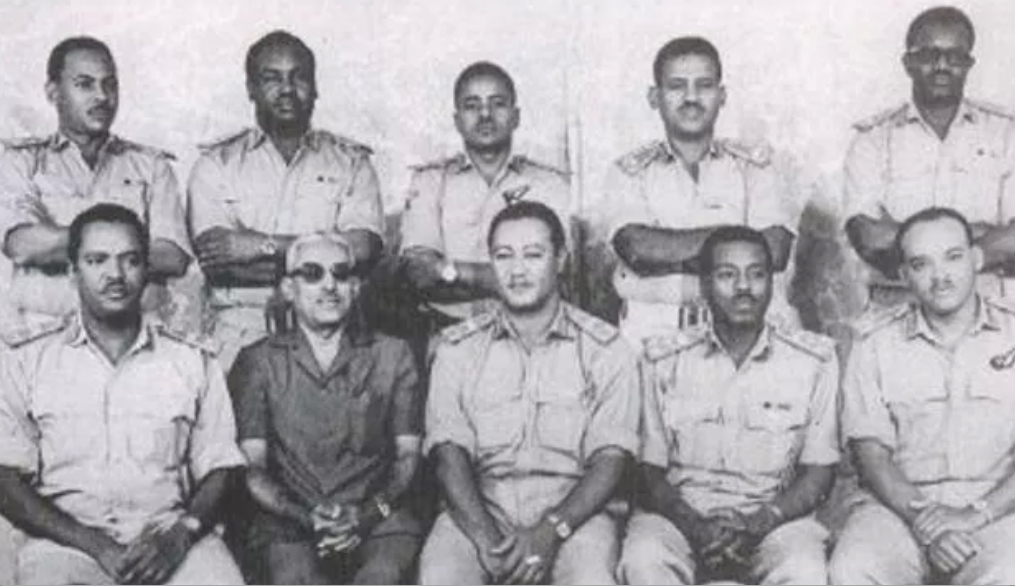
Awadalla with leaders coup of May 1969

Awadalla was part of the coup of May 1969 that started Gaafar Nimeiry's presidency.

In Gaafar Nimeiry's military cabinet, Awadalla was the only civilian member on the National Revolutionary Command Council. Awadalla was selected as both Prime Minister and Foreign Minister on 25 May 1969. His position as Prime Minister ended on 27 October 1969 and he kept his position as Foreign Minister of Sudan until 1971. After finishing his previous positions, Awadalla held the positions of Deputy Prime Minister and Justice Minister in 1971. Next he was Vice President of Sudan from 1972 to 1973.

== United Nations ==
During a General Assembly meeting on 23 September 1969, Awadalla warned that the United States's decision of supporting Israel during the Arab-Israel conflict could provoke the use of nuclear weapons in the Middle East.

== Later life and death ==
After 1972 Awadalla moved to Egypt, and later Dublin, Ireland, where he was reported to be living in May 2017 and became a centenarian in the same year. Awadalla died on 17 January 2019, at the age of 101 of natural causes.

Political offices
Preceded by Muhammad Ahmad Mahgoub	Prime Minister of Sudan 1969	Succeeded by Gaafar Nimeiry
