= Gaafar Nimeiry =

Sudanese president and military officer (1931–2009)

Field Marshal Gaafar Muhammad an-Nimeiry
- جعفر محمد النميري
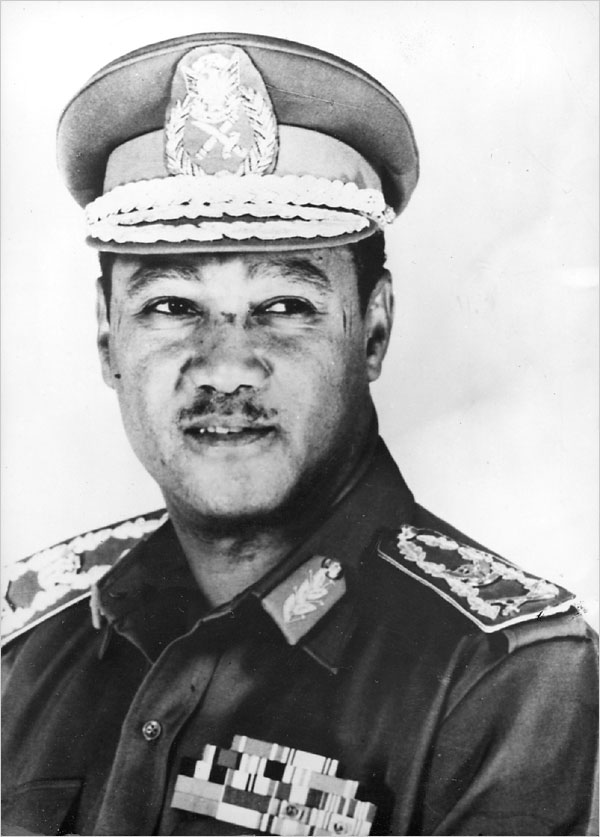
- Nimeiry in 1974

Chairman of the National Revolutionary Command Council
- In office 25 May 1969 – 19 July 1971
- Deputy: Babiker Awadalla (first) and Khalid Hassan Abbas (second)
- Preceded by: Ismail al-Azhari (as Chairman of the Sovereignty Council)
- Succeeded by: Babikir al-Nur Osman (as President of the RC)
- In office 22 July 1971 – 12 October 1971
- Deputy: Babiker Awadalla (first) and Khalid Hassan Abbas (second)
- Preceded by: Babikir al-Nur Osman (as President of the RC)
- Succeeded by: Himself (as President)

2nd President of Sudan
- In office 12 October 1971 – 6 April 1985
- Vice President: First Vice Presidents; Abel Alier; Mohamed Al-Baghir Ahmed; Abu el-Qassim Mohamad Ibrahim; Abdul Majid Hamid Khalil; Omar Muhammad al-Tayib
- Preceded by: Himself as Chairman of the RCC
- Succeeded by: Abdel Rahman Swar al-Dahab

8th Prime Minister of Sudan
- In office 28 October 1969 – 19 July 1971
- President: Himself
- Preceded by: Babiker Awadalla
- Succeeded by: Vacant
- In office 23 July 1971 – 11 August 1976
- President: Himself
- Preceded by: Vacant
- Succeeded by: Rashid Bakr
- In office 10 September 1977 – 6 April 1985
- President: Himself
- Preceded by: Rashid Bakr
- Succeeded by: Al-Jazuli Daf'allah

Personal details
- Born: 1 January 1930 Wad Nubawi, Omdurman, Anglo-Egyptian Sudan
- Died: 30 May 2009 (aged 79) Omdurman, Sudan
- Party: Sudanese Socialist Union (while in power); Alliance of the Peoples' Working Forces (after return from exile)

Military service
- Allegiance: Sudan
- Branch/service: Sudanese Army
- Years of service: 1952–1985
- Rank: Field Marshal
- Commands: Sudanese Armed Forces
- Battles/wars: First Sudanese Civil War; Second Sudanese Civil War

Gaafar Muhammad an-Nimeiry (also spelled Jaafar Nimeiry, or Ja'far Muhammad Numayri; Arabic: جعفر محمد النميري, romanized: Jaʿfar Muḥammad an-Numayrī; 1 January 1930 – 30 May 2009) was a Sudanese military officer, politician, and revolutionary who served as the head of state of Sudan from 1969 to 1985, first as Chairman of the National Revolutionary Command Council and then as President.

A devout Muslim and military officer, Nimeiry came to power after leading a military coup in 1969. He established a one-party state, with his Sudanese Socialist Union (SSU) acting as the sole legal political entity. He began his rule as a left-wing admirer of Egyptian President Gamal Abdel Nasser, pursuing socialist and Pan-Arabist policies. However, after surviving a communist-backed coup attempt in 1971 – with the crucial intervention of Libya's Muammar Gaddafi – Nimeiry systematically smashed both leftist and religious insurrections. He drastically shifted his policies to the right, breaking ties with the Soviet Union to forge new relations with Mao Zedong's China and ultimately becoming a close ally of the United States.

In 1972, Nimeiry signed the Addis Ababa Agreement, ending the First Sudanese Civil War and granting autonomy to the south. During his last years in power, he shifted toward Islamism, allying with the Muslim Brotherhood. In 1983, he controversially imposed Sharia law throughout the entire country, which triggered the Second Sudanese Civil War. Amid a severe economic crisis and widespread civil disobedience, he was ousted from power in 1985 and went into exile in Egypt. He returned to Sudan in 1999 and unsuccessfully ran in the 2000 presidential elections.

== Early life and education ==
Nimeiry was educated at the Omdurman primary and elementary school, then at the Wad Madani secondary school, and finally at the Hantub school, which had a British colonial character. He briefly studied at Khartoum University College before pursuing a military career. He graduated from the War College in Omdurman in 1952. He later earned a Master of Military Science from the United States Army Command and General Staff College in Fort Leavenworth, Kansas, in 1966.

Rising through the ranks of the Sudanese Army, Nimeiry was frequently suspected of anti-government plotting. He was accused of orchestrating a coup d'état in 1957, but insufficient evidence prevented a conviction. He was interrogated again regarding a failed coup led by Khalid Yusuf, but was cleared. On 28 December 1966, following another abortive coup by junior communist officers targeting the presidential palace, Nimeiry – then commanding the Eastern Command – was among the 400 individuals arrested. He was released on 9 January 1967 and subsequently assigned to command the infantry school.

== Presidency (1969–1985) ==
=== Leftist phase and the RCC (1969–1971) ===
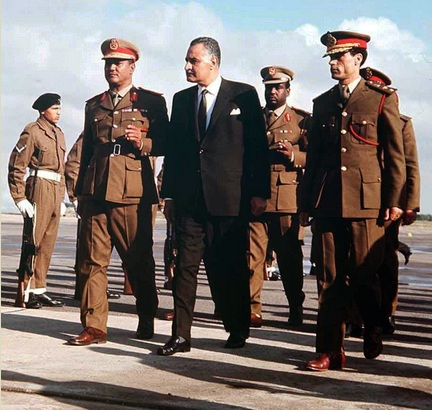
Nimeiry, Nasser, and Gaddafi in Tripoli, 1969

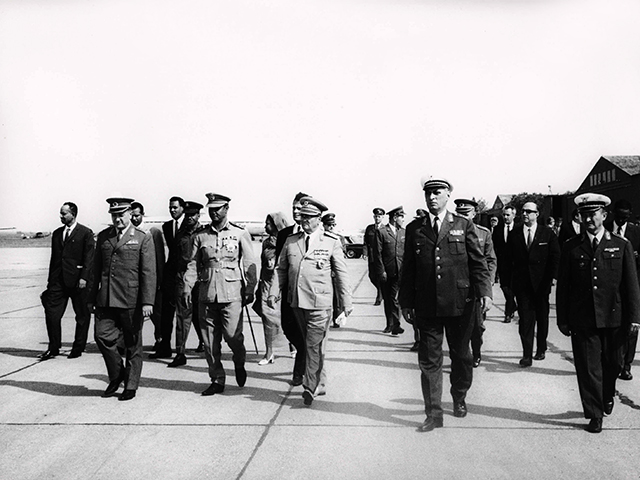
Nimeiry with Marshal Tito in 1970

On 25 May 1969, Colonel Nimeiry, commanding the Khartoum Garrison, partnered with other Free Officers to overthrow the civilian government of Ismail al-Azhari. Termed the "May Revolution", the coup was timed opportunely, as the 14 senior-most officers of the Sudanese Armed Forces were out of the country. Within the Free Officers movement, a majority of the leadership had initially rejected the timing of a takeover. However, Nimeiry and a minority faction of five officers pre-empted the broader organization and executed the coup, partnering with civilian politician Babiker Awadalla. The next day, Nimeiry suspended the constitution, dissolved the National Assembly and all political parties, and established himself as Chairman of the Revolutionary Command Council (RCC). He promoted himself to major-general and extensively purged the military's upper echelons.

Initially, Nimeiry aligned heavily with the left. He appointed himself prime minister in October 1969 and launched an economic campaign marked by sweeping land reforms. In May and June 1970, Nimeiry enacted extensive nationalizations of the banking sector, foreign-owned businesses, and domestic trading companies to consolidate state authority over the economy. To neutralize conservative opposition, Nimeiry ordered an aerial bombardment on Aba Island in March 1970. Approximately 4,000 troops and tanks, supported by the air force, stormed the island, killing thousands of Ansar followers and their leader, Imam Al-Hadi al-Mahdi.

=== Western pivot and Addis Ababa Agreement (1971–1979) ===
Nimeiry's alliance with the left abruptly ended following the 1971 communist-backed coup attempt. Although briefly ousted, Nimeiry was restored to power by loyalist troops with decisive military assistance from Libya's Muammar Gaddafi, who sent fighter aircraft to force down a British Airways jetliner carrying two of the coup's leaders, Babakr al-Nur Osman and Faruk Hamadallah, and held them for extradition to Sudan. Reportedly jumping from a window where he was incarcerated to meet his rescuers, Nimeiry regained control. Following the collapse of the coup, Nimeiry executed the central civilian leadership of the Sudanese left.

He shifted Sudan's geopolitical alignment away from the Soviet Union, pivoting toward the United States, China, and conservative Arab states such as Saudi Arabia and Kuwait. In 1972, China began training the Sudanese army, supplying Shenyang J-6 fighter aircraft, and funding massive infrastructure projects.

Also in 1972, Nimeiry achieved his greatest diplomatic success by signing the Addis Ababa Agreement. The treaty granted autonomy to the non-Muslim southern region, effectively ending the First Sudanese Civil War and ushering in an 11-year period of stability. The peace process was facilitated by the consolidation of the fragmented Anya-Nya insurgency under the unified command of Joseph Lagu.

Economically, Nimeiry transitioned toward capitalist policies. Emphasizing large-scale agricultural and infrastructural development, Nimeiry envisioned Sudan as the "breadbasket of the Arab world," leveraging Arab oil capital and Western technology. This period saw the initiation of the Kenana sugar scheme and oil exploration by Chevron starting in 1974. However, deficient planning, corruption, and the systemic shocks of the 1970s oil crisis led to massive external debt, forcing the government into IMF stabilization programs that mandated privatization and the removal of basic subsidies.

=== Armed rebellions and National Reconciliation (1975–1979) ===
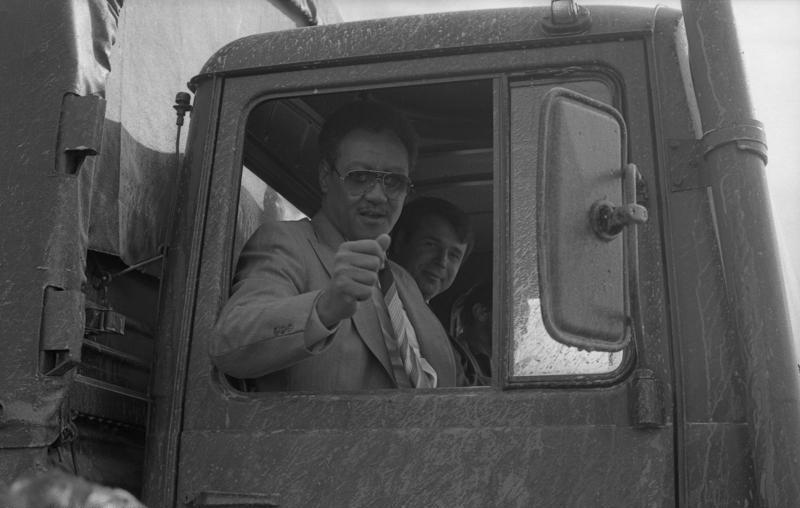
Nimeiry during a 1978 state visit to West Germany, testing army trucks

Despite achieving peace in the south, Nimeiry faced constant threats from northern political factions. In September 1975, a military coup led by Brigadier Hassan Hussein Osman briefly seized power before being swiftly crushed by loyalist forces under Nimeiry's deputy, General Mohamed al-Baghir Ahmed. Osman and other mutineers were subsequently court-martialled and executed.

The following year, a much larger threat emerged. In July 1976, an insurgent force of one thousand fighters, armed and trained by Libya and directed by Umma Party leader Sadiq al-Mahdi, crossed the border from Ma'tan as-Sarra. The insurgents engaged in three days of intense house-to-house fighting in Khartoum and Omdurman that killed some 3,000 people. Nimeiry's government was narrowly saved after a column of army tanks entered the city and neutralized the rebels. Ninety-eight people implicated in the plot were summarily executed, drawing worldwide criticism.

To stabilize his regime after these violent incursions, Nimeiry initiated a "National Reconciliation" in 1977 with Sadiq al-Mahdi and exiled Islamist leaders. The prominent Islamist Hassan al-Turabi of the Muslim Brotherhood was invited back to Sudan, subsequently becoming Justice Minister and Attorney General in 1979. This political realignment gradually marginalized secular and southern political forces.

=== Islamization and the Second Civil War (1980–1985) ===
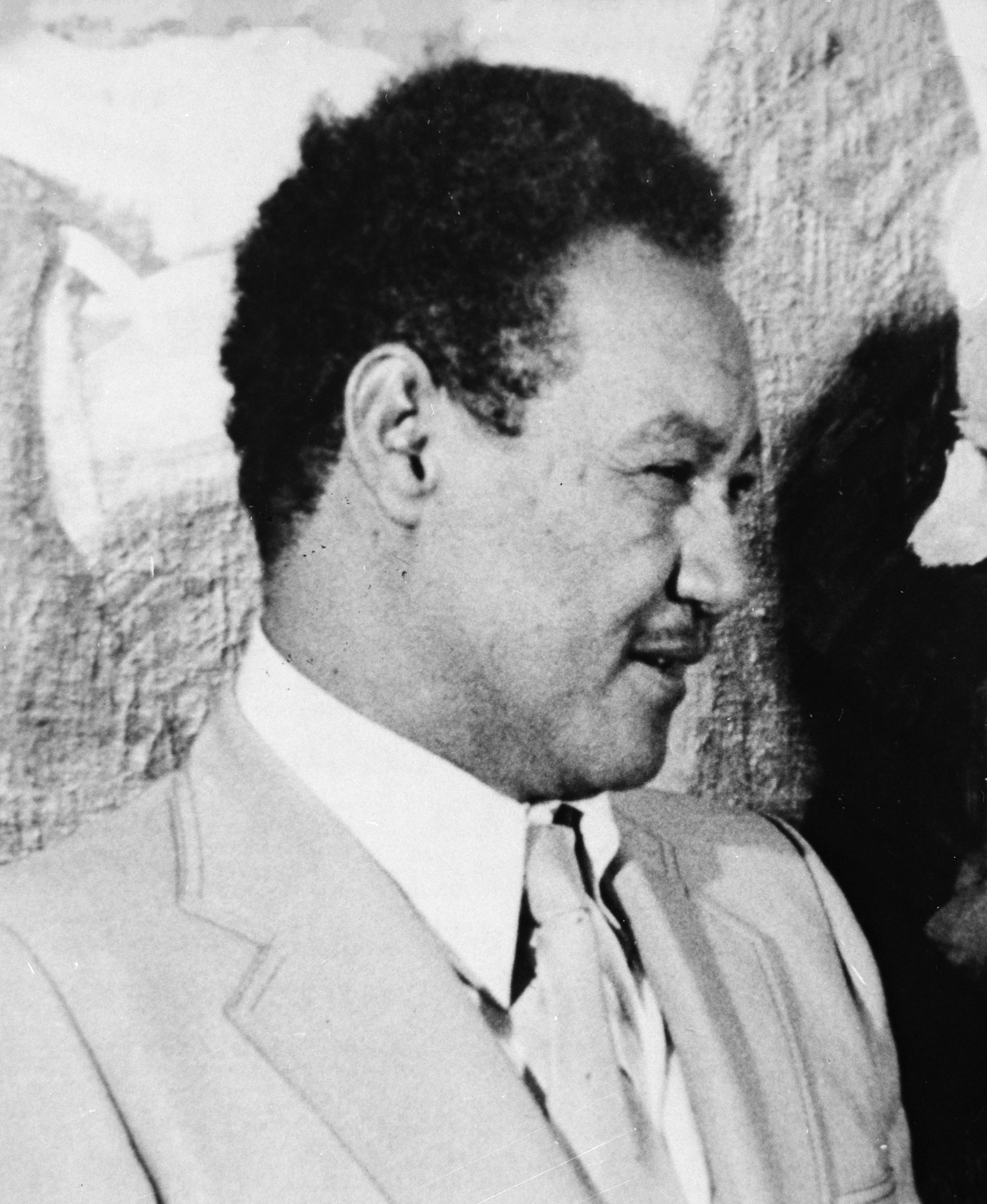
Nimeiry in 1981

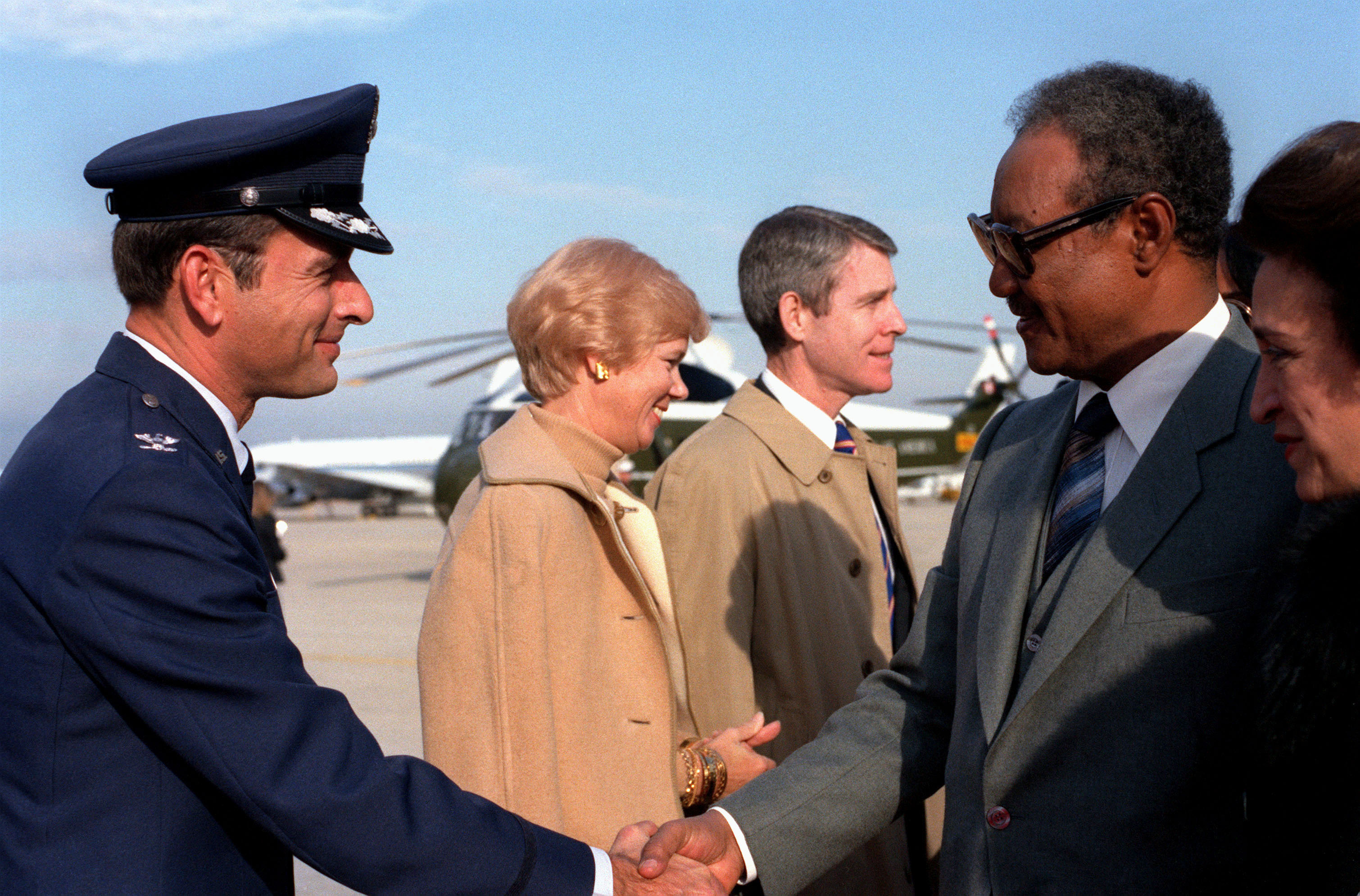
Nimeiry arriving for a state visit in the US, 1983

Faced with economic failure and political disintegration, Nimeiry sought an alternative basis of legitimacy. Pressured by his new Islamist allies, Nimeiry declared an "Islamic revolution" in September 1983, unilaterally imposing Sharia law across the entire country (the "September Laws"). Additionally, he attempted to have himself declared Imam of the Sudanese ummah, but failed. To demonstrate his commitment, he ceremonially dumped $11 million worth of alcohol into the Nile.

The imposition of Islamic penal codes on the predominantly Christian and animist south violated the Addis Ababa Agreement. Nimeiry exacerbated the crisis by officially dissolving the southern autonomous government and subdividing the region, instantly reigniting the Second Sudanese Civil War against the Sudan People's Liberation Army (SPLA) led by John Garang.

In 1984, he declared a state of emergency, granting special powers to the military. His regime became increasingly draconian, highlighted by the January 1985 execution of the peaceful Islamic reformist Mahmoud Mohammed Taha on charges of apostasy. Nevertheless, Nimeiry maintained strong backing from the Ronald Reagan administration. US aid increased to $254 million by 1985, financing the construction of rapid deployment bases and a CIA listening station near Port Sudan. Sudan's strategic value to Washington was further elevated by Nimeiry's covert cooperation in facilitating the evacuation of Ethiopian Falasha Jews to Israel via Khartoum, a role that earned him additional financial support from the United States.

=== The 1985 Revolution and overthrow ===
By 1985, Nimeiry had alienated nearly every sector of Sudanese society. The economy had ground to a halt; between 1980 and 1985, the Sudanese pound lost 80 percent of its value due to hyperinflation. Daily life was paralyzed by long queues for petrol and other basic commodities, while the government struggled with a mounting foreign debt of $9 billion. This economic collapse was compounded by a devastating regional drought and an influx of refugees from neighboring countries.

An IMF-mandated austerity program triggered severe price hikes, including a 75 percent increase in the cost of petrol, alongside rises in bread and sugar prices. The price increases, coupled with the outrage over the execution of the liberal theologian Mahmoud Mohammed Taha, triggered a massive wave of civil disobedience. Trade unions representing doctors, lawyers, and university lecturers organized massive demonstrations and declared a general political strike on 3 April, paralyzing the capital.

On 6 April 1985, while Nimeiry was in Washington, D.C., seeking further financial aid, his own defense minister, General Abdel Rahman Swar al-Dahab, executed a bloodless military coup. The mass protests that facilitated the coup became known as the 1985 Revolution, ending Nimeiry's 16-year rule.

== Exile, return and death ==
Nimeiry lived in exile in Egypt from 1985 to 1999, residing in a villa in Heliopolis, Cairo. He returned to Sudan in May 1999, receiving a rapturous welcome that surprised many of his detractors. The following year, he ran in the presidential election against the incumbent dictator Omar al-Bashir. He performed poorly, obtaining only 9.6% of the votes in an election heavily boycotted by the opposition and widely alleged to be rigged. In 2005, Nimeiry's party, the Alliance of the Peoples' Working Forces, signed a merger agreement with Bashir's ruling National Congress Party.

Nimeiry died of natural causes at his home in Omdurman on 30 May 2009. Tens of thousands of Sudanese citizens, including members of political factions that had historically opposed his rule, attended his official funeral.

Following his death, splits emerged among his supporters regarding the partnership with the National Congress Party. Splinter groups formed the May Socialist Union and the Sudanese Socialist Democratic Union Party, the latter led by Fatima Abdel Mahmoud, who became the first Sudanese woman to contest the presidency in the 2010 elections.

== Bibliography ==
=== Publications ===
- Bechtold, Peter K. (1975). "Military Rule in the Sudan: The First Five Years of Ja'far Numayrī". Middle East Journal. 29 (1). Middle East Institute: 16–32. ISSN 0026-3141. JSTOR 4325326.
- Burr, J. Millard; Collins, Robert O. (2006). Darfur: The Long Road to Disaster. Princeton: Markus Wiener Publishers. ISBN 1-55876-405-4.
- Diana Childress (2010). Omar Al-Bashir's Sudan. Twenty-First Century Books. ISBN 978-0-8225-9096-5.
- Crowder, Michael, ed. (1984). The Cambridge History of Africa, Volume 8: From c. 1940 to c. 1975. Cambridge University Press. ISBN 978-0521224093.
- Debeche, Ismail (1987). The role of China in international relations: the impact of ideology on foreign policy with special reference to Sino-African relations (1949-1986) (PhD). University of York.
- Jessup, John E. (1998). An Encyclopedic Dictionary of Conflict and Conflict Resolution, 1945-1996. Greenwood Publishing Group. ISBN 9780313281129.
- Korn, David A. (1993). Assassination in Khartoum. Bloomington: Indiana University Press. ISBN 978-0253332028.
- Lentz, Harris M. (4 February 2014). Heads of States and Governments Since 1945. Routledge. ISBN 9781134264902.
- Lobban, Richard A. (1992). Historical Dictionary of the Sudan. Metuchen: Scarecrow Press. ISBN 978-0810825475.
- Meredith, Martin (2005). The fate of Africa : from the hopes of freedom to the heart of despair : a history of fifty years of independence. New York: Public Affairs. ISBN 1-58648-246-7.
- Niblock, Tim (1987). Class and Power in Sudan: The Dynamics of Sudanese Politics, 1898–1985. London: Palgrave Macmillan. ISBN 978-1-349-08836-2.
- O'Ballance, Edgar (1977). The Secret War in the Sudan: 1955–1972. London: Faber and Faber. ISBN 0-571-10768-0.
- Shillington, Kevin (2005). Encyclopedia of African History. Vol. 1. New York: Fitzroy Dearborn. ISBN 978-1-57958-245-6.
- Warburg, Gabriel R. (1990). "The Sharia in Sudan: Implementation and Repercussions, 1983-1989". Middle East Journal. 44 (4): 624–637. ISSN 0026-3141.
- Who's who in Africa: The Political, Military and Business Leaders of Africa. African Development. 1973. ISBN 978-0-9502755-0-5.

=== News sources ===
- Hevesi, Dennis (11 June 2009). "Gaafar al-Nimeiry, a Sudan Leader With Shifting Politics, Dies at 79". The New York Times.
- Joffe, Lawrence (5 June 2009). "Jaafar Nimeiri". The Guardian.
- The Telegraph (1 June 2009). "Gaafar al-Nimeiry". The Telegraph.
- Wheeler, Skye (30 May 2009). "Sudan's former president Nimeiri dies". Reuters.
