= September Laws =

September laws may refer to:

- The September 1835 laws during the July Monarchy
- September Laws, 1983 sharia laws in Sudan
