= Islamism in Sudan =

The Islamist movement in Sudan started in universities and high schools as early as the 1940s under the influence of the Egyptian Muslim Brotherhood. The Islamic Liberation Movement, a precursor of the Sudanese Muslim Brotherhood, began in 1949. Hassan Al-Turabi then took control of it under the name of the Sudanese Muslim Brotherhood. In 1964, he became secretary-general of the Islamic Charter Front (ICF), an activist movement that served as the political arm of the Muslim Brotherhood. Other Islamist groups in Sudan included the Front of the Islamic Pact and the Party of the Islamic Bloc.

As of 2011, Al-Turabi, who created the Islamist Popular Congress Party, had been the leader of Islamists in Sudan for the last half century. Al-Turabi's philosophy drew selectively from Sudanese, Islamic, and Western political thought to fashion an ideology for the pursuit of power. Al-Turabi supported sharia and the concept of an Islamic state, but his vision was not Wahhabi or Salafi. He appreciated that the majority of Sudanese followed Sufi Islam, which he set out to change with new ideas. He did not extend legitimacy to Sufis, Mahdists, and clerics, whom he saw as incapable of addressing the challenges of modern life. One of the strengths of his vision was to consider different trends in Islam. Although the political base for his ideas was probably relatively small, he had an important influence on Sudanese politics and religion.

Following the 2018–2019 Sudanese Revolution and 2019 coup, the future of Islamism in Sudan was in question.

== History ==
=== Early years: al-Mirghani and al-Mahdi rivalry ===
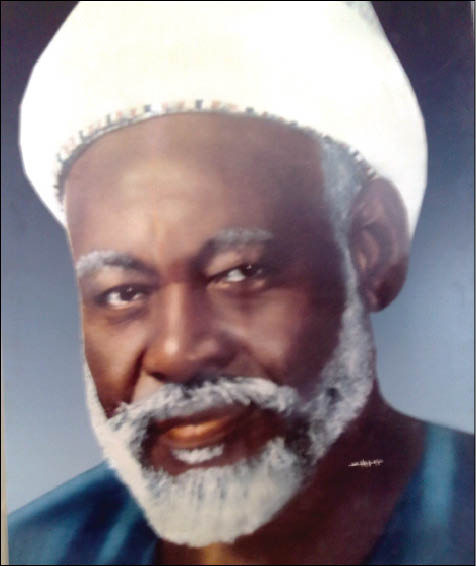
Abd al-Rahman al-Mahdi, the face of Islam in Sudan before Sudan' independence

Under the Turco-Egyptian rule, Sudan saw the rise of politically driven religious movements. This was highlighted by the Mahdist Uprising in 1843, led by Muhammad Ahmad against the Turco-Egyptian rule. After liberating Khartoum and killing General Charles Gordon, the Mahdist state was established in 1885. Despite its defeat by British forces in 1899, the movement's influence persisted with its followers known as "Ansar" and later, in February 1945, forming the "Umma" Party by Abd al-Rahman al-Mahdi to advocate for Sudan's independence from Anglo-Egyptian rule.

Conversely, during the Turco-Egyptian rule in Sudan, the "Khatmiyyah," established by Muhammad Othman al-Mirghani al-Khitmi in 1817, received support. It remained influential during the British occupation and served as a rival to the Ansar movement. In 1943, the Khatmiyyah leader backed the "brothers" movement and the Unity of the Nile Valley movement, advocating for Sudan's autonomy within a united structure with Egypt, which later became the "National Unionist Party (NUP)." despite Khatmiyyah still receiving an annual British endowment, the British, concerned about Khatmiyyah's growing political influence, have sought to counteract this by bolstering the political position of Abd al-Rahman al-Mahdi. The Khatmiyyah split from the NUP in June 1956 to form "The People's Democratic Party," which eventually merged with the Democratic Unionist Party in December 1967.

=== Muslim Brotherhood in Sudan (1954–1964) ===
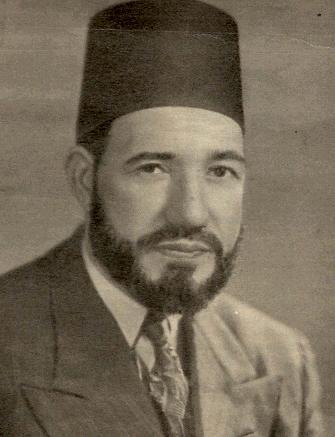
Hassan al-Banna, founder of the Muslim Brotherhood

The Muslim Brotherhood's presence in Sudan was initiated by Jamal al-Din al-Sanhuri in 1946. By 1948, the organisation had grown to include fifty branches in Sudan. However, the British authorities denied the group permission to operate.

In 1949, the "Islamic Liberation Movement" emerged at Gordon Memorial College, aiming to counter communist influence among students. Despite ideological similarities with the Egyptian Muslim Brotherhood, the movement distanced itself from it. The Eid Conference of August 1954 resolved leadership conflicts, leading to the adoption of the name "The Muslim Brotherhood" for the movement in Sudan. This decision caused divisions, resulting in the formation of the Islamic Group in 1954 and the Islamic Socialist Party in 1964.

The Muslim Brotherhood's political engagement increased in December 1955, leading to the establishment of the "Islamic Front for the Constitution." The front advocated for an Islamic constitution after independence.

In 1959, Al-Rashid al-Taher, a leader of the Sudanese Brotherhood, was arrested for alleged involvement in the 1959 coup attempt. His removal led to a decline in the group's activities. Meanwhile, the Islamic Group and the Islamic Socialist Party faced limited success. Babikr Karar's ideas, which aimed to reconcile Islam, socialism, and Arab nationalism, did not gain significant attention. After the 1969 Numeiri coup, Karar relocated to Libya following the September Al-Fateh Revolution. His later attempts to revive the experiment achieved limited success.

=== Islamic Charter Front (1964–1969) ===
Hassan al-Turabi, a professor of constitutional law at the University of Khartoum, rose to prominence during the October 1964 revolution. He then founded the "Islamic Charter Front," which aimed to establish an Islamic constitution and united several Islamic groups. The Front won seven seats in the 1965 elections but saw a decrease in the 1968 elections. Al-Turabi expanded the Front's membership and turned it into a pressure group that led to the banning of the Sudanese Communist Party in November 1965. After his election as Attorney General in April 1969, some members left the group due to his political approach. However, this split remained inactive due to the coup by Nimeiri and the subsequent Mayo regime.

==== National Reconciliation ====
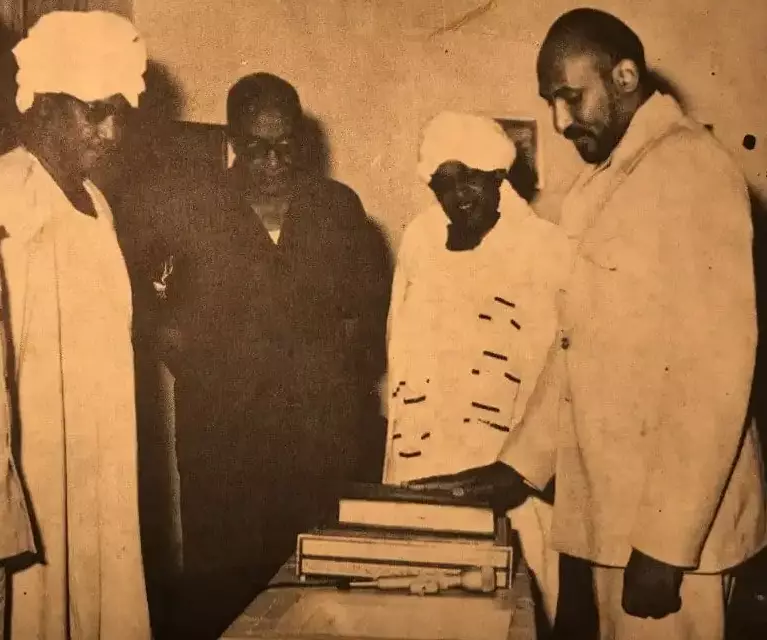
Sadiq al-Mahdi sworn into the government after the 1977 National Reconciliation

Following a failed coup attempt in June 1976, Gaafar Nimeiry sought "national reconciliation" and integrated Al-Sadiq al-Mahdi and Al-Turabi into the Sudanese Socialist Union's political bureau. Al-Turabi became Attorney General in 1979. Al-Turabi saw the rebuilding of the organisation after the coup and exile as a strategic choice. He also took advantage of Nimeiri's suppression of the communists after their 1971 coup attempt.

In 1979, a disagreement between the Sudanese Brotherhood and the parent organisation led to a split. Al-Turabi refused to pledge allegiance to the international group, and Sheikh Sadiq and his followers sided with him. Al-Turabi named his faction the "Sudanese Islamic Movement".

Al-Turabi's influence reached its height when Nimeiri implemented Sharia laws in September 1983, a move Al-Turabi supported. Al-Turabi and his allies within the regime opposed self-rule in the south, a secular constitution, and the acceptance of non-Islamic culture. A condition for national reconciliation was to reconsider the 1972 Addis Ababa Agreement that granted self-governance to the south.

==== Sharia laws ====
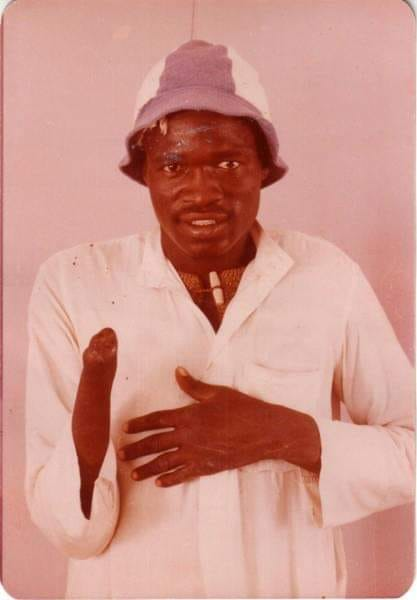
Garang Deng Bol

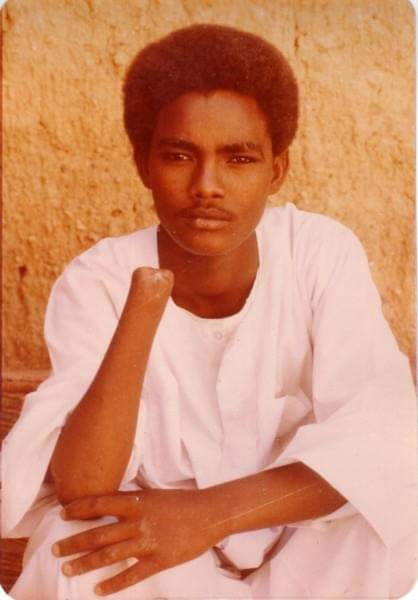
Abdul Rahman Ali

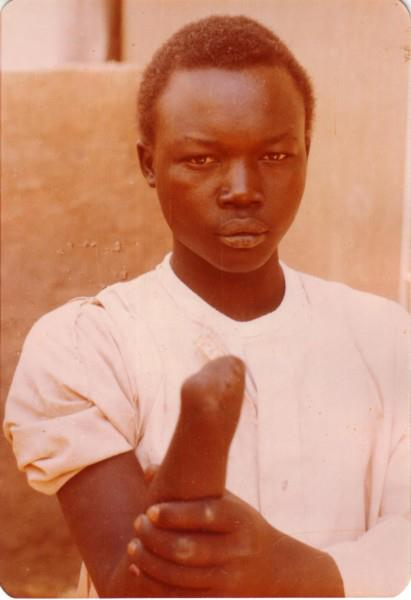
Idris Al-Nur Koko

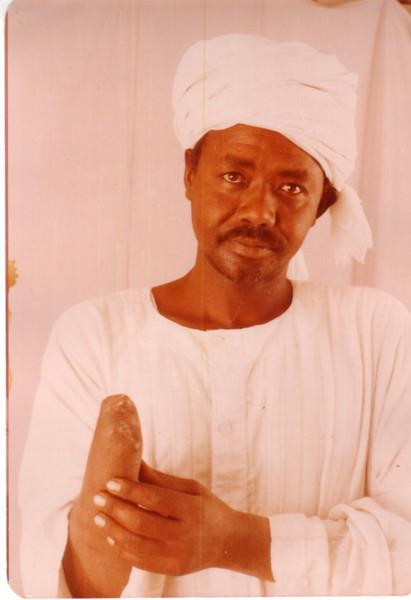
Al-Amin Kabashi

Some of the victims of the September 1983 Laws after amputation according to Sharia law taken by Peter Anton von Arnim in 1986

In September 1983, President Jaafar Nimeiri introduced sharia law in Sudan, known as September 1983 laws, symbolically disposing of alcohol and implementing hudud punishments like public amputations. The Islamic economy followed in early 1984, eliminating interest and instituting zakat. Nimeiri declared himself the imam of the Sudanese Umma in 1984.

Nimeiri's attempt at implementing an "Islamic path" in Sudan from 1977 to 1985, including aligning with religious factions, ultimately failed. His transition from nationalist leftist ideologies to strict Islam was detailed in his books "Al-Nahj al-Islami limadha?" and "Al-Nahj al-Islami kayfa?" The connection between Islamic revival and reconciling with opponents of the 1969 revolution coincided with the rise of militant Islam in other parts of the world. Nimeiri's association with the Abu Qurun Sufi order influenced his shift towards Islam, leading him to appoint followers of the order into significant roles. The process of legislating the "Islamic path" began in 1983, culminating in the enactment of various orders and acts to implement sharia law and other Islamic principles.

Nimeiri's establishment of the Islamic state in Sudan was outlined in his speech at a 1984 Islamic conference. He justified the implementation of the sharia due to a rising crime rate. He claimed a reduction of crime by over 40% within a year due to the new punishments. Nimeiri attributed Sudan's economic success to the zakat and taxation act, outlining its benefits for the poor and non-Muslims. His association with the Abu Qurun Sufi order and his self-proclaimed position as imam led to his belief that he alone could interpret laws in line with the sharia. However, his economic policies, including Islamic banking, led to severe economic issues. Nimeiri's collaboration with the Muslim Brotherhood and the Ansar aimed to end sectarian divisions and implement the sharia. The Ansar, despite initial collaboration, criticised Nimeiri's implementation as un-Islamic and corrupt.

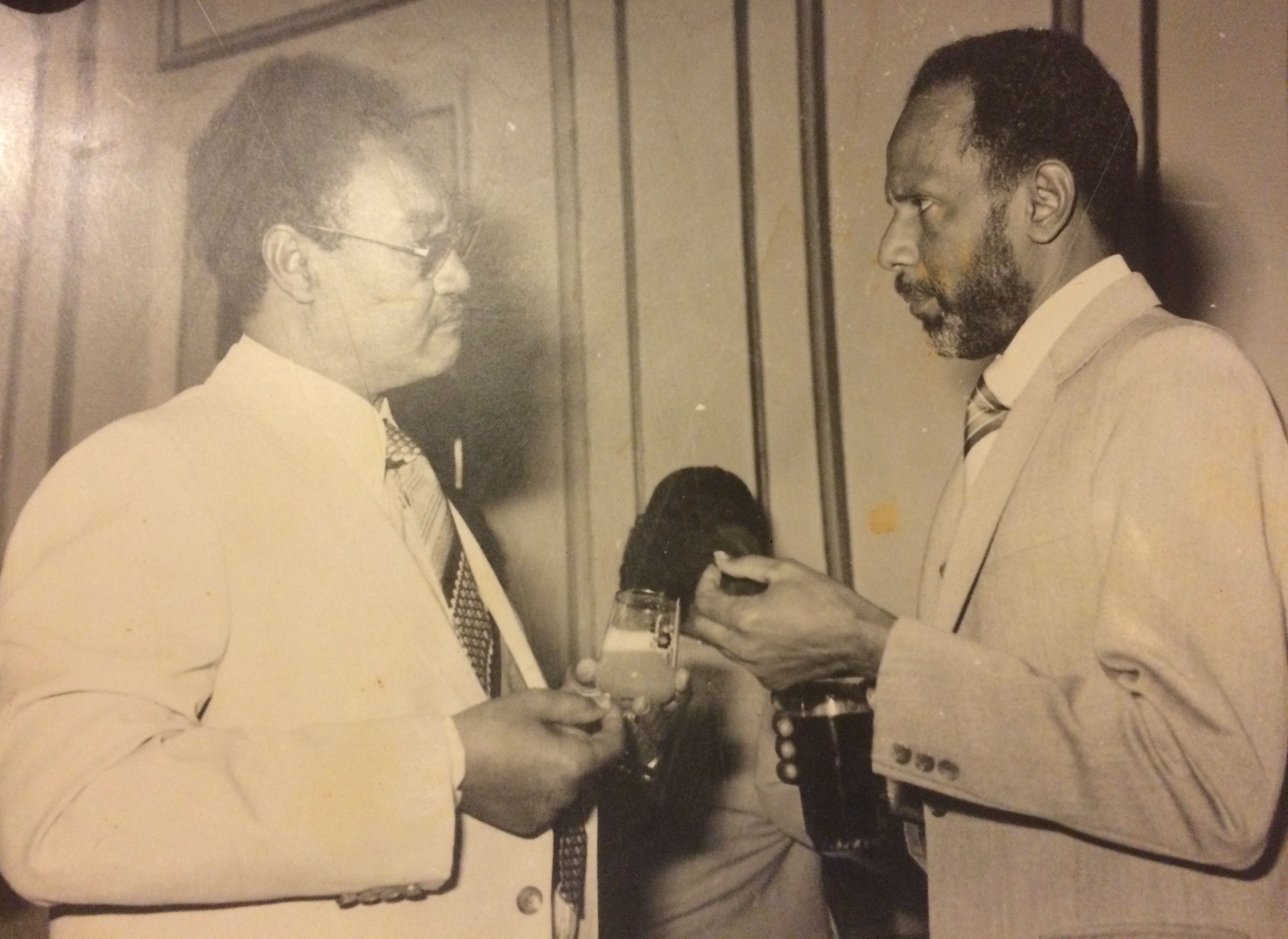
Jaafar Nimeiry (left) switched from communism to Sharia laws with Hasan Al-Turabi (right) aid, after the 1977 National Reconciliation

Nimeiri's Islamic phase resulted in renewed conflict in Southern Sudan in 1983, marking the end of the Addis Ababa Agreement of 1972, which had granted regional autonomy and recognised the diverse nature of Sudanese society. The agreement ensured equality regardless of race or religion and allowed for separate personal laws for non-Muslims. However, hostilities escalated due to oil discovery, dissolution of the Southern Regional Assembly, and decentralisation efforts. Despite this, the Islamic laws implemented by Nimeiri exacerbated the situation. The political landscape shifted with Nimeiri's removal in 1985, leading to the emergence of numerous political parties. The National Islamic Front (NIF), Ansar, and Khatmiyya Sufi order (DUP) played crucial roles in Sudan's politics. Hasan al-Turabi and the NIF consistently supported the Islamic laws and resisted changes.

Another Islamic movement in Sudan was the Republican Brotherhood, founded by Mahmoud Muhammad Taha. This movement embraced the concept of Islam having two messages and abandoned numerous Islamic practices. It advocated for peaceful coexistence with Israel, gender equality, criticised Wahhabism, called for freedoms and refraining from implementing Islamic criminal punishments, and championed a federal social democratic government. Taha strongly opposed the ban on the Sudanese Communist Party and condemned the decision as a distortion of democracy, even though he was not a communist. He was sentenced to apostasy in 1968 and again in 1984, leading to his execution in January 1985 under the September laws, despite his strong opposition. This event significantly fuelled public and international discontent.

=== National Islamic Front (1985–1989) ===
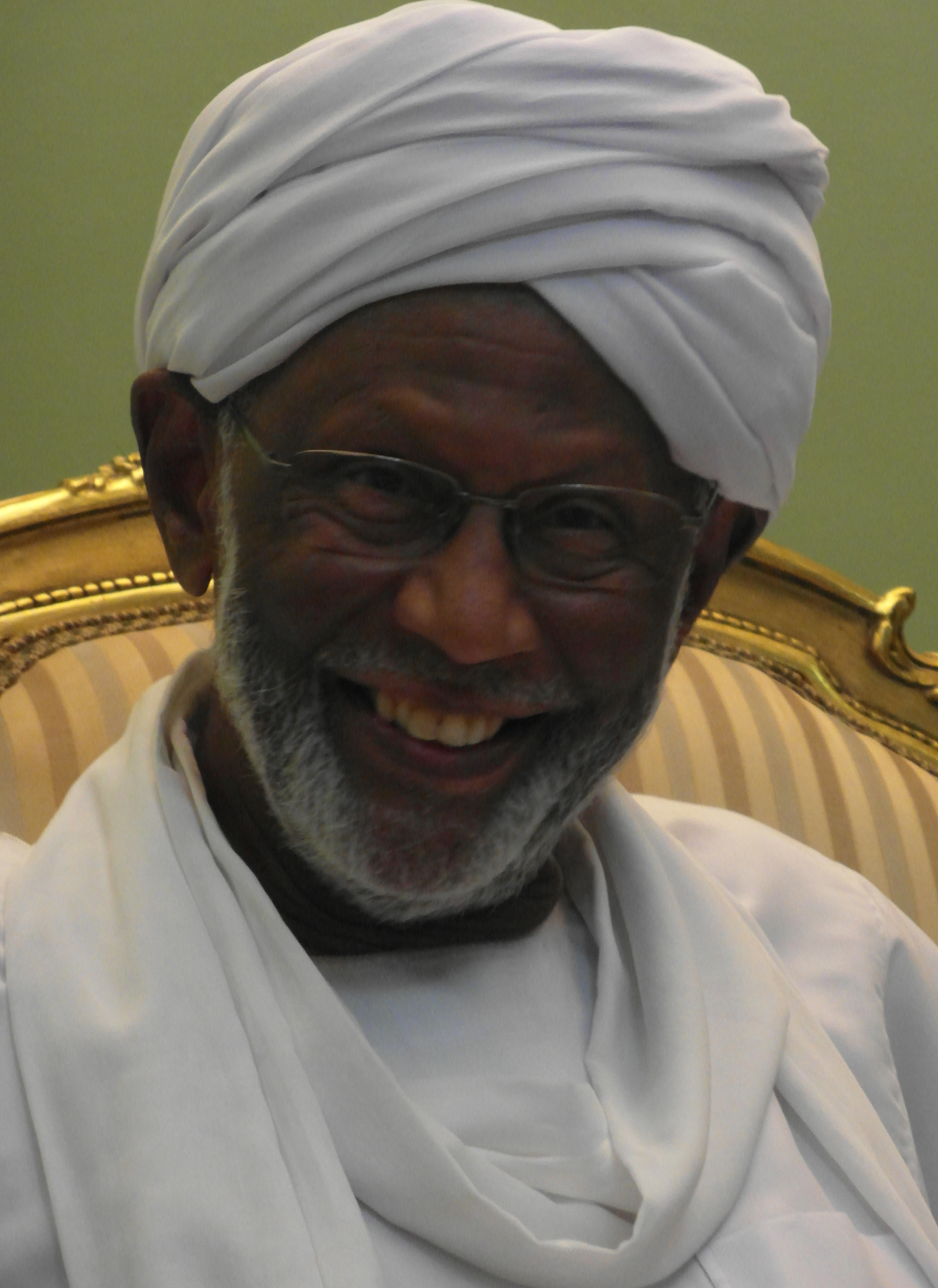
Hassan al-Turabi in 2015

After Nimeiri's regime fell due to the 1985 coup d'état, al-Turabi and his colleagues formed the National Islamic Front (NIF), which emerged as a significant opposition force following their success in the Constituent Assembly elections. The NIF, led by al-Turabi, effectively blocked attempts by Sadiq al-Mahdi, the government and parliamentary majority leader, to repeal the controversial September laws and advance peace talks with the southern region.

Under increasing pressure, Al-Sadiq Al-Mahdi formed an alliance with the NIF in May 1988, leading to the creation of the Government of National Accord. Al-Turabi, as Minister of Justice, was tasked with reforming Sharia laws. Both the nation and the front faced a peace agreement proposed by Muhammad Othman al-Mirghani, leader of the Democratic Unionist Party, with the Sudan People's Liberation Army, the main opposition in the south.

Sadiq al-Mahdi, who initially opposed the Islamic laws he later supported, envisioned a fully Arabised and Islamised southern Sudan. His failure to address Sudan's problems resulted in a military coup by Brigadier Genera Omar al-Bashir in June 1989, which further solidified Islamic principles.

In response to growing challenges related to southern peace talks and the September Laws, Sadiq al-Mahdi reformed the Government of National Accord in February 1988. Al-Turabi's role within the coalition grew, leading him to become Foreign Minister, a move that caused concern in Egypt. In February 1989, the army issued a memorandum to the government, calling for the approval of Al-Mirghani's peace agreement and the resolution of the economic crisis. The NIF viewed this memorandum as a direct attack on them due to their staunch opposition to peace talks with the southern region.

=== Kezan Era (1989–1999) ===
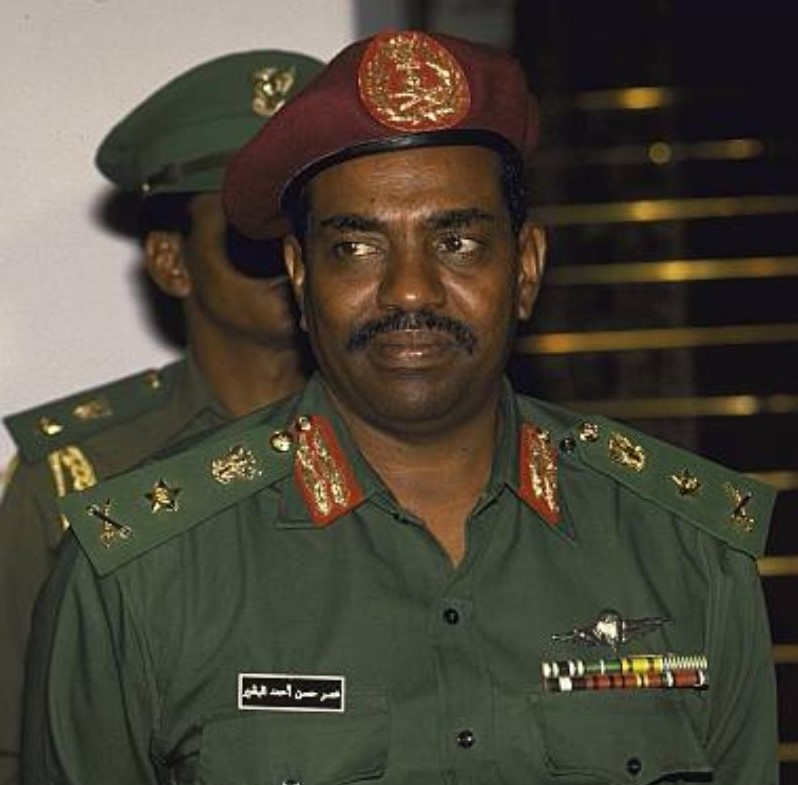
Omar al-Bashir in 1990

On 30 June 1989, Omar al-Bashir led a coup, come to be known as "National Rescue Revolution," against the democratic government, citing economic failures and inability to establish Central African relations as reasons. This led to the arrest of several political leaders, including Hassan al-Turabi. However, by December, the Revolutionary Command Council for National Salvation officers pledged loyalty to al-Turabi. Together, they formed the "Council of Defenders of the Revolution," assuming political leadership.

The regime solidified its power using authoritarian tools, establishing a political security apparatus called "Internal Security," led by Colonel Bakri Hassan Saleh. This body was known for its notorious detention facilities, "ghost houses," where intellectuals were detained and tortured.

In December 1991, the regime introduced a stricter penal code than the September laws and established the "People's Police," akin to Saudi Arabia's Committee for the Promotion of Virtue and the Prevention of Vice. Public freedoms were eroded, and political parties were abolished.

Before these events, al-Turabi and his wife, Wissal Al-Mahdi (the sister of his rival Al-Sadiq Al-Mahdi), held open jurisprudential positions that drew criticism. Al-Turabi had advocated for constitutional rule, but this didn't align with the regime's social policies.

Al-Turabi also worked internationally, trying to establish an "Islamic International" and reconcile with leftist and nationalist groups. In April 1991, he founded the "Arab and Islamic People's Conference," attended by various countries' representatives. That year, Osama bin Laden moved to Khartoum, welcomed by al-Turabi, who facilitated bin Laden's marriage to a relative. Training camps for armed Islamic groups were established in Sudan, and al-Turabi attempted mediation between Hamas and the Palestine Liberation Organization.

Al-Turabi's association with the Egyptian Islamic Jihad in a 1995 assassination plot against Egyptian President Mohamed Hosni Mubarak drew widespread attention. UN sanctions on Sudan in 1996 led to Bin Laden's departure and a decline in al-Turabi's influence. The extradition of Carlos the Jackal to France in 1994 also caused unrest within the National Front towards al-Turabi.

After ten years of upheaval, al-Bashir removed al-Turabi from the National Council presidency in 1999 and ousted him from the National Congress Party's General Secretariat. Al-Turabi responded by forming the "Popular Congress Party" and pragmatically signed a memorandum of understanding with the Sudan People's Liberation Movement, a former adversary, leading to his imprisonment.

During the power struggle between al-Bashir and al-Turabi, the Sudanese Islamic Movement's core body sided with al-Bashir. Ali Othman Taha, a prominent Islamist figure who served as vice president from 1998 to 2013, was among them. The regime became highly militarised during this period, and Islamists were often derisively called "Kizans" (cups in Sudanese Arabic) due to al-Turabi's saying, "Religion is a sea, and we are its cup (kizan)".

=== Sudanese Muslim Brotherhood ===
The Muslim Brotherhood's international organisation branch, led by Sheikh Sadiq Abdullah Abdul Majid and Professor Youssef Nour Al-Daim, faced a crisis in 1991 when an extremist faction won elections. This faction later split into two groups, one of which declared support for Islamic State (ISIS). In 2012, Sheikh Ali Jawish was elected as the group's general observer in Sudan, and under his leadership, a division emerged within the group. Despite being dismissed in 2017, Jawish retained his title until his death.

After the overthrow of Turabi, the Brotherhood participated in the Bashir regime's governments and later joined the December 2018 protest, but the group has limited influence.

In March 2026, the United States designated the Sudanese Muslim Brotherhood as a terrorist organization, adding it to the Treasury Department’s Specially Designated Nationals (SDN) list as both a Foreign Terrorist Organization and Specially Designated Global Terrorist under Executive Order 13224.

Subsequent media reports described intensified efforts by figures linked to the movement to form new political platforms, including a proposed “Islamic Bloc,” as part of repeated attempts to re‑establish influence under new names and alliances. Analysts viewed these efforts as an attempt to reorganize and rebrand the movement in response to declining public support and mounting legal and political challenges. Sky News Arabia likewise characterized the initiative as part of a broader strategy to revive the Muslim Brotherhood’s influence and strengthen support for General Burhan after the movement faced growing isolation and criticism both domestically and internationally.

=== Post-Transition Islamist Movements ===
Following Sudan's transition to democracy, smaller Islamic groups have emerged, either splitting from other movements or being founded by young Islamic intellectuals. These include the "Change Now" movement, the "National Coordination Initiative for Change and Construction", and the "Democratic Islamists" movement. Other initiatives include the "Reform and Renaissance Initiative" and the "Future Now Initiative". These groups have various stances towards the Bashir regime and different visions for the future of Sudan.

== 2023 Sudan War ==
During the 2023 War in Sudan An Islamist resurgence has been observed, potentially complicating interactions with regional powers and the Sudanese army's path towards civilian rule. Furthermore, the Rapid Support Forces (RSF) have targeted hundreds of Islamist leaders and activists in a sweeping campaign, indicating an ongoing struggle between different factions within the country. The SAF depends heavily on Islamist militias, with reports indicating that the Muslim Brotherhood comprises upwards of 75% of the Sudanese armed forces.

On the Side of the SAF fights the Al-Bara' ibn Malik Battalion, a Sudanese Islamist militia. The group traces back to the 1990s when it was part of the Islamized paramilitary structures established under the National Islamic Front and Bashir's rule. The United States has sanctioned the Al-Baraa Bin Malik Brigade due to its Islamist ties and for coordinating with Iran to sow instability in Sudan.
