= Constitution of Sudan =

The temporary de facto Constitution of Sudan (Arabic: دستور السودان, romanized: Dustūr al-Sūdān) is the Draft Constitutional Declaration, which was signed by representatives of the Transitional Military Council and the Forces of Freedom and Change alliance on 4 August 2019. This replaced the Interim National Constitution of the Republic of Sudan, 2005 (INC) adopted on 6 July 2005, which had been suspended on 11 April 2019 by Lt. Gen Ahmed Awad Ibn Auf in the 2019 Sudanese coup d'état.

== 1973 and 1998 constitutions ==
The first permanent Constitution of Sudan was drafted in 1973. It incorporated the Addis Ababa Agreement (1972) ending the first Sudanese civil war.

The 1985 military coup led to suspension of Sudan's 1973 constitution and its replacement with an interim constitution later in the year. One of the first acts of the Revolutionary Command Council for National Salvation after seizing power in 1989 was to abolish the interim constitution. President Omar Al-Bashir promised to prepare a new constitution. It was not until January 1998, however, that Sudan convened a constitutional conference to draft a constitution. It consisted of legal and political scholars representing different political groups sympathetic to al-Bashir’s rule. The Umma Party and the Democratic Unionist Party refused to participate. Most Southerners boycotted the conference. Voters in Sudan’s single-party system approved the constitution in a 1998 referendum, a process that raised questions about the degree to which the public accepted the document.

The constitution entered into force on July 1, 1998. A significant feature of the individual-rights provisions of the 1998 constitution was the frequent use of the qualifier “in accordance with law” attached to most freedoms. On the other hand, there was no requirement that only Muslims could hold public office, including the office of president. Non-Muslims were free to practice, convert, and doubt the main tenets of their religion as long as they did not interfere with the spiritual life of Muslims. There were, nevertheless, inherent conflicts between Sudan’s Islamic political system and the way in which Muslims applied the principles of shura. The constitution attempted to balance a strong preference for Islamic beliefs and a grudging acceptance of internationally accepted human rights. In 1999, dissenting members of the National Assembly (the lower house of the legislature) tried to amend the constitution by restricting the president’s involvement in the selection of candidates for governors of the federal states. Speaker of the National Assembly Hassan al-Turabi supported the amendment, but the proposal led al-Bashir to dissolve the National Assembly and declare a state of emergency under the constitution. These steps had the effect of suspending the decentralization process stipulated in the constitution and gave al-Bashir full authority over the states. Legislators supporting al-Turabi challenged the state of emergency before the Constitutional Court, which concluded that al-Bashir’s actions were constitutional.

== 2005 Interim National Constitution ==
On May 26, 2004, the government and the Sudan People's Liberation Movement (SPLM) signed the Protocol on Power Sharing, later part of the Comprehensive Peace Agreement. The protocol provided for a National Constitutional Review Commission (NCRC) composed of representatives from the National Congress Party, SPLM, other political forces, and civil society. It was charged with preparing a legal and constitutional framework based on the peace agreement and the 1998 constitution for adoption by the National Assembly and the SPLM.

The result was the Interim National Constitution of the Republic of Sudan, which the National Assembly and the SPLM National Liberation Council adopted on July 6, 2005. For its part, the Government of South Sudan then adopted on December 5, 2005, an Interim Constitution of South Sudan that did not contradict any of the provisions contained in the Interim National Constitution. The NCRC prepared a model constitution for all 25 states, compatible with both the Interim National Constitution and the one for South Sudan. The states of South Sudan adopted their own constitutions, which had to conform to both interim constitutions. Before the end of the six-year interim period mandated by the Comprehensive Peace Agreement, the NCRC was also responsible for organizing an inclusive constitutional-review process. According to the Interim National Constitution, the crucial six-year interim period began officially on July 9, 2005.

Both the Interim National Constitution and the Interim Constitution of South Sudan authorized the 15 states in the North and the 10 states in South Sudan to have their own constitutions. States in the North began the constitutional drafting process in mid-2005 based on a model constitution drafted by a subcommittee of the NCRC. The most controversial process was in Khartoum State where there were concerns about the rights of non-Muslims and human rights generally. Blue Nile and South Kordofan States, disputed areas that are also strategically located, posed problems for the constitutional-development process. The drafting of state constitutions in the South began later than in the North but was relatively uncontroversial because the SPLM held a 70 percent majority in the state legislatures and could largely control the outcome.

The Interim National Constitution was officially suspended following the April 2019 military coup which overthrew the country's President of 30 years Omar al-Bashir.

== August 2019 Draft Constitutional Declaration ==
On 5 July 2019, the Forces of Freedom and Change (FFC) alliance, representing a wide range of citizens' groups, political opposition parties and armed opposition groups who had protested for many months since December 2018 via massive and sustained civil disobedience, agreed on a deal with the Transitional Military Council (TMC) for a 39-month plan of recreating political institutions to return to a democratic system.

On 3 August 2019, the Political Agreement from July was complemented by a more extensive constitutional document, with 70 legal articles organised in 16 chapters, called the Draft Constitutional Declaration. The document was signed on 4 August 2019 by Ahmed Rabie of the FFC and Mohamed Hamdan Dagalo ("Hemetti") of the TMC.

The Draft Constitutional Declaration defines the leadership, institutions and procedures for the 39-month transition period.

=== February 2025 amendments ===
The Transitional Sovereignty Council and the Cabinet of Sudan agreed amendments to the Constitutional Declaration on 19 February 2025, which came into force after being published in the Official Gazette on 23 February 2025. The amendments removed references to the Rapid Support Forces and Forces of Freedom and Change, prohibits holders of foreign nationality from government positions, and grants the Transitional Sovereignty Council oversight over foreign policy. They establish a Transitional Legislative Authority, to act as Sudan's legislature until a Transitional Legislative Council can be formed and extends the transitional period by another 39 months.
