= 1973 Constitution of Sudan =

Constitution of the Republic of the Sudan from 1973 to 1985

English copy of the 1973 Constitution of Sudan

The 1973 Constitution of Sudan, known at the time as the Permanent Constitution of Sudan, was the first permanent constitution in Sudan introduced under the leadership of President Gaafar Nimeiry. The constitution explicitly identified Islamic law as a primary source of legislation, which was a pivotal shift from previous legal frameworks that had been more secular in nature. The constitution was enacted in May 1973.

== The constitution ==
Gaafar Nimeiry came to power after 1969 coup d'état which was in collaboration with the Sudanese Communist Party, which saw the end of the Sudan's second democratic era that came after the October 1964 revolution. At the beginning, Nimeiry's government would pursue a radical Arab nationalist and leftist program, bringing in a socialist program for social and economic development, including widespread nationalization of private property. His government would also push for an end to the First Sudanese Civil War, which by 1969 had been ongoing since 1955.

=== Islamisation and Arabisation of Sudan ===
The 1973 permanent constitution replaced the 1956 Transitional Constitution of Sudan. The first article, of 225 constitution's articles, set the scene by stating that:

The Democratic Republic of the Sudan is a unitary, democratic, socialist and sovereign republic, and is part of both the Arab and African entities.

— Article 1, Part 1: Sovereignty and the State, the Permanent Constitution of the Sudan

It later acknowledged Christianity and other spiritual beliefs and validated the 1972 Addis Ababa Agreement which aimed to shield southern Sudan from northern domination. However, the constitution explicitly identified Islamic law as a primary source of legislation (Article 9), which was a pivotal shift from previous legal frameworks that had been more secular in nature. The constitution also explicitly identified Arabic as the official country language, despite southern Sudan objection.

=== Southern Sudan ===
The Nimeiry regime (1969–1985) aimed to establish a one-party constitution and supported the 1972 Addis Ababa Peace Agreement, ending Sudan’s first civil war. However, the agreement was not included in the 1973 Permanent Constitution, making it easy to ignore. While it granted some self-rule to southern states, it left the northern autocratic state unchanged, leading to discontent. Thus, local governance structures were established to provide some degree of autonomy for the Southern Sudan Autonomous Region (1972–1983). However, these measures were often seen as insufficient and were met with scepticism by Southern leaders, who felt that the central government was not genuinely committed to a federal system that would allow for meaningful self-governance. The tensions between the central government and regional authorities would later escalate, culminating in renewed conflict and ultimately the secession of South Sudan in 2011.

In 1983, Nimeiry imposed Islamic laws, known as September Laws, on the southern states, sparking a renewed civil war led by the Sudan People's Liberation Movement/Sudan People's Liberation Army.

=== Division of authority ===
The 1973 Constitution established a framework for a central governance that regulated the distribution of authority among the three levels of government and defined the roles and powers of governmental bodies at each level, which aimed to balance power between the executive and legislative and judicial branches. However, the practical application of these provisions was often undermined by Nimeiry's authoritarian tendencies. The regime's centralisation of power led to the suppression of political dissent and the marginalisation of opposition parties, which ultimately contributed to widespread unrest and dissatisfaction among various segments of the population leading to the 1985 coup d'état.

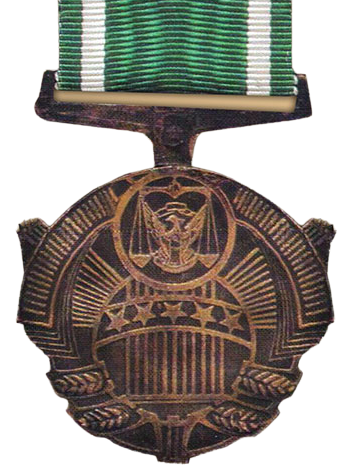
Order of the Constitution

The constitution was adopted in May 1973 without public participation, centralising power in the President. By 1977, the regime aligned with Islamist elements, further Islamising the legal system. The First People's Assembly's Speaker and Members were given the Medal of the Constitution for their contribution to the discussion of the constitution draft.

=== Social implication ===
In addition to its political and legal implications, the 1973 Constitution also had a significant impact on social norms and gender roles within Sudanese society. The emphasis on Islamic law reinforced traditional gender roles and often limited women's rights, particularly in areas such as marriage, inheritance, and employment. This legal framework contributed to the perpetuation of social barriers that hindered women's participation in public life and economic activities.

=== Freedom of speech and academic independent ===
The constitution was the first to safeguard freedom of religion and expression (Part III), with Article 48 explicitly outlining this right. Article 19, ensure the independency of the academic institutions.

=== Private property ===
The 1973 Sudan Constitution values private property for its social benefits, allowing ownership unless it conflicts with public interest. It ensures fair compensation for property confiscation, nationalization, or requisition, but notes that protection of private property is not absolute.

== Replacement ==
In April 1985, shortly after the new government took power, the Transitional Military Council suspended the 1973 Constitution and replaced it with the Transitional Constitution of Sudan. However, the 1973 Constitution laid the groundwork for subsequent constitutional developments in Sudan, including the 1998 and 2005 constitutions, which sought to address some of the shortcomings of the 1973 framework. However, the foundational issues of governance, regional autonomy, and social equity remained largely unresolved, contributing to ongoing political instability and conflict in the country.
