= Criminal Act 1991 (Sudan) =

Law in Sudan

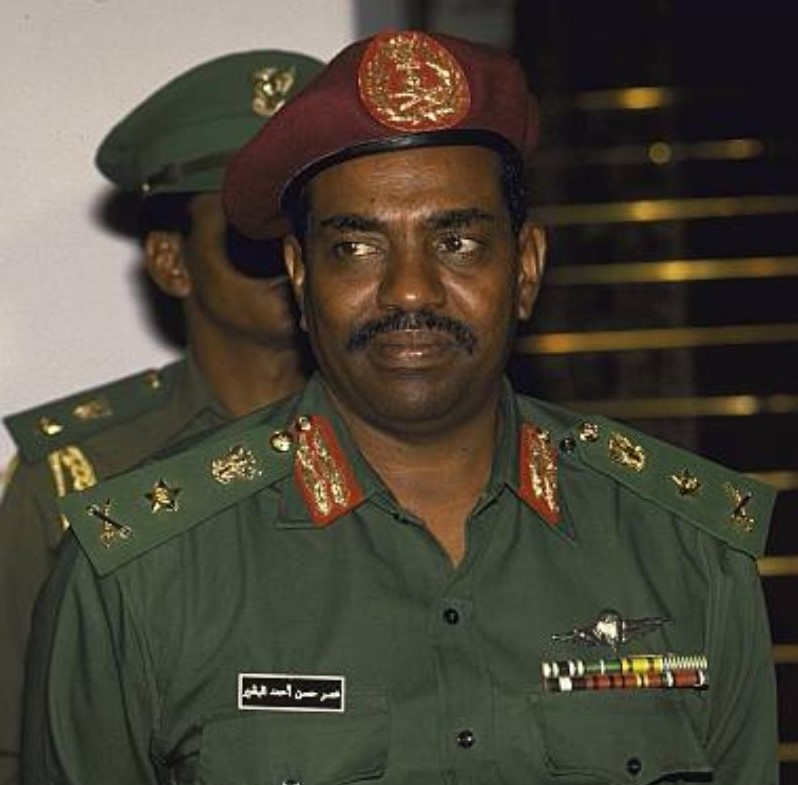
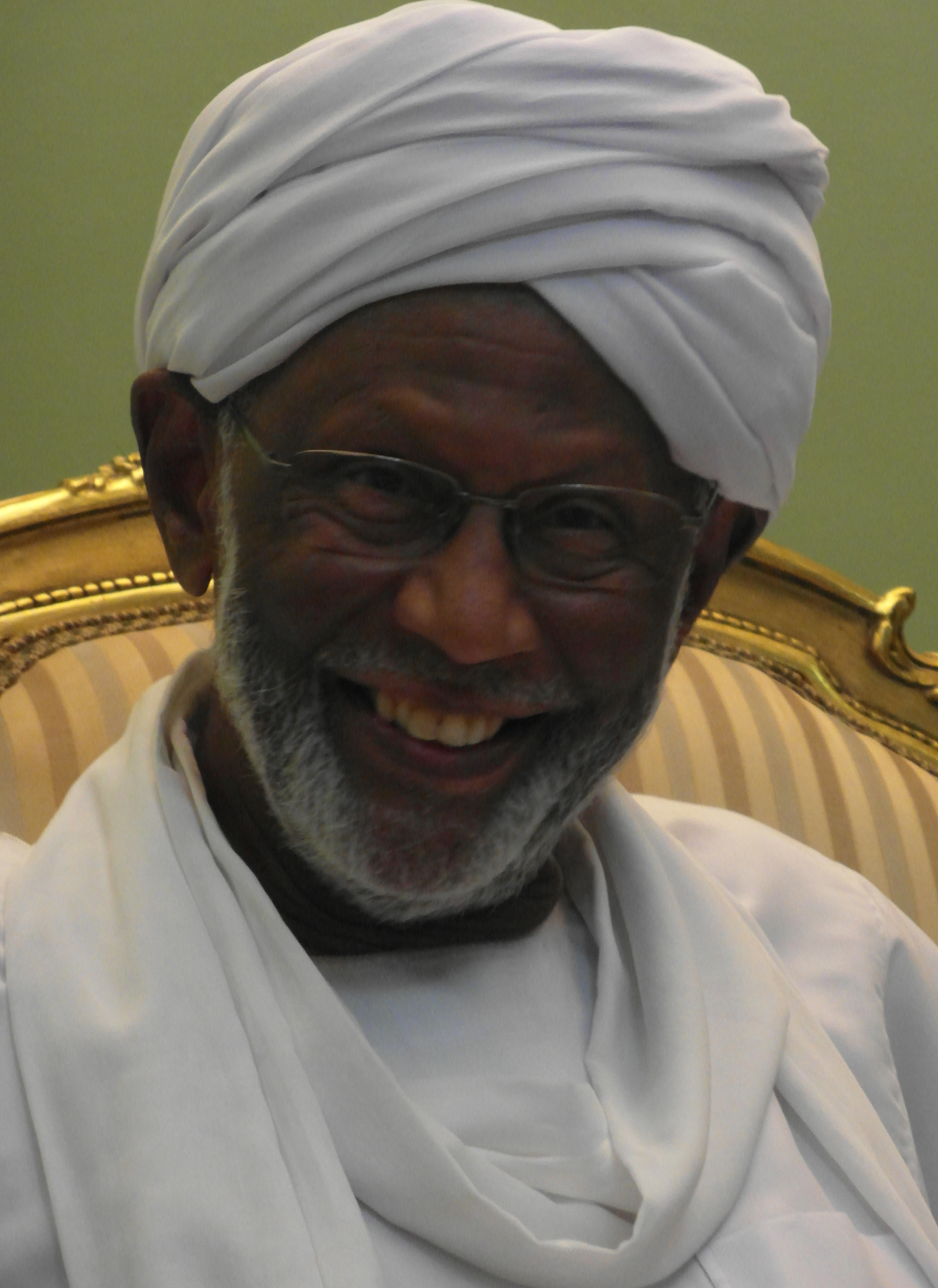
Omar al-Bashir came after the 1989 coup d'état that was orchestrated by al-Turabi. They re-introduced sharia laws through the 1991 Sudanese Criminal Act

The Criminal Act of 1991 in Sudan was enacted to align the country's legal system with Islamic principles, incorporating Shari'a law. It replaced the Penal Code of 1983 and includes provisions for hudud (fixed punishments for severe crimes like theft and adultery), qisas (retributive justice for murder or bodily harm), and ta'zir (discretionary punishments for less severe offenses). The Act also criminalises apostasy, punishable by death, and has been criticised for harsh penalties such as amputation and flogging. Significant amendments were made in 2020, including the removal of the death penalty for apostasy and the repeal of Public Order Laws.

== History and context ==
Through the introduction of the September 1983 Laws, Nimeiry's partnership with the Muslim Brotherhood and the Ansar was intended to unify religious factions and introduce sharia law. However, despite initially working together, the Ansar criticised Nimeiry's application of these laws as being both un-Islamic and corrupt. After Nimeiry's removal after the 1985 coup d'état, Sudan's political landscape transformed, giving rise to multiple political parties. The National Islamic Front (NIF), Ansar, and Khatmiyya Sufi order (DUP) became significant players in Sudanese politics. Hassan al-Turabi and the NIF consistently advocated for Islamic laws and opposed alterations to the existing framework.

The laws were frozen during Sudan’s transition to democracy after the 1985 coup d'état, but were reinstated during the Omar al-Bashir era between 1989 and 2019, after the 1989 coup d'état.

The Criminal Act of 1991 enacted by the Revolutionary Command Council for National Salvation on 31 January 1991, replaced the Penal Code of 1983. This legislation aimed to align Sudanese law more closely with Islamic principles, incorporating elements of Shari'a law. It includes provisions for hudud, qisas, and ta'zir offenses and punishments. The Act also defines various terms and conditions under which certain actions are considered criminal, aiming to provide a comprehensive legal framework for criminal justice in Sudan.

Hudud offenses cover severe crimes such as theft, adultery, and apostasy, with fixed punishments. Qisas refers to retributive justice, often applied in cases of murder or bodily harm, allowing for equivalent retaliation or compensation Ta'zir offenses are less severe and their punishments are discretionary, determined by a judge based on the circumstances. One notable aspect of the Act is the criminalisation of apostasy (renouncing Islam), which is punishable by death under Section 126. This has been a point of significant controversy and criticism from human rights organisations.

== Application ==
The 1991 Sudanese Criminal Act, in accordance with sharia, authorised hudud punishments in the north. The consumption of alcohol was punishable by 40 lashes for a Muslim and 20 lashes for a Christian. Islamic family jurisprudence applied to Muslims in Sudan, while certain Islamic law provisions discriminated against women, especially regarding inheritance, marriage and divorce. Women were instructed to dress modestly according to Islamic standards, including wearing a head covering which was enforced by the Public Order Police. In addition, converting from Islam to another religion was considered apostasy under sharia and was punishable by death in the North.

For example, in 2009 a group of women, excluding journalist Lubna al-Hussein, were lashed for wearing jeans. In 2022, a woman was due to be stoned for adultery before being jailed for 6 months. In 1991, 2013, 2015, 2021, and 2023, there were documented cases of men being sentenced to hand amputation for theft. In 2013, 3 men were sentenced to amputation for stealing cooking oil in North Darfur under article 173 of the 1991 Sudanese Criminal code, but the sentence was later overturned. On 14 February 2013, a man's right hand and foot were amputated at al-Ribat Hospital after he was convicted with armed robbery, known as "Hirabah" in article 168 of the 1991 Sudanese Criminal Act. A similar cross-amputation sentence was issued and enforced in 2021.

=== Effect on women's rights ===
The Criminal Act of 1991 in Sudan, along with the Public Order Laws, has had a significant impact on women's rights in the country. These laws were designed to enforce strict moral codes and public behaviour, often disproportionately targeting women. Public Order Laws governed various aspects of public behaviour, including dress codes, social interactions, and public gatherings. Women were frequently arrested for "indecent or immoral dress," which could include wearing trousers or not covering their hair. The Public Order Police had extensive powers to enforce these laws, leading to widespread harassment and public humiliation of women.

Articles within this act, such as Article 152, criminalised acts deemed indecent or immoral, with punishments including flogging and fines. This law was often used to control women's behaviour and restrict their freedoms. The enforcement of these laws restricted women's participation in public life, including their ability to work and engage in social activities. This had broader implications for their economic independence and social status.

== Criticism ==
The Act has been criticised for including harsh punishments such as amputation, flogging, and the death penalty for certain crimes. These punishments have raised serious human rights concerns, particularly regarding their alignment with international human rights standards.

On 17 March 2000, Curtis Francis Doebbler, a lawyer and human rights advocate, filed a case against Sudan, known as Curtis Francis Doebbler v. Sudan, before the African Union Commission. Doebbler alleged that Sudan violated various provisions of the African Charter on Human and Peoples' Rights by arbitrarily arresting, detaining, and torturing individuals, including himself, during his work as legal counsel. On 29 May 2003, the African Union Commission found that Sudan violated Article 5 of the African Charter and requested that the Sudanese government to amend the 1991 Criminal Code, abolish punishment by lashing, and compensate the survivors.

== Amendment ==
In recent years, there have been significant amendments to the Act. For example, in 2020, the Transitional Government of Sudan made several changes, including the elimination of the death penalty for apostasy and the removal of flogging as a punishment for certain offences. The Public Order Laws were repelled in 2019.

== See also ==
- Capital punishment in Sudan
- Legal system of Sudan
- Human rights in Sudan
