= Cross-amputation =

Sharia law punishment

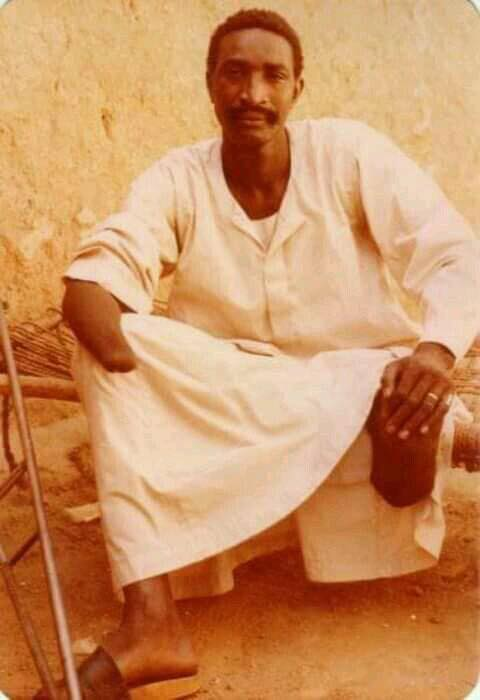
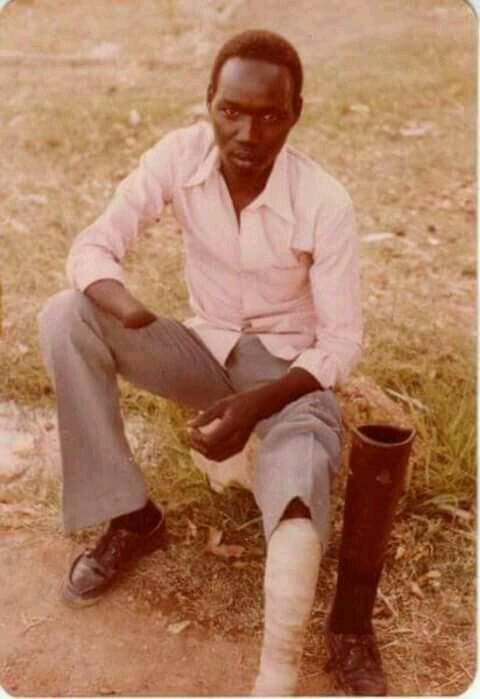
Cross amputation survivors, Adam Ismaeel (left) and Ibrahim Osman (right), of the September 1983 Laws in Sudan, pictured in 1986

Cross-amputation (Arabic: قطع من خلاف) is a form of punitive judicial limb amputation and one of the Hudud punishments prescribed under Islamic jurisprudence (Sharia law). It involves removing diagonally opposite limbs from the alleged transgressor, typically the right hand and left foot. The scriptural authority for the double amputation procedure is in the Quran (surah 5: 33 and 38), which stipulates:

"The punishment of those who protest against Allah and His Messenger, and strive with might for mischief through the land is execution or crucifixion, or cutting of hands and feet from opposite sides, or exile from the land: that is their disgrace in this world, and a heavy punishment is theirs in the Hereafter;" (33)

As for the thief, both male and female, cut off their hands. It is the reward of their own deeds, an exemplary punishment from Allah. Allah is Mighty, Wise. (38)

— Quran, translation by Abdullah Yusuf Ali., 5.33

The right hand is always amputated during the administration of the punishment regardless of whether the victim is right- or left-handed. This is because the Muslim faith decrees that the right hand should be used for clean purposes such as writing or eating, while the left is reserved for unclean tasks, such as cleaning following defecation. By removing the right hand as part of the punishment, the victim is subsequently forced to use his or her 'unclean' left hand for tasks such as eating, and this added humiliation or indignity is regarded as part of the punishment. The punishment is sometimes combined with crucifixion, whereby the culprit is first of all attached to a cross (either by rope or by being nailed to the cross) and then the right hand and left foot are cut off. Such a sentence usually leads to death by blood loss.

== Practice ==
The ancient punishment, typically used for highway robbery (hirabah, qat' al-tariq) and civil disturbance against Islam, is usually carried out in a single session in public, without anaesthetic and using a sword. In the case of a repeat thief, who may already have had a right hand previously removed for theft, a second offence can lead a court to impose a second judicial amputation of a foot, in effect turning the second amputation into a cross-amputation. In the countries mentioned below, doctors attend the amputations to manage blood loss and pain by administering tourniquets, analgesic medication and bandaging.

The country with the most recent cases is Iran, with "at least 223 amputations have been carried out by Iranian authorities out of 384 known sentences since 1979, according to the US-based rights group the Abdorrahman Boroumand Centre." There seems to be a gradual transition to finger amputation using a specialised machine since 2013 and particularly since 2019.

Brunei enacted in 2019 a new penal code, which also includes the amputation of a hand and a foot for the crime of theft." But it has not carried out the punishment as of 2025.

Saudi Arabia saw a high of 27 amputations in 2000, but amputation sentences were commuted in 2012, and no sentences are widely reported since then.

The punishment is also practiced in other countries such as Sudan; Somalia; Mauritania, the Maldives, and Yemen. The practice was common under the rule of the Islamic State and continues to be used in Taliban controlled Afghanistan.

== Sources ==
- Kadri, Sadakat (2012). Heaven on Earth: A Journey Through Shari'a Law from the Deserts of Ancient Arabia ... Macmillan. ISBN 9780099523277.
