= Constitution of the Republic of Sudan 1998 =

The 1998 Constitution of Sudan, known at the time as the Constitution of the Republic of Sudan, was enforced in 1998. It stated the guiding principles for the Republic of Sudan including language, national symbols, economy, rights, freedoms, responsibilities, foreign policy and other key elements of Sudanese law. It had 9 parts composed of several chapters. The original text is in Arabic.

There was no requirement that only Muslims could hold public office, including the office of president. Non-Muslims were free to practice, convert, and doubt the main tenets of their religion as long as they did not interfere with the spiritual life of Muslims.

== Background and history ==
The 1989 Sudanese coup d'état was a military takeover on June 30, 1989, in which the Sudanese Armed Forces, led by then–Brigadier Omar al-Bashir, overthrew the democratically elected government of Sadiq al-Mahdi. The coup ushered in a 30-year authoritarian regime under al-Bashir and significantly reshaped Sudan’s political, social, and religious landscape. The 1998 Constitution of the Republic of Sudan unfolded during a period of political transformation following the 1989 coup d'état, which brought a military-backed government to power under al-Bashir.

After consolidating control, the government instigated a constitutional process to formalize its political framework. A constitutional drafting committee was established to prepare a new national constitution that would reflect the government's vision of governance, including Islamic legal principles.

In October 1997, the government created the National Constitutional Committee, which voted on a final version of the constitution before putting it to the electorate for a referendum. The committee was created to centralize the constitution-making process during a period of ongoing civil war and intense Islamization. Despite never reaching a formal quorum, the committee submitted its proposal, leading to the adoption of the 1998 constitution which established an "Islamic federal system". This effort followed nearly a decade of rule by Omar al-Bashir.

== Stipulations ==
The 1998 Constitution introduced several important legal and political principles:

=== System of government ===
It set up a presidential system, with extensive executive powers vested in the President. The President served as both head of state and head of government, with authority over the executive branch and significant influence over the legislature.

=== Role of religion ===
The constitution recognized Islam as a central source of legislation, reflecting Sudan’s identity as an Islamic state. However, it also acknowledged the country’s religious diversity.

=== Religious freedom ===
While Islamic law influenced national legislation, the constitution included provisions that formally guaranteed freedom of religion, allowing individuals to practice their faiths.

=== National principles ===
It emphasized national unity, social justice, and the rule of law. The constitution also outlined fundamental rights and duties of citizens, although in practice, these rights were often limited by government control.

=== Structure of the state ===
The constitution provided for a federal system, dividing powers between the national government and regional states, though real authority remained concentrated at the center.

== Key facts ==
- Adopted: June 30, 1998
- Form of government: Presidential republic
- Legislature: National Assembly
- Suspended: 2005, replaced by the Interim National Constitution
- Primary drafter: National Congress Party under Omar al-Bashir
