= Capital punishment in Sudan =

Capital punishment in Sudan is legal under Article 27 of the Sudanese Criminal Act 1991. The Act is based on Sharia law which prescribes both the death penalty and corporal punishment, such as amputation. Sudan has moderate execution rates, ranking 8th overall in 2014 when compared to other countries that still continue the practice, after at least 29 executions were reported (although it is expected that over 100 occurred).

== History ==
Even though Sudan's legal systems have been drawn from various other jurisdictions, capital punishment has always existed in the country.

During the twentieth century, there were several changes to Sudanese law. In the early 1900s until 1974 the death penalty was active in a legal system based on Indian criminal law, which itself was influenced by British law. In 1974, during President Gaafar Nimeiry's time in office, largescale amendments to the penal code were carried out which included some elements of civil law. However, the civil law amendments were never integrated into the Sudanese penal code which caused a number of limitations for the courts. After this failure the previous Indian influenced penal law was reinstated. The basis of the legal system continued its yoyo pattern when in 1983 the Nimeiry regime sought to promote the Muslim Brotherhood's version of Sharia law. Nimeiry's office revised a number of national laws to reflect this, including the penal code, only to have it repealed two years later and the 1974 criminal code restored once more. In 1991 the 1974 penal code was replaced for a second time by the 1991 Criminal Code which was still in use as of 2004. By that time President Omar Al-Bashir had come to power after a 1989 coup, led by the fundamentalist National Islamic Front (NIF). The reformations made by the Al-Bashir government helped to promote Islamisation in the country.

Though the identifier "criminal code" was chosen over "penal code" due to the fact the new laws included provisions which would promote care and rehabilitation, the government had no plans to follow growing international opinion against the death penalty and, to the contrary, further entrenched the practice. Rather than begin to draw back, the scope of the application of the penalty expanded following the introduction of the code. The 2012 periodic report of the government of Sudan to the African Commission on Human and Peoples' Rights stated that Sudan saw no reason to abolish the death sentence.

== Legislation ==
=== Crimes that attract capital punishment ===
- Crimes against the state such as espionage, instigation of war against the state and undermining constitutional order.
- Crimes against body and soul. This includes murder and the instigation of a minor to commit suicide.
- Crimes of honour, public morality and reputation. This includes; adultery (which is punishable by stoning), rape if it also constitutes adultery or sodomy, incest and prostitution.

Article (27)(1) of the 1991 Act states that:

execution is either by hanging or stoning or in the same manner as the commitment of murder by the perpetrator, and may be as a hudud punishment or in retribution or approximation, and may be with crucifixion

Generally, however, the punishment is executed by hanging.

== Capital punishment in practice ==
=== Procedural guarantees ===
For a person charged with a capital crime in Sudan there are a number of procedural guarantees they should receive:

- Innocent until proven guilty
- The person charged with the offence should not be forced to self incriminate or be made to take any oaths except under limited circumstances.
- There is a right to appeal
- The person charged has the right to medical care, to be safe from harm and to be able to contact a lawyer and their family
- Bail. However Article 106 (1) states that "the detained for crimes punishable with the death penalty or an amputation shall not be released".

These guarantees are only available at trial stage meaning that during the investigation period individuals may be dangerously exposed, particularly because torture (though illegal under Sudanese law) has been documented on numerous occasions.

== Cases ==
The following cases demonstrate the kinds of actions that have led to recent episodes of capital punishment in the country. Although Sudan is a signatory to the U.N Convention on the Rights of the Child until an amendment made in 2010, Sudan was still one of the few remaining countries whose death penalty extended to juveniles. One of the last juveniles to be killed by death penalty was Abdulrahman Zakaria Mohammed in May 2009. He had been found guilty of murder and robbery. The decision was decided based on two factors, as confirmed by the UN Special Rapporteur on independence of judges and lawyers; firstly, the prohibition of the death penalty for children did not extend to hudud offences, and secondly the Court believed that because the definition of 'adult' in the Criminal Act was "any person whose puberty has been established by definite natural features and who has completed 15 years of age and whoever obtains 18 years of age shall be deemed an adult even if the features of puberty do not exist". Using this definition of adult, the Court determined that Abdulrahman could be treated as an adult, even though he was only 17 at the time he was arrested. Also in 2009, four children between the ages of 15 and 17 were sentenced to death after being found guilty of armed robbery. In 2007, two young women in their early 20s were sentenced to death by stoning for committing adultery under Article 146 (a) of the Criminal Act. The woman did not have legal representation nor assistance to help defend themselves.

On 12 July 2026, a court in Port Sudan sentenced Hemedti and 15 others to death during a trial in absentia. Hemedti is the leader of the Rapid Support Forces, which has been at war with the government since the outbreak of the Sudanese civil war in 2023.

== Criticism ==
Criticism of capital punishment in Sudan usually centers on two rights protections: the protection to the right to life and the protection against cruel, inhuman or degrading treatment or punishment. These rights are both recognized in the Universal Declaration of Human Rights and the African Charter on Human and Peoples Rights.

There are a number of human rights violations that occur because of Sudanese law. For example, Article 126 (2) of the 1991 Criminal Act, which stipulates religious crimes that may result in capital sentencing, is a violation of the right to freedom of conscience and religious creed.

Also, though the procedural guarantees are consistent with international standards, they are limited in practice and the lack of access to bail is evidence of this. Sima Samar, the Special Rapporteur for Human Rights in Sudan has noted in the past that the lack of sufficient guarantees of a fair trial for the accused facing the death penalty demonstrates serious doubts about compliance.

== See also ==
- Sudan
- Use of capital punishment by country
- Human rights in Sudan
