= Sudanese society =

Sudanese society was very much in flux in the 2000s. Various factors included:

- rural to urban migration;
- the large numbers of displaced persons—foreign and native—in so many parts of the country, many of whom were starting to return to their homes after the end of the Sudanese civil war;
- economic pressures forcing more and more women into the labor force;
- the increased availability of modern technology (e.g., cellular telephones, television stations, and the growing availability of the Internet to at least professional elites in urban settings),.

The “old” Sudan, where religious, tribal, and village notables held sway in an unchallenged fashion, so prevalent for most of the twentieth century and before, still existed but no longer dominated the country's social order. Parallel to it were fragmented societies in large urban settings, smaller kinship communities in the poorer outskirts ringing the large centers, and the extensive dwelling areas of displaced persons who were at least temporarily cut off from their traditional leaders. Young men and women more often than not had to fend for themselves in order to make ends meet.

In addition, it was alleged— although such a factor was probably exaggerated—that most Sudanese had relatives living abroad who sent not only some financial support but also accompanying ideas about other ways of living, worshipping, and identifying. While such influences were common for North Africans who lived close to Europe, or Lebanese and Palestinians working in Gulf countries or overseas, they were relatively new to Sudan.

Many outside observers have noted over the years how strongly anchored Sudanese customs and values have been. Historically, poor Sudanese found economic and personal support with their kinfolk, and it was not uncommon for a man fallen on hard times to stay at a relative's home for months at a time, certain in the knowledge that he would be cared for and not asked for anything in return. In the new century, this pattern has become the exception rather than the rule. If there is no future at home, the preferred option is to join relatives abroad, for those who can devise the means to do so.

== New social order ==
In the “new” social order in the early 2000s, at least five separate lifestyles can be observed:

- people living in the core of the major cities,
- People living in the exurbs surrounding them,
- settled village folk in the rural areas,
- semi-nomads
- genuine pastoralists.

The last two categories are distinguished by the fact that semi-nomads have a defined home base inhabited year-round by the old, the very young, and the infirm, but from which the rest of the tribe moves out for six to nine months at a time and then returns. Genuine pastoralists, who are very few in number, have no fixed specific address but roam in generalized areas that are commonly recognized by friend and foe.

== Leadership ==
=== Rural areas ===
The paramount chief remains a venerated figure for tribally organized Sudanese, one who still dispenses judgments regarding personal conduct, answers local administrative questions, and sometimes even comments on marriage. Among Arabs and Arabized Northerners, he is known as the nazir. Below him is the subtribal chief usually referred to as sheikh (although that term has multiple meanings). Most people in the South also recognize paramount chiefs for large tribes, but their honorific names vary locally.

In rural villages and even in some near the edges of large cities, the administrative head is referred to as omda. His role as village headman parallels in many ways that of the patriarch of an extended family and, in large villages, that of the sheikh heading the hara, or quarter. Omda rule by consensus, rather than by dictate, take responsibility for knowing every person living in their area, and are always approachable by one and all. They, not the police, adjudicate disputes. They mediate between families, and they offer advice on education, work opportunities, and marriage issues. Their source of authority is always customary law, although some central governments validate their positions officially, as did the British-led colonial administration and the early post-independence regimes, which preferred to administer local government through such traditional leaders. They should not, however, be seen as autocrats, because their position depends on acceptance by the community and they are required to consult regularly with all parties, most especially with local “wise men” with whom they are likely to be in daily contact.

Parallel to these territorial communities are the religious associations. In settled rural areas, the faqih might have similar authority to the omda or sheikh, except that his domain is typically limited to spiritual and mystical areas; he would not be consulted on matters of local government.

=== Urban and exurban areas ===
The closer one approaches to the cities through the more rural outskirts—and in the case of the capital region through impoverished refugee camps—the central and widely accepted authority figure is absent. There are, of course, some local leaders, but their authority does not compare with that of the sheikh or nazir.

If local disputes arise and they cannot be resolved quickly by government authorities, who in any case would have less legitimacy than the traditional leaders in the eyes of the local populace, the dispute might simply fester for long periods, or the offended party might move away to another ex-urban location. Newcomers to urban centers have shallow roots by definition and feel less pressured to conform to local norms, to which they have no allegiance in this extremely heterogeneous society.

Aside from the presence of government buildings, core urban areas tend to be more stable because of their location and longevity. Established neighborhoods used to be “overseen” by a sheikh, but in recent years the civil servants, businessmen, educators, laborers, entertainers, and other professional people are consumed by the typical urban preoccupations of seemingly never-ending rush-hour traffic, shopping, and visiting relatives in typically large extended families no longer living side by side as in rural areas or days of yore.

The introduction of minibuses, cellular phones, extended Sudanese television transmission, plus the availability for the middle and upper classes of satellite TV and the Internet, has visibly shifted the focus of daily activities from extended to nuclear families. For sure, in times of stress, relatives come together in solidarity vis-à-vis the world, but on a day-to-day basis, life in the large cities of Sudan resembles more and more that of midsize cities in the West.

Consequently, the “big men” so easily identifiable in rural areas are not found in large cities. If anything, they are being replaced by wellknown singers, famous poets, and the occasional entertainer. Businessmen and top professionals in medicine, law, and information technology are all concentrated in the capital region and, together with senior officials in the national government, have formed a new class in which everyone seems to know almost everyone else. Together they form what some refer to as the "political state" or the "ruling class".

== Urban and national elites ==
Sudan in the early 2000s did not yet have an urban national elite comparable to those of Egypt, Lebanon, Morocco, or Syria in the Arab world, or to Ethiopia, Kenya, and Nigeria in Africa. Small provincial elites were found in regional capitals in the sense that government, business, and tribal and religious leaders were recognized as being “above the rest,” but they did not constitute a distinct social class. Their roots were frequently in the countryside, and they maintained dual rural–urban identities as such.

These subregional mini-elites also seemed not to share significant elements of a common value system, and economic ties among them were tenuous. If a national society and elites were emerging, it was in the Three Towns constituting the national capital area. It was in Khartoum, Khartoum North, and Omdurman that the national politicians, high-level bureaucrats, senior military, educated professionals, and wealthy merchants and entrepreneurs lived, worked, and socialized. Even those who had residences elsewhere also maintained second family homes, especially in Omdurman.

These elites long recognized the usefulness of maintaining a presence in the capital area, traditionally living in Omdurman, a much more Arab city than Khartoum. The other truly urban elites also used to live in Omdurman until around 2000, but the concentration of the North's varied elites in one city did not necessarily engender a common social life. As in many Arab and African cities, much of Omdurman's population lived in separate if not wholly isolated quarters.

By the early 2000s, the capital region had become truly urbanized for the first time in Sudanese history, complete with high-rise buildings, overcrowding, and monumental traffic jams. The old and so-familiar former pattern of life, in which most educated Sudanese knew each other or knew at least someone in the other's family, was no longer possible. If there were an in-country elite, it consisted of senior military, senior civil servants, and senior academic figures alongside the new and rising business elite and those from the (also new) worlds of satellite TV and entertainment. Compared to Western societies, the Sudanese elite knew more about each other's families and lifestyles but did not interact very closely.

One part of the elite structure was not predominantly urban, however, although the family headquarters were located in the capital area. These were the heads of important religious groups, whose constituencies and sources of power and wealth were largely rural. Leaders of large tribes were based in their regions but maintained family homes in the capital, to which they commuted frequently and where some members of their usually very large families settled.

Most of the educated elite children whose families originated in outlying regions considered themselves to be “from Khartoum,” and the most educated, when asked about their identity, answered “Sudanese” first and foremost. This phenomenon was quite new, and it reflected disillusion with the politics and economics of the “old Sudan” in which regional, tribal, and sectarian affiliations mattered greatly, yet those political and social identities failed to deliver peace and prosperity and increasingly were blamed for the failures. To the extent that the elites were Muslim and Arab—most being both—they shared an overall religion and language but were otherwise marked by differences in interest and outlook.

Sudanese society did not develop a consensus, in terms of overarching values, as to what kinds of work, talents, possessions, and background were more worthy than others and therefore conferred higher status. For generations there were merchants, entrepreneurs, and religious leaders in Sudan. The latter enjoyed a special status through the 1980s but have declined visibly ever since. For example, the prestige of both the al-Mahdi and al-Mirghani families fell considerably as a result of failures of their political leaders in the last two to three decades. This was strikingly apparent in the strife-ridden region of Darfur, where all residents—victims and victimizers—not only were Muslims but also belonged to the same sect (Ansar), yet their leader, Sadiq al-Mahdi, had virtually no influence over these feuding factions. Indeed, his automobile was stoned by an enraged mob during a visit in 2004; such an event would have been unthinkable in the 1980s. In the Sudan of the early 2000s, wealth and the influence and power it generated came to carry greater status than traditional religious position.

The educated, secular elite was a newer phenomenon, and some deference was given its members by other elites. In the Muslim North, the educated ranged from devotees of Islamic activism to Islamic reformers and a few avowed secularists. Despite the respect generally given the educated, however, those at either extreme were likely to make members of other elites uncomfortable.

The younger, larger generation of the educated elite did not consist entirely of offspring of the older, smaller, educated elite. Many were sons (and sometimes daughters) of businessmen, wealthy landowners, and the tribal elite. A peculiar feature of the educated Sudanese was that large numbers lived outside Sudan for years at a time, working in Middle Eastern oil-producing states, Europe, or North America. Some of their earnings came back to Sudan, but it was not clear that they had much to do with the formation or characteristics of a specifically Sudanese elite.

Tribal and ethnic elites carried weight in specific localities and might be significant if the states were to achieve substantial autonomy; however, their importance on the national scene was questionable. That they were significant was apparent from what followed in the wake of an internal political realignment in the country's top leadership in 1999–2000, when some exiled politicians returned, as did some academics and well-established professionals from the oil-producing countries, Europe, North America, and even from Egypt, Kenya, and Uganda. The quid pro quo for their return was political amnesty in exchange for an understanding to refrain from attacking the government of al-Bashir and the National Congress Party.

Socializing and intermarriage among members of the different elites could be significant in establishing a cohesive upper class, but that had not happened by the early 2000s, except among a few at places such as the University of Khartoum. It was still easier for a male Sudanese intellectual to marry a non-Muslim Westerner than a Muslim from a different tribe and sect, although family acceptance of such a personal decision was on the increase.

After independence, the old elite regarded itself as the arbiter of social acceptance into the company of those riverine “Arab” families who had long lived in the Omdurman–Khartoum area, had substantial income from landholding, and had participated in the higher reaches of government during the Sudanese Condominium or engaged in professions of medicine, law, and the university. Men from these families were well educated. Few engaged in business, which tended to be in the hands of families of Lebanese, Syrian, Greek, and at least partial Egyptian ancestry.

Beginning in the late 1960s, in the North Muslims of non-Mediterranean background began to acquire substantial wealth as businessmen, often as importers and exporters. These men were relatively young when they began their entrepreneurial activity, and unlike members of the older elite families, they were not well educated. By the late 1970s and early 1980s, however, many of these businessmen had started sending their children to Britain or the United States for advanced degrees. Reflecting trends in other societies, whereas the sons of the older elite had been educated mainly for government careers, in and after the 1980s, business education was increasingly emphasized. In contrast to the more secular elites in the professions, the civil service, and the military, however, many members of these newer economic elites gravitated toward religion and the Muslim Brotherhood. By the early 2000s, almost the entire leadership of the Sudanese Islamists had graduate degrees, usually in applied sciences, and most often from Western universities.

The older elite typically used to intermarry and exclude those whose backgrounds they did not know, even if the families were wealthy and successful in business, religion, or education. Gradually, after independence, Arabic speakers of other sedentary families acquired higher education, entered the bureaucracy or founded lucrative businesses, and began to participate to a limited degree in the social circle of the older families. The emphasis on “good family” persisted, however, in most marriages. Sedentary “Arabs” were acceptable, as were some persons of an older mixture of “Arab” and Nile Nubian ancestry, for example, the people around Dongola. But people from the South and the West— even if Muslims—and members of nomadic groups (particularly the darker Baqqara Arabs) were not. A man from the South might be esteemed for his achievements and other qualities, but he was not considered an eligible husband for a woman of a sedentary Arab family. There are some exceptions in current times, as there were decades ago, but they are generally perceived as such.
