= Legal system of Sudan =

Sudanese legal system

The legal system of Sudan has evolved over time. The legacy of British colonial rule has had a significant impact even after independence. Most of the lawyers and judges were British trained and initially tended to rely on judicial precedent. Soon after independence, however, pressure began to build to change the legal system. By the time Jaafar Nimeiry seized power in 1969, a commission had been working on recommendations for a new system, but he dissolved it and formed another commission dominated by 12 Egyptian jurists. Based on recommendations received from them, Sudan adopted a new civil code that looked much like the Egyptian civil code of 1949. The new system was controversial because it disregarded existing laws and customs and introduced many new legal terms and concepts from Egyptian law without source material to interpret the codes. In 1973 the government repealed these codes and returned the legal system to its pre-1970 common-law status. In 1977 Nimeiry agreed to consider a Muslim Brotherhood demand that the system be based on Islam. He appointed al-Turabi as chairman of a committee to draft new Islamic laws. Nimeiry accepted few of the proposals from this committee. He then established a small, new group in 1983 that developed a “cut-and-paste” version of sharia laws based on practice in other countries. In September 1983, Nimeiry issued several decrees, known as the September Laws, which made sharia the law of the land.

Secular Muslims and the predominantly non-Muslim Southerners strongly opposed the imposition of Islamic law. Even before issuance of the September Laws, however, John Garang, the leader of the Sudan People's Liberation Movement (SPLM) had defected from the government and begun to organize Southern opposition to overthrow Nimeiry. The enforcement of hudud punishment, which included flogging and amputation of hands and feet, aroused widespread opposition to the Nimeiry government. Following Nimeiry's overthrow in 1985, the Swar al-Dahab government suspended the harshest hudud penalties. Both Swar al-Dahab and his democratically elected successor, Sadiq al-Mahdi, supported sharia but criticized its method of implementation by Nimeiry. By early 1989, a reluctant al-Mahdi expressed willingness to consider abrogation of the controversial sharia laws. This caused his coalition partner, al-Turabi and the National Islamic Front (NIF), to resign from the government in protest. Al-Mahdi announced that the cabinet would consider draft legislation repealing the September Laws on July 1, 1989, and would meet with SPLM leaders to resolve peacefully an end to the civil war. The military coup of June 1989 led by al-Bashir occurred only 24 hours before the al-Mahdi government was scheduled to vote on rescinding the September Laws.

The al-Bashir government initially retained the official freeze on implementation of the sharia laws but unofficially advised judges to apply them in preference to secular codes. Al-Bashir asked al-Turabi to prepare new laws based on Islamic principles. In January 1991, al-Bashir decreed that Islamic law would be applied in courts throughout the North, but not in the South. The 1998 constitution specified that the source of law for Sudan was sharia and national consent through voting in addition to the constitution and custom. In practice, Sudan treated Islam as the state religion and expected it to inspire the country's laws, institutions, and policies in the North. The Interim National Constitution was less emphatic on this point and stated explicitly that Sudan was a “multireligious country” where diversity meant coexistence. Nevertheless, the government continued to place restrictions on non-Muslims, non-Arab Muslims, and Muslims from tribes or sects not affiliated with the National Congress Party (NCP).

The CPA significantly altered the judicial structure in the North and created a new legal system for South Sudan, the states, and the national capital of Khartoum. The Interim National Constitution established an independent national judicial authority headed by a chief justice. The chief justice served as the president of the National Supreme Court and was answerable to the president of the republic. Structures of the national judiciary included the National Supreme Court, national courts of appeal, and other national courts. Nevertheless, the judiciary remained largely subservient to the president or the security forces, particularly in cases of crimes against the state.

== Courts ==
Since 1958 Sudan's various military governments have interfered with the judicial process. Following the military takeover in 1989, for example, the National Revolutionary Command Council (RCC) issued a decree that gave the president power to appoint and dismiss all judges. Al-Bashir dismissed many, apparently because they were insufficiently committed to applying sharia in their decisions, and replaced them with supporters of the NIF. The judiciary effectively became responsible to the president or security forces.

The National Supreme Court was the highest in the land. It was the court of final appeal and review concerning any criminal, civil, or administrative matter arising out of national laws or personal matters. It had criminal jurisdiction over the justices of the Constitutional Court and could review death sentences imposed by any court. The president of the Republic appointed the chief justice and members of the National Supreme Court on the advice of the Supreme Judicial Council. The chief justice served as the president of the National Supreme Court and presided over the National Judicial Service Commission (NJSC), which was responsible for the overall management of the national judiciary. The NJSC regulated relations between the judiciaries at the national, South Sudan, and state level. In the case of South Sudan, the NJSC consulted with the president of the Supreme Court of South Sudan. The National Supreme Court consisted of 70 judges operating through panels consisting of three judges. It reached decisions by majority opinion, subject to revision only if and when the chief justice concluded that a judgment infringed sharia laws. Four circuits of the National Supreme Court operated outside the capital in the Western, Central, and Eastern states.

A separate Constitutional Court of nine justices served as the custodian of the constitution. The court had jurisdiction to interpret the constitution and original jurisdiction to decide disputes that arose under the constitution and the constitutions of Northern states. It decided on appeals against the decision of the Supreme Court of South Sudan, the Interim Constitution of South Sudan, and the constitutions of states in the South. It heard cases involving human rights and fundamental freedoms and adjudicated the constitutionality of laws or provisions by the Interim National Constitution, the Interim Constitution of South Sudan, and relevant state constitutions. The Constitutional Court adjudicated constitutional disputes between levels and organs of government and had criminal jurisdiction over the president of the republic, vice presidents, speakers of the National Legislature, and the justices of the National Supreme Court and Supreme Court of South Sudan. The president of the Republic appointed the president of the Constitutional Court and all justices upon recommendation of the NJSC and subject to the approval of a two-thirds majority of all the representatives of the Council of States.

According to the Interim National Constitution, the number, competencies, and procedures of the national courts of appeal would be determined by law. In 2010–11 Sudan had some 130 judges in courts of appeal that functioned in 28 appeal circuits throughout the country, each one consisting of three judges. They reached decisions by majority opinion and dealt with appeals against the preliminary and appellate decisions of the public courts and the preliminary judgments of first-level courts in civil, criminal, and personal cases. National courts of appeal occasionally overturned decisions of lower courts in political cases, especially from the public courts, which consisted of a single judge. The public courts had appellate jurisdiction over judgments of magistrates of third and second grade in criminal cases.

In 2005 there were 133 public-court judges and 397 district courts of the first instance. Civil and criminal codes passed in the 1980s and 1990s prescribed their powers. There were 98 town courts, 67 intermediate courts, and 897 rural courts. Local citizens chose the members of these courts from among prominent residents such as tribal chiefs and local sheiks. Their distinctive feature was the application of customary law so long as it was consistent with Sudan's laws and public policy. These courts normally resolved problems through conciliation and dealt with disputes over the pasture, water, and farmland. They tended to be located in remote areas where there were no district courts. Sudan theoretically abolished special security courts in 2003 only to create three special courts in Darfur under the state of emergency to try crimes against the state. For example, one of these courts consisted of a three-judge bench composed of two military personnel and a civilian prosecutor appointed by the armed forces. It followed military rather than civilian procedures. Military trials, which sometimes were secret and brief, did not provide procedural safeguards. These courts ceased functioning in 2009. The Special Courts Act (1989) created three-person security courts to deal with violations of constitutional decrees, emergency regulations, and some penal code sections. Special courts, composed primarily of civilian judges, handled most security-related cases. Sentences usually were severe and implemented immediately.

== Sharia law ==
Sharia is not a fixed set of ideas. There are substantially different interpretations of sharia in Sudan and other countries concerning what it is or should be. During Sudan's relatively brief independent history, Islamic authorities approached it from varying points of view. Long traditions of Sufism and Mahdism influenced these debates. In more recent decades, the impetus for sharia tended to come from the Muslim Brotherhood and the NIF led by al-Turabi. Other key political figures, including Sadiq al-Mahdi and former president Nimeiry, were also instrumental at various points in promoting sharia in what is known as September Laws.

The U.S. Department of State 2009 International Religious Freedom Report on Sudan estimated the country's Muslim population at 70 percent. Muslims constituted the overwhelming majority in the North, although there were sizable Christian communities in the major cities, especially Khartoum. Sudanese who believed in traditional religions and Christians predominated in the South. The 1998 constitution provided for freedom of religion but treated Islam as a state religion and cited sharia as one of the sources of legislation. Differences over the application of sharia for non-Muslims were one of the root causes of the civil war between the North and the South. As a result, with an end to the conflict, the Interim National Constitution underscored the diversity of religious beliefs in Sudan.

Sharia remained a source of legislation in the 15 states of the North. Sudan's Code of Criminal Procedure, in accordance with sharia, authorized hudud punishments in the North, although the severest forms were not being implemented as of 2011. The consumption of alcohol was punishable by 40 lashes for a Muslim and 20 lashes for a Christian. Islamic family law applied to Muslims in Sudan. A Muslim woman did have the right to hold and dispose of her own property without interference, and women were guaranteed inheritance from their parents; but certain Islamic law provisions discriminated against women. A widow inherited only one-eighth of her husband's estate; of the remaining seven-eights, two-thirds went to the sons and one-third to the daughters. It was much easier for men to initiate legal divorce proceedings than for women. Although a Muslim man might marry a non-Muslim woman, a Muslim woman could not marry a non-Muslim man unless he converted to Islam. Women were instructed to dress modestly according to Islamic standards, including wearing a head covering; but there was minimal enforcement of the dress code. Converting from Islam to another religion was considered apostasy under sharia and was punishable by death in the North. In practice, the penalty was not carried out; by the end of 2010, the last case of apostasy prosecuted was in 1985 under the Nimeiry government and involved a Mahmoud Mohammed Taha who questioned Islamic beliefs but did not attempt to convert to another religion.

The national government did condone some discriminatory practices against Christians living in the North. The government required, for example, that all students in the North study Islam in school even if they were not Muslim. In the twenty-first century, however, there was a general improvement in religious freedom in the North.
