= Women in Sudan =

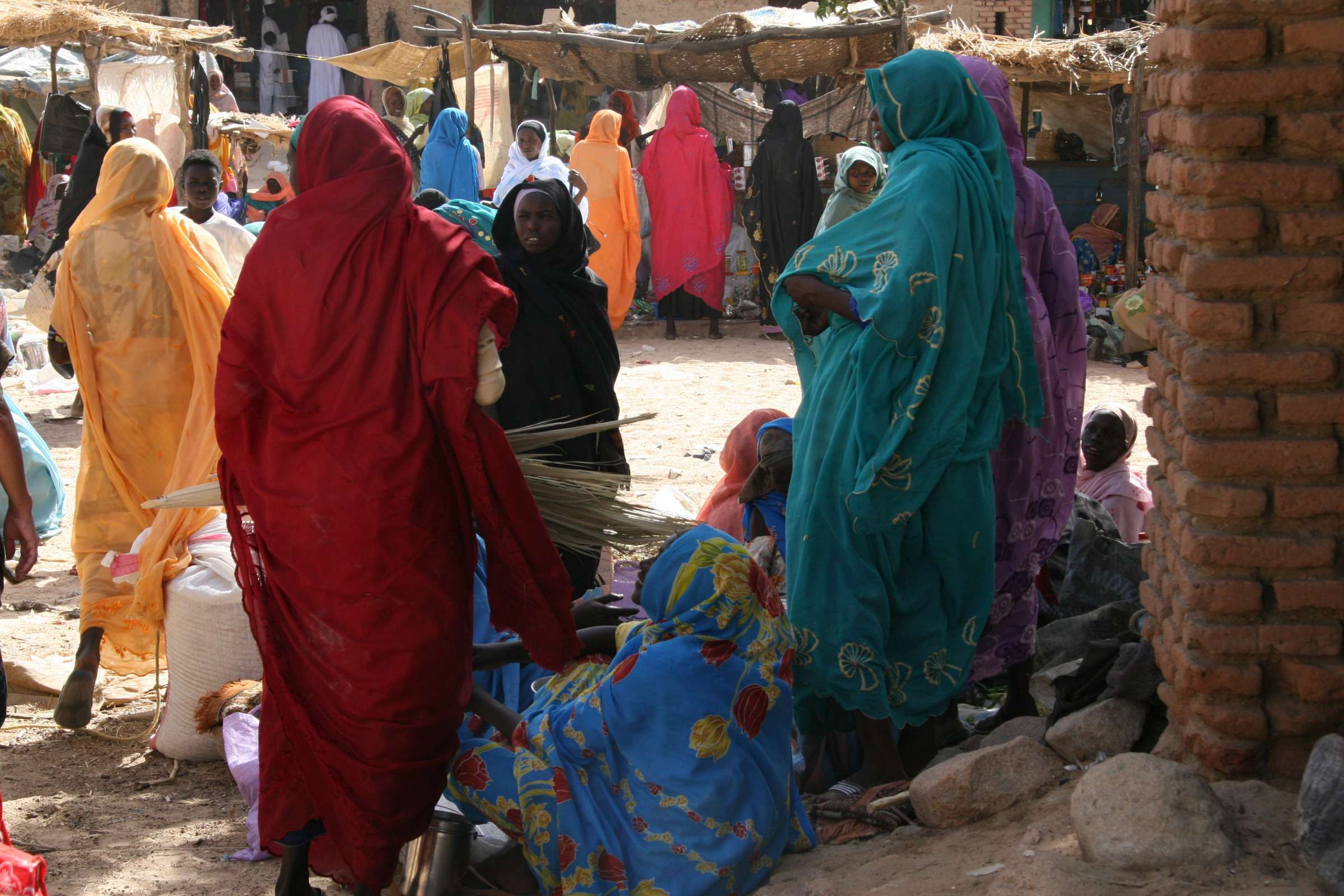
Market sellers in Darfur, Sudan

Sudan is a developing nation that faces many challenges in regard to gender inequality. Freedom House gave Sudan the lowest possible ranking among repressive regimes during 2012. South Sudan received a slightly higher rating but it was also rated as "not free". In the 2013 report of 2012 data, Sudan ranks 171st out of 186 countries on the Human Development Index (HDI). Sudan also is one of very few countries that are not a signatory on the Convention on the Elimination of All Forms of Discrimination Against Women (CEDAW).

Despite this, there have been positive changes in regard to gender equality in Sudan. As of 2012, women embodied 24.1% of the National Assembly of Sudan. Sudanese women account for a larger percentage of the national parliament than in many Western nations. Still, gender inequalities in Sudan, particularly as they pertain to female genital mutilation and the disparity of women to men in the labor market, have been met with concern in the international community. In the aftermath of the Sudanese revolution of 2018/19, where women played an important role in the opposition to the former government, a number of laws have been changed and women have been appointed for leading positions in the transitional government.

== Historical background ==
Due to its geographic situation, the population of Sudan is both "Arab" and "African", with much complexity that involves terms of ethnicity and identity politics. A variety of governments have ruled within the last two centuries: colonial regimes such as Ottoman and Anglo-Egyptian, Islamic states (the Funj and the Mahdist), parliamentary democracies (1956–1989), and military regimes until 2019.

=== 19th century ===
Although there is only scant information on gender relationships before and during the Turkiyya and the Mahdiyya, some sources claim that women served as couriers in the opposition against the Ottoman government. Moreover, they took care of wounded people, informed about enemy movements as spies for the Sudanese opposition, and incited men to act with bravery.

During the Mahdiyya period, women's public activities and economic roles were largely restricted to rural areas, where women were granted more social roles than those in the towns. In the urban areas, women were often confined to living areas reserved for women and children, and had hardly any possibilities to get an education. Following Mahdist religious interpretations, women had to cover their heads and avoid personal contact with men outside the family. Furthermore, men and women were ordered to avoid Western types of clothing.

=== 21st century ===
==== Darfur region ====
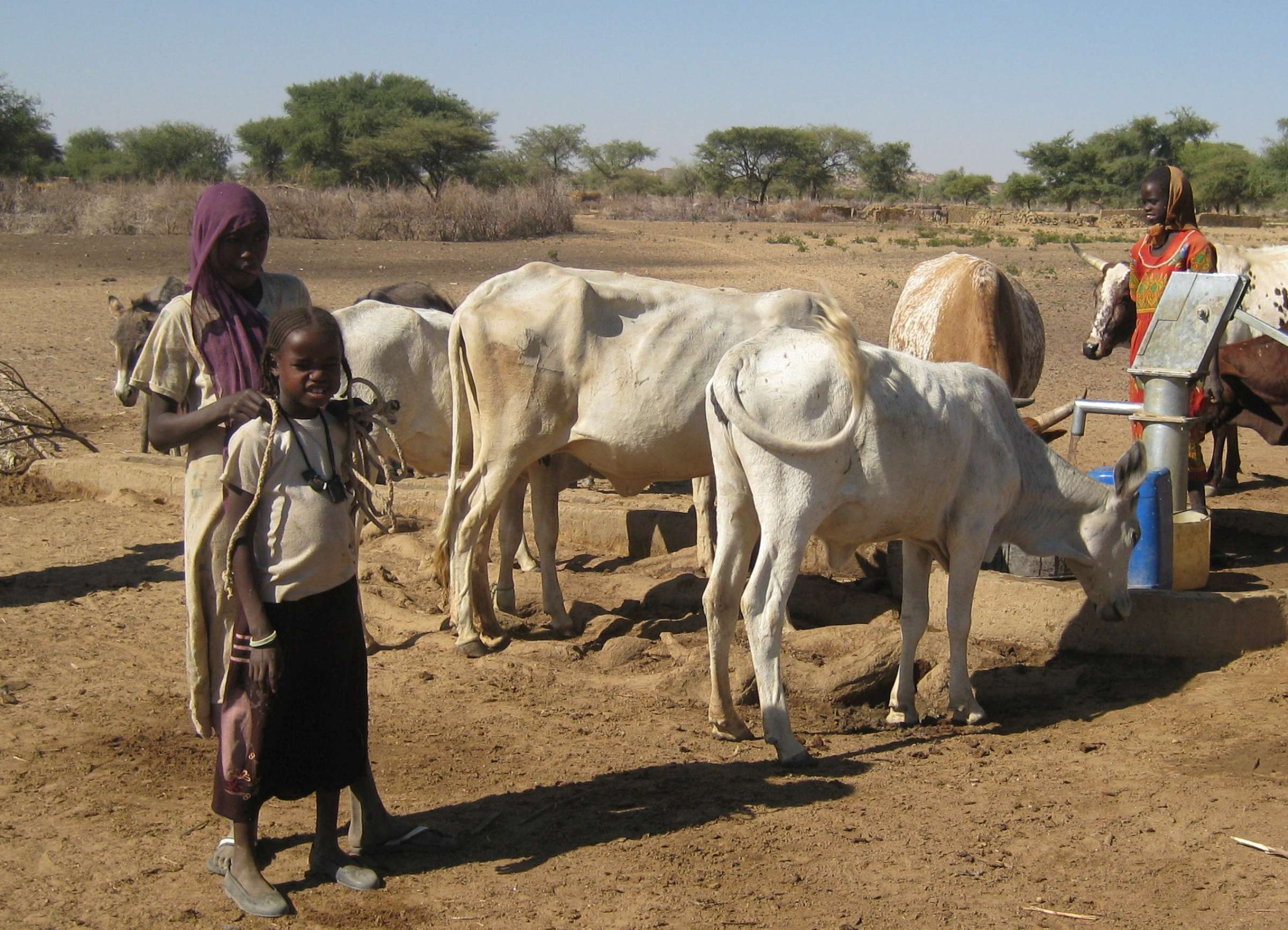
Cattle watering in Darfur

Conflict and gender-based violence occurred in Darfur even after the 2006 Darfur Peace Agreement (DPA). Before the peace agreement, rebel factions and bandits in Darfur killed and abducted civilians, humanitarian workers, and United Nations – African Union Mission in Darfur (UNAMID) personnel.

A panel of experts at the United Nations found, in 2005, that sexual and gender-based violence occurred throughout Darfur. At this time, there were non-governmental organizations that worked to stop this gender violence. However, the government expelled thirteen NGOs that resulted in the closure of most gender-based violence programs. Before the independence of South Sudan in 2011, the Interim National Constitution in the Darfur area explicitly prohibited discrimination based on gender. However, according to the 2009 Human Rights Report published by the U.S. State Department, the Sudanese government did not effectively enforce this provision.

According to a report by UN Women, since the start of the 2023 conflict in Sudan, large numbers of women, children and other vulnerable groups have been affected by forced displacement, sexual and other forms of violence. At the same time, Sudanese women have assumed leading roles in humanitarian action and the promotion of an end to the conflict.

=== Independence of South Sudan ===
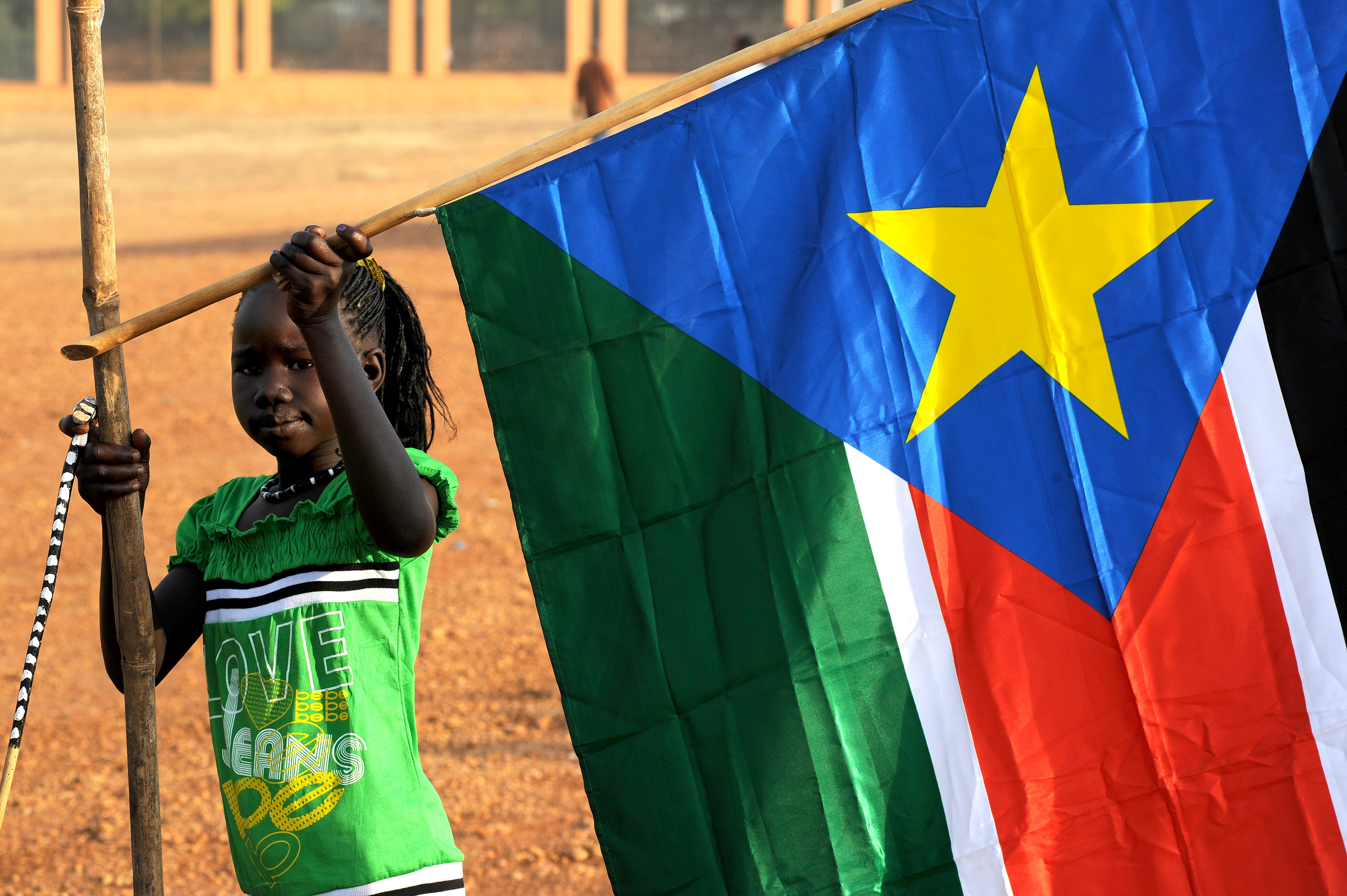
A young girl hanging the flag of South Sudan

Before the separation of South Sudan, Sudan was Africa's largest country by land area and a producer of crude oil. On January 9, 2011, the population of the southern states of Sudan voted to become formally independent of the North. 98% of the approximate eight-million voters chose to become independent.

This separation was the result of Sudan's failure to democratize and the flawed implementation of the 2005 Comprehensive Peace Agreement (CPA). This agreement ended the longest civil conflict on the continent. Ever since the decolonization of Sudan in the 1950s, the "predominantly black and Christian or animist South had sought either autonomy or independence from the Arabic-speaking, Muslim-dominated North". The quest for oil-wealth was also a factor in the conflict within Sudan. Democracy was never given a chance to succeed, because no multiparty election had produced a stable government and three elected governments had been overthrown by military coups.

== Gender studies and micro-credit schemes ==
Studies of gender inequality in Sudan have gone through two basic stages, according to Seteny Shami. The early stage, characterized by the neglect of women as a research priority, can be related to development conceptions in the post-independence period, from 1956 until the 1970s. Women-related issues were seldom given research attention and, when studied, were dealt with in a cursory and superficial manner that neglected some of their fundamental dimensions.

The second stage began with the declaration of the United Nations Decade for Women in 1975. This was characterized by a reversal of the early stage's trends and a new interest in research on women. This research, however, aimed at using the funds pouring in from international agencies to set up 'women's projects', rather than actually seeking to improve the welfare of the women in a sustainable way.

One of these projects that was very influential was called sandug (Arabic for box or chest), which is an association of rotating credit groups. Sandugs are composed of small groups of women, who trust each other and are thus accountable for each other's credit-worthiness. This was an early form of micro-credit for women who needed money for an unexpected expense or for business purposes. The sandugs in Sudan differ in the number of members, the amount of the contribution, the form of the contribution, and the duration of the loans.

Since 1983, the Sudanese Women's Union has been instrumental in setting up the Housewives' Organization. Among other goals, this organization has tried to facilitate access to rare consumer goods at reasonable prices.

== Gender-related legislation ==
Since 1983, the legal system of Sudan is pluralistic: Sharia (Islamic religious law), civil, and customary law have coexisted for nearly a century.

As of 2013, Sudan was one of only six countries in the world that had not signed the Convention on the Elimination of All Forms of Discrimination Against Women (CEDAW). CEDAW is an international convention adopted in 1979 by the United Nations General Assembly. This international bill of rights for women sets basic standards that must be implemented to promote gender equality. Sudan's stance at the time indicated the lack of importance of gender equality.

In November 2019, Abdalla Hamdok's transitional government repealed all laws restricting women's freedom of dress, movement, association, work and study. On 22 April 2020, the Sovereignty Council of Sudan issued an amendment to its criminal legislation, which declares that anyone who performs Female Genital Mutilation (FGM) either in a medical establishment or elsewhere will be punished by three years' imprisonment and a fine.

== Education ==
The difference in education between boys and girls is one of the most obvious and critical inequalities in Sudan. Girls in general just learn how to read and write and some simple arithmetic and exit school when they reach puberty, which coincides with six years of primary school. The Gender Parity Index in primary education in Sudan as of 2006 was 0.8. This index is used to measure the relative access to education of males and females. The gender parity index is calculated first by determining the population of official school age for each level of education. Then, the Gross Enrollment Ratio would be calculated and the number of students enrolled in each level is divided by the population of official school age children. The result is multiplied by one hundred. This is all separate for girls and boys. "The Gender parity index is then calculated by dividing the female Gross Enrollment Ratio by the male Gross Enrollment Ratio for the given level of education." A lot of educational and classification information is needed for this calculation, thus as of 2012 there are eight United Nations countries that do not collect the necessary data to compute the gender parity index.

The female population with at least a secondary education in 2010 was 12.8% for females compared with 18.2% for males. Although both of these are very low, males have a statistically more significant opportunity to obtain a secondary education.

The first class of students to complete studies at the university dates from 1930. In 2017, women are the majority in universities (52% compared to 48% for men). Although the desire to educate oneself is a primary motivation, the need for additional income in an economic context where the income of the head of the family is no longer sufficient pushes women to go to university in order to find a job afterwards. One example is for the discipline of archaeology, as Ghalia Garelnabi has commented to The Guardian, gender diversity in archaeology in Sudan has increased in her lifetime: during her studies there were three women on the course, but in 2022 there were 20.

== Health ==
Women in Sudan do not have the same access to healthcare that men do. One critical measure of the access to basic healthcare services is the maternal mortality rate. This defines the death of pregnant women and is directly related to the levels of available healthcare services. In 2008, the maternal mortality rate in Sudan was 750 per 100,000 live births. Comparatively, the rate for a developed nation like the United States is 9.1 per 100,000 live births. The adolescent fertility rate is a part of the Millennium Development Goals. The adolescent fertility rate is a measurement of adolescent births per 1,000 women. This is a general indicator of the burden of fertility on young women in a country. The rate for Sudan in 2011 was 61.9 per 1,000. Reproductive health is another critical component of women's health in Sudan. The contraceptive prevalence rate of married women ages 15–49 in 2009 was 8%. Comparatively, the rate for the same population of women in the United States at the same time was 73%. The rate of women with at least one antenatal visit from 2005 to 2009 was 64%. Also, the rate of births by a skilled health professional from 2005 to 2009 was 49% in Sudan. Finally, the Total fertility rate for women in Sudan in 2011 was 4.2. This is the average number of children that would be born to a woman over her lifetime assuming normal conditions.

== Religion ==
=== Religious background ===
Religion is very influential on the culture of Sudan with 97% of the population adhering to Islam. Since religion is so influential in society it provides the structure of gender roles. The attitudes of Muslim men towards women are mainly governed by religious precepts. In the Koran, Sura 4:34, it is said that men have authority over women because Allah has made the one superior to the other because they spend their wealth to maintain them. Traditional societal rules are established in Sudan that describe the role of women. This is particularly obvious in the case of religious marriage. If the husband dies, the widow either marries again and gives up her children to the husband's family or remains a widow for the rest of her life. In Sudanese society, a widow is socially respected if she behaves according to the traditional rules and regulations of the society.

=== Islamist goals ===
There has been a rise of "Islamism" in Muslim northern Sudan since 1971, and particularly its gender dimension, is meaningful. According to Sondra Hale, there are a variety of goals and strategies that this rise of Islam includes. These are: to manipulate religious ideology toward a more "authentic" culture, to represent, reiterate, or reinforce the centrality of women within that "authentic" culture, to create a new trend in the gender division of labor or to stem recent changes within that labor system, and to purge from an "authentic" women's culture particular non-Islamic customs that "weaken the morals" of women. In 1989 there was a consolidation of Islamist power that changed the "formal and informal national and local debates" about gender, law, and labor. The government of Sudan wanted to appear more modern and propagandized women's education and work participation. Before this, there was more direct involvement of the Sudanese government by the mosque of Islam. Since 1989, Islam is still very influential but the Sudanese government has made attempts of modernization. According to Afshar however, her studies indicate that it is the ideologies of male supremacy rather than any specific religion that affects women's lives more directly.

== Economic participation ==
=== Background on the economy ===
The economy of Sudan is composed of a mostly male workforce. In one factory in 1981, women workers were making about 70% of a male machinist's pay. This, however, does not amount to the majority of labor opportunities for women in Sudan. This is because most civilization in Sudan is rural and there has not been much foreign direct investment to spur more industrial economic opportunities. The majority of women participate in agricultural activities, and most of them are making an "unrecognizable" contribution. Afshar's main argument is that women should have a more productive role in the development process to "counteract the destructive politics of food, and the spread of hunger to the rural areas." Women must concentrate on providing food for the household, in addition (at many times) to providing much of the financial support for the family.

In 2012, 30.9% of Sudanese women were working in the ‘formal’ workforce, compared with 76.9% of men.

Women's role in land ownership also varies in Sudan. There is diversity in the country, institutional, and political context in regard to gender in land transactions.

=== Gender division of labor in agriculture ===
According to Shami, at least 87% of Sudan's female labor force was concentrated in agriculture. Of these, 78%-90% were involved in the traditional subsistence sector, whereas only 10% are involved in the modern sector.

Subsistence (family labor) farming is primarily unpaid labor that is limits the economic participation of the worker. The majority of family labor is performed by women and children. According to Haleh Afshar, family labor is based on kinship relationships where the norm dictates a sense of communal labor. Paid labor is based on a contractual understanding between the farmer and worker. Women in Sudan are often not given opportunities to manage subsistence plots on their own. A primary limitation to gender equality in Sudan is the necessity of obtaining the credit which is needed to manage a farm. Credit (shail in Sudan) is extended culturally only to men by shopkeepers and merchants, and males are termed 'farmers' with women called 'farm workers' even though both work on farms.

While the paid income goes to men in the villages, it is not necessarily spent or invested in the family, nor does it always go towards farm improvements. Certain market conditions in Sudan seem likely to result in the growing equality of male and female workers; however, this has not been the case. The case of Sudan is unique in that land is plentiful and labor is limited. Despite this shortfall of labor, women are not encouraged to participate in modernized agriculture.

=== Subsistence farming ===
In Sudan, subsistence women farmers face economic development limitations. There is an inconsistency between the policy goals in agricultural improvement and the resulting demise of women farmers.

Although women are not expected to work for pay or have a profession, there are sometimes opportunities to earn income as long as it is 'assisting' the household financially. These women are allowed to work at home and in the fields with the cultural understanding that this is not a profession. Women are publicly and culturally relegated to a position inferior to that of men and there is an assumption that division of work along sex lines prevails, according to Haleh Afshar.

Although women play a crucial role in the agricultural cycle, their role has not improved as a result of technology in the agricultural sector. It tends to concentrate on the production of cash crops, and women are not encouraged to participate in this activity.

== Political participation ==
Sudanese women obtained the right to vote in 1964.

Despite the enormous cultural and economic limitations of women in Sudan, women comprise 24.1% of the national parliament as of 2012. This percentage, however, does not represent the number of women in positions of power throughout the country. Many other nations (developed and developing) have similar percentages of women in politics. Alazaa Mohamad Abdullah was the first woman in Sudan to attend political courts in 1924. Also, Khalda Zahir Sarour Alsadat was one of the first women in power involved in politics. She performed clear political activities as a student and helped establish the Sudanese Women's Union in 1952.

== Social and cultural norms ==
There are a variety of social obligations required of women in Sudan that are not necessary for men. These range from birth, marriage, female genital mutilation, and the performance of family death rituals. These rituals require physical, mental, and time commitments that are not responsibly of men. The obligations of family rituals are directly aligned with the women in the household. Often, women are required to perform the rituals in addition to their daily chores. In cases of marriage rituals, the invited women are expected to literally shut-down their houses for the duration of the festivities and move to the place where the rituals are being held.

=== Household ===
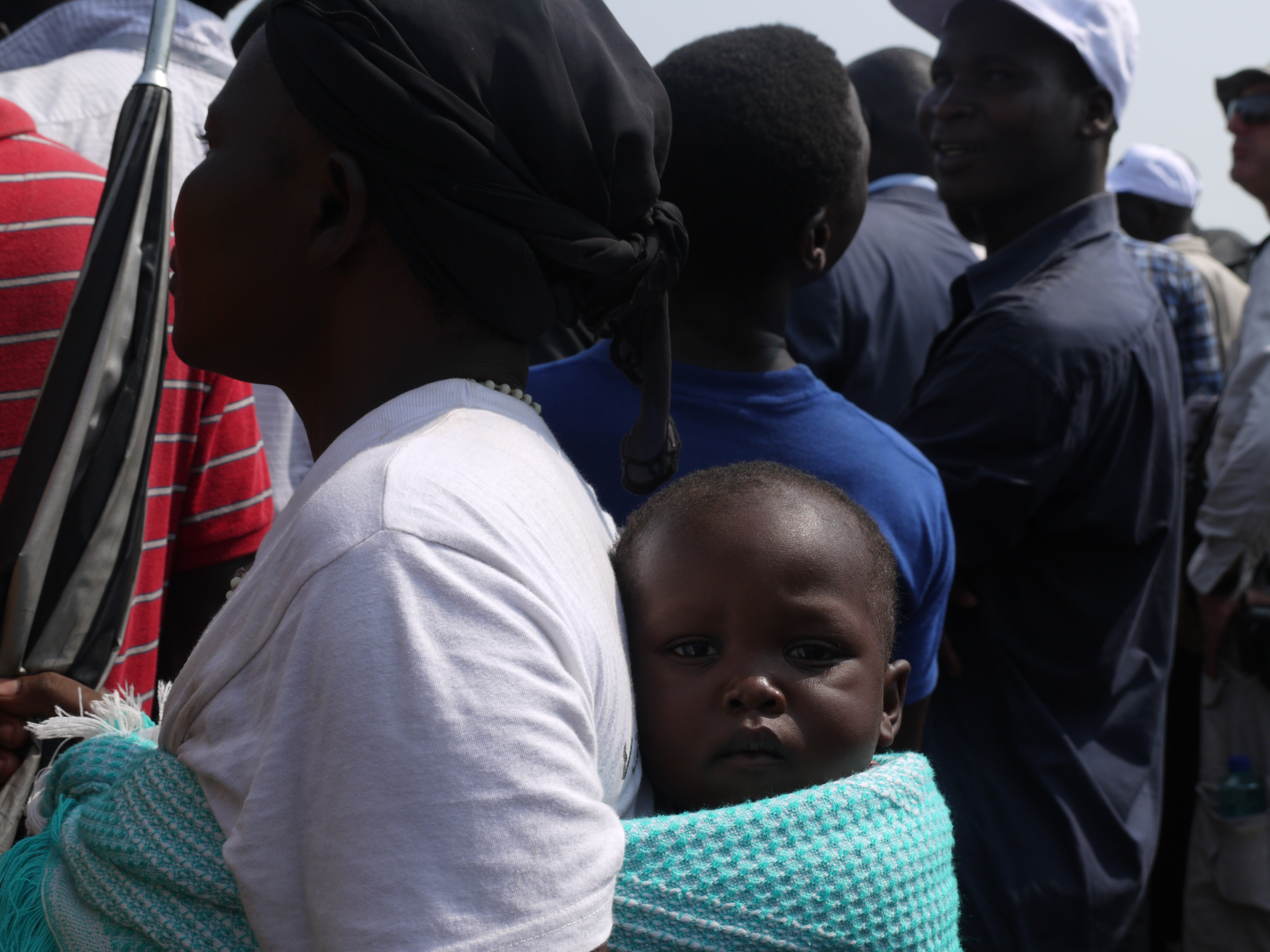
Mother and child in Sudan

Symbolically the 'house' represents and reflects the woman's overall role in a historically male 'structure'. Even within the confines of their compound though, conformity of dress, manner of speech, and tone of voice, are required and expected. This expected subservience is based in cultural and social norms and deviations to these are not allowed.

In July 2020, the need for women to obtain permission from a male relative to travel was abolished.

=== Beauty rituals ===
Dukhan (scented smoke bath) and dilka (scented massage) are two beauty rituals that are expected to be performed by women.

=== Female genital mutilation ===
In Sudan, feminine identities are created and re-created through a multiplicity of gender ideologies and ritual practices. One of the most unexpected signs of identity transformation of women in South Sudan is their adoption of female genital mutilation, which was almost never practiced in the South but was nearly universal in the North.

There are four primary types of this practice that is also sometimes called female genital cutting or female circumcision. The first type involves removing the entire clitoral hood. The second strategy includes removal of the clitoris and the inner labia. The third type "(also known as infibulation) includes the removal of all or part of the inner and outer labia, and usually the clitoris, and the fusion of the wound, leaving a small hole for the passage of urine and menstrual blood—the fused wound is opened for intercourse and childbirth." The fourth type of genital mutilation includes a variety of other procedures from piercing to full vaginal cutting.

This action exemplifies a horizontal transmission of tradition, not from one generation to another within an ethno-cultural group but from one group to another in newly shared circumstances. In embracing female circumcision, women depart from their own cultural traditions and reshape their personhood as well as their bodies. Ninety-one percent of the female population in the North of Sudan still adhere to this practice, according to Rogaia Abusharaf.

During colonial rule, British authorities were apprehensive that southern women would accept this female genital mutilation, which colonial officials regarded as not only alien to the South but also inherently repulsive. For females, circumcision comprises a variety of ritualized surgeries, including clitoridectomy, excision, and infibulation, all of which have been performed for thousands of years.

Many international organizations have targeted female genital mutilation as a practice that needs to be eradicated. The World Health Organization (WHO) has done much research on the societal factors contribution to this procedure. Much of this research is through interviewing in order to create educational campaigns to deter it in the future. One study was conducted by the WHO in 1997 in Sudan. Their results showed that social pressure, particularly from older women, had a great influence on the decision to perform this cutting.

Two-thirds of the women said that this procedure was done "to satisfy the husband", but none of the women said their husband had made the decision on their own. Through research like this, the World Health Organization, in addition to other organizations, have targeted education of young women in these rural areas as a primary criterion to stop female genital mutilation.

In 2014, they found that in Sudan, "86.6% women aged 15-49 underwent genital mutilation"(CBS and UNICEF, 2016). Many of these women did not have much of a choice, since the government would not get rid of it for a while, making it seem as if they were 'religious practices'(Tonnessen et Al-Nagar, 2024). Although there are different opinions on why they created it, some say to 'protect women' from other men, some say for their husbands, some have certain views of it showcasing a sign of "fertility", and some say it was placed to "ensure women keep their virginity before marriage"(Ahmed, 2019). Overall, genital mutilation of women is violence against women. Many men who were interviewed even mentioned how they would not want to be with someone who has had it, but "64.5% want their future daughters to be able to get it done"(Akbas et al.,2019). This shows how this seems to be a way to 'control' women in some way.

On 1 May 2020, the Sudanese government decided to amend the country's criminal code, which had been approved on 22 April 2020, in order to criminalize female genital mutilation, making it punishable by three years in jail and a fine.

=== Marriage ===
In 2018, a 19-year-old girl named Noura Hussein was sentenced to death by hanging for fatally stabbing her husband after he attempted to rape her again. A social media campaign by liberal activists both in and outside of Sudan was initiated to pressure the Sudanese government to overturn the sentence, with the hashtag #JusticeForNoura trending on Twitter. Following an international backlash, Hussein's sentence was overturned.

Polygamy is permitted in Sudan. A man can have up to four wives, unless the woman he married first notifies the exclusion of polygamy in the marriage contract. Within the couple, the husband holds all rights; the wife has no legal existence and is not taxable on her personal assets.

=== Clothes ===
Article 152 of the Sudanese Penal Code of 1991 penalizes the wearing of "indecent or immoral clothing". Under this law, on July 3, 2009, 13 women were arrested in Khartoum for wearing pants. Ten of them pleaded guilty and were punished with 10 lashes and a fine of 250 Sudanese pounds. Of these 13 women, three were under 18 years old.

On November 26, 2019, the government abolished the law on public order and morals which prohibited, among other things, women from wearing pants. But these new social gains are being called into question by the new government after the 2021 coup d'état

== Measurement of gender inequality ==
=== Gender Inequality Index ===
The Gender Inequality Index is a measurement of gender disparity that was introduced in the 2010 Human Development Report. Human Development Indices are relative classifications across the 187 countries denoted as very high, high, medium (each with 47 countries) and low (with 46 countries). The 2013 United Nations Development Programme (UNDP) report ranks Sudan as the #129 country out of 147 on the gender inequality index. This is in the low human development quartile. This index ranking is a calculation of maternal mortality rate, adolescent fertility rate, females in the national parliament, population with at least a secondary education, and the labor force participation rate. The figures from the 2012 UNDP report of Sudan compared to the average of the countries in the "Low Human Development" category are below.

| | GII Value | Maternal Mortality Rate | Adolescent Fertility Rate | Seats in National Parliament (female) | Population with Secondary Education (female) | Population with Secondary Education (male) | Labor Force Participation Rate (female) | Labor Force Participation Rate (male) |
|---|---|---|---|---|---|---|---|---|
| LHD Average | 0.578 | 405 | 86.0 | 19.2 | 18.0 | 32.0 | 56.4 | 79.9 |
| Sudan | 0.604 | 730 | 53.0 | 24.1 | 12.8 | 18.2 | 30.9 | 76.5 |

The disparity between women and men in the labor force is particularly disconcerting. 76.9% of men are active in the 'formal' labor force compared to that of women, 30.9%. Thus, nearly 50% more men participate in economic activities compared to women. Sudan ranks lower in all of the categories than the average low human development country except for the adolescent fertility rate and in female seats in the national assembly.

== See also ==
- Sudanese feminism
  - Sudanese Women's Union
  - No to Oppression against Women Initiative
  - MANSAM
- History of Sudan
- Human rights in Sudan
- South Sudan
- Women in South Sudan
- Women in Africa
- Thuraya al-Tuhamy – Sudanese women's rights activist (1948–2020)
