= September Laws (Sudan) =

Sharia laws in Sudan

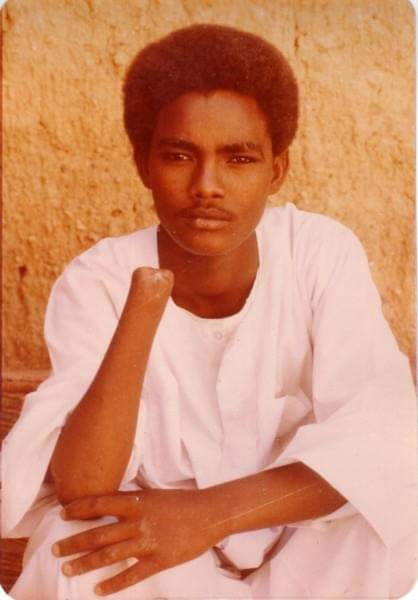
Abdul Rahman Ali

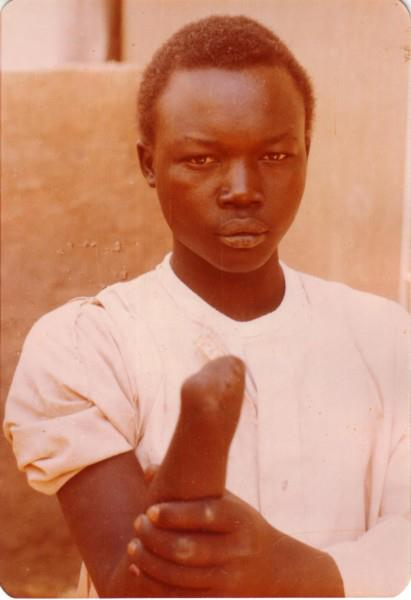
Idris Al-Nur Koko

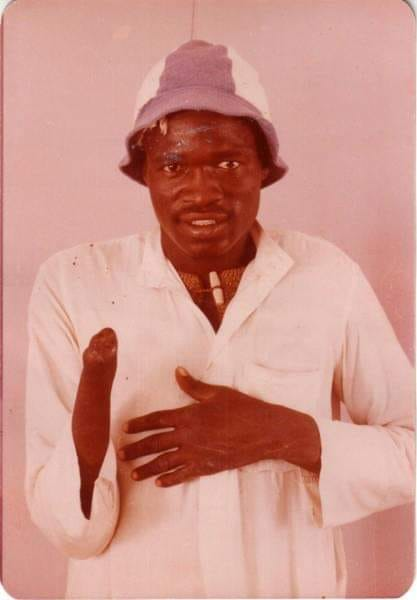
Garang Deng Bol

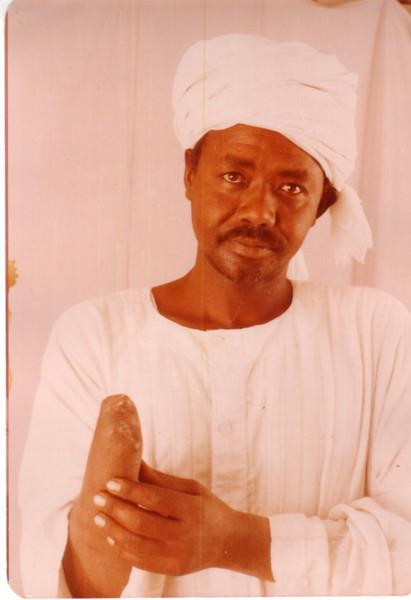
Al-Amin Kabashi

Images of some of the survivors of the September 1983 Laws after amputation according to Sharia law. The images were taken by Peter Anton von Arnim in 1986

In September 1983, president Gaafar Nimeiry introduced Islamic sharia laws in Sudan, known as September Laws (Arabic: قوانين سبتمبر, romanized: Qawānīn Sibtambir), disposing of alcohol and implementing hudud punishments such as public flogging for alcohol consumption and amputations for theft. Nimeiry declared himself the "imam of the Sudanese umma", leading to concerns about the undemocratic implementation of these laws. Hassan al-Turabi (then the attorney general) assisted with drafting the laws and later supported the laws, unlike the leader of the opposition Sadiq al-Mahdi.

Nimeiry's alliance with the Sudanese Muslim Brotherhood aimed to end sectarian divisions and consolidate Islamic governance. Despite Nimeiry's assertion that the sharia laws reduced crime rates, his economic policies, including Islamic banking, led to severe economic issues in Sudan, including high inflation and substantial external debt. This led to his removal in 1985, and the law was frozen during the transition to democracy between 1985 and 1989.

Ultimately, Nimeiry's Islamic policies contributed to the Second Sudanese Civil War in southern Sudan in 1983, ending the Addis Ababa Agreement of 1972, which had granted Southern Sudan regional autonomy and recognised the diversity of the Sudanese society. This shift towards Islamic governance played a crucial role in Sudan's political landscape with multiple parties including the National Islamic Front advocating for Islamic laws during the Omar al-Bashir era between 1989 and 2019.

== Background ==
As part of the terms for national reconciliation in 1977 between president Gaafar Nimeiry and Sadiq al-Mahdi, the leader of the National Front, a requirement was the reassessment of Sudanese legislation and a review of the 1972 Addis Ababa Agreement, which had authorised self-governance for the southern region.

By 1977, a committee was working to align Sudanese laws with the sharia, and the Muslim Brotherhood, headed by Hassan al-Turabi, a professor of constitutional law at the University of Khartoum, was gaining influence in university student political groups. The al-Turabi committee concluded that only 10% of the laws adhered to the sharia. However, legislative attempts to Islamise the law through the People's Assembly were met with resistance.

In 1979, a longstanding dispute between the Sudanese Muslim Brotherhood and the main Muslim Brotherhood organisation re-emerged. At that time, al-Turabi, serving as the attorney general, refused to pledge loyalty to the International Muslim Brotherhood, resulting in a division. Sheikh Sadiq al-Mahdi and his supporters sided with al-Turabi, causing a split within the organisation. Although Youssef Nour al-Daim had assumed leadership of the Sudanese Brotherhood in 1969, it remained a smaller faction with restricted influence. Al-Turabi named his faction the "Sudanese Islamic Movement".

Between 1977 and 1985, Nimeiry's implemented an "Islamic approach" in Sudan, which aimed to end sectarian divisions, especially the al-Mirghani and al-Mahdi rivalry, and consolidate Islamic governance. His transition from nationalist leftist ideologies to a stricter Islamic stance was documented in his books The Islamic approach, why? and The Islamic approach, how? The link between the revival of Islam and his efforts to reconcile with opponents of the 1976 coup attempt coincided with the emergence of militant Islam in other global regions. In addition, Nimeiry's association with the Abu Qurun Sufi order also played a role in his turn towards Islam, leading him to assign followers of this order to significant positions.

== The law and its implications ==
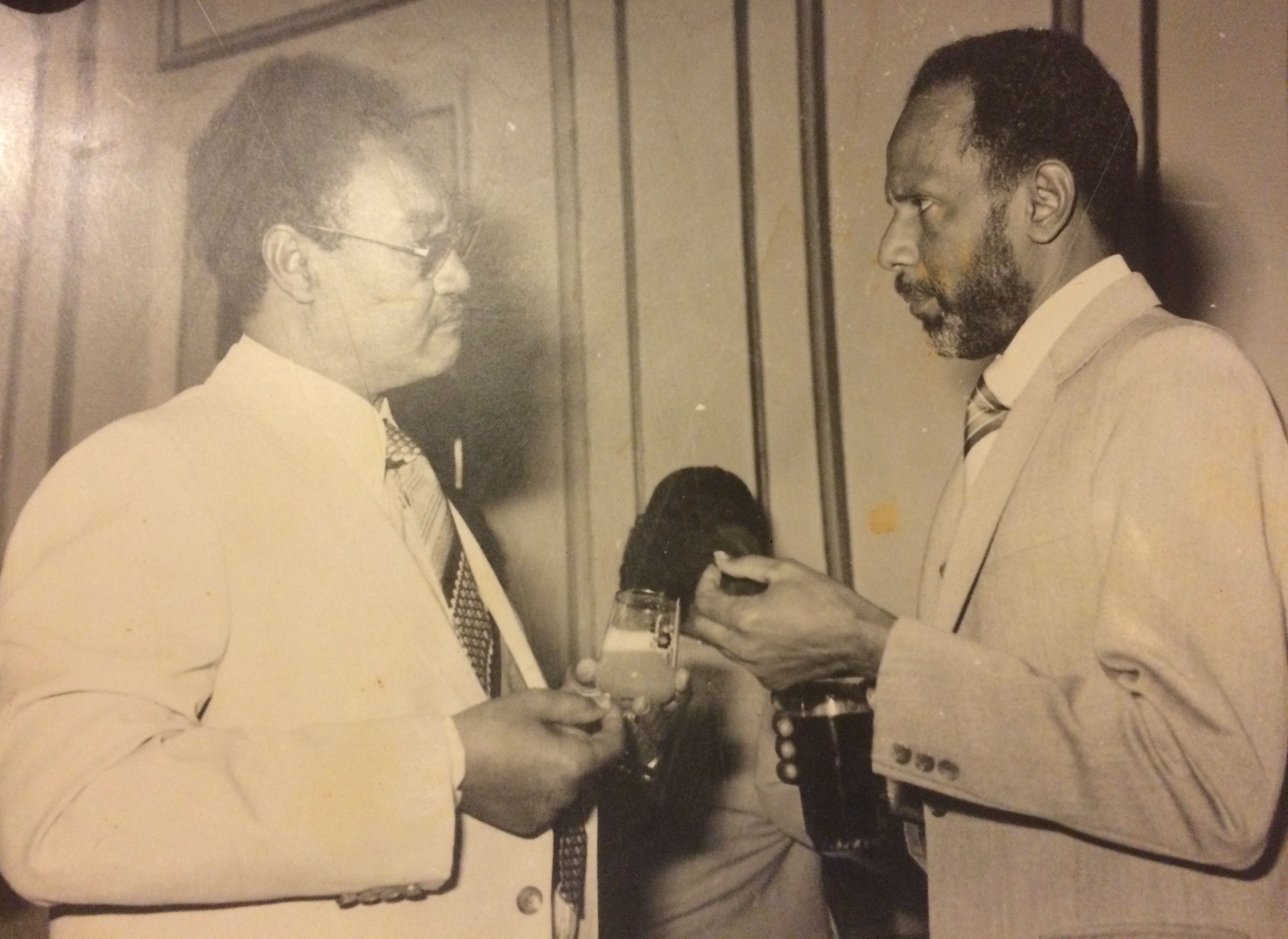
Gaafar Nimeiry (left) switched from communism to sharia laws with Hasan Al-Turabi's (right) aid, after the 1977 National Reconciliation.

The commencement of the legislation for the "Islamic approach" (path or revolution) in early 1983 resulted in the introduction of several directives and laws to enforce sharia law and other fundamental Islamic doctrines. By September 1983, Nimeiry introduced sharia law in Sudan, later known as the "September Laws". A group of Islamists, including al-Nile Abu Qarun, Awad al-Jaid, and Badriya Suleiman, who were students of al-Turabi, assisted Nimeiry in drafting the laws. The laws led to prohibition and implementing hudud punishments, like public amputations for theft and floggings for drinking alcohol. Economic reforms to confirm with Islam were introduced in early 1984, removing interest and implementing zakat. Nimeiry proclaimed himself the "imam of the Sudanese umma" in 1984.

Hassan al-Turabi backed the September Laws, in contrast to Sadiq al-Mahdi's opposing stance. al-Turabi, along with supporters within the government, also objected to autonomy in the southern region, a non-religious constitution, and the adoption of non-Islamic cultural practices. Opposition to Nimeiry's Islamisation came from various quarters. Southerners, northern seculars and religious voices, and the judiciary voiced concerns about the undemocratic implementation and lack of consultation. Sadiq al-Mahdi, leader of the Umma Party, was initially jailed for his opposition. In addition, the state-wide declaration of sharia law alienated the predominantly Christian and animist south, which exacerbated the conflict in the south to a civil war in 1983. Thereafter, in 1984, Nimeiry declared a state of emergency, giving special powers to the military.

To show his dedication to sharia, Nimeiry banned "European dancing" and ordered all alcoholic beverages in Khartoum spectacularly dumped into the Blue Nile. In total, US$11 million worth of alcohol was dumped. Until this prohibition, the trade in such goods as well as ownership of nightclubs and bars had traditionally been dominated by Sudanese Greek merchants, who controlled around 80% of the market. Since then, the purveying, consumption, and purchasing of alcohol have been banned in Sudan, with the penalty for violating the prohibition being 40 lashes.

Nimeiry was allied with the Muslim Brotherhood led by al-Turabi and allowed the group to work freely which they used to empower themselves and take control. They publicly supported the introduction of laws in September 1983 through large marches and offered significant political support using their networks and influential members such as judges Muhammad Mahjoub Haj Nour and Al-Makashfi Taha Al-Kabashi. In 1984, Nimeiry articulated his vision of establishing an Islamic state in Sudan at an Islamic conference. He initiated proposals to extensively amend Sudan's 1973 constitution to declare the country an "Islamic republic". These amendments aimed to designate the president as "a leader of the believers and the head and imam of the state" and assert sharia as the primary source of law, excluding non-Muslims from certain aspects of public life. Nimeiry's affiliation with the Abu Qurun Sufi order influenced his belief in being the sole authority to interpret laws based on sharia principles.

Nimeiry defended the adoption of sharia law by citing an increase in crime rates. He asserted that the implementation of the sharia led to a significant decline in crime, reporting a reduction of more than 40% within a year, attributing it to the imposition of new penalties. However, the historian Gabriel Warburg asserted that examining the validity of Nimeiry's assertion regarding the decrease in crime rates in Sudan in 1985 is challenging as there appears to be a lack of independent statistical evidence that can either disprove or support this claim. Nimeiry credited Sudan's economic prosperity to the zakat and taxation law, emphasising its advantages for both the impoverished and non-Muslims. Nevertheless, his economic strategies, which encompassed Islamic banking, resulted in severe financial problems that worsened Sudan's economic condition, with inflation escalating to 41% and an external debt of US$9 billion.

=== Amputation ===
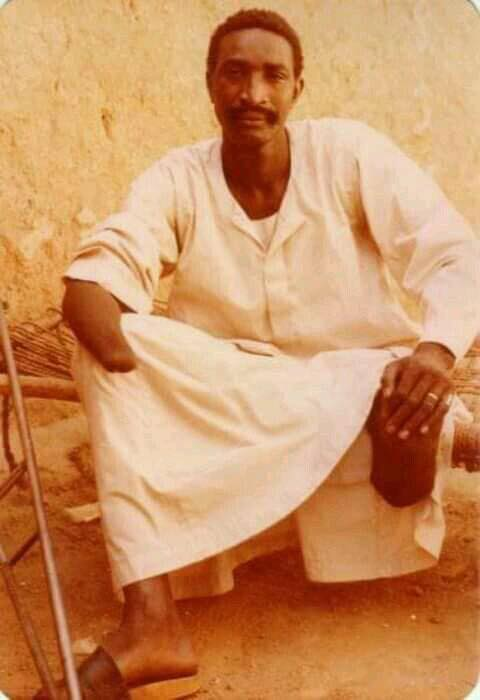
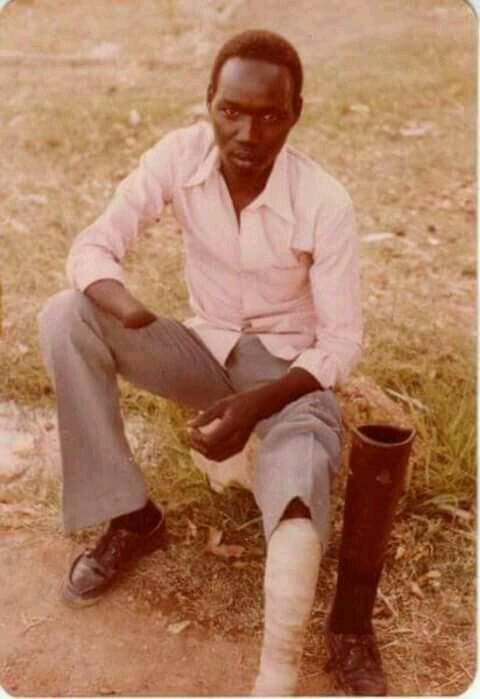
Cross amputation survivors, Adam Ismaeel (left) and Ibrahim Osman (right), in 1986

The period from 1983 to 1985 brought severe drought and desertification in Sudan, which had a significant impact on agricultural productivity and food availability in the region. This led to a famine declared on 29 November 1984 by the United States Agency for International Development. However, the implementation of the September Laws and hudud punishment was not hindered by the famine.

Three hundred Sudanese individuals underwent limb amputations as a penalty for stealing property valued at more than US$40. These amputees faced continuous social stigma, struggled to secure employment due to the perception of their severed limbs as symbols of criminality, and often were subject to wrongful arrests. The amputation procedures, performed publicly by untrained individuals, exacerbated amputees' suffering.

To cope with the physical and emotional pain, some amputees resorted to crime or addiction. However, they rallied together to form a self-help association, aiming to establish small businesses and obtain medical and legal assistance. They sought recognition as a charity but faced opposition from the government, citing concerns that it might be used as a front for criminals and disrupt the Sudan's form of Islamic justice.

Sudanese historian al-Mahbob Abdul Salam recounts that Hassan al-Turabi lost consciousness while witnessing an amputation at Kober prison. In 1985, Hassan al-Turabi stated, "Ultimately you cannot do away with amputations because it is there in the book [Quran]."

=== Execution of Mahmoud Muhammad Taha ===
Taha was executed in 1985 for apostasy and sedition under the September Law

The Republican Brotherhood, established by Mahmoud Mohammed Taha, represented another Islamic movement in Sudan. This movement endorsed the idea of Islam having two messages and discarded various Islamic traditions. It advocated for peaceful relations with Israel, gender equality, and various freedoms. It also criticised Wahhabism, opposed the enforcement of Islamic penal codes, and supported a federal social democratic governance system. Taha vehemently opposed the prohibition of the Sudanese Communist Party, denouncing it as an undermining of democracy, despite not being affiliated with communism. He was convicted of apostasy in 1968 by Ismail al-Azhari's government and faced a similar sentence again in 1984.

Taha was executed on 18 January 1985 under the September Laws. He was sentenced to death for the crime of apostasy and sedition. Taha's execution sparked international outrage and condemnation, with many human rights organisations and individuals decrying the violation of his right to freedom of thought and expression.

=== Southern Sudan ===
To counter the south’s growing political power, on 5 June 1983, Nimeiry re-divided the Southern Region into the three provinces of Bahr al Ghazal, Al Istiwai, and Aali an Nil. He had already suspended the Southern Regional Assembly nearly two years earlier. The southern-based Sudanese People's Liberation Movement (SPLM) and its military wing, the Sudanese People's Liberation Army, which emerged in mid-1983, unsuccessfully opposed this re-division and called for the creation of a new united Sudan.

Nimeiry's Islamic phase marked the end of the Addis Ababa Agreement of 1972, sparking renewed tensions in Southern Sudan in 1983. The initial agreement had provided regional autonomy and acknowledged Sudan's diverse societal makeup. It guaranteed equality irrespective of race or faith, permitting different personal laws for non-Muslims. However, conflicts heightened due to the discovery of oil, the dissolution of the Southern Regional Assembly, and attempts at decentralisation.

In the south, the September Laws were bitterly resented both by secularised Muslims and by the predominantly non-Muslim southerners, as Christians faced sharia punishment, including 8, who were hanged. The SPLM denounced the sharia, and the executions and amputations ordered by religious courts. Meanwhile, the security situation in the south had deteriorated so much that by the end of 1983 it amounted to a resumption of the civil war.

== Aftermath ==
Nimeiry's partnership with the Muslim Brotherhood and the Ansar was intended to unify religious factions and introduce sharia law. However, despite initially working together, the Ansar criticised Nimeiry's application of these laws as being both un-Islamic and corrupt. After Nimeiry's removal after the 1985 coup d'état, Sudan's political landscape transformed, giving rise to multiple political parties. The National Islamic Front (NIF), Ansar, and Khatmiyya Sufi order (DUP) became significant players in Sudanese politics. Hassan al-Turabi and the NIF consistently advocated for Islamic laws and opposed alterations to the existing framework.

The laws were frozen during Sudan’s transition to democracy after the 1985 coup d'état, but were reinstated during the Omar al-Bashir era between 1989 and 2019, after the 1989 coup d'état.

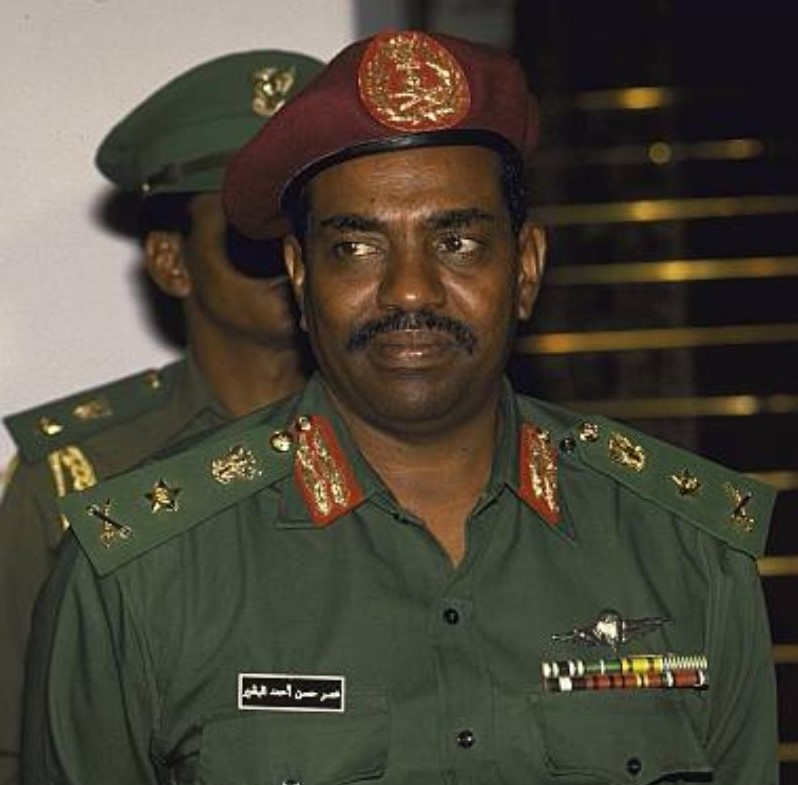
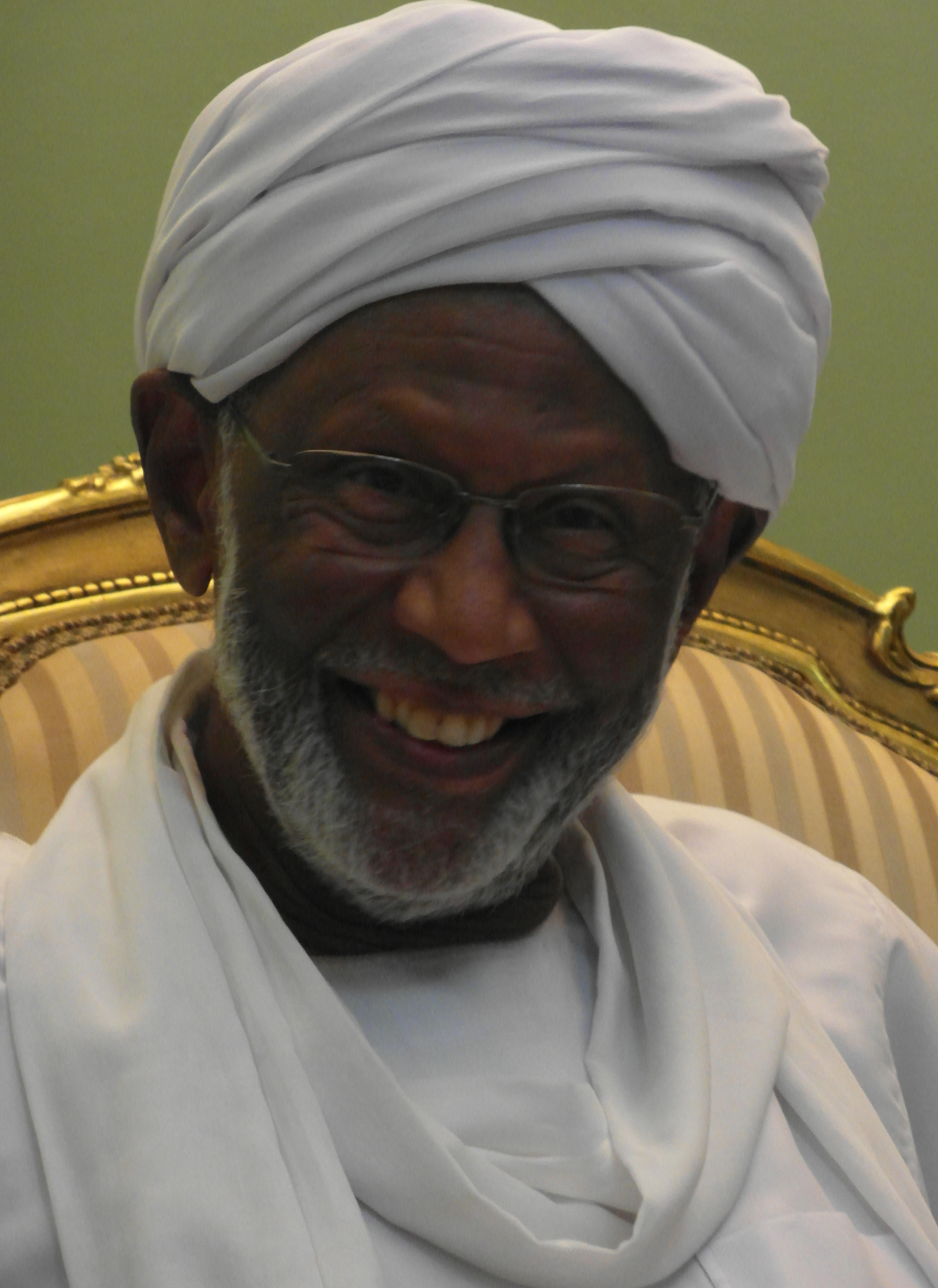
Omar al-Bashir came after the 1989 coup d'état that was orchestrated by al-Turabi. They re-introduced sharia laws through the 1991 Sudanese Criminal Act

Sharia remained a source of legislation in the 15 states of the North. The 1991 Sudanese Criminal Act, in accordance with sharia, authorised hudud punishments in the north. The consumption of alcohol was punishable by 40 lashes for a Muslim and 20 lashes for a Christian. Islamic family jurisprudence applied to Muslims in Sudan, while certain Islamic law provisions discriminated against women, especially regarding inheritance, marriage and divorce. Women were instructed to dress modestly according to Islamic standards, including wearing a head covering which was enforced by the Public Order Police. In addition, converting from Islam to another religion was considered apostasy under sharia and was punishable by death in the North.

For example, in 2009 a group of women, excluding journalist Lubna al-Hussein, were lashed for wearing jeans. As reported in 2012, since 2005, numerous individuals have been convicted of adultery, facing penalties such as flogging and, in some instances, stoning. In July 2013, a 23-year-old mother of a six-month-old baby was sentenced to death by stoning for adultery. In 2022, a woman was due to be stoned for adultery before being jailed for 6 months.

In 2013, According to Deputy Chief Justice Abdul Rahman Sharfi, since 2001, 16 people were amputated or cross-amputated. In 1991, 2013, 2015, 2021, and 2023, there were documented cases of men being sentenced to hand amputation for theft. In 2013, three men were sentenced to amputation for stealing cooking oil in North Darfur under article 173 of the 1991 Sudanese Criminal code, but the sentence was later overturned. On 14 February 2013, a man's right hand and foot were amputated at al-Ribat Hospital after he was convicted with armed robbery, known as "Hirabah" in article 167 of the 1991 Sudanese Criminal Act. A similar cross-amputation sentence was issued and enforced in 2021.

Until the 2005 Comprehensive Peace Agreement, the Sudanese government condoned certain discriminatory practices against Christians living in the North. For instance, it mandated that all students in the North study Islam in school, regardless of their religious beliefs.

On 17 March 2000, Curtis Francis Doebbler, a lawyer and human rights advocate, filed a case against Sudan, known as Curtis Francis Doebbler v. Sudan, before the African Union Commission. Doebbler alleged that Sudan violated various provisions of the African Charter on Human and Peoples' Rights by arbitrarily arresting, detaining, and torturing individuals, including himself, during his work as legal counsel. On 29 May 2003, the African Union Commission found that Sudan violated Article 5 of the African Charter. The Government of Sudan was urged to revise its 1991 Criminal Law to meet international human rights standards, abolish flogging as a punishment, and ensure victims receive compensation.
