= History of Sudan =

Map of Sudan from 2011 with South Sudan independent

The history of Sudan refers to the territory that today makes up Republic of the Sudan and the state of South Sudan, which became independent in 2011. The territory of Sudan is geographically part of a larger African region, also known as "Sudan". The term is derived from Arabic: بلاد السودان bilād as-sūdān, or "land of the black people", and has sometimes been used more widely referring to the Sahel belt of West and Central Africa.

The modern Republic of the Sudan was formed in early 1956 and inherited its boundaries from Anglo-Egyptian Sudan, established in 1899. For times predating 1899, usage of the term "Sudan" mainly applied to the Turkish Sudan and the Mahdist State, and a wider and changing territory between Egypt in the North and regions in the South adjacent to modern Uganda, Kenya and Ethiopia.

The early history of the Kingdom of Kush, located along the Nile region in northern Sudan, is intertwined with the history of ancient Egypt, with which it was politically allied over several regnal eras. By virtue of its proximity to Egypt, Sudan participated in the wider history of the Near East, with the important 25th dynasty of Egypt and the Christianization of the three Nubian kingdoms Nobatia, Makuria, and Alodia in the sixth century. As a result of Christianization, the Old Nubian language stands as the oldest recorded Nilo-Saharan language (earliest records dating to the eighth century in an adaptation of the Coptic alphabet).

While Islam was already present on the Sudanese Red Sea coast and the adjacent territories since the 7th century, the Nile Valley did not undergo Islamization until the 14th-15th century, following the decline of the Christian kingdoms. These kingdoms were succeeded by the Sultanate of Sennar in the early 16th century, which controlled large parts of the Nile Valley and the Eastern Desert, while the kingdoms of Darfur controlled the western part of Sudan. Two small kingdoms arose in the southern regions, the Shilluk Kingdom of 1490, and Taqali of 1750, near modern-day South Sudan, but both northern and southern regions were seized by Muhammad Ali of Egypt during the 1820s. The oppressive rule of Muhammad Ali and his immediate successors is credited for stirring up resentment against the Turco-Egyptian and British rulers and led to the establishment of the Mahdist State, founded by Muhammad Ahmad in 1881.

Since independence in 1956, the history of Sudan has been tarnished by internal conflict, including the First Sudanese Civil War (1955–1972), the Second Sudanese Civil War (1983–2005) –culminating in the secession of South Sudan on 9 July 2011– the War in Darfur (2003–2020) and the current Sudanese civil war (2023–present).

== Prehistory ==
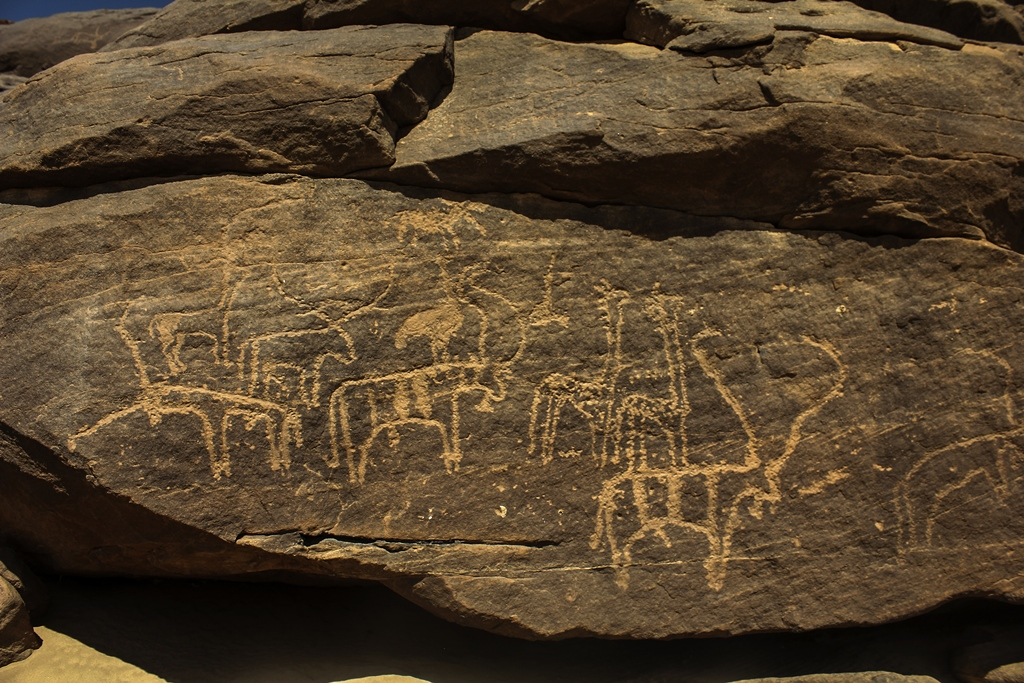
Sabu-Jaddi Rock Art site: Cattle

=== Nile Valley ===
Affad 23 is an archaeological site located in the Affad region of southern Dongola Reach in northern Sudan, which hosts "the well-preserved remains of prehistoric camps (relics of the oldest open-air hut in the world) and diverse hunting and gathering loci some 50,000 years old".

Evidence from cattle bones found at Letti Desert 2 in Sudan suggests that cattle may have been domesticated independently in Africa at the same time as in the Middle East – around 10,000 years ago. By the eighth millennium BC, people of a Neolithic culture had settled into a sedentary way of life there in fortified mud-brick villages, where they supplemented hunting and fishing on the Nile with grain gathering and cattle herding. Genetic data suggests the Kordofan melon is the closest relative to the modern watermelon which may indicate it was first domesticated in Sudan. During the fifth millennium BC, migrations from the drying Sahara brought neolithic people into the Nile Valley along with agriculture. The population that resulted from this cultural and genetic mixing developed a social hierarchy over the next centuries and became the Kingdom of Kush (with the capital at Kerma) around 1070 BC. Anthropological and archaeological research indicates that during the pre-dynastic period Lower Nubia and Magadan Upper Egypt were ethnically, and culturally nearly identical, and thus, simultaneously evolved systems of Pharaonic kingship by 3300 BC. Together with other countries on Red Sea, Sudan is considered the most likely location of the land known to the ancient Egyptians as Punt (or "Ta Netjeru", meaning "God's Plan"), whose first mention dates to the 10th century BC.

=== Eastern Sudan ===
In eastern Sudan, the Butana Group appears around 4000 BC. These people produced simple decorated pottery, lived in round huts and were most likely herdsmen, hunters, but also consumed land snails and there is evidence for some agriculture. The earliest archaeological evidence for the origins of domesticated sorghum come from the Butana Group in the 4th millennium BC. The Gash Group started around 3000 BC and is another prehistory culture known from several places. These people produced decorated pottery and lived from farming and cattle breeding. Mahal Teglinos was an important place about 10 hectare large. In the center were excavated mud brick built houses. Seals and seal impressions attest a higher level of administration. Burials in an elite cemetery were marked with rough tomb stones. In the second millennium followed the Jebel Mokram Group. They produced pottery with simple incised decoration and lived in simple round huts. Cattle breeding was most likely the economical base.

== Kerma culture ==
Kerma was a Bronze Age culture (c. 2500–1500 bce) located in what is today Sudan and southern Egypt. It is one of the earliest complex societies in Africa and the earliest in Sub saharan Africa and, at its height, rivaled Ancient Egypt. The ancient Kerma culture spans the Pre-Kerma, examining the settlements and cemeteries of this ancient culture during the Pre-Kerma (3500–2500 bce, included here as a precursor to the Kerma civilization), Early Kerma, Middle Kerma, Classic Kerma, and Recent Kerma periods. Much of what is known comes from the capital city and type site, Kerma.

The Kerma culture was an early civilization that centered in kerma and later Dukki gel. The Kerma culture was centered in upper Nubia and prospered from between 2500 BCE and 1504 BCE. Kerma displayed a unique culture completely distinct from ancient Egypt (unlike the later kingdom of Kush and Meroe which were more Egyptianized as result of the Egyptian new kingdom). Kermans developed their own unique blue-glazed quartzitic faience and produced fine, thin-walled black-topped pottery adorned with distinct geometric patterns and had distinct religion based on animism. Kerma later extended its reach as far north as Egypt. The Kerma civilization was an ethnic melting pot, with origins tied to a complex web of cultures native to both the Sahara, and farther south parts of Central Africa. Kerman history is divided into 4 phases: a Pre-Kerma phase (c. 3500–2500 BC), Early Kerma (c. 2500–2050 BC), Middle Kerma or the Moyen period (c. 2050–1750 BC), and Classical Kerma (c. 1750–1500 BC).

=== Pre-Kerma phase (c. 3500–2500 BC) and early Kerman phase (c. 2500–2050 BC) ===
25 May 2026}}The Kerma culture was rooted in the pre-Kerma culture, which flourished from around 3500 BC in Upper Nubia. Evidence suggests that the pre-Kerma culture bore statelets and small kingdoms, fewer in number than the A-Group culture in Lower Nubia, but likely larger polities. Upper Nubia had contact with the Egyptian Old Kingdom (c. 2700–2200 BC) during its control of Lower Nubia, as suggested by epigraphic evidence as well as evidence from Aniba, which also indicate the presence of early Nubian regional rulers.

=== Middle (Moyen) phase (2050–1750 BCE) and Classical Kerma phase (1750-1504 BCE) ===
During the Middle or Moyen phase the Kingdom of Kerma became a highly centralized power. While initially loyal to the kings of Egypt, they often challenged Egypt's border and even invaded Egypt. Forcing the Egyptian state to build a chain of fortresses to protect their southern border during the Middle Kingdom. The Middle (Moyen) Kerma phase aligns with the Middle Kingdom of Egypt and is defined by the rapid growth of the city of Kerma into a powerful, urbanized center with a highly stratified society. During the Classical Kerma phase, Kerma developed advanced fortresses in Doukki gel and the Kerma Kingdom came into conflict with Middle Kingdom Egypt around 1650 BC, Kerma expanded north of Egyptian fortresses in the 2nd cataract. Military support was sought by the hykosos in an attempt to fully conquer Egypt, the war was ended when the Egyptian New Kingdom arose and were able to defeat the hyksos and ultimately Kush (Kerma) and bring Kush under its control by about 1500 BC.

Around 1500 BC, it was absorbed into the New Kingdom of Egypt by Thutmose 1 and the more Egyptianized Kingdom of Kush gained independence from Egypt around 1070 BCE

Middle Kerma used tumuli to bury high ranking Nobles.

=== Kerman Spirituality and Religion ===
The spiritual and religious traditions of the Kerma culture was markedly distinct from later Napatan and Meroitic traditions who were influenced by the Egyptian Amun cult. The Kerma culture displayed animistic elements such as possibly venerating the lion that become precursors of the later Apademak in the Napatan and meroitic periods jebel barkal was also an animistic site for the Kushites

== Antiquity ==
=== Kingdom of Kush ===
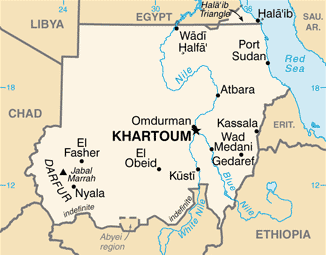
Sudan combines the lands of several ancient kingdoms.

Northern Sudan's earliest historical record comes from ancient Egyptian sources, which described the land upstream as Kush. For more than two thousand years after the Old Kingdom (c. 2700–2180 BC), Egypt had a dominating and significant influence over its southern neighbor, and even afterward, the legacy of Egyptian cultural and religious introductions remained important.

Over the centuries, trade developed. Egyptian caravans carried grain to Kush and returned to Aswan with ivory, incense, hides, and carnelian (a stone prized both as jewelry and for arrowheads) for shipment downriver. Egyptian governors particularly valued gold in Nubia and soldiers in the pharaoh's army. Egyptian military expeditions penetrated Kush periodically during the Old Kingdom. Yet there was no attempt to establish a permanent presence in the area until the Middle Kingdom (c. 2100–1720 BC), when Egypt constructed a network of forts along the Nile as far south as Samnah in Lower Egypt to guard the flow of gold from mines in Wawat, the area between the First and Second Cataracts.

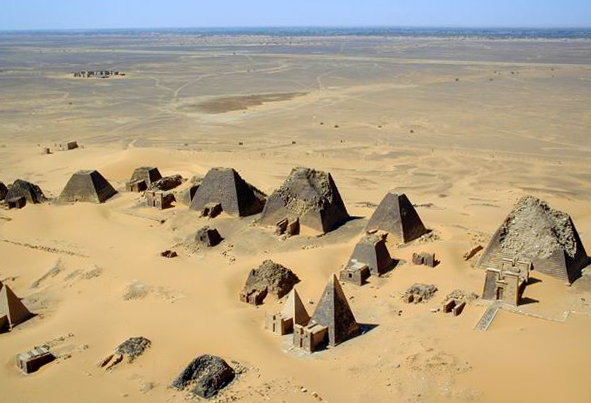
Aerial view of the Nubian pyramids at Meroë (2001), capital of the Kingdom of Kush

Around 1720 BC, Canaanite nomads called the Hyksos took over Egypt, ended the Middle Kingdom, severed links with Kush, and destroyed the forts along the Nile River. To fill the vacuum left by the Egyptian withdrawal, a culturally distinct indigenous Kushite kingdom emerged at Kerma, near present-day Dongola. After Egyptian power revived during the New Kingdom (c. 1570–1100 BC), the pharaoh Ahmose I incorporated Kush as an Egyptian ruled province governed by a viceroy. Although Egypt's administrative control of Kush extended only down to the Fourth Cataract, Egyptian sources list tributary districts reaching to the Red Sea and upstream to the confluence of the Blue Nile and White Nile rivers. Egyptian authorities ensured the loyalty of local chiefs by drafting their children to serve as pages at the pharaoh's court. Egypt also expected tribute in gold and workers from local Kushite chiefs.

Once Egypt had established political and military mastery over Kush, officials, priests, merchants, and artisans settled in the region. The Egyptian language became widely used in everyday activities. Many rich Kushites took to worshipping Egyptian gods and built temples for them. The temples remained centres of official religious worship until the coming of Christianity to the region during the sixth century. When Egyptian influence declined or succumbed to foreign domination, the Kushite elite regarded themselves as central powers and believed themselves as idols of Egyptian culture and religion.

By the 11th century BC, the authority of the New Kingdom dynasties had diminished, allowing divided rule in Egypt, and ending Egyptian control of Kush. With the withdrawal of the Egyptians, there ceased to be any written record or information from Kush about the region's activities over the next three hundred years. In the early eighth century BC, however, Kush emerged as an independent kingdom ruled from Napata by an aggressive line of monarchs who slowly extended their influence into Egypt. Around 750 BC, a Kushite king called Kashta conquered Upper Egypt and became ruler of Thebes until approximately 740 BC. His successor, Piye, subdued the Nile Delta and conquered Egypt, thus initiating the Twenty-fifth Dynasty. Piye founded a line of kings who ruled Kush and Thebes for about a hundred years. The dynasty's interference with Assyria's sphere of influence in the Near East caused a confrontation between Egypt and the powerful Assyrian state, which controlled a vast empire comprising much of the Middle East, Anatolia, Caucasus and the Eastern Mediterranean Basin from their homeland in Upper Mesopotamia.

Taharqa (688–663 BC), the last Kushite pharaoh, was defeated and driven out of the Near East by Sennacherib of Assyria. Sennacherib's successor Esarhaddon went further, launching a full-scale invasion of Egypt in 674 BC, defeating Taharqa and quickly conquering the land. Taharqa fled back to Nubia, and native Egyptian princes were installed by the Assyrians as vassals of Esarhaddon. However, Taharqa was able to return some years later and wrest back control of a part of Egypt as far as Thebes from the Egyptian vassal princes of Assyria. Esarhaddon died in his capital Nineveh while preparing to return to Egypt and once more eject the Kushites.

Esarhaddon's successor Ashurbanipal sent a general with a small army which again defeated and ejected Taharqa from Egypt. Taharqa died in Nubia two years later. His successor, Tantamani, attempted to regain Egypt. He successfully defeated Necho I, the puppet ruler installed by Ashurbanipal, taking Thebes in the process. The Assyrians then sent a powerful army southwards. Tantamani was heavily routed, and the Assyrian army sacked Thebes to such an extent it never truly recovered. A native ruler, Psamtik I was placed on the throne, as a vassal of Ashurbanipal, thus ending the Kushite/Nubian Empire.

=== Meroë ===
Egypt's succeeding dynasty failed to reassert full control over Kush. Around 590 BC, however, an Egyptian army sacked Napata, compelling the Kushite court to move to a more secure location further south at Meroë near the Sixth Cataract. For several centuries thereafter, the Meroitic kingdom developed independently of Egyptian influence and domination, which passed successively under Iranian, Greek, and, finally, Roman domination. During the height of its power in the second and third centuries BC, Meroë extended over a region from the Third Cataract in the north to Soba, near present-day Khartoum, in the south. An Egyptian-influenced pharaonic tradition persisted among a line of rulers at Meroë, who raised stelae to record the achievements of their reigns and erected Nubian pyramids to contain their tombs. These objects and the ruins of palaces, temples, and baths at Meroë attest to a centralized political system that employed artisans' skills and commanded the labour of a large work force. A well-managed irrigation system allowed the area to support a higher population density than was possible during later periods. By the first century BC, the use of Egyptian hieroglyphs gave way to a Meroitic alphabet adapted for the Nubian-related language spoken by the region's people.

Meroë's succession system was not necessarily hereditary; the matrilineal royal family member deemed most worthy often became king. The kandake or queen mother's role in the selection process was crucial to a smooth succession. The crown appears to have passed from brother to brother (or sister) and only when no siblings remained from father to son.

Although Napata remained Meroë's religious centre, northern Kush eventually fell into disorder as it came under pressure from the Blemmyes, nomads from east of the Nile. However, the Nile continued to give the region access to the Mediterranean world. Additionally, Meroë maintained contact with Arab and Indian traders along the Red Sea coast and incorporated Hellenistic and Indian cultural influences into its daily life. Inconclusive evidence suggests that metallurgical technology may have been transmitted westward across the savanna belt to West Africa from Meroë's iron smelteries.

In the second century AD, the Nobatia occupied the Nile's west bank in northern Kush. They are believed to have been one of several well-armed bands of horse- and camel-borne warriors who sold their skills to Meroë for protection; eventually they intermarried and established themselves among the Meroitic people as a military aristocracy.

Meanwhile, the old Meroitic kingdom contracted because of the expansion of the powerful Kingdom of Aksum to the east. By 350, King Ezana of Axum had captured and destroyed the capital of Meroë, ending the kingdom's independent existence and conquering its territory.

== Medieval Nubia (c. 350–1500) ==
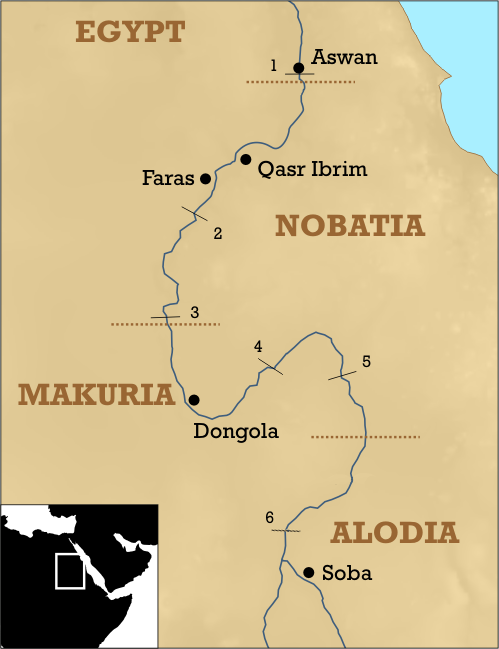
The three Christian Nubian kingdoms. The northern border of Alodia is unclear, but it also might have been located further north, between the fourth and fifth Nile cataract.

On the turn of the fifth century, the Blemmyes established a short-lived state in Upper Egypt and Lower Nubia, probably centered around Talmis (Kalabsha), but before 450 they were already driven out of the Nile Valley by the Nobatians. The latter eventually founded a kingdom on their own, Nobatia. By the 6th century there were in total three Nubian kingdoms: Nobatia in the north, which had its capital at Pachoras (Faras); the central kingdom, Makuria centred at Tungul (Old Dongola), about 13 kilometres (8 miles) south of modern Dongola; and Alodia, in the heartland of the old Kushitic kingdom, which had its capital at Soba (now a suburb of modern-day Khartoum). Still in the sixth century they converted to Christianity. In the seventh century, probably at some point between 628 and 642, Nobatia was incorporated into Makuria.

Between 639 and 641 the Muslim Arabs of the Rashidun Caliphate conquered Byzantine Egypt. In 641 or 642 and again in 652 they invaded Nubia but were repelled, making the Nubians one of the few who managed to defeat the Arabs during the Islamic expansion. Afterwards the Makurian king and the Arabs agreed on the Baqt, a unique non-aggression pact that also included an annual exchange of gifts, thus acknowledging Makuria's independence. While the Arabs failed to conquer Nubia they began to settle east of the Nile, where they eventually founded several port towns and intermarried with the local Beja.

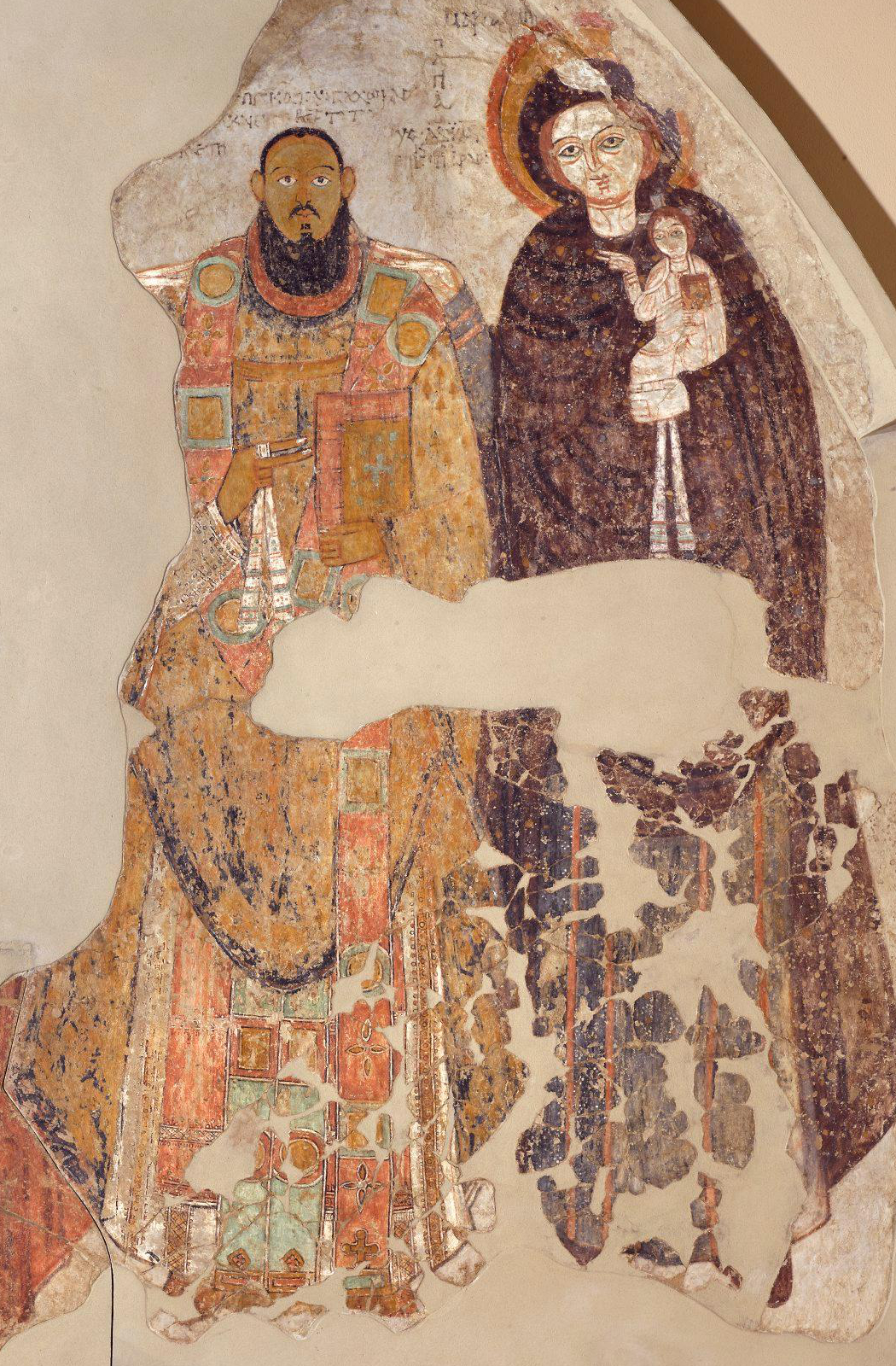
Nubian bishop and Virgin Mary on a wall painting from Faras (11th century)

From the mid 8th-mid 11th century Christian Nubia went through its Golden Age, when its political power and cultural development peaked. In 747 Makuria invaded Egypt, which at this time belonged to the declining Umayyads, and it did so again in the early 960s, when it pushed as far north as Akhmim. Makuria maintained close dynastic ties with Alodia, perhaps resulting in the temporary unification of the two kingdoms into one state. The culture of the Medieval Nubians has been described as "Afro-Byzantine", with the significance of the "African" component increasing over time. Increasing Arab influence has also been noted. The state organization was extremely centralized, being based on the Byzantine bureaucracy of the 6th and 7th centuries. Arts flourished in the form of pottery paintings and especially wall paintings. The Nubians developed an own alphabet for their language, Old Nobiin, basing it on the Coptic alphabet, while also utilizing Greek, Coptic and Arabic. Women enjoyed high social status: they had access to education, could own, buy and sell land and often used their wealth to endow churches and church paintings. Even the royal succession was matrilineal, with the son of the king's sister being the rightful heir.

Since the late 11th/12th century, Makuria's capital Dongola was in decline, and Alodia's capital declined in the 12th century as well. In the 14th (the earliest recorded migration from Egypt to the Sudanese Nile Valley dates to 1324) and 15th century Bedouin tribes overran most of Sudan, migrating to the Butana, the Gezira, Kordofan and Darfur. In 1365 a civil war forced the Makurian court to flee to Gebel Adda in Lower Nubia, while Dongola was destroyed and left to the Arabs. Afterwards Makuria continued to exist as a rump state. The last known Makurian king was Joel, who is attested for the years 1463 and 1484 and under whom Makuria probably witnessed a brief renaissance. After his death the kingdom probably collapsed. To the south, the kingdom of Alodia fell to either the Arabs, commanded by tribal leader Abdallah Jamma, or the Funj, an African people originating from the south. Datings range from the 9th century after the Hijra (c. 1396–1494), the late 15th century, 1504 to 1509. An Alodian rump state might have survived in the form of the Kingdom of Fazughli, lasting until 1685.

== Islamic kingdoms (c. 1500–1821) ==
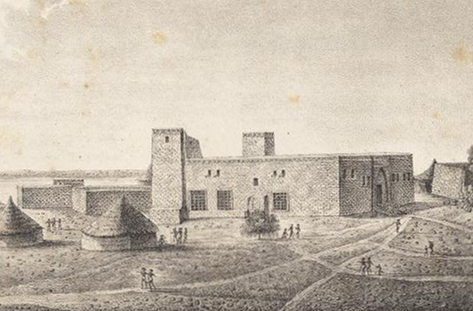
The great mosque of Sennar, built in the 17th century.

In 1504 the Funj are recorded to have founded the kingdom of Sennar, in which Abdallah Jamma's realm was incorporated. By 1523, when Jewish traveller David Reubeni visited Sudan, the Funj state already extended as far north as Dongola. Meanwhile, Islam began to be preached on the Nile by Sufi holymen who settled there in the 15th and 16th centuries and by David Reubeni's visit king Amara Dunqas, previously a Pagan or nominal Christian, was recorded to be Muslim. However, the Funj would retain un-Islamic customs like the divine kingship and the consummation of alcohol until the 18th century. Sudanese folk Islam preserved many rituals stemming from Christian traditions until the recent past.

Soon the Funj came in conflict with the Ottomans, who had occupied Suakin around 1526 and eventually pushed south along the Nile, reaching the third Nile cataract area in 1583/1584. A subsequent Ottoman attempt to capture Dongola was repelled by the Funj in 1585. Afterwards, Hannik, located just south of the third cataract, would mark the border between the two states. The aftermath of the Ottoman invasion saw the attempted usurpation of Ajib, a minor king of northern Nubia. While the Funj eventually killed him in 1611/1612, his successors, the Abdallab, were granted the authority to govern everything north of the confluence of Blue and White Niles with considerable autonomy.

During the 17th century the Funj state reached its widest extend, but in the following century it began to decline. A coup in 1718 brought a dynastic change, while another one in 1761/1762 resulted in the Hamaj regency, where the Hamaj (a people from the Ethiopian borderlands) effectively ruled while the Funj sultans were their puppets. Shortly afterwards the sultanate began to fragment; by the early 19th century it was essentially restricted to the Gezira.

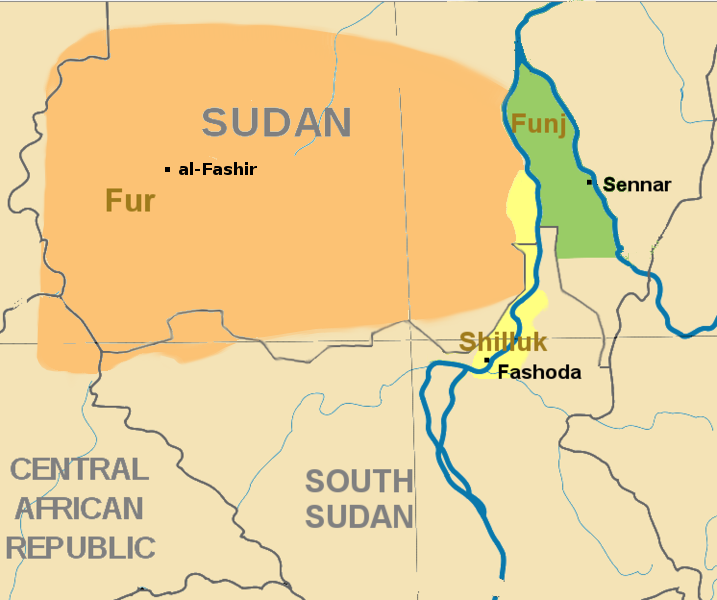
Southern Sudan in c. 1800

The coup of 1718 kicked off a policy of pursuing a more orthodox Islam, which in turn promoted the Arabization of the state. In order to legitimize their rule over their Arab subjects the Funj began to propagate an Umayyad descend. North of the confluence of the Blue and White Niles, as far downstream as Al Dabbah, the Nubians would adopt the tribal identity of the Arab Jaalin. Until the 19th century Arabic had succeeded in becoming the dominant language of central riverine Sudan and most of Kordofan.

West of the Nile, in Darfur, the Islamic period saw at first the rise of the Tunjur kingdom, which replaced the old Daju kingdom in the 15th century and extended as far west as Wadai. The Tunjur people were probably Arabized Berbers and, their ruling elite at least, Muslims. In the 17th century the Tunjur were driven from power by the Fur Keira sultanate. The Keira state, nominally Muslim since the reign of Sulayman Solong (r. c. 1660–1680), was initially a small kingdom in northern Jebel Marra, but expanded west- and northwards in the early 18th century and eastwards under the rule of Muhammad Tayrab (r. 1751–1786), peaking in the conquest of Kordofan in 1785. The apogee of this empire, now roughly the size of present-day Nigeria, would last until 1821.

== 19th century and the first half of the 20th century ==
=== Egyptian conquest ===
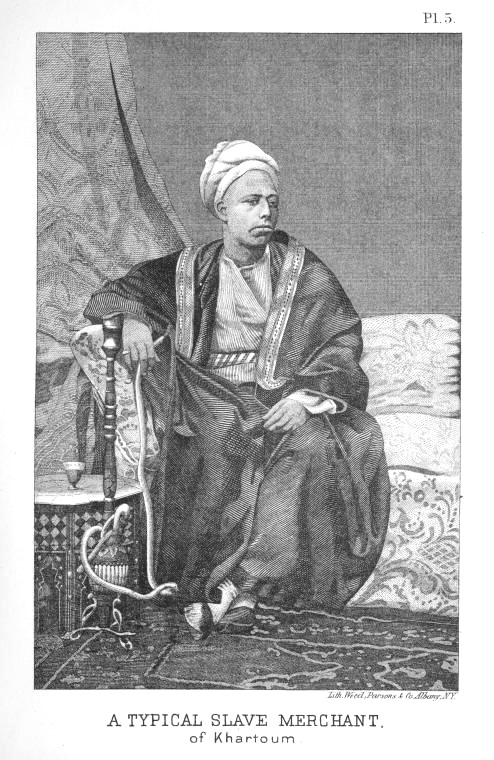
A typical slave merchant of Khartoum, 1875

From 1805, Ottoman Egypt underwent a period of rapid modernisation under Muhammad Ali Pasha, who declared himself Khedive in defiance of his nominal suzerain, the Ottoman Sultan. Within a matter of decades, Muhammad Ali transformed Egypt from a neglected Ottoman province to being virtually independent. Replicating the approach of his Mamluk predecessors in the medieval Sultanate of Egypt, Muhammad Ali sought to expand Egypt's frontiers southwards into Sudan, both as a means of guaranteeing Egypt's security, and to gain access to Sudan's natural resources. Between 1820 and 1821, Egyptian forces under the command of Muhammad Ali's son conquered and unified the northern portion of the Sudan. Owing to Egypt's continuing de jure fealty to the Ottoman Sultan, the Egyptian administration was known as the Turkiyah. Historically, the pestilential swamps of the Sudd discouraged expansion into the deeper south of the country. Although Egypt claimed all of present-day Sudan during most of the 19th century, and established a province Equatoria in southern Sudan to further this aim, it was unable to establish effective control over all of the area. In the later years of the Turkiyah, British missionaries travelled from modern-day Kenya into the Sudan to convert the local tribes to Christianity.

=== Mahdism and condominium ===
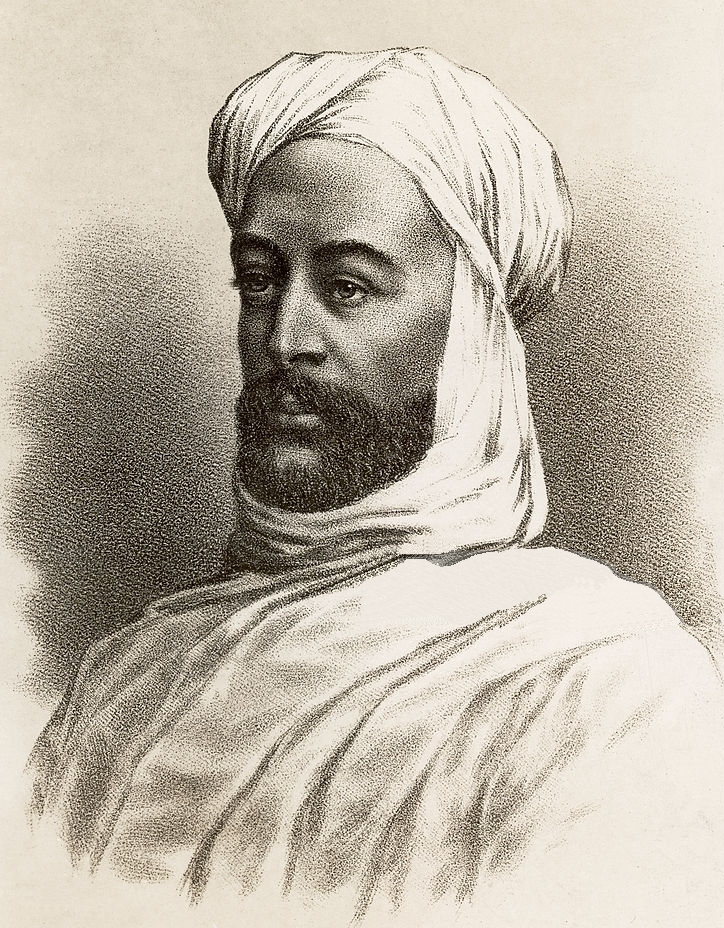
Artistic representation of Muhammad Ahmad al-Mahdi

In 1881, a religious leader named Muhammad Ahmad proclaimed himself the Mahdi ("guided one") and began a war to unify the tribes in western and central Sudan. His followers took the name "Ansar" ("followers") which they continue to use today, in association with the single largest political grouping, the Umma Party (once led by a descendant of the Mahdi, Sadiq al Mahdi). Taking advantage of conditions resulting from Ottoman-Egyptian exploitation and maladministration, the Mahdi led a nationalist revolt culminating in the fall of Khartoum on 26 January 1885. The interim governor-general of the Sudan, the British Major-General Charles George Gordon, and many of the fifty thousand inhabitants of Khartoum were massacred.

The Mahdi died in June 1885. He was followed by Abdallahi ibn Muhammad, known as the Khalifa, who began an expansion of Sudan's area into Ethiopia. Following his victories in eastern Ethiopia, he sent an army to invade Egypt, where it was defeated by the British at Toshky. The British become aware of the weakness of the Sudan.

An Anglo-Egyptian force under Lord Kitchener in 1898 was sent to Sudan. Sudan was proclaimed a condominium in 1899 under British-Egyptian administration. The Governor-General of the Sudan, for example, was appointed by "Khedival Decree", rather than simply by the British Crown, but while maintaining the appearance of joint administration, the British Empire formulated policies, and supplied most of the top administrators.

=== British control ===
Flag of the Anglo-Egyptian Sudan (1899–1956)

Emblem of Anglo-Egyptian Sudan

In 1896, a Belgian expedition claimed portions of southern Sudan that became known as the Lado Enclave. The Lado Enclave was officially part of the Belgian Congo. An 1896 agreement between the United Kingdom and Belgium saw the enclave turned over to the British after the death of King Leopold II in December 1909.

At the same time the French claimed several areas: Bahr el Ghazal, and the Western Upper Nile up to Fashoda. By 1896 they had a firm administrative hold on these areas and they planned on annexing them to French West Africa. An international conflict known as the Fashoda incident developed between France and the United Kingdom over these areas. In 1899, France agreed to cede the area to Anglo-Egyptian Sudan.

From 1898, the United Kingdom and the Khedivate of Egypt administered all of present-day Sudan as Anglo-Egyptian Sudan, but northern and southern Sudan were administered as separate provinces of the condominium. In the very early 1920s, the British passed the Closed Districts Ordinances which stipulated that passports were required for travel between the two zones, and permits were required to conduct business from one zone into the other, and totally separate administrations prevailed.

In 1916, after the British government suspected that the sultan was falling under the influence of the Ottoman government, an expedition was launched from Egypt to capture and annex Darfur into the Anglo-Egyptian Sudan. The colonial government directed financial and administrative resources to the tribes of central Sudan near Khartoum - while the outlying regions such as Darfur remained mostly forgotten and ignored. K. D. D. Henderson was the last British governor of Darfur.

In the south, English, Dinka, Bari, Nuer, Latuko, Shilluk, Azande and Pari (Lafon) were official languages, while in the north, Arabic and English were used as official languages. Islam was discouraged by the British in the south, where Christian missionaries were permitted to work. Condominium governors of south Sudan attended colonial conferences in East Africa, not in Khartoum, and the British hoped to add south Sudan to their East African colonies.

Most of the British focus was on developing the economy and infrastructure of the north. Southern political arrangements were left largely as they had been prior to the arrival of the British. Until the 1920s, the British had limited authority in the south.

In order to establish their authority in the north, the British promoted the power of Sayyid Ali al-Mirghani, head of the Khatmiyya sect and Sayyid Abd al-Rahman al-Mahdi, head of the Ansar sect. The Ansar sect essentially became the Umma party, and Khatmiyya became the Democratic Unionist Party.

In 1943, the British began preparing the north for self-government, establishing a North Sudan Advisory Council to advise on the governance of the six north Sudanese provinces: Khartoum, Kordofan, Darfur, and the Eastern, Northern, and Blue Nile provinces. Then, in 1946, the British administration reversed its policy and decided to integrate north and south Sudan under one government. The south Sudanese authorities were informed at the Juba Conference of 1947 that they would in future be governed by a common administrative authority with the north. From 1948, 13 delegates, nominated by the British authorities, represented the south on the Sudan Legislative Assembly.

Many southerners felt betrayed by the British, because they were largely excluded from the new government. The language of the new government was Arabic, but the bureaucrats and politicians from southern Sudan had, for the most part, been trained in English. Of the eight hundred new governmental positions vacated by the British in 1953, only four were given to southerners.

Also, the political structure in the south was not as organized in the north, so political groupings and parties from the south were not represented at the various conferences and talks that established the modern state of Sudan. As a result, many southerners did not consider Sudan to be a legitimate state.

== Independent Sudan (1956 to present) ==
=== Independence and the First Civil War ===
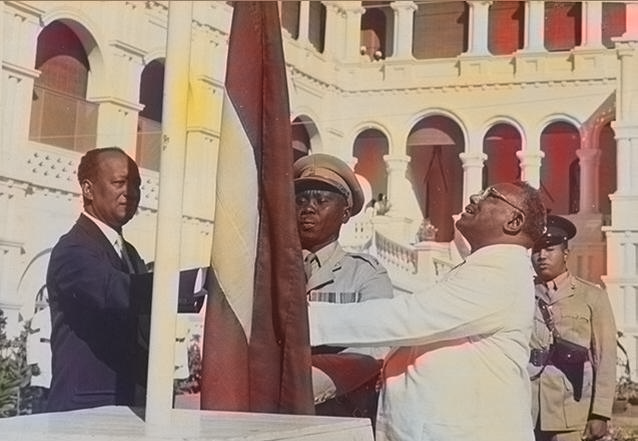
Sudan's flag raised at independence ceremony by the Prime Minister Isma'il al-Azhari and opposition leader Mohamed Ahmed Almahjoub on 1 January 1956

On 12 February 1953, the United Kingdom and the Kingdom of Egypt concluded an agreement providing for Sudanese self-government and self-determination. The transitional period toward independence began with the inauguration of the first parliament in 1954. On 18 August 1955 an army revolt (Torit mutiny) in the southern Sudanese city of Torit broke out, which although quickly suppressed, led to a low level guerrilla insurgency by former southern rebels, and marked the beginning of the First Sudanese Civil War. On 15 December 1955 the Premier of Sudan Ismail al-Azhari announced that Sudan would unilaterally declare independence in four days' time. On 19 December 1955 the Sudanese parliament, unilaterally and unanimously, declared Sudan's independence. The British and Egyptian governments recognized the independence of Sudan on 1 January 1956. The United States was among the first foreign powers to recognize the new state. However, the Arab-led Khartoum government ignored their promises to southerners to create a federal system, which led to a mutiny by southern army officers that sparked seventeen years of civil war (1955–1972). In the early period of the war, hundreds of northern bureaucrats, teachers, and other officials, serving in the south were massacred.

The National Unionist Party (NUP), under Prime Minister Ismail al-Azhari, dominated the first cabinet, which was soon replaced by a coalition of conservative political forces. In 1958, following a period of economic difficulties and political manoeuvring that paralysed public administration, Chief of Staff Major General Ibrahim Abboud overthrew the parliamentary government in a bloodless coup d'état.

Gen. Abboud did not carry out his promises to return Sudan to civilian government, however, and popular resentment against army rule led to a wave of riots and strikes in late October 1964 that forced the military to relinquish power.

The Abboud regime was followed by a provisional government until parliamentary elections in April 1965 led to a coalition government of the Umma and National Unionist Parties under Prime Minister Muhammad Ahmad Mahjoub. Between 1966 and 1969, Sudan had a series of governments that proved unable either to agree on a permanent constitution or to cope with problems of factionalism, economic stagnation, and ethnic dissidence. The succession of early post-independence governments were dominated by Arab Muslims who viewed Sudan as a Muslim Arab state. Indeed, the Umma/NUP proposed 1968 constitution was arguably Sudan's first Islamic-oriented constitution.

==== The Nimeiry Era ====
Dissatisfaction culminated in a coup d'état on 25 May 1969. The coup leader, Col. Gaafar Nimeiry, became prime minister, and the new regime abolished parliament and outlawed all political parties, except the Sudanese Socialist Union as the ruling party. Disputes between Marxist and non-Marxist elements within the ruling military coalition resulted in a briefly successful coup in July 1971, led by the Sudanese Communist Party. Several days later, anti-communist military elements restored Nimeiry to power.

In 1972, the Addis Ababa Agreement led to a cessation of the north–south civil war and a degree of self-rule. This led to a ten year hiatus in the civil war.

Until the early 1970s, Sudan's agricultural output was mostly dedicated to internal consumption. In 1972, the Sudanese government became more pro-Western, and made plans to export food and cash crops. However, commodity prices declined throughout the 1970s causing economic problems for Sudan. At the same time, debt servicing costs, from the money spent mechanizing agriculture, rose. In 1978, the International Monetary Fund (IMF) negotiated a Structural Adjustment Program with the government. This further promoted the mechanized export agriculture sector. This caused great economic problems for the pastoralists of Sudan.

In 1976, the Ansar mounted a bloody but unsuccessful coup attempt. In July 1977, President Nimeiry met with Ansar leader Sadiq al-Mahdi, opening the way for reconciliation. Hundreds of political prisoners were released, and in August a general amnesty was announced for all opponents of Nimeiry's government.

==== Arms suppliers ====
Sudan relied on a variety of countries for its arms supplies. Since independence the army had been trained and supplied by the British, but relations were cut off after the Arab-Israel Six-Day War in 1967. At this time relations with the US and West Germany were also cut off. From 1968 to 1971, the Soviet Union and Eastern Bloc nations sold large numbers of weapons and provided technical assistance and training to Sudan. At this time the army grew in manpower from 18,000 to roughly 60,000 men. Large numbers of tanks, aircraft, and artillery were acquired at this time, and they dominated the army until the late 1980s. Relations cooled between the two sides after the coup in 1971, and the Khartoum government sought to diversify its suppliers. Egypt was the most important military partner in the 1970s, providing missiles, personnel carriers, and other military hardware.

Western countries began supplying Sudan again in the mid-1970s. The United States began selling Sudan a great deal of equipment around 1976. Military sales peaked in 1982 at US$101 million. The alliance with the United States was strengthened under the administration of Ronald Reagan. American aid increased from $5 million in 1979 to $200 million in 1983 and then to $254 million in 1985, mainly for military programs. Sudan thus became the second largest recipient of US aid to Africa (after Egypt). The construction of four air bases to house Rapid Deployment Force units and a powerful listening station for the CIA near Port Sudan was decided.

=== Second Civil War ===
In 1983, the civil war in the south was reignited following the government's Islamification policy which would have instituted Islamic law, among other things. After several years of fighting, the government compromised with southern groups. In 1984 and 1985; after a period of drought, several million people were threatened by famine, particularly in western Sudan. The situation was worsened by the new Government of Sudan attempting to hide the situation internationally.

In March 1985, the announcement of the increase in the prices of basic necessities, at the request of the IMF with which the regime was negotiating, triggered the first demonstrations. On 2 April, eight unions called for mobilization and a "general political strike until the abolition of the current regime". On the 3rd, massive demonstrations shook Khartoum, but also the country's main cities; the strike paralysed institutions and the economy. On 6 April 1985, a group of military officers, led by Lieutenant General Abd ar Rahman Siwar adh Dhahab, overthrew Nimeiri, who took refuge in Egypt. Three days later, Dhahab authorized the creation of a fifteen-man Transitional Military Council (TMC) to rule Sudan.

In June 1986, Sadiq al Mahdi formed a coalition government with Umma Party, the Democratic Unionist Party (DUP), the National Islamic Front (NIF), and four southern parties. Unfortunately, however, Sadiq proved to be a weak leader and incapable of governing Sudan. Party factionalism, corruption, personal rivalries, scandals, and political instability characterized the Sadiq regime. After less than a year in office, Sadiq al Mahdi dismissed the government because it had failed to draft a new penal code to replace the sharia, reach an agreement with the IMF, end the civil war in the south, or devise a scheme to attract remittances from Sudanese expatriates. To retain the support of the DUP and the southern political parties, Sadiq formed another ineffective coalition government.

In 1989, the government and southern rebels began to negotiate an end to the war, but a coup d'état brought a military junta into power which was not interested in compromise. The leader of the junta, Omar al-Bashir, consolidated his power over the next few years, declaring himself president and ruling with the National Congress Party (NCP).

The civil war has displaced more than 4 million southerners. Some fled into southern cities, such as Juba; others trekked as far north as Khartoum and even into Ethiopia, Kenya, Uganda, Egypt, and other neighbouring countries. These people were unable to grow food or earn money to feed themselves, and malnutrition and starvation became widespread. The lack of investment in the south resulted as well in what international humanitarian organizations call a "lost generation" who lack educational opportunities, access to basic health care services, and little prospects for productive employment in the small and weak economies of the south or the north.

In early 2003 a new rebellion of Sudan Liberation Movement/Army (SLM/A) and Justice and Equality Movement (JEM) groups in the western region of Darfur began. The rebels accused the central government of neglecting the Darfur region, although there is uncertainty regarding the objectives of the rebels and whether they merely seek an improved position for Darfur within Sudan or outright secession. Both the government and the rebels have been accused of atrocities in this war, although most of the blame has fallen on Arab militias (Janjaweed) allied with the government. The rebels have alleged that these militias have been engaging in ethnic cleansing in Darfur, and the fighting has displaced hundreds of thousands of people, many of them seeking refuge in neighbouring Chad. There are various estimates on the number of human casualties, ranging from under twenty thousand to several hundred thousand dead, from either direct combat or starvation and disease inflicted by the conflict.

In 2004 Chad brokered negotiations in N'Djamena, leading to the April 8 Humanitarian Ceasefire Agreement between the Sudanese government, the JEM, and the SLA. However, the conflict continued despite the ceasefire, and the African Union (AU) formed a Ceasefire Commission (CFC) to monitor its observance. In August 2004, the African Union sent 150 Rwandan troops in to protect the ceasefire monitors. It, however, soon became apparent that 150 troops would not be enough, so they were joined by 150 Nigerian troops.

On 18 September 2004 United Nations Security Council issued Resolution 1564 declaring that the government of Sudan had not met its commitments, expressing concern at helicopter attacks and assaults by the Janjaweed militia against villages in Darfur. It welcomed the intention of the African Union to enhance its monitoring mission in Darfur and urged all member states to support such efforts. During 2005 the African Union Mission in Sudan force was increased to about 7,000.

The Chadian-Sudanese conflict officially started on 23 December 2004, when the government of Chad declared a state of war with Sudan and called for the citizens of Chad to mobilize themselves against Rally for Democracy and Liberty (RDL) militants (Chadian rebels backed by the Sudanese government) and Sudanese militiamen who attacked villages and towns in eastern Chad, stealing cattle, murdering citizens, and burning houses.

Peace talks between the southern rebels and the government made substantial progress in 2003 and early 2004, although skirmishes in parts of the south have reportedly continued. The two sides have agreed that, following a final peace treaty, southern Sudan will enjoy autonomy for six years, and after the expiration of that period, the people of southern Sudan will be able to vote in a referendum on independence. Furthermore, oil revenues will be divided equally between the government and rebels during the six-year interim period. The ability or willingness of the government to fulfil these promises has been questioned by some observers, however, and the status of three central and eastern provinces was a point of contention in the negotiations. Some observers wondered whether hard line elements in the north would allow the treaty to proceed.

A final peace treaty was signed on 9 January 2005 in Nairobi. The terms of the peace treaty were that the south would have autonomy for six years, followed by a referendum on secession, and both sides of the conflict would merge their armed forces into a 39,000-strong force after six years if the secession referendum should turn out negative. Income from oilfields was to be shared evenly between north and south; jobs were to be split according to varying ratios (central administration: 70 to 30, Abyei/Blue Nile State/Nuba Mountains: 55 to 45, both in favour of the government), and Islamic law was to remain in the north, while continued use of the sharia in the south was to be decided by the elected assembly.

==== Islamisation ====
The decade of the 1990s also experienced a tendency to impose strict Sharia-based Islamic laws and practices under the National Islamic Front and Hassan al-Turabi. Education was overhauled to focus on the importance of Arab and Islamic culture, for example by memorizing the Quran in religious institutions; school uniforms were replaced with combat fatigues and students engaged in paramilitary drills. Religious police ensured that women were veiled, especially in government offices and universities. The former, more tolerant political culture became much harsher, with human rights groups alleging a proliferation of torture chambers known as "ghost houses" used by security agencies. The war against the non-Muslim south was declared a jihad. On state television, actors simulated "weddings" between jihad martyrs and heavenly virgins (houris). Turabi also gave asylum and assistance to non-Sudanese Islamists, including Osama bin Laden and other Al Qaeda members.

== Recent history ==
On 31 August 2006, the United Nations Security Council approved Resolution 1706 to send a new peacekeeping force of 17,300 to Darfur. In the following months, however, UNMIS was not able to deploy to Darfur due to the Government of the Sudan's steadfast opposition to a peacekeeping operation undertaken solely by the United Nations. The UN then embarked on an alternative, innovative approach to try to begin stabilize the region through the phased strengthening of AMIS, before transfer of authority to a joint African Union/United Nations peacekeeping operation. Following prolonged and intensive negotiations with the Government of the Sudan and significant international pressure, it finally accepted the peacekeeping operation in Darfur.

In 2009 the International Criminal Court issued an arrest warrant for al-Bashir, accusing him of crimes against humanity and war crimes. In 2009 and 2010 a series of conflicts between rival nomadic tribes in South Kordofan caused a large number of casualties and displaced thousands.

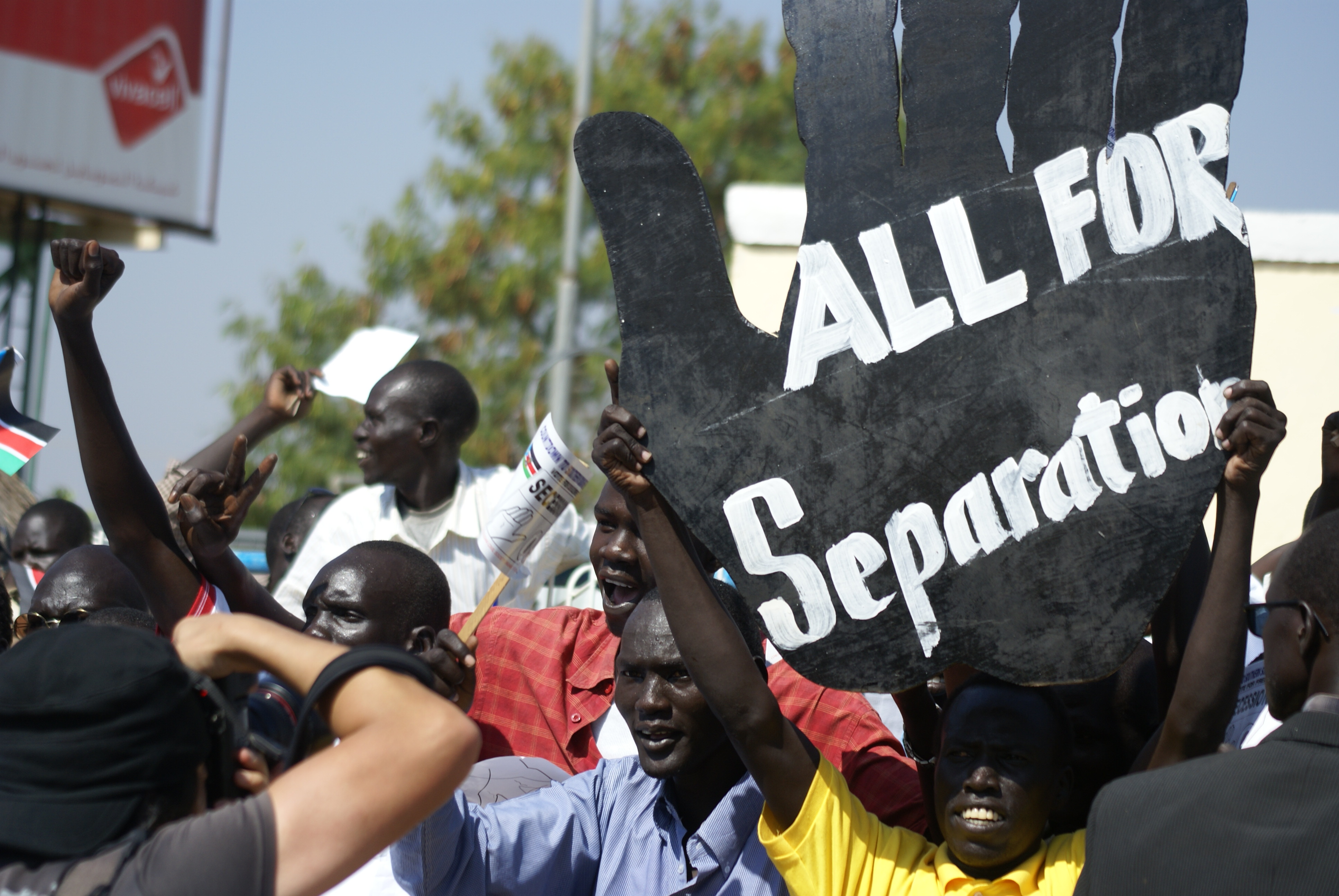
South Sudanese independence referendum, 2011

An agreement for the restoration of harmony between Chad and Sudan, signed 15 January 2010, marked the end of a five-year war between them. The Sudanese government and the JEM signed a ceasefire agreement ending the Darfur conflict in February 2010.

In January 2011, a referendum on independence for Southern Sudan was held, and the South voted overwhelmingly to secede later that year as the Republic of South Sudan, with its capital at Juba and Kiir Mayardit as its first president. Al-Bashir announced that he accepted the result, but violence soon erupted in the disputed region of Abyei, claimed by both the North and the South.

On 6 June 2011 armed conflict broke out in South Kordofan between the forces of Northern and Southern Sudan, ahead of the scheduled independence of the South on 9 July. This was followed by an agreement for both sides to withdraw from Abyei. On 20 June, the parties agreed to demilitarize the contested area of Abyei, where Ethiopian peacekeepers would be deployed. On 9 July 2011, South Sudan became an independent country.

=== After Omar al-Bashir (2019–present) ===
In April 2019, after several months of sustained street protests Sudan's president Omar al-Bashir was ousted. Since the fall of his government, the country has been ruled by the Sovereignty Council of Sudan, made up of both military and civilian representatives as the highest power in the transitional period. Until the next Sudanese General Elections, planned for 2022, the country is to be jointly led by the Chairman of the Transitional Sovereign Council, Abdel Fattah al-Burhan, and Prime Minister Abdallah Hamdok.

Following al-Bashir's removal from power, street protests organised by the Sudanese Professionals Association and democratic opposition groups continued, calling on the ruling Transitional Military Council (TMC) to "immediately and unconditionally" step aside in favour of a civilian-led transitional government, and urging other reforms in Sudan. Negotiations between the TMC and the civilian opposition to form a joint transition government took place during late April and in May, but stopped when the Rapid Support Forces and other TMC security forces killed 128 people in the Khartoum massacre on 3 June 2019.

In October 2020, Sudan concluded an agreement to normalize diplomatic relations with Israel, which was part of the agreement with the United States to remove Sudan from the U.S. list of State Sponsors of Terrorism.

==== 2020–2021 Ethiopian wars ====
During the 2020–2021 Tigray War, Sudan also became collaterally involved. On 18 December 2020, Sudanese military would have been advancing towards the disputed Ethiopia-Sudan border area. An EEPA report stated that the Sudanese Commander-in-Chief, Abdel Fattah al-Burhan, visited the area. Egypt condemned the border attack by Ethiopia on Sudan, and said that it stands in full solidarity with Sudan and called for all measures to ensure that such events do not reoccur. An EEPA report stated that on 18 December 2020, the Sudanese government has accused the Ethiopian government of using artillery against Sudanese troops conducting operations in the border area. Tensions have been rising between the two countries in recent weeks after Sudan reoccupied land that it said was occupied by Ethiopian farmers. The government of Ethiopia has so far not commented on the matter. On 18 December 2020, Sudanese authorities were instructing recently arrived Tigrayan refugees in Hamdayet camp to dismantle and go to the mainland of Sudan in fear of potential war between Ethiopia and Sudan. On 19 December 2020, tension between Ethiopia and Sudan was increasing. Sudan has sent more troops, including Rapid Support Forces, and equipment to the border area. Support from the Beni Amer and al-Habb tribes in the states of Kassala and Gedaref, including food supplies and finances. Talks with Ethiopia have stopped. An EEPA report stated that on 19 December 2020, Sudan had captured Eritrean soldiers dressed in Amhara militia uniforms fighting along the Sudan border alongside Amhara special forces. On 20 December 2020, the Sudanese army had regained control of Jabal Abu Tayyur, in the disputed land on the Ethiopia-Sudan border. Heavy fighting broke out between the Sudanese military and the Ethiopian National Defense Forces (ENDF) and Amhara militia in Metemma near the Ethiopian-Sudanese border.

==== 2021 coup ====
On 25 October 2021, the Sudanese military, led by General Abdel Fattah al-Burhan, took control of the government in a military coup. At least five senior government figures were initially detained. Civilian Prime Minister Abdalla Hamdok refused to declare support for the coup and on 25 October called for popular resistance; he was moved to house arrest on 26 October.

Key civilian groups including the Sudanese Professionals Association and Forces of Freedom and Change called for civil disobedience and refusal to cooperate with the coup organisers.

Faced with internal and international resistance, al-Burhan declared his willingness to restore the Hamdok Cabinet on 28 October, although the deposed Prime Minister declined this initial offer, making any further dialogue conditional on the full restoration of the pre-coup system. On 21 November 2021, Hamdok and al-Burhan signed a 14-point deal that reinstated Hamdok as prime minister and stated that all political prisoners would be freed. Civilian groups including Forces for Freedom and Change and the Sudanese Professionals Association rejected the deal, refusing continued power-sharing with the military.

==== War in Sudan (2023–present) ====
A war between the Sudanese Armed Forces (SAF) and the paramilitary Rapid Support Forces (RSF), rival factions of the military government of Sudan, began on 15 April 2023, with the fighting concentrated around the capital city of Khartoum and the Darfur region. As of 15 August 2023, between 4,000 and 10,000 people had been killed and 6,000 to 12,000 others injured, while as of 12 September 2023, over 4.1 million were internally displaced and more than 1.1 million others had fled the country as refugees.

The war began with attacks by the RSF on government sites as airstrikes, artillery, and gunfire were reported across Sudan. Throughout the conflict, RSF leader Mohamed Hamdan "Hemedti" Dagalo and Sudan's de facto leader and army chief Abdel Fattah al-Burhan have disputed control of government sites in Khartoum, including the general military headquarters, the Presidential Palace, Khartoum International Airport, Burhan's official residence, and the SNBC headquarters, as well as states and towns in Darfur and Kordofan. The two sides were then joined by rebel groups who had previously fought against the two sides. Starting in June, the SPLM-N (al-Hilu) attacked army positions in the south of the country. In July, a faction of the Sudan Liberation Movement led by Mustafa Tambour (SLM-T) officially joined the war in support of the SAF, while in August, the rebel Tamazuj movement based in Darfur and Kordofan joined forces with the RSF.

== See also ==
- Islamism in Sudan
- National Reconciliation
- List of governors of pre-independence Sudan
- List of heads of state of Sudan
- List of heads of government of Sudan
- Politics of Sudan
- Coups d'état in Sudan
- Khartoum history and timeline
- Sudanese transition to democracy (2019–2021)
