= Tuhami =

Tuhami (also its variant Thami) is an Arabic origin surname and a masculine given name. Notable people with the name include:

== Surname ==
- Abdel-Gader Tuhami, Libyan intelligence office
- Anuar Tuhami (born 1995), Moroccan football player
- Hassan Tuhami (1924–2009), Egyptian politician
- Thuraya al-Tuhamy (1948–2020), Sudanese women's rights activist.

== Given name ==
- Thami Mdaghri (died 1856), Moroccan writer and composer
- Tuhami al-Wazzani (1903–1972), Moroccan historian
