= Karl Neufeld =

German writer and undercover agent (1856–1918)

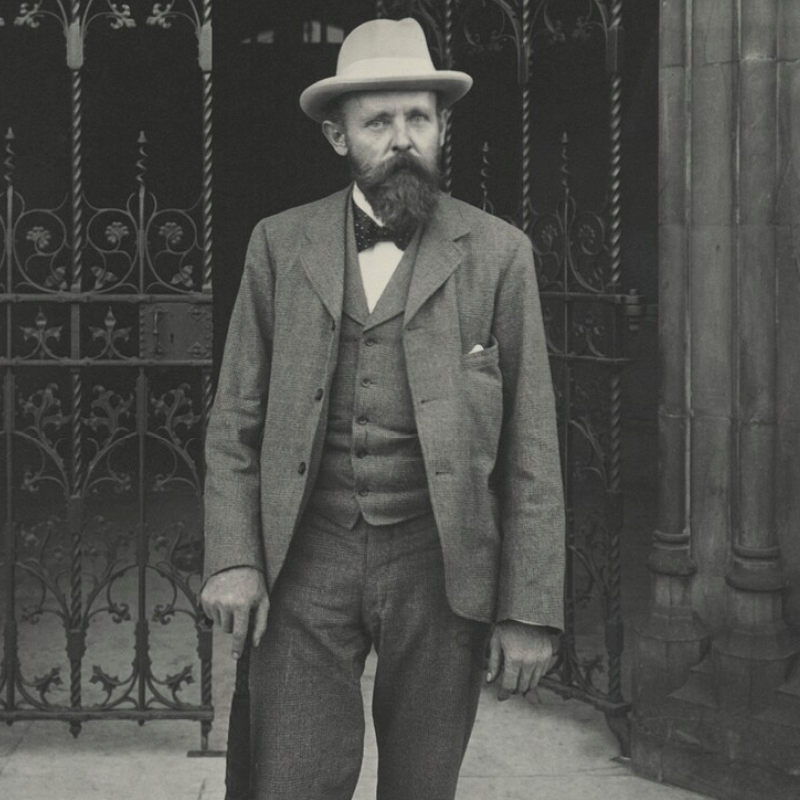
Charles Neufeld, the 'Prisoner of Omdurman' after his release in 1899

Karl Neufeld, also known as Charles Neufeld (4 August 1856 – 2 July 1918) was a German merchant, active in 19th-century Sudan, who was kept as a prisoner by the Mahdist state for twelve years and set free after the British victory over the Mahdist forces. He published his autobiography about this experience under the title A Prisoner of the Khaleefa. Twelve Years Captivity at Omdurman in 1899. During the first half of World War I, Neufeld also acted as translator and undercover agent for the German Empire, trying to incite Arabs against the British Empire.

== Biography ==
Neufeld was born in the German province of West Prussia as the son of a landowner and medical doctor. He studied medicine at the University of Leipzig, but finished his studies without a degree. From around 1880, he worked in Cairo, the capital of Egypt, which was an autonomous tributary state of the Ottoman Empire at the time. He was active first as a pharmacist and later as a merchant and married a British nurse named Emma Netherton, with whom he had a daughter.

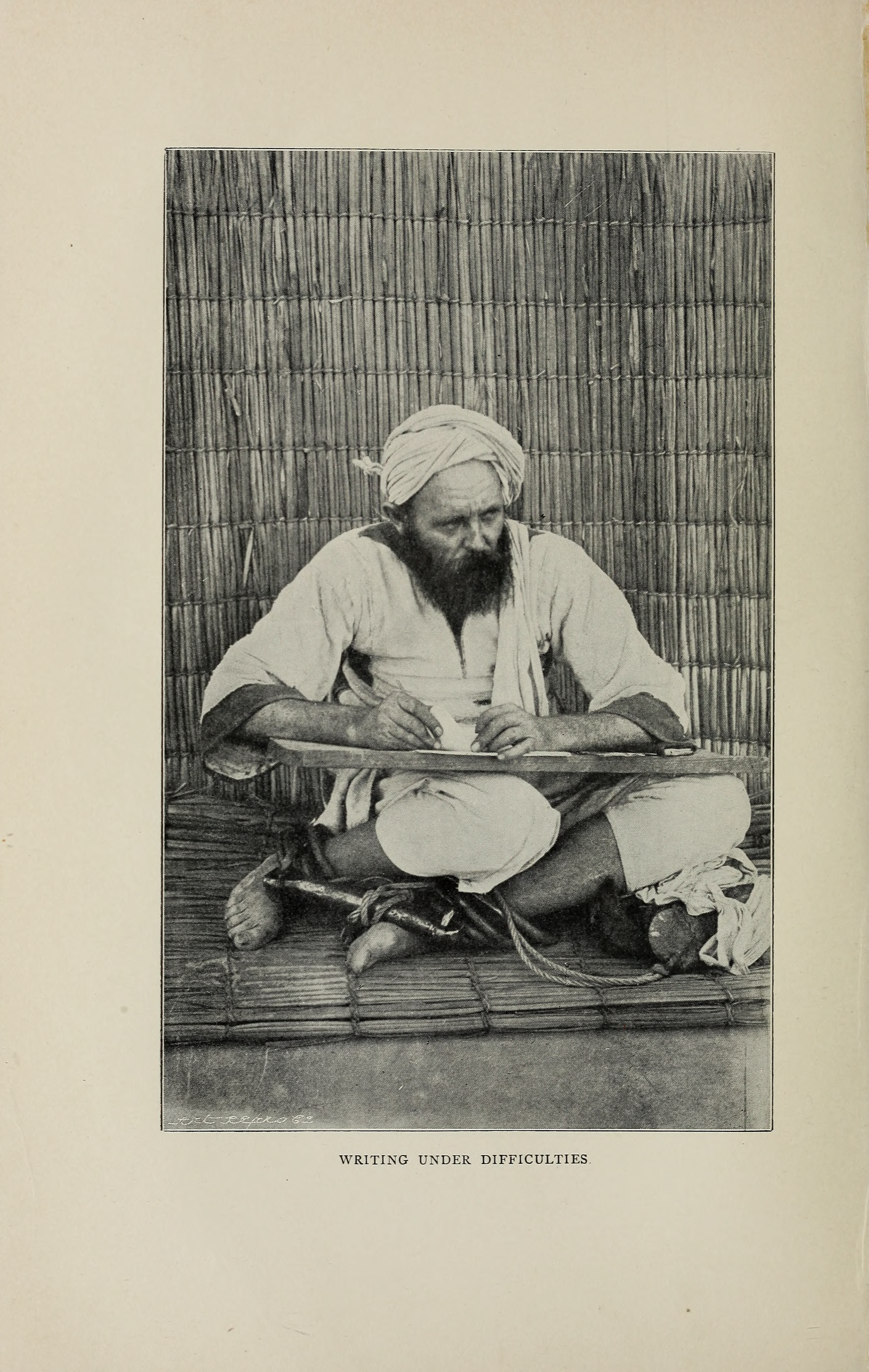
Neufeld "writing under difficulties", as illustrated in his memoir after his years of captivity

Due to his knowledge of English and Arabic, he took part as a translator in the Gordon Relief Expedition and afterwards continued his business in Aswan, Lower Nubia. Travelling with a trade caravan to Kordofan in western Sudan in 1887, he was captured by members of the Mahdist uprising. He spent the next 12 years, mostly in chains, in captivity in Omdurman, where he met the former Governor-General of Darfur, Rudolf Slatin and Comboni missionary Josef Ohrwalder, who were also imprisoned. In captivity, he converted to Islam and married an Abyssinian woman named Umm Shul, with whom he had two children. Neufeld was liberated by Anglo-Egyptian troops in the aftermath of the Battle of Omdurman in 1898 and subsequently returned to Germany.

There, he gave lectures about his imprisonment and published his experiences in 1899 under the title In Ketten des Kalifen. Zwölf Jahre Gefangenschaft in Omdurman, and the same year in an English translation as A Prisoner of the Khaleefa. Twelve Years Captivity at Omdurman.

After his return to Egypt, he set up a sanatorium in Aswan, but was expelled by the British administration after the outbreak of World War I. Employed by the Foreign Office of Imperial Germany as a translator and undercover agent in the Middle East, he travelled to Syria and the Arabian peninsula as part of a German military mission, called the Stotzingen Mission, to set up a planned telegraphic station in Yemen. From there, the Germans wanted to incite people in Sudan and Ethiopia to rise against the British.

The year before, Neufeld had travelled on his own to Medina, where he could convince the authorities that he had converted to Islam many years ago and was known in Sudan by the name of Shaykh ‘Abd Allāh Nawfal al-Almānī. Because of this and his knowledge of Arabic, Neufeld managed to get to know scholars and notables in Medina, and discussed the war in Europe and at the Dardanelles in Turkey. On September 1, 1915, Neufeld was called back to Damascus by the Ottoman authorities.

When the Arab Revolt, a military uprising of Arab forces against the Ottoman Empire broke out in 1916, the German mission had to be cancelled and Neufeld was recalled to Germany. After that, he worked for the German administration in Brussels until his death in 1918.

In the autobiographical account Seven Pillars of Wisdom about his role as a military advisor to Bedouin forces during the Arab Revolt against the Ottoman Turks, T. E. Lawrence wrote about the fatal end of the German mission in Yanbu in western Saudi Arabia:

Behind the Ashraf came the crimson banner of our last tribal detachment, the Rifaa, under Owdi ibn Zuweid, the old wheedling sea-pirate who had robbed the Stotzingen Mission and thrown their wireless and their Indian servants into the sea at Yenbo. The sharks presumably refused the wireless, but we had spent fruitless hours dragging for it in the harbour. Owdi still wore a long, rich, fur-lined German officer's greatcoat, a garment little suited to the climate but, as he insisted, magnificent booty.

— T. E. Lawrence, Seven Pillars of Wisdom, Book II, Chapter XXV.

== See also ==
- History of Sudan - Mahdism and Condominium

== Bibliography ==
- Neufeld, Karl (1899) In Ketten des Kalifen. Zwölf Jahre Gefangenschaft in Omdurman. Berlin: Verlag W. Spemann. (German original version)
- Neufeld, Charles (1899). A Prisoner of the Khaleefa. Twelve Years Captivity at Omdurman. With numerous Portraits and Plans. London: Chapman & Hall, Ltd., 1899 (full text in Wikisource as below)
- Neufeld, Charles (1900) Under the Rebel's Reign. A Story of Egyptian Revolt. London: Wells Gardner, Darton & Co., OCLC 36749791
- Lawrence, T. E. (first ed. 1926). Seven Pillars of Wisdom London: Random House ISBN 978-0-09-951178-6
- Byron Farwell: Prisoners of the Mahdi. New York: Harper & Row, 1967. Reprint: New York and London: W.W. Norton & Company, 1989, pp. 240–284 ISBN 0-393-30579-1
