= Egyptian Sudan =

Egyptian Sudan may refer to:

- Ottoman Egyptian Sudan (1820–1885), Sudan administered by Egypt under nominal Ottoman sovereignty
- Anglo-Egyptian Sudan (1899–1956), Sudan as a condominium between Egypt and the United Kingdom

== See also ==
- History of Sudan, for other polities with Egyptian elements
