= Hassan at-Taheer Zarouq =

Hassan at-Taheer Zarouq (Arabic: حسن الطاهر زروق; 1916–1980) was a Sudanese politician. He worked as a schoolteacher, but was dismissed due to his political activism.

Zarouq was a member of the Sudanese Communist Party and president of the Anti-Imperialist Front. In the 1953 legislative election he was elected to the House of Representatives from the Graduates Constituency as an Anti-Imperialist Front candidate. As a Member of Parliament, Hassan at-Taheer Zarouq was a vocal critic of Ismail al-Azhari's National Unionist Party cabinet.

Zarouq was also an outspoken advocate for equal rights for the South Sudanese. He claimed that imperialism was to blame for the division between North and South Sudanese, but stressed that this inequality was cemented by the Sudanese bourgeoise.

In November 1955, the opposition tried to oust al-Azhari through a vote in the House of Representatives. However, Hassan at-Taheer Zarouq abstained from voting. The Anti-Imperialist Front explained its position that it struggled for principles, rather than against any particular individuals. Instead, the Anti-Imperialist Front called for a national unity government. This move alienated the Anti-Imperialist Front from both the government and the other opposition forces.

He served as editor of al-Midan, the organ of the Anti-Imperialist Front.
