= Ganibatum =

18th-century BC place and people

Ganibatum is a place and people mentioned in the 18th century BC Old Babylonian texts from Mari (modern Tell Harari).

Ganibatum is believed to be located near Dur Yahdun Lim but other suggestions remain viable. In fact there may be several locations associated with the Ganibatum who appear involved in the transport of people and goods along the Euphrates and connected waterways. The Gnbtyw people (Genebtyw or Genebtyu) first appear in Year 32 of the reign of Thutmose III (ca. 1448 BC). and once again in a superscription dating to the time of Ramesses II (Kitchen 1999 p, 104-105).

Previously the Gnbtyw have been sought to the south of Ancient Egypt and associated with the Land of Punt. But this association has relied almost entirely on the similarity of trade goods and uncertain textual contexts (Saleh, 1972). An identification with the Gnbtyw people bringing aromatic goods to Egypt after Thutmose III’s campaign to Syria in the mid 15th century BC has recently been proposed (Storck, 2005). If the newly proposed identification of Ganibatum with Gnbtyw finds acceptance, then the people/place of Ganibatum certainly moved after the destruction of Mari and the decline of Dur Yahdun Lim, perhaps to be connected with Galabatha near the confluence of the Balih and Euphrates (Burke, 1961).

Thutmose III might have encountered the people of Ganibatum (Gnbtyw) in the course of his campaign that explicitly reached the Euphrates in Syria. Indeed slightly later campaigns of Thutmose III in Northern Syria resulted in “presents” (inw) from the even further lands of Babylon, Assur and “Great Hatti” (Singer, 2004 p. 605-607).
