= Sudanese Workers' Trade Union Federation =

SWTUF
- Sudanese Workers' Trade Union Federation
- Founded: 1992
- Location: Sudan
- Members: 800,000 (claimed)

The Sudanese Workers' Trade Union Federation (SWTUF) is the sole national trade union center in the Sudan.

The current SWTUF is a government sponsored trade union federation that was re-organized in 1992 from the original SWTUF which, along with all other trade unions, was dissolved by Omar Hasan Ahmad al-Bashir when he seized power in 1989.

ICTUR reports that the leaders of the dissolved SWTUF were allowed to keep their personal freedom (a concession not afforded to all Sudanese labour unionists) but were restricted from continued activity.

== History ==
In 1949 the Sudan Railways workers' association helped start the national Workers' Congress, which in 1950 became the SWTUF. The SWTUF was closely associated with the Sudan Communist Party (SCP), and its actions were strongly political. It failed to receive government recognition. After national independence, the federation had frequent confrontations with the new government, including a successful general strike in October 1958. That strike was one of the factors that contributed to the military takeover of the government the following month.

The SWTUF controlled roughly 70 percent of all labor-union membership by the 1958 coup. The new military government repealed the 1948 ordinance, dissolved all unions, and detained many of the federation's leaders.

Upon restoration of the civilian government in 1964, the SWTUF reemerged, and union membership increased rapidly.

SWTUF leadership remained in communist hands. After the abortive communist coup in mid-1971, the government dissolved the SWTUF and executed a number of its leaders.

In the early 1970s, the SWTUF was reinstituted. Prior to 1989, the SWTUF, in its weakened state, included 42 trade unions, representing more than 1.7 million workers in the public and private sectors.

Following the 1989 coup, the Revolutionary Command Council for National Salvation temporarily suspended the right to organize and bargain collectively and prescribed punishments, including the death penalty, for violations of its labor decrees. Many union leaders were arrested. Prior to the 1989 coup, leaders of the SWTUF formed a union in exile, the Legitimate Sudan Workers Trade Union Federation, which carried on secret trade union activities in Sudan.

The 1998 constitution provided the right of association for trade-union purposes, but as of 2011 the government continued to restrict this right. Only the government-controlled SWTUF, the leading blue-collar labor organization with about 800,000 members, functioned legally.
