= Anti-Imperialist Front =

Anti-Imperialist Front الجبهة المعادية للإستعمار
- President: Hassan at-Taheer Zarouq
- General Secretary: Abdel Rahman Abdel Rahim
- Founded: 1952
- Dissolved: 1958
- Newspaper: Al-Midan
- Ideology: Communism; Marxism-Leninism; Anti-imperialism
- Political position: Far-left

The Anti-Imperialist Front (Arabic: الجبهة المعادية للإستعمار) was a political movement in Sudan, founded in 1952. The Anti-Imperialist Front was organized by the clandestine Sudanese Movement for National Liberation (i.e. the communist party). The communists decided not to try to register their own party ahead of the 1953 legislative election, preferring to launch the Anti-Imperialist Front as their legal umbrella organization.

== Leadership ==
Hassan at-Taheer Zarouq was the president of the Anti-Imperialist Front, Abdel Rahman Abdel Rahim was its general secretary. Both were teachers by profession. Dr. Izzudin Ali Amir was another prominent leader of the Anti-Imperialist Front.

== Profile ==
The membership of the Anti-Imperialist Front included both communist cadres and unaffiliated sympathizers. The organization, whilst generally identified with the communists, rejected the claim that it was a communist movement.

The Anti-Imperialist Front advocated for independence for Sudan, opposed a union with Egypt and called for guarantees for democratic rights such as freedom of expression and organization. By raising democratic demands through the Anti-Imperialist Front the Sudanese communists were able to win sympathies amongst non-communist professionals, particularly journalists.

The organization also ran evening schools for adults.

== Press organ ==
The Anti-Imperialist Front published the twice-weekly newspaper al-Midan ('The Forum'). Hassan at-Taheer Zarouq served as the editor of the newspaper.

== 1953 election ==
The Anti-Imperialist Front won one seat in the 1953 election (held by Hassan at-Taheer Zarouq). Hassan at-Taheer Zarouq was a schoolteacher, who had been dismissed due to his political activism. He was elected from the Graduates' Constituency. As a Member of Parliament, Hassan at-Taheer Zarouq was a vocal critic of Ismail al-Azhari's National Unionist Party cabinet.

== Struggle against the al-Azhari government ==
In early 1955 the Anti-Imperialist Front joined the Independence Front (a coalition of opponents to az-Zahari, including the Umma Party). Through the participation of the Anti-Imperialist Front, the Independence Front gained more influence in urban areas as workers' and students' movements became active in the Independence Front. The Anti-Imperialist Front broke away from the Independence Front in September 1955. In November 1955 the Independence Front tried to oust al-Azhari through a vote in the House of Representatives. The Anti-Imperialist Front refused to support this action, and Hassan at-Taheer Zarouq abstained from voting. The Anti-Imperialist Front explained its position that it struggled for principles, rather against any particular individuals. Instead, the Anti-Imperialist Front called for a national unity government. This move alienated the Anti-Imperialist Front from both the government and the other opposition forces.

When the al-Azhari cabinet was followed by the government of Abdallah Khalil, the Anti-Imperialist Front retained its oppositional stance. Again, the Anti-Imperialist Front sought to build a broad, national front. However, such a front did not materialize as the People's Democratic Party (whom the communists had identified as a potential key partner) aligned with the Umma Party instead.

== Suez Crisis ==
During the 1956 Suez Crisis, the Anti-Imperialist Front sent volunteers to help the Egyptian side (including its General Secretary). As Gamal Abdul Nasser emerged as an anti-imperialist leader, the Anti-Imperialist Front reversed its previous opposition to Egyptian-Sudanese unity.

In February 1957 the Anti-Imperialist Front and the Sudanese Workers' Trade Union Federation began campaigning against the introduction of a U.S. aid programme. The Anti-Imperialist Front struggled against the electoral law passed by the Umma-PDP coalition in June 1957, claiming that the law had been tailor-made to guarantee an Umma Party victory in the coming elections. The Anti-Imperialist Front again called on the PDP to break its alliance with the Umma Party, and join a coalition with the National Unionist Party.

== 1958 election ==
Ahead of the February 1958 elections, the Anti-Imperialist Front joined hands with the Federal Party (based in southern Sudan). The Anti-Imperialist Front raised demands for a federal Sudanese state, which would recognize both Islam and Christianity as official religions and where both Arabic and English would be official languages. The Anti-Imperialist Front, contesting the 1958 election, failed to win any seats.

== 1958 coup ==
Following the 1958 coup d'état, the Anti-Imperialist Front was dissolved. Many of its leaders were arrested, including Dr. Izzudin Ali Amir. He was, however, released in September 1959.
