= Land of the Gods =

Land of the Gods may refer to:

- Uttarakhand, state of India, on account of the number of Hindu sacred places there
- Himachal Pradesh, state of India
- Manipur, state of India, in Meitei mythology and folklore
- Greece, in Greek literature and mythology
- Land of Punt, by the Ancient Egyptians
