= Akhbar ul-Usbu'a (1966) =

Newspaper in Sudan

- Type: Weekly newspaper
- Founder: Awad Biraid
- Founded: 1966
- Ceased publication: 1970
- Political alignment: pro-Communist
- Language: Arabic language

Akhbar ul-Usbu'a (Arabic: أخبار الأسبوع, 'News of the Week') was an Arabic-language weekly newspaper published in Sudan from 1966 to 1970. It was issued by Awad Biraid. The newspaper was closely linked to the Sudanese Communist Party, and provided the Sudanese communists with a legal press after their party and main organ (al-Midan) had been banned.
