= Omdurman (journal) =

Political magazine in Egypt (1945–1946)

- Editor: Abdu Dhahab Hasanayn
- Categories: Political magazine
- Founded: 1945
- First issue: 15 March 1945
- Final issue: 1 July 1946
- Country: Egypt
- Based in: Cairo
- Language: Arabic

Omdurman (Arabic: أم درمان) was a communist publication issued from Cairo 1945-1946, directed towards Sudanese community in Egypt. The group of Sudanese communists that worked around the journal would later return to Sudan and build the Sudanese Communist Party.

In 1944 Henri Curiel recruited a small group of Sudanese students in Cairo to his Egyptian Movement for National Liberation (HAMTU), and Omdurman became the organ of this group. The first issue was published on 15 March 1945. At the time Omdurman was one of two legal publications linked to HAMTU. Issues of Omdurman included editorial column, news coverage, political commentaries, articles on science, poetry, cultural and music reviews and specific sections for students and women. The Omdurman faction consisted of some 25-30 individuals. Muhammad Amin Husayn al-Muhami was the owner of the periodical, whilst Abdu Dhahab Hasanayn was its editor.

Omdurman became popular among Sudanese in Cairo. It was read by hundreds of Sudanese students, who otherwise were generally unable to obtain sufficient news coverage from their home country. Whilst mainstream Egyptian parties supported the notion of Egyptian-Sudanese union, HAMTU supported the right of self-determination of Sudan and that Egyptian and Sudanese peoples should fight together against British imperialism. As of 1946 Omdurman argued that 'those here, in Egypt, that call for unity without talking about self-determination are not less dangerous than those, in Sudan, that call for separation.' Omdurman focused heavily on questions on Sudanese social, economic, political and cultural issues. It talked about the conditions of Sudanese students in Egypt. The publication had significant impact on the first generation of leaders of the Sudanese communist movement.

Abdel Khaliq Mahjub, Abdu Dhabab Hasnayan and Shafeah Ahmed travelled to Khartoum, to build the communist movement there. The Omdurman group met with a small Khartoum-based faction of communists, that had been organized by a British soldier named Herbert Storey (member of the Communist Party of Great Britain), and on 10 August 1945 the two factions agreed to build the Sudanese Movement for National Liberation as a united organization (by 1946 the Sudanese Movement for National Liberation - which later became the Sudanese Communist Party - had been established).

The last issue of Omdurman was published on 1 July 1946. Omdurman was shut down on 12 July 1946, as part of a crackdown by the Ismail Sidky government against leftist movements and publications.
