= Muhammad Ibrahim Nugud =

Sudanese politician (1930–2012)

- محمد إبراهيم نقد

General Secretary of the Sudanese Communist Party
- In office c. July 1971 – 22 March 2012
- Preceded by: Abdel Khaliq Mahjub
- Succeeded by: Muhammad Mukhtar al-Khatib

Personal details
- Born: 1930 Qatina, White Nile, Sudan
- Died: 22 March 2012 (aged 81–82) London, United Kingdom
- Party: Sudanese Communist Party

Muhammad Ibrahim Nugud (1930 – 22 March 2012) was a Sudanese politician who was General Secretary of the Sudanese Communist Party. He succeeded Abdel Khaliq Mahjub after the latter's execution in 1971, leading the party for over four decades; his leadership was viewed as a period of long decline for the party. He stood as a candidate in the 2010 presidential election, but performed poorly. Nugud died in London in March 2012, when he was about 80 years old.
