= Muhammad Mukhtar al-Khatib =

General Secretary of the Sudanese Communist Party since 2012

- محمد مختار الخطيب
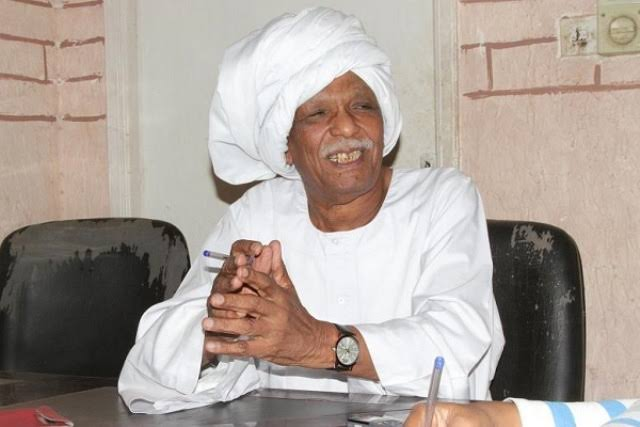

General Secretary of the Sudanese Communist Party
- Incumbent
- Assumed office 22 March 2012
- Preceded by: Muhammad Ibrahim Nugud

Personal details
- Born: 1942 (age 83–84)
- Party: Sudanese Communist Party

Muhammad Mukhtar al-Khatib (born 1942) is a Sudanese politician, currently serving as the General Secretary of the Sudanese Communist Party. He succeeded longtime party leader Muhammad Ibrahim Nugud following the latter's death on 22 March 2012.

In May 2022, he was arrested, detained, and then released at a Khartoum airport by Sudanese security forces, during widespread protest against the military government. Security forces also raided his home.

Under his leadership, the SCP called for an immediate ceasefire between rival factions of the military government which began clashing on 15 April 2023. The Rapid Support Forces later raided and occupied the SCP's headquarters in Khartoum on 25 May 2023.
