= Butana Group =

Prehistoric, Neolithic culture in the eastern part of Sudan

Butana culture
- Geographical range: Eastern Sudan and western Eritrea
- Period: Neolithic
- Dates: c. 4000 BC – c. 3000 BC
- Preceded by: Malawiya culture
- Followed by: Gash culture

The Butana Group was a prehistoric, Neolithic culture in the eastern part of modern Sudan, that flourished from the fourth to the early third millennium BC.

The Butana Group is mainly known from its pottery that is often decorated with incised lines, including fingerprints. The ceramic is comparable to those from other (late) neolithic culture in the Sudanese Nile Valley. They produced stone tools. The main economical base was most likely animal breeding, but there is also evidence for domesticated forms of wheat and barley, attesting agriculture. Several animals were hunted such as antelopes, suidae and elephants. Shell middens indicate the extensive use of land snails for food.

Not much is known about settlement patterns, but some settlement sites are almost 10 hectares (25 acres) in area, indicating longer occupations. The people of the Butana Group lived in small, round huts. Not many cemeteries are known, but people were most often buried in a contracted position. The only grave goods are personal adornments, including many lip plugs.

== Sources ==
- Manzo, Andrea (2017). Eastern Sudan in its Setting, The archaeology of a region far from the Nile Valley. Archaeopress. Archived from the original on 2019-04-14.
