= Abdel-Gader Tuhami =

Libyan intelligence officer

Abdel-Gader Tuhami is a Libyan intelligence officer who is reported to have been appointed head of Libya's intelligence agency. He was present at the Libyan embassy siege of 1984 which followed the shooting of police officer Yvonne Fletcher outside the embassy. Fletcher subsequently died in hospital.
