= Hamdayet Border Reception Centre =

- refugee centre
- Location within Sudan
- Coordinates: 14.26840°N 36.53175°E
- Country: Sudan
- Region: Eastern Sudan States Coordinating Council
- State: Kassala State

Hamdayet Border Reception Centre is a refugee reception centre in eastern Sudan used for Ethiopian refugees fleeing the Tigray War that started in November 2020.

== Location ==
Hamdayet Border Reception Centre is located in a small village Hamdayet within the larger village of Wad Muzammil (Arabic: ود مزمل), which lies between the Setit River (known as Tekezé River in much of Ethiopia) and the Eritrean border, close to Sudan's eastern border with Ethiopia.

Hamdayet administratively lies in Kassala State and is close to el-Gadarif city. Hamdayet is small. As of 2021, it has no electricity or water supplies, with only one medical clinic, operated by Médecins Sans Frontières. Telephone, television and internet connectivity is weak. The local market is open at 06:00 and closes at 16:00. There are no motels or accommodation. Grass made huts are available for rent. The temperatures are extremely hot during the daytime and mild in the evenings.

== Refugee facility ==
In late November 2020, United Nations High Commissioner for Refugees Filippo Grandi visited Hamdayet and spoke with refugees there. As of 4 December 2020, 47,000 Ethiopian refugees had arrived in Sudan according to the United Nations High Commissioner for Refugees (UNHCR). Among these, 11,150 had been transferred from Hamdayet and another border camp, Abderafi, to the Um Rakuba refugee camp 70 km from the Sudanese border.
