= Gash Group =

Neolithic, prehistoric culture

Gash culture
- Geographical range: Eritrea and eastern Sudan
- Period: Neolithic
- Dates: c. 3000 BC – c. 1800 BC
- Preceded by: Butana culture
- Followed by: Jebel Mokram culture

The Gash Group is a Neolithic, prehistoric culture that flourished around 3000 to 1800 BC in Eritrea and eastern Sudan. It was followed by the Jebel Mokram Group. The name Gash relates to the river in Eritrea with the same name.

== Description ==
This culture is mainly defined by its pottery. In the early phase around 2500 BC these are often bowls decorated with a comb pattern. Typical for the middle phase of the culture are black cups.

Around 2000 BC bowls and cups are typical with impressed or incised rim bands. Certain pottery vessels also show connections with other cultures, such as with Kerma culture, the C-Group, the Pan-Grave and the Yemeni Bronze Age.

Finds of Egyptian pottery and faience beads (perhaps made in Egypt) indicate contact to this country as well as to the Red Sea as Red Sea shells show.

A ceramic-bearing culture known as the Butana Group preceded the Gash culture.

== Mahal Teglinos ==
At Mahal Teglinos (at Kassala, eastern Sudan) was found a large settlement with two cemeteries and the living quarters in between. Most people lived in flimsy round huts known from post holes. In the center of the settlement were several rectangular mud brick buildings. These are the earliest and most southern mud brick structures of the 3rd and 2nd millennium BC in Africa.

At the eastern edge of Mahal Teglinos, a large cemetery was excavated. The dead were placed there in different positions. The only grave goods were personal adornments. At the western cemetery of Mahal Teglinos rough stone stelae were found as tomb markers. Some burials contained two bodies and it has been suggested that one of the dead was sacrificed. In this cemetery some burials also contained vessels as burial good.

In the middle of town, there is evidence for food production on a larger scale, perhaps relating to funeral rituals. Furthermore, seals and seal impressions were found in the settlement indicating a high level of organisation.

== Agriculture ==
Wild and domestic plants were found in Gash Group settlements, indicating a mixed economy between gathering and farming.

Recently it has been suggested that Sudan and the northern Horn of Africa have significantly contributed to the development of early agriculture in the Middle East and Asia. Gash culture is mentioned as playing an important role in this.

== Land of Punt connections ==
It has been suggested that the Gash Group was Punt or at least part of it. The Egyptian pottery found is markedly different to those found at Kerma suggesting that other trade routes. Red shells were often used for personal adornments demonstrating close contacts to the Red Sea.

== See also ==
- Agordat
- Jebel Mokram Group
