= Thuraya al-Tuhamy =

Sudanese women's rights activist (1948–2020)

- ثريا التهامي
- Born: 1948; Khartoum, Hilla Jadida, Sudan
- Died: 2020 (aged 71–72)
- Occupation: women's rights activist
- Political party: Sudanese Communist Party; National Democratic Alliance (Sudan)

Thuraya al-Tuhamy (Arabic: ثريا التهامي; 1948–2020) was a Sudanese women's rights activist.

== Biography ==
al-Tuhamy was born in Khartoum, Hilla Jadida, in 1948.

She worked for the Sudanese Women Union and the Sudanese Communist Party, before being employed at the feminist magazine Sawt al-Mara’ (Woman's Voice). She later became a member of the National Democratic Alliance (NDA).

In 2005, al-Tuhamy called for Sudanese women to form their own political party during an interview with the Sudan Radio Service (SRS) in Nairobi, Kenya. She also said that she believes Islamic Sharia laws discriminate against women.

She died in 2020.
