= Jebel Mokram Group =

African Neolithic culture

Jebel Mokram culture
- Geographical range: Eastern Sudan and western Eritrea
- Period: Neolithic
- Dates: c. 1800 BC – c. 800 BC
- Preceded by: Gash culture
- Followed by: Hagiz culture

The Jebel Mokram Group was a prehistoric, Neolithic culture that flourished in the second millennium BC in the east of the Sudan and in western Eritrea. The culture appeared around 1800 BCE and followed the Gash Group.

So far, the culture is little researched and is mainly known from a few archaeological sites. The Jebel Mokram Group is characterized by its pottery. Thick and round vessel rims are typical. Vessels are often decorated with an incised net pattern. Similar pottery is known from the Pan-grave people of Sudan and Egypt and also from the Kerma culture. Different types of stone tools were used. Fragments of Egyptian pottery attest some sort of contacts with Egypt. The Jebel Mokram Group produced small clay figures of animals. Several settlement site are known, providing evidence that the Jebel Mokram Group people lived in light huts. It seems that they were basically herdsmen.

Recent archaeological finds of Egyptian pottery in Jebel Mokram Group assemblages provide more details about contacts with Egypt. Eastern Sudan was interacting with Egypt in the second half of the third and into the second millennium BC.

== Literature ==
- Manzo, Andrea (2020). "Back to Mahal Teglinos: New Pharaonic Evidence from Eastern Sudan". The Journal of Egyptian Archaeology. 106 (1–2). SAGE Publications: 89–104. doi:10.1177/0307513320966615. hdl:11574/196305. ISSN 0307-5133.
