= Land of Punt =

Ancient trading confederation in the Horn of Africa (2500 BCE – 980 BCE)

Punt
- Egyptian empire (highlighted) with Punt in South-East corner (commonly agreed location)
- Geographical range: Horn of Africa
- Dates: c. 2500–980 BCE

The Land of Punt (Egyptian: pwnt; alternate Egyptological readings Pwene(t) /puːnt/) was an ancient kingdom known from Ancient Egyptian trade records. It produced and exported gold, aromatic resins, blackwood, ebony, ivory and wild animals. Recent evidence locates it in northwestern Eritrea. It is possible that it includes or corresponds to Opone, as later known by the ancient Greeks, while some biblical scholars have identified it with the biblical land of Put or Havilah.

At times Punt is referred to as Ta netjer (tꜣ nṯr), lit. 'Land of the God' in Egyptian textual records. The exact location of Punt is debated by historians. Various locations have been offered, southeast of Egypt, a coastal region south of it along the Red Sea, Gulf of Aden and the Indian Ocean, in present day north-east Sudan, Eritrea, northeast Ethiopia, Djibouti and northern Somalia, including Somaliland.

A majority of historical scholars now situate the location of Punt in African lands south-east of Egypt or in East Africa. The assumed location has generally been applied to territories covering Somalia, Sudan, Ethiopia and Eritrea.

It is also possible that it covered both the Horn of Africa and the area across the sea, in Southern Arabia. The autonomous state of Puntland, the modern day Somali administrative region at the tip of the Horn of Africa, is named in honor of this ancient kingdom.

== Egyptian expeditions to Punt ==
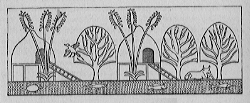
A landscape of Punt, showing several houses on stilts, two fruiting date palms, three myrrh trees, a bird (Hedydipna metallica), a cow, an unidentified fish and a turtle, in water which in the original was green to show that it is salt or tidal, in a sketch from the walls of the mortuary temple of Hatshepsut at Deir el-Bahri, depicting a royal expedition to Punt

The earliest recorded ancient Egyptian expedition to Punt was organized by Pharaoh Sahure of the Fifth Dynasty (25th century BC), returning with cargoes of antyue and Puntites. However, gold from Punt is recorded as having been in Egypt as early as the time of Pharaoh Khufu of the Fourth Dynasty.

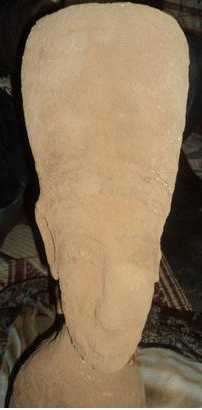
Excavations of a sculptured Puntite Queen donning the royal cap-crown of ancient Egypt. Sourced from Northern Somalia

Subsequently, there were more expeditions to Punt in the Sixth, Eleventh, Twelfth and Eighteenth dynasties of Egypt. In the Twelfth Dynasty, trade with Punt was celebrated in popular literature in the Tale of the Shipwrecked Sailor.

In the reign of Mentuhotep III (11th dynasty, ca. 2000 BC), an officer named Hannu organized one or more voyages to Punt, but it is uncertain whether he personally traveled on these expeditions. Trading missions of the 12th dynasty pharaohs Senusret I, Amenemhat II and Amenemhat IV had also successfully navigated their way to and from the mysterious land of Punt.

In the Eighteenth Dynasty of Egypt, Hatshepsut built a Red Sea fleet to facilitate trade between the head of the Gulf of Aqaba and points south as far as Punt to bring mortuary goods to Karnak in exchange for Nubian gold. Hatshepsut personally made the most famous ancient Egyptian expedition that sailed to Punt. Her artists revealing much about the royals, inhabitants, habitation and variety of trees on the island, revealing it as the "Land of the Gods, a region far to the east in the direction of the sunrise, blessed with products for religious purposes", where traders returned with gold, ivory, ebony, incense, aromatic resins, animal skins, live animals, eye-makeup cosmetics, fragrant woods, and cinnamon. During the reign of Queen Hatshepsut in the 15th century BC, ships regularly crossed the Red Sea in order to obtain bitumen, copper, carved amulets, naptha and other goods transported overland and down the Dead Sea to Elat at the head of the gulf of Aqaba where they were joined with frankincense and myrrh coming north both by sea and overland along trade routes through the mountains running north along the east coast of the Red Sea.

A 2005 expedition to Mersa/Wadi Gawasis, Egypt by archaeologist Kathryn Bard found remains of Egyptian seagoing vessels and hieroglyphic texts on stelae about royal expeditions to Punt, including cedar planks from Queen Hatshepsut's expedition in the 15th century BCE, demonstrating that Mersa/Wadi Gawasis was the port in Egypt from which trade to Punt some 1200 km south on the Red Sea was carried out.

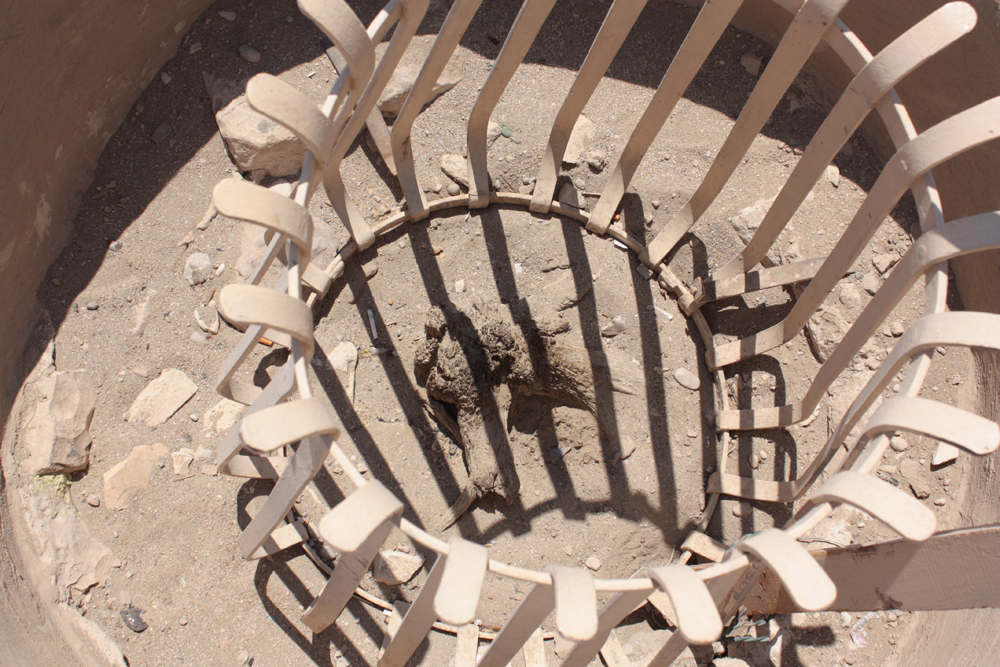
A tree in front of Hatshepsut's temple, claimed to have been brought from Punt by Hatshepsut's Expedition, which is depicted on the Temple walls

A report of that five-ship voyage survives on reliefs in Hatshepsut's mortuary temple at Deir el-Bahri. Throughout the temple texts, Hatshepsut "maintains the fiction that her envoy" Chancellor Nehsi, who is mentioned as the head of the expedition, had travelled to Punt "in order to extract tribute from the natives" who admit their allegiance to the Egyptian pharaoh. In reality, Nehsi's expedition was a simple trading mission to a land, Punt, which was by this time a well-established trading post. Moreover, Nehsi's visit to Punt was not inordinately brave since he was "accompanied by at least five shiploads of [Egyptian] marines" and greeted warmly by the chief of Punt and his immediate family. The Puntites "traded not only in their own produce of incense, ebony and short-horned cattle, but [also] in goods from other African states including gold, ivory and animal skins." According to the temple reliefs, the Land of Punt was ruled at that time by King Parahu and Queen Ati. This well illustrated expedition of Hatshepsut occurred in Year 9 of the female pharaoh's reign with the blessing of the god Amun:

Said by Amen, the Lord of the Thrones of the Two Land: "Come, come in peace my daughter, the graceful, who art in my heart, King Maatkare [i.e. Hatshepsut]... I will give thee Punt, the whole of it... I will lead your soldiers by land and by water, on mysterious shores, which join the harbours of incense... They will take incense as much as they like. They will load their ships to the satisfaction of their hearts with trees of green [i.e., fresh] incense, and all the good things of the land."

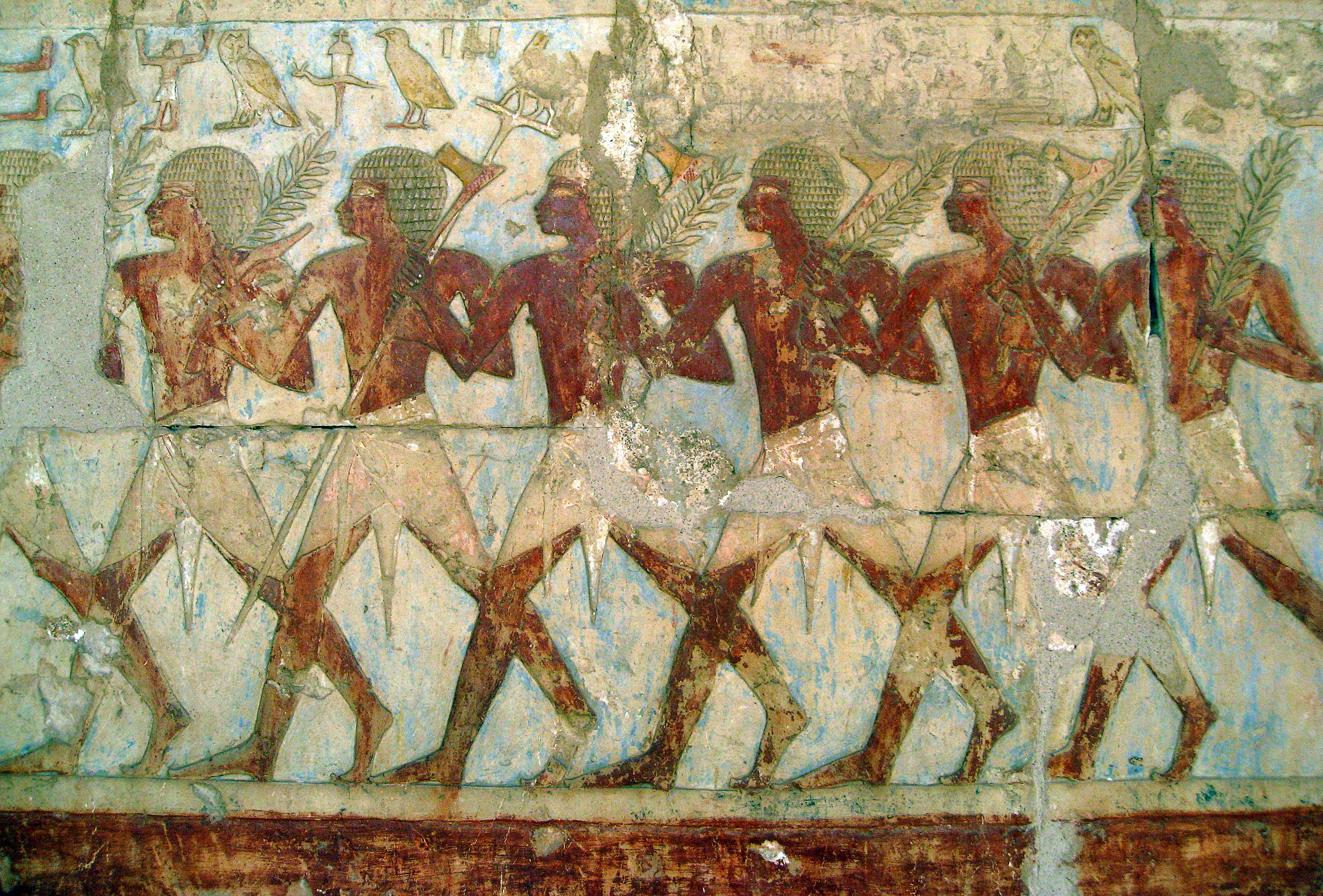
Egyptian soldiers from Hatshepsut's expedition to the Land of Punt as depicted from her temple at Deir el-Bahri

While the Egyptians "were not particularly well versed in the hazards of sea travel, and the long voyage to Punt must have seemed something akin to a journey to the moon for present-day explorers... the rewards of [obtaining frankincense, ebony and myrrh] clearly outweighed the risks." An extensive account of the expedition, based on the tableaux, was provided by Amelia Edwards in 1891.

According to Stuart Tyson Smith, Egyptologist and professor of anthropology at University of California, Santa Barbara, "The scene of an expedition to Punt from Queen Hatshepsuis mortuary complex at Deir el-Bahri shows Puntites with red skin and facial features similar to Egyptians, long or bobbed hair, goatee beards, and kilts".

Hatshepsut's 18th dynasty successors, such as Thutmose III and Amenhotep III, also continued the Egyptian tradition of trading with Punt. The trade with Punt continued into the start of the 20th dynasty before terminating prior to the end of Egypt's New Kingdom. Papyrus Harris I, a contemporary Egyptian document that details events that occurred in the reign of the early 20th dynasty king Ramesses III, includes an explicit description of an Egyptian expedition's return from Punt:

They arrived safely at the desert-country of Coptos: they moored in peace, carrying the goods they had brought. [The goods] were loaded, in travelling overland, upon asses and upon men, being reloaded into vessels at the harbour of Coptos. [The goods and the Puntites] were sent forward downstream, arriving in festivity, bringing tribute into the royal presence.

After the end of the New Kingdom period, Punt became "an unreal and fabulous land of myths and legends." However, Egyptians continued to compose love songs about Punt, "When I hold my love close, and her arms steal around me, I'm like a man translated to Punt, or like someone out in the reedflats, when the world suddenly bursts into flower."

== Ta netjer and connections with Ancient Egypt ==
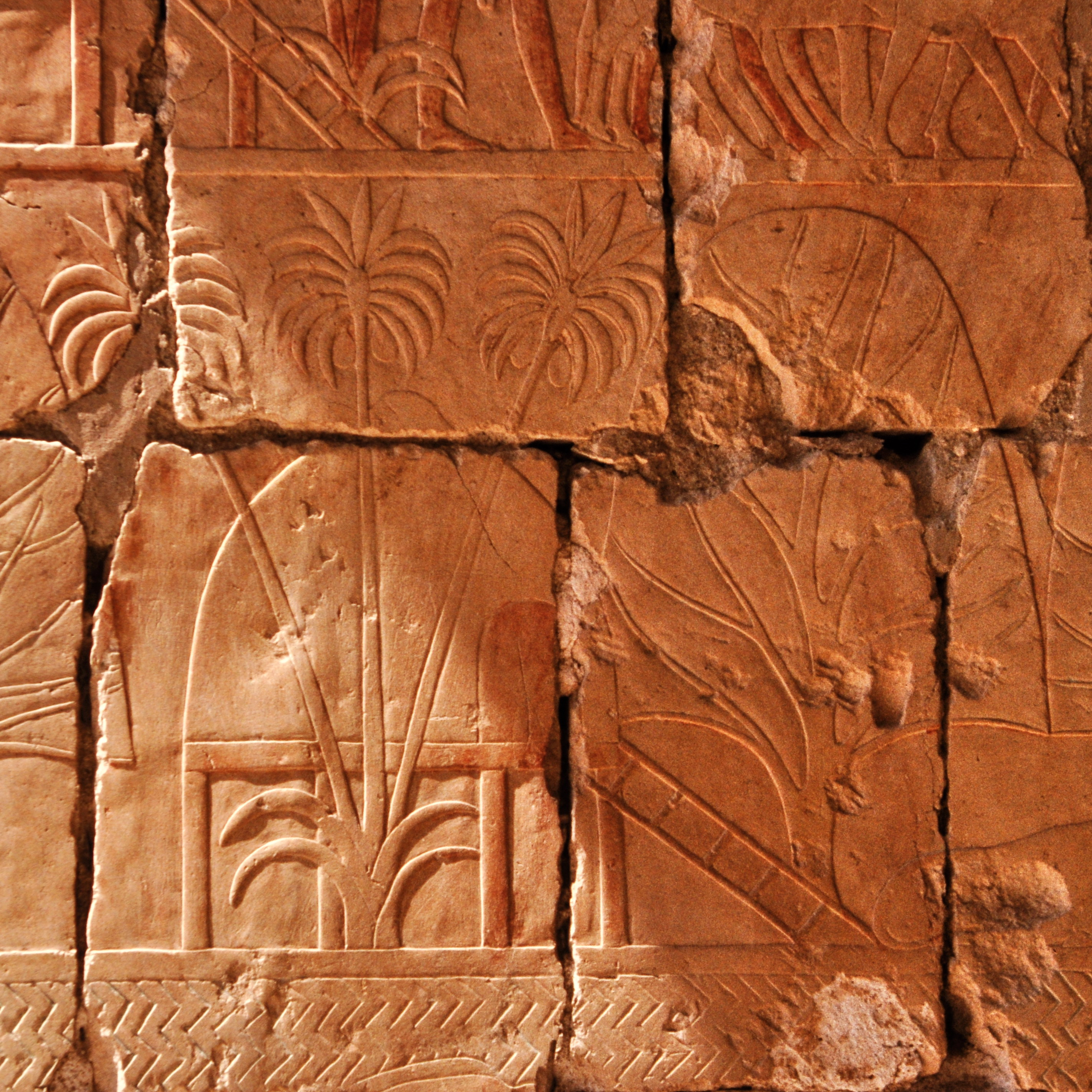
This relief depicts incense and myrrh trees obtained by Hatshepsut's expedition to Punt

At times, the ancient Egyptians called Punt Ta netjer (tꜣ nṯr), meaning "God's Land". This referred to the fact that it was among the regions of the Sun God, that is, the regions located in the direction of the sunrise, to the East of Egypt. These eastern regions' resources included products used in temples, notably incense. Older literature maintained that the label "God's Land", when interpreted as "Holy Land" or "Land of the gods/ancestors", meant that the ancient Egyptians viewed the Land of Punt as their ancestral homeland. W. M. Flinders Petrie believed that the Dynastic Race came from or through Punt and that "Pan, or Punt, was a district at the south end of the Red Sea, which probably embraced both the African and Arabian shores." Moreover, E. A. Wallis Budge stated that "Egyptian tradition of the Dynastic Period held that the aboriginal home of the Egyptians was Punt...". James Breasted in 1906 argued that the term Ta netjer was not only applied to Punt, located southeast of Egypt, but also to regions of Asia east and northeast of Egypt, such as Lebanon, which was the source of wood for temples.

On the murals of the Hatshepsut temple at Deir el-Bahri, the King and Queen of Punt are depicted along with their retinue. Due to her unusual appearance, the Queen was sometimes hypothesized to have had advanced steatopygia or elephantiasis.

According to Senegalese Egyptologist, Aboubacry Moussa Lam, the Egyptians considered the Land of Punt as being their ancestral homeland.

British archaeologist, Jacke Phillips, argued that the term "Ta Netjer" (God's Land) was applied to regions south and west of Egypt, which included not only Punt but other regions entitled "Irem" and "Am(am)", with the latter regions accessible through Punt and Nubia. Phillips further argued that Irem was most likely the same location accessed by Harkhuf through his expeditions into inner Africa during the Old Kingdom period.

Africana professor, Aaron Kamugisha, reviewed the historiography and cultural debates concerning the ethnic status of the Ancient Egyptian population in 2003. He was critical of Kathryn Bard's views that Ancient Egyptians were a "Mediterranean peoples" and could not be classified as Sub-Saharan Blacks. In particular, he argued her views lacked wholesale consistency as she later stated that Egyptian artistic representations which depicted of Ancient Puntites' facial features looked more Egyptian than "black". In Kamguisha's view, this overlooked the fact that Punt is now generally regarded to be located in Somalia.

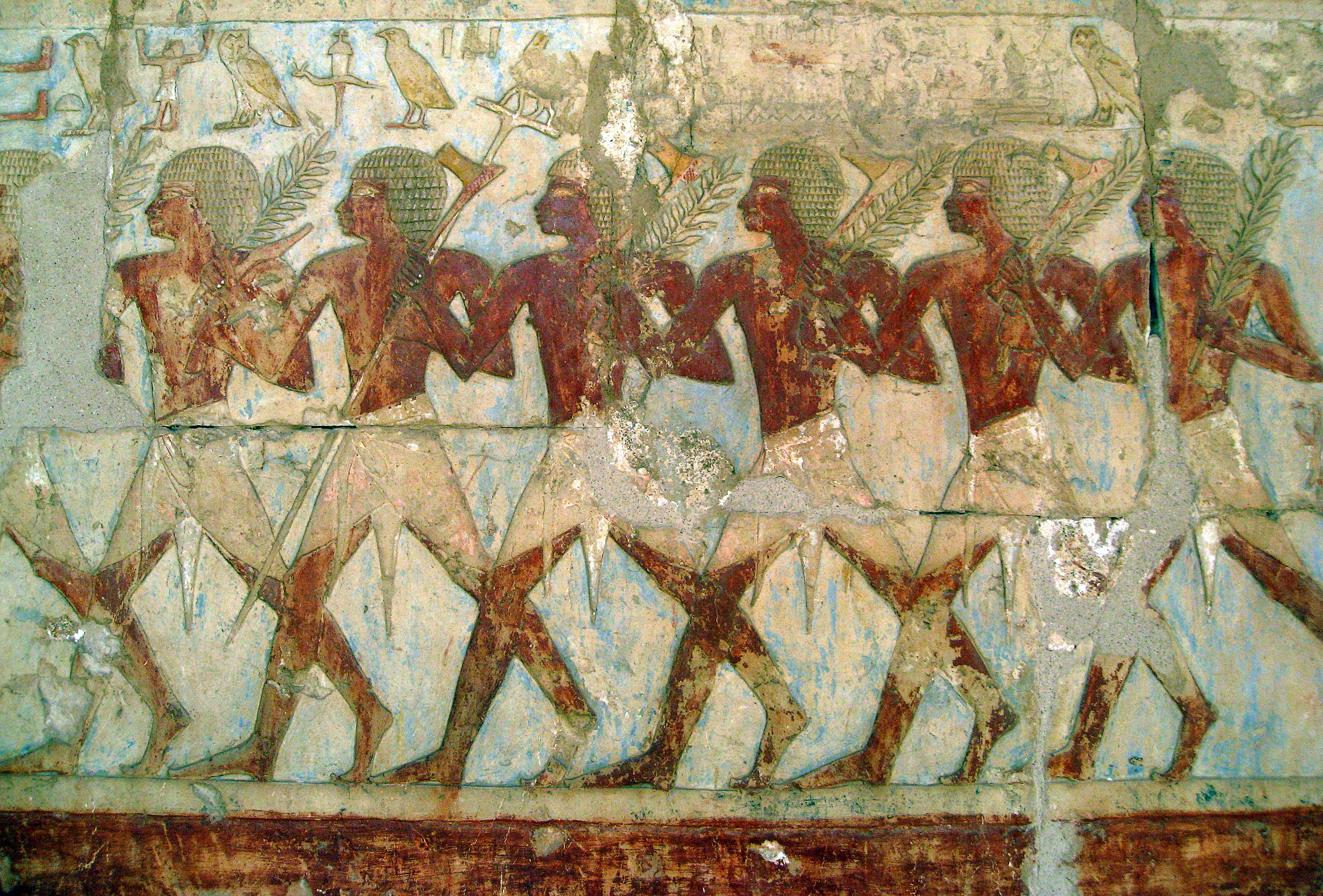
Egyptian soldiers bear tree branches and axes from a trading expedition to the Land of Punt

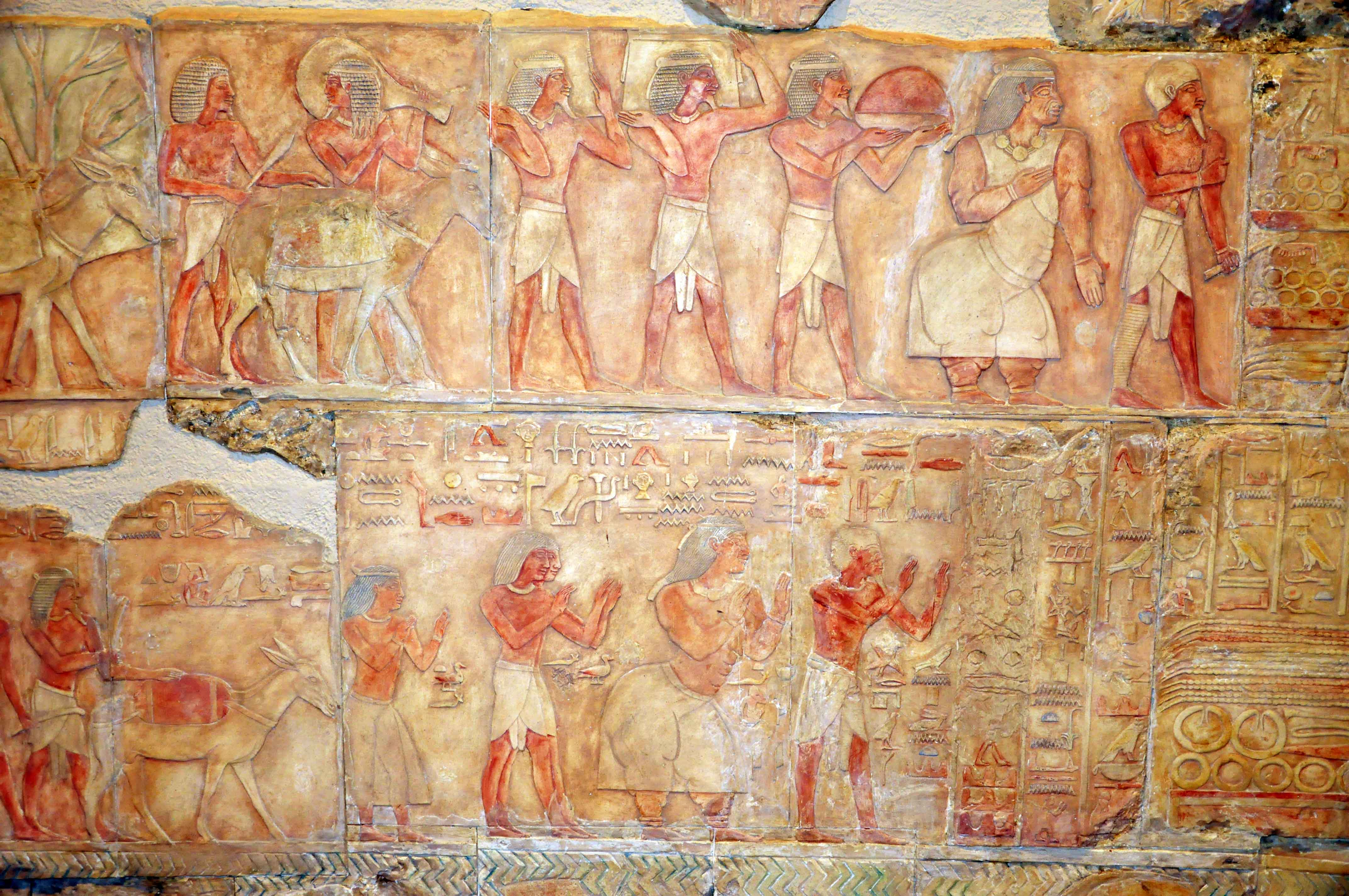
Puntites including their Queen, bearing tributes, represented in the classic reddish-brown colouring as Egyptians

In 2006, Tanzanian archaeologist, Felix Chami, had drawn on established scholarly interpretations of Egyptologists, Jean Leclant, Timothy Kendall and Kenneth Kitchen, in reaching the view:

"The most interesting part of the Egyptian knowledge about Sub-Saharan Africa is in relation to Punt and God's Land, or the lands of the gods. These lands had traded with Egypt since 2500 BC or even before. The Egyptians are not known to have had any war with the people of Punt, probably due to the fact that the land was not near enough to wage wars of conquest (kitchen, 1999: 174). These were lands of semi-mythical "horizon dwellers". Egyptians also considered their gods or ancestors to have originated from these lands thought to be in eastern and southern Africa (Whicker, 1990) and hence "God's land" (Kitchen, 1993:592). The records of the last Millennium BC show that Osiris and Isis, the most powerful Egyptian god and goddess, were "Ethiopians"/Black originating from countries in the south of Africa (Leclant, 1997: 157; Kendall, 1997: 171; Waterfield, 1967)."

UNESCO scholar, Alan Anselin, observed that a conclusive view on the relations between Egypt and Punt remain tentative until further textual and archaeological evidence can confirm the full nature of their historical connections. Tanzanian archaeologist, Felix A. Chami also maintained that cultural relationship between Egypt and Punt along with its precise location in Eastern Africa still remained an ongoing area of scholarly debate. Chami noted that Punt was referred to as "God's Land" from which Egyptian religious deities, Osiris and Isis were described to originate in the land of the south, yet observed that Egyptian trading missions had historically been perceived to trigger cultural diffusion and domestication throughout wider Africa.

== Proposed locations ==
=== Horn of Africa ===
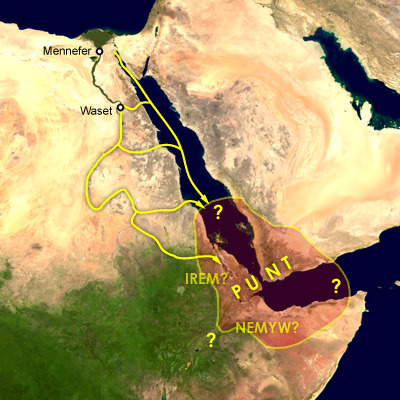
Supposed location around the Red Sea and major travel routes by land and sea

The majority opinion places Punt in the Horn of Africa, based on the fact that the products of Punt (as depicted in the Hatshepsut illustrations) were abundantly found in the Horn of Africa but were less common or sometimes absent in Arabia. These products included gold and aromatic resins such as myrrh, frankincense, and ebony; the wild animals depicted in Punt included giraffes, baboons, hippopotami, and leopards. Richard Pankhurst states: "[Punt] has been identified with territory on both the Arabian and the Horn of Africa coasts. Consideration of the articles that the Egyptians obtained from Punt, notably gold and ivory, suggests, however, that these were primarily of African origin. ... This leads us to suppose that the term Punt probably applied more to African than Arabian territory."

In 1996, archaeologist Jacke Phillips, argued that textual records strongly suggested the location of Punt in a general area within the eastern coastal regions of modern Sudan, Somalia, Eritrea and northern Ethiopia.

In 2003, Ian Shaw wrote that "There is still some debate regarding the precise location of Punt, which was once identified with the region of modern Somalia. A strong argument has now been made for its location in either southern Sudan or the Eritrean region of Ethiopia, where the indigenous plants and animals equate most closely with those depicted in the Egyptian reliefs and paintings".

According to Simon Najovits, the area comprising Somalia, Djibouti, the Red Sea coast of Eritrea and Sudan in the Horn of Africa is considered the most likely location.

In 2010, researchers from the University of California, Santa Cruz analyzed hair from two mummified baboons using oxygen isotope analysis and were able to work out where they originated. The researchers compared the oxygen isotope samples in the ancient baboons to those found in their modern-day brethren. The isotope samples in baboons in Somalia and Yemen did not match, but those in Eritrea and eastern Ethiopia did match. The research team concluded that Punt was most likely a circumscribed region that included eastern Ethiopia and all of Eritrea.

In June 2018, Polish archaeologists who have been conducting research in The Temple of Hatshepsut since 1961 discovered the only depiction of a secretary bird (Sagittarius serpentarius) known from ancient Egypt in the Bas-reliefs from the Portico of Punt that depicted the great Pharaonic expedition to the Land of Punt.

In December 2020, primatologists from Dartmouth College examined tissues from mummified baboons recovered from New Kingdom and Ptolemaic sites in Egypt that were believed to have come from Punt. The study revealed that the mummified baboons were all born outside of Egypt and were hamadryas baboons. The hamadryas baboon is a species of baboon native to the Horn of Africa and the southwestern tip of the Arabian Peninsula. The strontium ratio in the tooth enamel confirmed that the baboons were born in an area stretching across present day Eritrea, Ethiopia and north western Somalia.

It has been suggested that Punt might be located in eastern Sudan and western Eritrea where the Gash Group (about 3000 to 1800 BC) and later the Jebel Mokram Group flourished. Especially at Gash Group sites, many Egyptian pottery vessels and Egyptian faience beads were found, indicating close contacts with Egypt. Found Red Sea shells demonstrate contact with the Red Sea coast.

A news website in 2023 published evidence that DNA taken from mummified baboons may have shown where Punt was in Eritrea. A primarily German team of researchers published the results of extracting mitochondrial DNA from a mummified baboon. By comparing that with mitochondrial DNA extracted from 14 museum specimen baboons from the 19th and 20th centuries with known provenances, they concluded that the mummified baboon came from modern-day Eritrea. As the mummified baboon dates from a period when Egypt was trading with Punt, it may be assumed to come from there, and the authors suggested (but were unable to prove) that Punt is likely to be the same as the later-classical port city of Adulis.

=== Arabian peninsula ===
Dimitri Meeks disagrees with the Horn of Africa hypothesis and points to ancient inscriptions that locate Punt in the western coast of the Arabian Peninsula, from the Gulf of Aqaba to Yemen, he has written that "Texts locating Punt beyond doubt to the south are in the minority, but they are the only ones cited in the current consensus about the location of the country. Punt, we are told by the Egyptians, is situated – in relation to the Nile Valley – both to the north, in contact with the countries of the Near East of the Mediterranean area, and also to the east or south-east, while its furthest borders are far away to the south. Only the Arabian Peninsula satisfies all these indications."

=== Others ===
Some scholars have argued that Punt is the early Pandyan island of Tamraparni, present day Sri Lanka. An artifact datable to the Fifth Dynasty was originally stated to be made from Diospyros ebenum wood, a tree which is originally of Southern India and Sri Lanka. However, such identification is now considered unconfirmed because of the unlikelihood of such an early contact between Egypt and the Indian subcontinent, together with the difficulty of correctly identifying a plant specimen dead for thousands of years.

== Punt as depicted by Ancient Egypt ==
Queen Ati and King Perahu of Punt and their Attendants as depicted on Pharaoh Hatshepsut's temple at Deir el-Bahri	Men from Punt carrying Gifts, Tomb of Rekhmire

p wn n t xAst p-wn-n-t; Egyptian spelling "pwenet" the second "n" is a phonetic complement to "wen" and is not spoken the last sign is the determinative for country, land	Wall relief	Huts as in relief

== See also ==
- Aethiopia, a classical geographical term which was applied to parts of Sub-Saharan Africa which included Sudan and Ethiopia
- Ophir, an unidentified place mentioned in the Hebrew Bible as a source of riches for Solomon's Temple
- Tarshish, another unidentified place mentioned in the Bible
- Yam (Nubia) - another north eastern African kingdom, assumed to be situated in Upper Nubia, Sudan.
