= Sudanese Communist Party =

Political party in Sudan

Sudanese Communist Party الحزب الشيوعي السوداني
- General Secretary: Muhammad Mukhtar al-Khatib
- Founded: 1946; 80 years ago
- Headquarters: Khartoum
- Newspaper: Al-Midan
- Youth wing: Sudanese Youth Union
- Ideology: Communism; Marxism–Leninism
- Political position: Far-left
- National affiliation: Anti-Imperialist Front (1952–1958); National Consensus Forces (since 2010)
- International affiliation: IMCWP
- Colours: Red
- Transitional Legislative Council: 0 / 300

Party flag
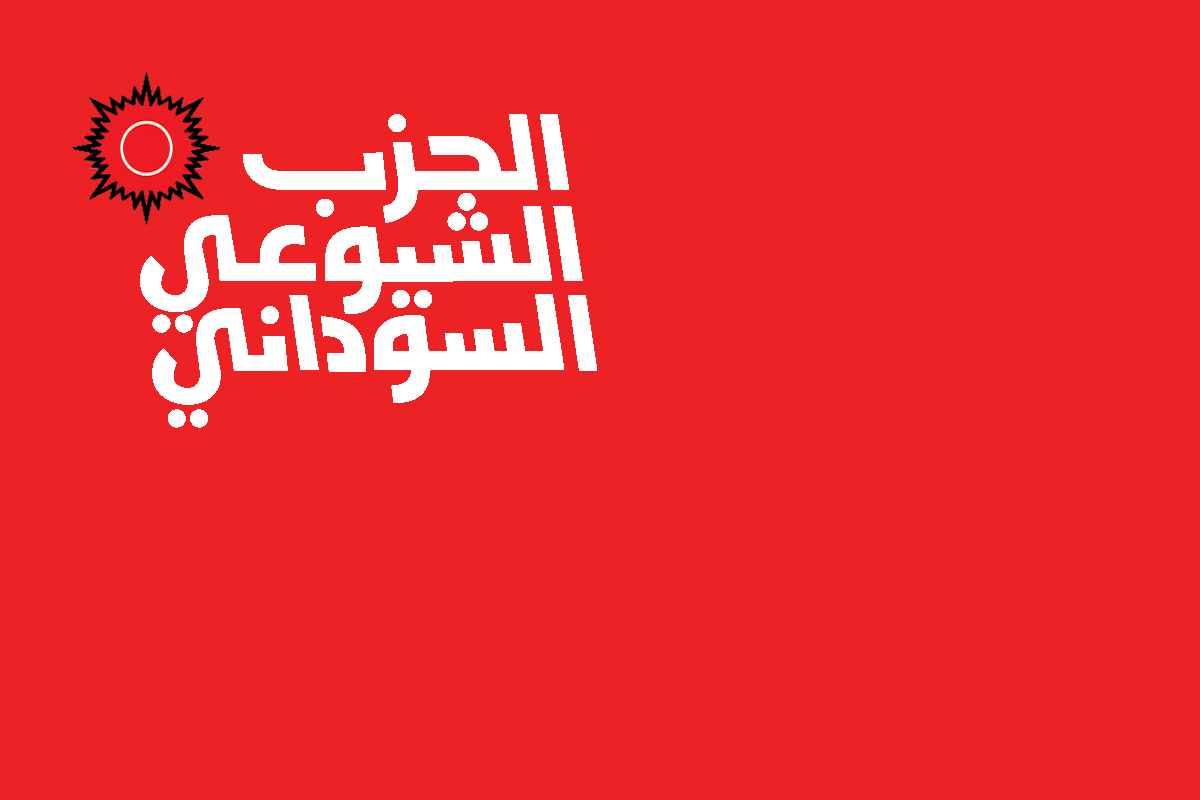

The Sudanese Communist Party (abbr. SCP; Arabic: الحزب الشيوعي السوداني, romanized: al-Ḥizb al-Shuyūʿī al-Sūdānī) is a Marxist-Leninist party in Sudan. Founded in 1946, it was a major force in Sudanese politics in the early post-independence years, and was one of the two most influential communist parties in the Arab world, the other being the Iraqi Communist Party.

The party helped overthrow the military government of Ibrahim Abboud in the October 1964 Revolution and joined the subsequent transitional government. Anti-communists in the post-revolution government attempted to outlaw the party but were unsuccessful; the SCP contested two parliamentary elections in the 1960s.

In 1971, President Gaafar Nimeiry launched a wave of repression against the party after a failed coup implicated the involvement of a number of communist military officers. The party's most prominent figures – Abdel Khaliq Mahjub, Joseph Garang, Alshafi Ahmed Elshikh, Babkir Elnour and Hashem al Atta – were executed, and the party was officially banned. The party resurfaced after Nimeiry was overthrown in 1985.

The SCP opposed army colonel Omar al-Bashir's 1989 coup and his subsequent 25-year-long tenure as Sudan's head of state. The party is opposed to Abdel Fattah al-Burhan's Transitional Military Council and the measures enacted after the 2019 coup.

== History ==
=== Foundation and growth ===
The Sudanese Movement for National Liberation (also known by its Arabic acronym HASTU) was founded in 1946, through the merger of two Sudanese communist groups– the Omdurman group belonging to Henri Curiel's Egyptian Movement for National Liberation and a group in Khartoum which had been organized by Herbert Storey, a British soldier and member of the Communist Party of Great Britain. During the 1940s and 1950s the party became popular amongst students, and it helped establish the Students' Congress in 1949. The party originally worked largely through different front organisations such as the Anti-Imperialist Front, through which it contested the 1953 parliamentary election. At the third conference of the Sudanese Movement for National Liberation, held in February 1956, the party changed its name to the Sudanese Communist Party. A hundred party members attended the conference, which elected a 31-member central committee.

The party joined other groups in opposition to the military government of Ibrahim Abboud, and played a key role in toppling the government in the October 1964 Revolution, joining the subsequent transitional government.

The party contested two elections in the 1960s and came into conflict with the Umma Party and National Unionist Party-led government. Nevertheless, the party went on to win 8 seats in the 1965 election, with Ahmad Sulayman being elected from a territorial constituency, and Abdel Khaliq Mahjub being elected as an independent. Another member of the party, Fatima Ahmed Ibrahim, was the first woman elected to the Sudanese parliament.

The Sino-Soviet split caused a split within the party which lasted from late 1964 to early 1965. Pro-Chinese members were either expelled or chose to leave voluntarily to form the Sudanese Communist Party– Revolutionary Leadership.

From 1965 to 1967, a number of parties attempted to outlaw the SCP from partaking in parliamentary elections. Some members advocated the establishment of an ideologically broader Socialist Party of the Sudan, which lasted from 1967 to 1969. Other members advocated operating underground.

=== Nimeiry government and 1971 coup ===
The military overthrew the Sudanese government on 25 May 1969 in a coup d'état led by Gaafar Nimeiry. The SCP gained influence in the new administration, and SCP policies, such as those pertaining to regional autonomy for the south, were adopted by the Nimeiry government. Joseph Garang, an SCP member, was made the Government Minister of Southern Affairs. The SCP was supportive of negotiations which led to the Addis Ababa Agreement of 1972.

On 19 July 1971, a group of army officers led by Major Hashem al-Atta launched a coup d'état against the Nimeiry government. However, Nimeiry loyalists retook the capital Khartoum three days later, freed Nimeiry, and restored his government. As many of the conspirators were members of the SCP, Nimeiry blamed the party for the coup and executed several of its leaders, including Mahjub and Garang.

The failed coup had its roots in historical ideological differences within the party, between the pro-Soviet faction and the nationalist faction. The nationalists, such as Ahmad Sulayman and Farouk Abu Issa, wished to cooperate with the Nimeiry government. The pro-Soviet faction, led by Mahjub, was less supportive and opposed the 1969 coup by Nimeiry.

=== Post-Nimeiry ===
On 6 April 1985, Abdel Rahman Swar al-Dahab launched a coup d'état and overthrew Nimeiry. In this new climate the SCP, now led by Muhammad Ibrahim Nugud, resumed its former above-ground activities and took part in the 1986 election, winning 3 seats, and returning Fatima Ahmed Ibrahim to the National Assembly.

Following the 1989 Sudanese coup d'état, however, the SCP was again repressed, with the party being banned and its leaders being arrested.

=== Recent developments ===
In a 2007 interview, then general secretary of the SCP Muhammad Ibrahim Nugud claimed that the party enjoyed support from a wide section of Sudanese society, including "workers, farmers, students, women's groups, minority groups, in the Nuba Mountains, in the south, and in Darfur". Human rights activist Suleman Hamid El Haj was most recently the assistant secretary and spokesman for the party. After the independence of South Sudan in 2011, the southern branch of the party split to form the Communist Party of South Sudan.

In 2008, the SCP and the South African Communist Party jointly launched the African Left Network to facilitate greater cooperation amongst African communist parties.

Nugud died in London, the United Kingdom, on 22 March 2012. By then he had served as the party's general secretary for over four decades. He was succeeded by Muhammad Mukhtar al-Khatib.

The party participated in the 2018–2019 Sudanese protests and demonstrated against the measures enacted by the Transitional Military Council in the aftermath of the 2019 coup d'état. In May 2022, the Sudanese Armed Forces arrested several prominent party members, including al-Khatib.

With the outbreak of the Sudanese civil war (2023–present) in April 2023, the SCP called for an immediate ceasefire. The Rapid Support Forces subsequently raided and occupied the SCP's headquarters in Khartoum on 25 May 2023. Operating under a Marxist framework, the SCP analyzed the conflict not as a mere military anomaly, but as a violent collision between two factions of a "parasitic and comprador capitalist class" mobilizing to secure state resources for predatory elites and foreign powers.

In 2025, the party issued strong institutional condemnations against the warring factions' attempts to establish parallel governments. The SCP rejected both the Sudanese Armed Forces' administration in Port Sudan and the RSF's political maneuvers in Nairobi, arguing that dual governments would permanently fracture Sudan's sovereignty. Maintaining a strict anti-war stance, the party joined the civilian anti-war coalition "Somoud" (Steadfastness) and participated in diplomatic transition efforts led by the African Union in late 2025.

== Ideology ==
=== Historical ===
Following its founding in 1946, the party was noted for its highly progressive policies and positions. Until the 1960s, it was the only party in Sudan which allowed women to join. It was also the only party which advocated autonomy for South Sudan and integrated political figures from the south into its leadership. Aiming to achieve "racial harmony" in Sudan, one of the SCP's programmatic goals was to undo the continuing imbalance in wages between Arab Northerners and black Southerners.

During the Cold War the party developed two main factions, an Orthodox Marxist–Leninist and pro-Soviet faction led by Abdel Khaliq Mahjub, and a nationalist faction led by Ahmad Sulayman and Farouk Abu Issa, which emphasized a more localized Sudanese interpretation of Marxism. The party tried to pair the struggle for socialism with a broader struggle for democracy.

The party subsequently supported the policies and positions of the Sudan People's Liberation Movement (SPLM) in the early 1990s.

=== Current ===
The SCP advocates a return to democratic rule in Sudan and opposed the secession of southern Sudan. The freer political climate following the signing of the Comprehensive Peace Agreement has allowed the party to be more active in the country. Party leader Muhammad Ibrahim Nugud came out of two decades of hiding in 2008. Party members suffering during the decades of NIF rule had pleaded with him to be more active but Nugud feared arrest. Nugud visited Juba on 28 November 2008 at the invitation of southern Sudanese communists. The trip was aimed at "bolstering the activities of the SCP in southern Sudan". He was received by SPLM Deputy Secretary General Ann Itto.

Nugud died in London in March 2012, when he was about 80 years old. He was succeeded as General Secretary by Muhammad Mukhtar al-Khatib.

== Party leaders ==
=== General Secretary ===
- Abdel Khaliq Mahjub (February 1949– 28 July 1971)
- Muhammad Ibrahim Nugud (c. July 1971– 22 March 2012)
- Muhammad Mukhtar al-Khatib (c. March 2012– present)

== Election results ==
Results of Sudanese parliamentary elections contested
Year	%	Seats
1953 (Note: The party did not register with authorities prior to the 1953 election and ran candidates under a legal umbrella organisation, the Anti-Imperialist Front.)	[?]	1 / 97
1965	[?]	8 / 207
1968	0.1	0 / 218
1986	1.7	3 / 260

== See also ==
- Egyptian Communist Party
- Communist Party of South Sudan
- Thuraya al-Tuhamy – Sudanese women's rights activist (1948–2020)
- Issam Othman
