= Elections in Sudan =

In typical elections, Sudan elects on a national level head of state – the president – and a legislature. In the election of 2010, there were two presidential elections, one for the Presidency of the Republic of Sudan and one for the Presidency of the Government of Southern Sudan. Elections for the National Assembly were last held in 2015.

The National Legislature whose members were chosen in mid-2005 had two chambers. The National Assembly (Majlis Watani) had 426 members who represented the government, former rebels, and other opposition political parties. The Council of States (Majlis Welayat) had 32 members who were indirectly elected by state legislatures. All members of the National Legislature served five-year terms.

In the early twenty-first century, Sudan was a dominant-party state with the National Congress Party in power. Opposition parties were allowed, but were widely considered to have no real chance of gaining power.

On 11 April 2019, Sudan was taken over by a military junta after the military seized power from the President in a coup. Federal elections were tentatively scheduled for 2023 under the 2019 Sudanese transition to democracy deal. However, since 15 April 2023, plans for an election have been stalled due to the ongoing civil war.

== Latest elections ==
=== President ===
Turnout by state.

Candidate	Party	Votes	%
Omar al-Bashir	National Congress Party	5,252,478	94.05
Fadl el-Sayed Shuaib	Federal Truth Party	79,779	1.43
Fatima Abdel Mahmoud	Sudanese Socialist Democratic Union	47,653	0.85
Mohamed Elhassan Mohamed	National Reform Party	42,399	0.76
Abdul Mahmoud Abdul Jabar Rahamtalla	Union of the Nation's Forces	41,134	0.74
Hamdi Hassan Ahmed	Independent	18,043	0.32
Mohamed Ahmed Abdul Gadir Al Arbab	Independent	16,966	0.30
Yasser Yahiya Salih Abdul Gadir	Independent	16,609	0.30
Khairi Bakhit	Independent	11,852	0.21
Adel Dafalla Jabir	Independent	9,435	0.17
Mohamed Awad Al Barow	Independent	9,388	0.17
Asad Al Nil Adel Yassin Al Saafi	Independent	9,359	0.17
Alam Al Huda Ahmed Osman Mohamed Ali	Independent	8,133	0.15
Ahmed Al Radhi Jadalla Salem	Independent	7,751	0.14
Isaam Al Ghali Tajj Eddin Ali	Independent	7,587	0.14
Omar Awad Al Karim Hussein Ali	Independent	6,297	0.11
Total		5,584,863	100.00
Valid votes		5,584,863	91.68
Invalid/blank votes		506,549	8.32
Total votes		6,091,412	100.00
Registered voters/turnout		13,126,989	46.40
Source: NEC

=== National Assembly ===
Party	Proportional			Women			Constituency			Total seats	+/–
Party	Votes	%	Seats	Votes	%	Seats	Votes	%	Seats	Total seats	+/–
National Congress Party	3,915,590	78.32	67	4,321,901	83.37	107			149	323	–1
Democratic Unionist Party–Original	218,120	4.36	4	249,768	4.82	6			15	25	+24
Umma Collective Leadership	214,531	4.29	4						2	6	+5
Democratic Unionist Party	114,806	2.30	2	137,265	2.65	3			10	15	+11
Federal Umma Party	79,292	1.59	1	107,102	2.07	3			3	7	+4
Freedom and Justice Party	60,373	1.21	1	36,899	0.71	1			1	3	–
United Umma Party	49,923	1.00	1	63,770	1.23	2			1	4	–
Umma Reform and Development Party	35,309	0.71	1	45,199	0.87	1			3	5	–
National Umma Party	30,966	0.62	1						2	3	+2
Federal Truth Party	30,254	0.61	1	33,046	0.64	1			0	2	–
National Bond Party	30,079	0.60	1	43,199	0.83	1			0	2	–
National Freedom and Justice Party	29,642	0.59	1						3	4	–
Constitution Party	27,466	0.55	0	39,783	0.77	1			0	1	–
Movement for Justice and Equality	26,723	0.53	0	18,493	0.36	0			0	0	–
National Reform Party	25,990	0.52	0	30,107	0.58	1			0	1	–
Popular Forces for Rights and Democracy Movement	23,089	0.46	0	27,260	0.53	1			0	1	–
Justice Party	18,196	0.36	0						0	0	–
National Movement for Peace and Development	17,231	0.34	0	14,732	0.28	0			0	0	–
Sudanese Socialist Democratic Union	16,508	0.33	0						0	0	–
People's Movement Party	14,018	0.28	0	15,595	0.30	0			1	1	–
Sudanese National Front Party	12,740	0.25	0						0	0	–
Sudanese Socialist Union Party al-Maywa	8,686	0.17	0						0	0	–
Centre Party for Justice and Development									1	1	–
General Federation of North and South Funj									1	1	–
Ana al-Sudan									1	1	–
Black Free									1	1	–
Independents									19	19	+16
Total	4,999,532	100.00	85	5,184,119	100.00	128			213	426	–24
Registered voters/turnout	13,126,989	–		13,126,989	–		13,126,989	–			
Source: NEC

== History ==
- 1948 Sudanese parliamentary election
- 1953 Sudanese parliamentary election
- 1958 Sudanese parliamentary election
- 1965 Sudanese parliamentary election
- 1968 Sudanese parliamentary election
- 1978 Sudanese parliamentary election
- 1980 Sudanese parliamentary election
- 1981–82 Sudanese parliamentary election
- 1986 Sudanese parliamentary election
- 1996 Sudanese general election
- 2000 Sudanese general election
- 2010 Southern Sudanese general election
- 2010 Sudanese general election
- 2010 Sudanese general election in Jonglei
- 2010 Sudanese gubernatorial elections
- 2015 Sudanese general election

== Next ==
- Next Sudanese general election

== Sudan National Elections Commission ==
Sudan has had national level elections since 1948 while it was still an Anglo–Egyptian colony. Independence from or union with Egypt was a major electoral platform in the 1948 election.

Following the Comprehensive Peace Agreement, elections initially did not play a role in determining the composition of the interim national government, the South Sudan government, or the state legislatures. An out of date national census and, in the case of South Sudan, a complete lack of infrastructure for conducting an election, rendered the electoral process moot. As a result, all government officials and all governing bodies consisted of appointed officials until the completion of a census in 2008 and national elections in 2010. The SPLM rejected the results of the census, claiming that it underestimated populations in the South. The National Elections Act of 2008 provided the legal framework for conducting elections in Sudan, South Sudan, and in each state. The National Elections Commission was responsible for developing the regulations, rules, and orders for the election of the national president, South Sudan president, state governors, National Assembly, South Sudan Legislative Assembly, and state assemblies.

== See also ==
- Democracy in Africa
- Electoral calendar
- Electoral system
