= Vice President of Sudan =

Deputy head of state of the Republic of Sudan

Vice President of the Republic of the Sudan
- نائب رئيس جمهورية السودان (Arabic)
- Emblem of Sudan

- Flag of Sudan

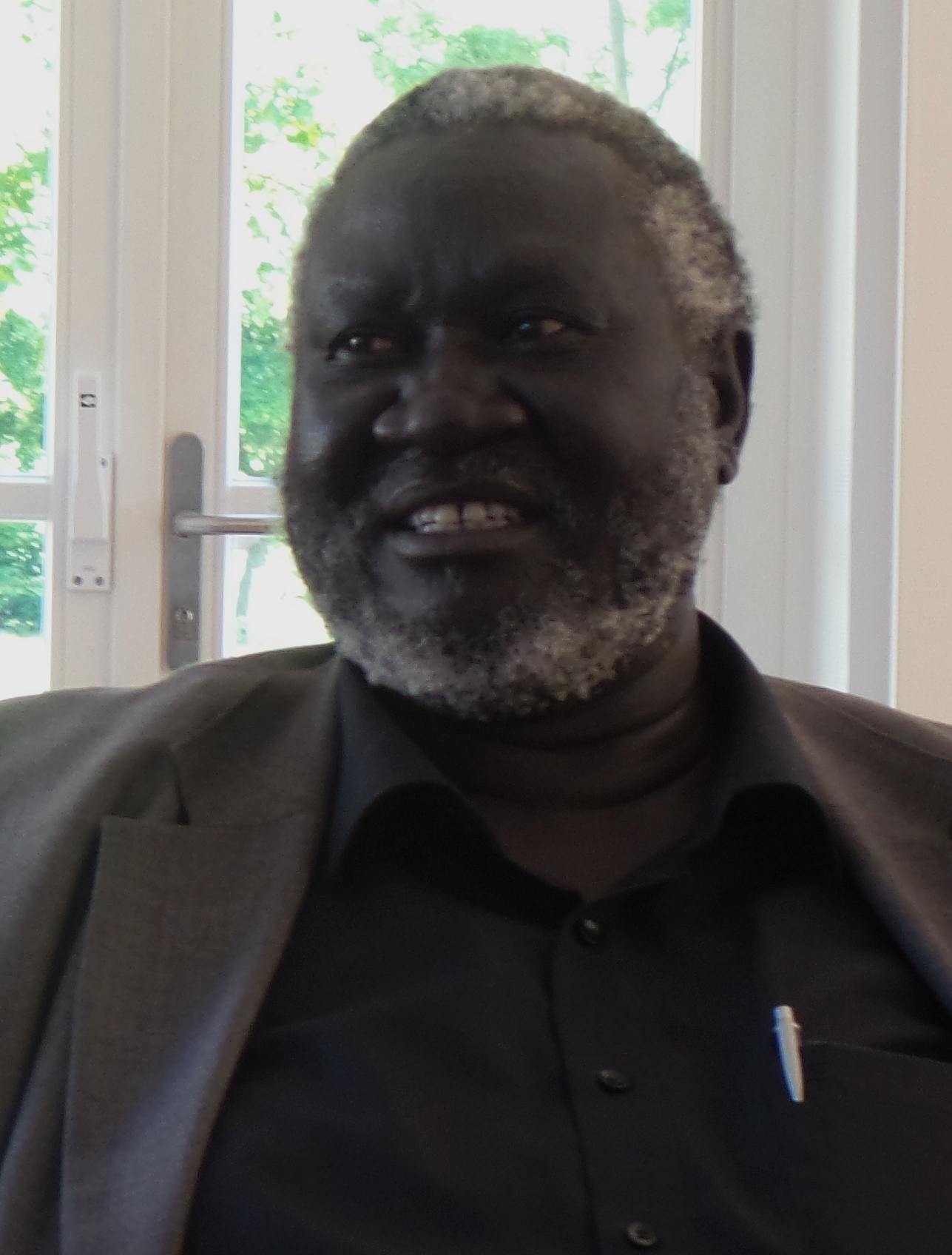
- Incumbent; Malik Agar; As Vice-President of the Transitional Sovereignty Council since 19 May 2023
- Member of: Transitional Sovereignty Council
- Residence: Khartoum
- Appointer: President of the Transitional Sovereignty Council; Abdel Fattah al-Burhan
- Term length: 3 years and 3 months
- Formation: May 1969 (First Vice President)
- First holder: Babiker Awadalla (First Vice President)

The vice president of Sudan is the second highest political position obtainable in Sudan. Currently there is a provision for one de facto vice president, deputy chairman of the Transitional Sovereignty Council, who is appointed by the chairman of the council. Historically (in the 1972–1983 and 2005–2011 periods) either the first or the second vice president was from Southern Sudan (now independent South Sudan). From 2011 until the abolition of the post in 2019, the second vice president was from Darfur.

== Vice presidents ==
=== First vice presidents ===
Title	Portrait	Name	Term of office			Political affiliation	Representing	President	Refs
Title	Portrait	Name	Took office	Left office	Time in office	Political affiliation	Representing	President	Refs
Deputy Chairman of the NRCC		Babiker Awadalla	May 1969	1971	2 years	Independent		Gaafar Nimeiry	
Vice President		Abel Alier	1971	1972	1 year	SF	Southern Sudan	Gaafar Nimeiry	
First Vice President		Major Gen. Mohamed al-Baghir Ahmed	1972	1976	4 years	Military / SSU		Gaafar Nimeiry	
First Vice President		Major; Abu el-Qassim Mohamad Ibrahim	1976	1979	3 years	Military / SSU		Gaafar Nimeiry	
First Vice President		Lt. General; Abdul Majid Khalil	June 1979	25 January 1982	2 years, 7 months	Military / SSU		Gaafar Nimeiry	
First Vice President		Major Gen. Omar Muhammad al-Tayib (Note: Also Head of the State Security Organization.)	January 1982	April 1985	3 years, 2 months	Military / SSU		Gaafar Nimeiry	
Deputy Chairman of the Transitional Military Council		Lt. General; Taj el-Deen Abdallah Fadl	April 1985	May 1986	1 year, 1 month	Military		Abdel Rahman Swar al-Dahab	
Deputy Chairman of the Supreme Council		Abd al-Rahman Saeed	1986	1989	3 years			Ahmed al-Mirghani	
Deputy Chairman of the RCCNS		Major Gen. Zubair Mohamed Salih	9 July 1989	October 1993	8 years, 218 days	Military / NCP		Omar al-Bashir	
Vice President		Major Gen. Zubair Mohamed Salih	October 1993	February 1994	8 years, 218 days	Military / NCP		Omar al-Bashir	
First Vice President		Major Gen. Zubair Mohamed Salih	February 1994	12 February 1998 (Note: Died in an air crash.)	8 years, 218 days	Military / NCP		Omar al-Bashir	
First Vice President		Ali Osman Taha	17 February 1998	9 January 2005	6 years, 327 days	NCP		Omar al-Bashir	
First Vice President		John Garang	9 January 2005	30 July 2005 (Note: Died in office.)	202 days	SPLM	Southern Sudan	Omar al-Bashir	
First Vice President		Salva Kiir	11 August 2005	9 July 2011 (Note: Left position when South Sudan became independent.)	5 years, 332 days	SPLM	Southern Sudan	Omar al-Bashir	
First Vice President		Ali Osman Taha	13 September 2011	6 December 2013	2 years, 84 days	NCP		Omar al-Bashir	
First Vice President		Bakri Hassan Saleh (Note: Also served as Prime Minister of Sudan from March 2017 to October 2018.)	7 December 2013	23 February 2019	5 years, 78 days	NCP		Omar al-Bashir	
First Vice President		Lt. General; Ahmed Awad Ibn Auf	23 February 2019	11 April 2019	47 days	Military / NCP		Omar al-Bashir	
Deputy Chairman of the Transitional Military Council		Lt. General; Kamal Abdel-Marouf al-Mahi	11 April 2019	13 April 2019	2 days	Military		Ahmed Awad Ibn Auf	
Deputy Chairman of the Transitional Military Council		Lt. General; Mohamed Hamdan Dagalo	13 April 2019	20 August 2019	4 years, 36 days	Military		Abdel Fattah al-Burhan	
Deputy Chairman of the Transitional Sovereignty Council		Lt. General; Mohamed Hamdan Dagalo	21 August 2019	25 October 2021	4 years, 36 days	Military		Abdel Fattah al-Burhan	
Deputy Chairman of the Transitional Sovereignty Council		Lt. General; Mohamed Hamdan Dagalo	11 November 2021	19 May 2023	4 years, 36 days	Military		Abdel Fattah al-Burhan	
Deputy Chairman of the Transitional Sovereignty Council		Malik Agar	19 May 2023	Incumbent	3 years, 174 days	SPLM–N (Agar)		Abdel Fattah al-Burhan	

=== Second vice presidents ===
Title	Portrait	Name	Term of office			Political affiliation	Representing	President	Refs
Title	Portrait	Name	Took office	Left office	Time in office	Political affiliation	Representing	President	Refs
Deputy Chairman of the NRCC		Major Gen. Khalid Hassan Abbas	May 1969	1971	2 years	Military		Gaafar Nimeiry	
Second Vice President		Abel Alier	1972	1982	10 years	SF	Southern Sudan	Gaafar Nimeiry	
Second Vice President		Joseph Lagu	June 1982	April 1985	2 years, 10 months	SANU	Southern Sudan	Gaafar Nimeiry	
Second Vice President		George Kongor Arop	14 February 1994	14 October 2000	6 years, 243 days	NCP	Southern Sudan	Omar al-Bashir	
Second Vice President		Moses Kacoul Machar	12 February 2001	January 2005	3 years, 10 months		Southern Sudan	Omar al-Bashir	
Second Vice President		Ali Osman Taha	9 July 2005	13 September 2011	6 years, 66 days	NCP		Omar al-Bashir	
Second Vice President		Al-Haj Adam Youssef	13 September 2011	7 December 2013	2 years, 85 days	NCP	Darfur	Omar al-Bashir	
Second Vice President		Hassabu Mohamed Abdalrahman	7 December 2013	10 September 2018	4 years, 277 days	NCP	South Darfur	Omar al-Bashir	
Second Vice President		Osman Kebir	10 September 2018	11 April 2019	213 days	NCP	North Darfur	Omar al-Bashir	

=== Third vice presidents ===
Title	Portrait	Name	Term of office			Political affiliation	President	Refs
Title	Portrait	Name	Took office	Left office	Time in office	Political affiliation	President	Refs
Third Vice President		Rashid Bakr (Note: Also Prime Minister, possibly also Third Vice President in 1977–1979.)	11 August 1976	10 September 1977	1 year, 30 days	SSU	Gaafar Nimeiry	
Third Vice President		Major Gen. Omar Muhammad al-Tayib	1981	1982	1 year	Military / SSU	Gaafar Nimeiry	

== Assistants and advisors to the president ==
=== Senior assistants to the president ===
Title	Portrait	Name	Term of office			Political affiliation	Representing	President	Refs
Title	Portrait	Name	Took office	Left office	Time in office	Political affiliation	Representing	President	Refs
Senior Assistant to the President		Riek Machar	7 August 1997	31 January 2000	2 years, 177 days	SPLA-Nasir	Southern Sudan	Omar al-Bashir	
Senior Assistant to the President		Minni Minnawi	23 April 2007	6 December 2010	3 years, 227 days	SLM/A	Darfur	Omar al-Bashir	

=== Assistants to the president ===
- Nafii Ali Nafii Ahmed
- Musa Mohamed Ahmed; representing Eastern Sudan

=== Advisors to the president ===
- Shartai Jaafar Abdel Hakam (11 January 2012 – ????); representing West Darfur

== See also ==
- Politics of Sudan
- History of Sudan
- List of governors of pre-independence Sudan
- List of heads of state of Sudan
- List of heads of government of Sudan
