= Abdullah Fadl =

Sudanese soldier, politician (1935–2026)

Lieutenant general Taj el-Din Abdullah Fadl
- تاج الدين عبد الله فضل

First Vice President of Sudan
- In office April 1985 – May 1986
- President: Abdel Rahman Swar al-Dahab
- Preceded by: Omar al-Tayib
- Succeeded by: Abd al-Rahman Saeed

Personal details
- Born: January 1935
- Died: ca January 2026 Egypt

Military service
- Rank: Lieutenant General

Lieutenant General Taj el-Din Abdullah Fadl (1935-2026) was a Sudanese soldier and politician, and former Vice President of Sudan.

Fadl was born in January 1935. He graduated from Military College of Sudan in 1956. He had a military career and held the positions of chief of staff of the first army division, and commander of the artillery corps. He was lieutenant general of the Sudanese Armed Forces. In Sudanese politics, he was a member of the regular forces committee of the Sudanese Socialist Union. He was also deputy head of the State Security Organization.

After Nimeiri was ousted in the coup of Abdel Rahman Swar al-Dahab in April 1985, Fadl became Vice President of the Transitional Military Council. Al Dahab handed over the title of Commander of the Armed Forces to Fadl on 24 April 1986. Fadl stated that the Armed Forces has been harmed by its involvement in Sudanese politics. He was Commander-in-Chief of the Armed Forces from April 1986 to September 1986.

Fadl served his final years working for a humanitarian aid organization. He died in Egypt sometime before 3 January 2026.
