= Native Courts Ordinance =

1932 Sudanese law

The Native Courts Ordinance was a law in the Sudan, passed by the Anglo-Egyptian colonial authorities in 1932. The law conveyed judicial and political powers to government-recognized sheikhs in the northern areas of the country. The sheikhs were, through this law, charged with tax collection, overseeing infrastructure constructions and administering ‘native areas’ and given the authority to issue punishments upon the local population. Through this law, and the corresponding Chiefs Courts Ordinance for the southern parts of the Sudan, introduced what would be termed the ‘Native Administration’ by the British colonial system.

== Post-independence legacy ==
Following Sudan's independence in 1956, the Native Administration system established by the 1932 Ordinance was initially retained but faced growing criticism as a colonial relic that entrenched tribal divisions and hindered national unity.

In January 1971, President Gaafar Nimeiry's regime passed the People's Local Government Act, which formally abolished the Native Administration. Tribal chiefs and their relatives were excluded from local government roles, and the system was replaced with elected people's councils linked to the Sudanese Socialist Union. This created a governance vacuum in many rural areas, particularly in Darfur and Kordofan.

The system persisted informally in remote regions where state capacity was limited. It was partially revived in the 1980s (especially during the 1983–1985 famine) and more systematically in the 1990s under the National Islamic Front/National Congress Party government. New "Amirs" were appointed in some areas, and Native Administration structures were extended into IDP camps to extend central control and mobilize political support.

=== Role in contemporary conflicts and governance ===
Native Administration leaders continue to play practical roles in local dispute resolution, natural resource management, aid distribution, and conflict mediation, particularly in Darfur, Kordofan, and eastern Sudan. A 2021 study by researchers from the University of Zalingei (in collaboration with Tufts University) highlighted their ongoing importance in integrated natural resource management and community-level peacebuilding in Central Darfur, despite challenges of politicization and erosion of legitimacy.

During the Sudanese civil war (2023–present), Native Administration structures have been involved in local governance, ceasefire mediation attempts, and humanitarian efforts in areas with weak central authority. In North Darfur, for example, they have coordinated food, medicine, and shelter distribution in El Fasher and surrounding areas. However, the war has also led to the displacement and targeting of some traditional leaders, with accusations of co-option by warring parties on both sides.
