= Omar al-Tayib =

Sudanese soldier and politician (died 2023)

Lieutenant general Omar al-Tayib
- عمر الطيب

First Vice President of Sudan
- In office January 1982 – April 1985
- President: Jaafar Nimeiry
- Preceded by: Abdul Majid Khalil
- Succeeded by: Taj el-Deen Abdallah Fadl (as Deputy Chairman of the Transitional Military Council)

Personal details
- Born: 1933 Al-Zaydab, Anglo-Egyptian Sudan
- Died: July 2023 (aged 89–90) Cairo, Egypt

Military service
- Rank: Lieutenant General

Lieutenant General Omar Mohamed al-Tayib was a Sudanese soldier and politician.

Al-Tayib was born in 1933 in Al-Zaydab village in Northern Sudan. He was educated at the Military College of Sudan. He was eventually promoted as Lieutenant General of Sudanese Army.

During the Nimeiry era, al-Tayib was one of the Vice Presidents (1981–1982), and then First Vice President (1982–1985) and Nimeiry's powerful head of State Security Organization. Al-Tayib deputized Nimeiry when he was ill. Al-Tayib was also described to be a close friend of Abdul Majid Khalil.

Al-Tayib lost his political power when Nimeiry was ousted in April 1985. Al-Tayib was sentenced to 60 years in prison in 1986 in an allegedly politically motivated trial. He emigrated to Saudi-Arabia at that time, and returned to Sudan in 2000. He died in Cairo in July 2023.
