= Sudanese Revolution (disambiguation) =

Sudanese Revolution may refer to:

== Political revolutions in Sudan ==
- the Sudanese October 1964 Revolution that led to a major change of government under president Ibrahim Abboud
- the 1985 Sudanese Revolution that led to a coup d'état overthrowing president Gaafar Nimeiry
- the 2018/2019 Sudanese Revolution that led to a coup d'état overthrowing president Omar al-Bashir and a mixed civilian–military transitional government
