= Al-Jazuli Daf'allah =

Prime Minister of Sudan (1985–1986)

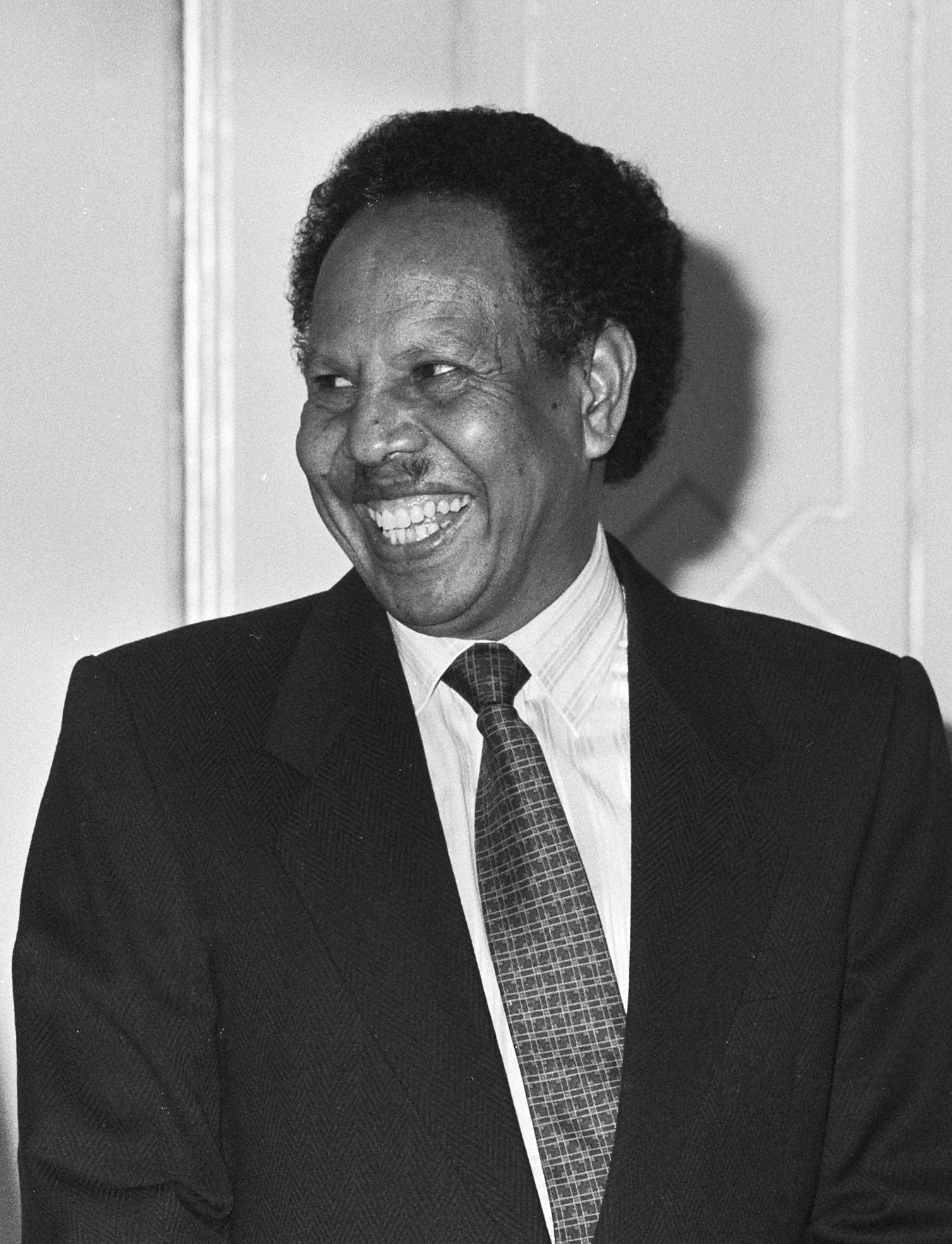
Al-Jazuli Daf'allah in 1985

Dr. Al-Jazuli Daf'allah (Arabic: الجزولي دفع الله; born December 1935) is a Sudanese politician who was the 10th Prime Minister of Sudan from April 22, 1985, to May 6, 1986. He graduated from Khartoum University medical faculty in 1959 and was head of the Sudanese Medical Association. After participating in the 1985 Sudanese coup d'état that deposed the government of Gaafar Nimeiry, he joined the military government of Abdel Rahman Swar al-Dahab as prime minister. He resigned the post after the 1986 Sudanese parliamentary election, and was succeeded by Sadiq al-Mahdi.
