= Ahmed Mohamed clock incident =

Arrest of 14-year-old for disassembled clock

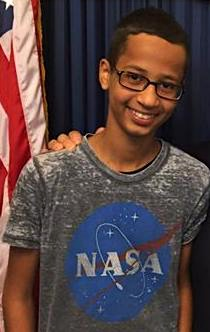
- Ahmed Mohamed, October 2015
- Date: September 14, 2015
- Venue: MacArthur High School
- Location: Irving, Texas, United States
- Outcome: Mohamed suspended from MacArthur High School for three days
- Arrests: 1
- Charges: None
- Litigation: Three lawsuits filed by Mohamed's family; all dismissed

On September 14, 2015, 14-year-old Ahmed Mohamed was arrested at MacArthur High School in Irving, Texas, for bringing a disassembled digital clock to school. The incident ignited allegations of racial profiling and Islamophobia from many media sources and commentators.

The episode arose when Mohamed reassembled the parts of a digital clock in an 8-inch (20 cm) pencil case and brought it to school to show his teachers. His English teacher thought the device resembled a bomb, confiscated it, and reported him to the principal. The local police were called, and they questioned him for an hour and a half. He was handcuffed, taken into custody and transported to a juvenile detention facility, where he was fingerprinted and his mug shot was taken. He was then released to his parents. According to local police, they arrested him because they initially suspected he may have purposely caused a bomb scare. The case was not pursued further by the juvenile justice authorities, but he was suspended from school.

Following the incident, the police determined Mohamed had no malicious intent, and he was not charged with any crime. News of the incident went viral – initially on Twitter – with allegations by commentators that the actions of the school officials and police were due to their stereotyping of Mohamed based on his Sudanese ancestry and Muslim faith. Afterwards, U.S. President Barack Obama as well as other politicians, activists, technology company executives, and media personalities commented about the incident. Many of them praised Mohamed for his ingenuity and creativity, and he was invited to participate in a number of high-profile events related to encouraging youth interest in science and technology. Although Mohamed was cleared of any criminal wrongdoing in the final police investigation, he became the subject of conspiracy theories – many of them contradictory, citing no evidence, and conflicting with established facts – which claimed that the incident was a deliberate hoax.

On November 23, 2015, Ahmed's family threatened to sue the City of Irving and the school district for civil rights violations and physical and mental anguish unless they received written apologies and compensation of $15 million. This lawsuit was dismissed in May 2017 for lack of evidence. The family also sued conservative talk show hosts Glenn Beck, Ben Shapiro, and another Fox News commentator for lesser amounts on the grounds of defamation of character. Both cases were dismissed with prejudice for First Amendment free speech reasons. In late 2015, his family decided to accept a scholarship from the Qatar Foundation and move to Qatar.

== Incident ==
=== Background ===
Photo taken by the Irving Police Department of the clock

At the time of the incident on Monday, September 14, 2015, Mohamed was fourteen years old and a high school freshman. In interviews with local media, Mohamed said that he wanted to show the engineering teacher at school what he had done over the weekend; he had taken apart a clock and rebuilt it inside a pencil case that resembled a small briefcase. His father, Mohamed Elhassan Mohamed, said that he had driven him to school that morning and encouraged him to show his technological skills.

In an interview on Al Jazeera's Ali Velshi on Target, Mohamed said the clock was "built from scrap around the house" and that "some of the boards were already manufactured". He told Larry Wilmore on The Nightly Show that it took him only "10 or 20 minutes" to put it together and that he had built more complicated items in the past but that the clock was simple, using some parts that were "scrapped off" so that it was easier. According to the initial report in The Dallas Morning News, he had done this "before bed on Sunday [September 13, 2015]".

Ralph Kubiak, Mohamed's seventh-grade history teacher, said that Mohamed was known as an electronics enthusiast with a history of being disciplined for using a handmade remote control to cause a classroom projector to malfunction on command. Mohamed was also noted for making a battery charger to help recharge the cellphone of a school tutor. The Dallas Morning News commented, "[s]ome of these creations looked much like the infamous clock – a mess of wires and exposed circuits stuffed inside a hinged case, perhaps suspicious to some." According to The Guardian, everybody in middle school knew Mohamed as "the kid who makes crazy contraptions" and who fixed electronics classmates brought to him, earning him the nickname "Inventor Kid".

According to the Dallas Morning News, Mohamed was suspended twice while in middle school, once for blowing soap bubbles in the bathroom and another time for defending himself during a fight in the hallway. During that time, Mohamed "was complaining of bullying – not just by students, but by staff", reportedly for being Muslim. After reviewing a letter of support from the same family friend and meeting with Mohamed, the school principal overturned that suspension.

=== Clock and arrest ===
Mohamed said he brought the clock to school because he "wanted to impress all of his teachers". His engineering teacher, upon seeing the clock said, "That's really nice", but advised him to keep the device in his backpack for the rest of the school day. Mohamed, however, later plugged it in during his English class and set a time on the clock. When the clock alarm started beeping, the English teacher requested to see it, and said, "Well, it looks like a bomb. Don't show it to anyone else." In an interview posted on KXAS-TV (NBC 5), Mohamed said he "closed it with a cable ... 'cause I didn't want to lock it to make it seem like a threat, so I just used a simple cable so it won't look that much suspicious."

After the English teacher confiscated the clock and reported him to the school principal's office, the police were called. The principal and a police officer then took him out of class and led him to a room where four other officers were waiting. Police indicated that he was interrogated only in order to clarify his intentions when he brought the clock to school. According to Mohamed, he was not allowed to contact his family during the questioning and he was threatened by the principal with expulsion unless he would sign a written statement. After interrogating him for about an hour and a half, he was taken out of the school in handcuffs and into police custody. Following his arrival at a juvenile detention center, Mohamed was fingerprinted, required to take a mug shot, and further questioned before being released to his parents.

Police determined that he had no malicious intent, and he was not charged with any crime. Irving Police Chief Larry Boyd said that "the officers pretty quickly determined that they weren't investigating an explosive device", and that Mohammed was arrested over the prospect that it was a "hoax bomb". Under Texas law, it is illegal to possess a "hoax bomb" with an intent to "make another believe that the hoax bomb is an explosive or incendiary device" or to "cause [an] alarm or reaction of any type by an official of a public safety agency or volunteer agency organized to deal with emergencies". After releasing Mohamed, police continued to question his clock's purpose, saying, "He kept maintaining it was a clock, but there was no broader explanation."

Some of Mohamed's teachers at Sam Houston Middle School were surprised to learn that staff at the high school called police, as they have known Mohamed to bring more elaborate devices to their school. His supporters have speculated that the questioning and subsequent transfer by police to a juvenile center exemplifies Islamophobia in the United States.

=== Suspension ===
Mohamed was suspended from school for three days. MacArthur High School's director of communications said he was welcome to return after his suspension.

=== Lawsuits ===
His family sent a demand letter on November 23, 2015, saying they would file a lawsuit if they did not receive $15 million in financial compensation and a public apology from the City of Irving and the Irving School District. He later withdrew from the school.

His family then filed a lawsuit against the City of Irving and the school district on August 8, 2016. The lawsuit alleged that officers racially profiled him and treated him differently on the basis of his race and ethnicity, starting with when “Yep, that’s who I thought it was,” with the implication being that they expected a student with a Muslim name to be the culprit. The lawsuit continued that the officers "pulled A.M. forcefully out of his chair, yanked his arms up behind his back so far that his right hand touched the back of his neck, causing a lot of pain". On May 19, 2017, a federal judge dismissed the lawsuit, saying the plaintiff presented no facts demonstrating intentional discrimination against Mohamed.

Mohamed Mohamed, on behalf of himself and Ahmed Mohamed, filed a defamation suit in Dallas County District Court on September 21, 2016. The named defendants were The Blaze, Inc, Glenn Beck, Center for Security Policy, Jim Hanson, Fox Television Stations, LLC, Ben Ferguson, Ben Shapiro, and Beth Van Duyne. Case No. DC-16-12579. The Mohameds were represented by Susan E. Hutchison of Hutchison & Stoy, PLLC.

A hearing was held on December 16, 2016, during which claims against the defendants KDFW Fox 4 and Ben Ferguson were dismissed with prejudice (meaning the suit could not be re-filed, though the decision could be appealed). In January 2017, the judge granted Hanson's and CSP's motion to dismiss (releasing TheBlaze, Glenn Beck, Jim Hanson and the Center for Security Policy), and in February 2017 the judge granted Shapiro's motion to dismiss. Legal fees were awarded to the defendants, and an appeal by Mohamed of the dismissals and legal fee awards was denied in 2018.

On March 13, 2018, a federal lawsuit filed by Ahmed Mohamed's father against the Irving Independent School District, the city of Irving, and several specific individuals, was dismissed with prejudice and with the court ordering Mohamed's family to bear all the costs of the lawsuit.

=== Immediate responses ===
==== School district ====
School district spokeswoman Lesley Weaver said, "We are never going to take any chances for any of their safety [...] It doesn't matter what child would have brought a suspicious looking item. We still would have taken the same actions." She further said "If the family is willing to give us written permission, we would be happy to share with the public the other side of the story so they can understand the actions we took."

==== Irving's mayor ====
Irving Mayor Beth Van Duyne defended the actions of the police and the Irving Independent School District, stating that they were following the procedure set when a "potential threat" is discovered. Van Duyne said that from the information she had seen, Mohammed had been "non-responsive" and "passive aggressive" in response to questions from police officers.

Van Duyne said there was one-sided reporting of the interaction between Mohammed and police, saying that they are unable to release records because Mohammed is a juvenile and his family has refused to allow it. According to The Dallas Morning News, Mohamed's family never received the request to release his records, because the school district mailed it to the wrong lawyer; the letter was later sent to the correct attorneys.

==== Ahmed Mohamed and his family ====
According to Mohamed, when questioned by the school staff as to whether he had tried to make a bomb, he said, "I told them no, I was trying to make a clock." He also questioned the fairness of the situation "because I brought something to school that wasn't a threat to anyone. I didn't do anything wrong. I just showed my teachers something and I end up being arrested later that day."

On September 18, Mohamed Elhassan Mohamed announced that his son would either be transferring to a private school or be home-schooled. The family has since withdrawn all of their children from schools in the Irving Independent School District, and the father said the events emotionally affected his son, who was not eating well and having trouble sleeping. He said, "It's torn the family and makes us very confused." Though many schools offered to enroll Mohamed, his father said he wanted to give his son time before making a decision.

The family hired counsel "to pursue Ahmed's legal rights and regain his science project from the Irving Police Department". The police issued a statement saying that they had made the clock available shortly after the incident and were awaiting pick-up by "the student's father, or his designated representative". Mohamed eventually got the clock back from the police on October 23 shortly before the family left the United States.

In October 2015, the family decided to move to Qatar, where Mohamed continued his education in the capital city Doha with a scholarship from the Qatar Foundation for Education and would attend Qatar Academy. Mohamed's uncle said another reason for the family's leaving the United States was fear caused by all the attacks they received, the conspiracy theories, rumors, and unwarranted accusations of terrorist links.

The family returned to the Dallas area in June 2016, saying they missed the relatives who had stayed in the U.S., and they would return to Qatar in the fall. In August 2016, it was reported that Ahmed Mohamed would start 10th grade at Qatar Academy in Doha in September 2016.

== Reactions ==
President Obama
(@POTUS44)
tweeted:

Cool clock, Ahmed. Want to bring it to the White House? We should inspire more kids like you to like science. It's what makes America great.

16 Sep 2015

After the initial report in The Dallas Morning News caught his attention, tech blogger Anil Dash created an online form for people to send supportive messages and offer ideas about how to encourage Mohamed. Dash, with more than 500,000 followers on Twitter, was among the earliest to widely publicize the story through social media, and was first to tweet the photo of Mohamed handcuffed, wearing a faded NASA T-shirt and glasses. Within hours, the hashtag #IStandWithAhmed began trending on Twitter and Dash had received thousands of responses.

According to social analytics site Topsy, close to a million people sent out tweets with the supportive hashtag #IstandwithAhmed in less than 24 hours. Mohamed opened his own Twitter account @IStandWithAhmed in the morning of September 16 and had more than 37,000 followers by the afternoon.

Irving Mayor Beth Van Duyne said that Irving's police chief and other police officers, as well as teachers and school administrators, were receiving death threats as a result of the controversy.

Mohamed also received support from President Barack Obama, Hillary Clinton, Mark Zuckerberg, and Sudanese president Omar al-Bashir. Zuckerberg invited Mohamed to Facebook headquarters. Mohamed and his family announced that he was going to the White House for its annual Astronomy Night, where he would have the opportunity to meet other aspiring young scientists.

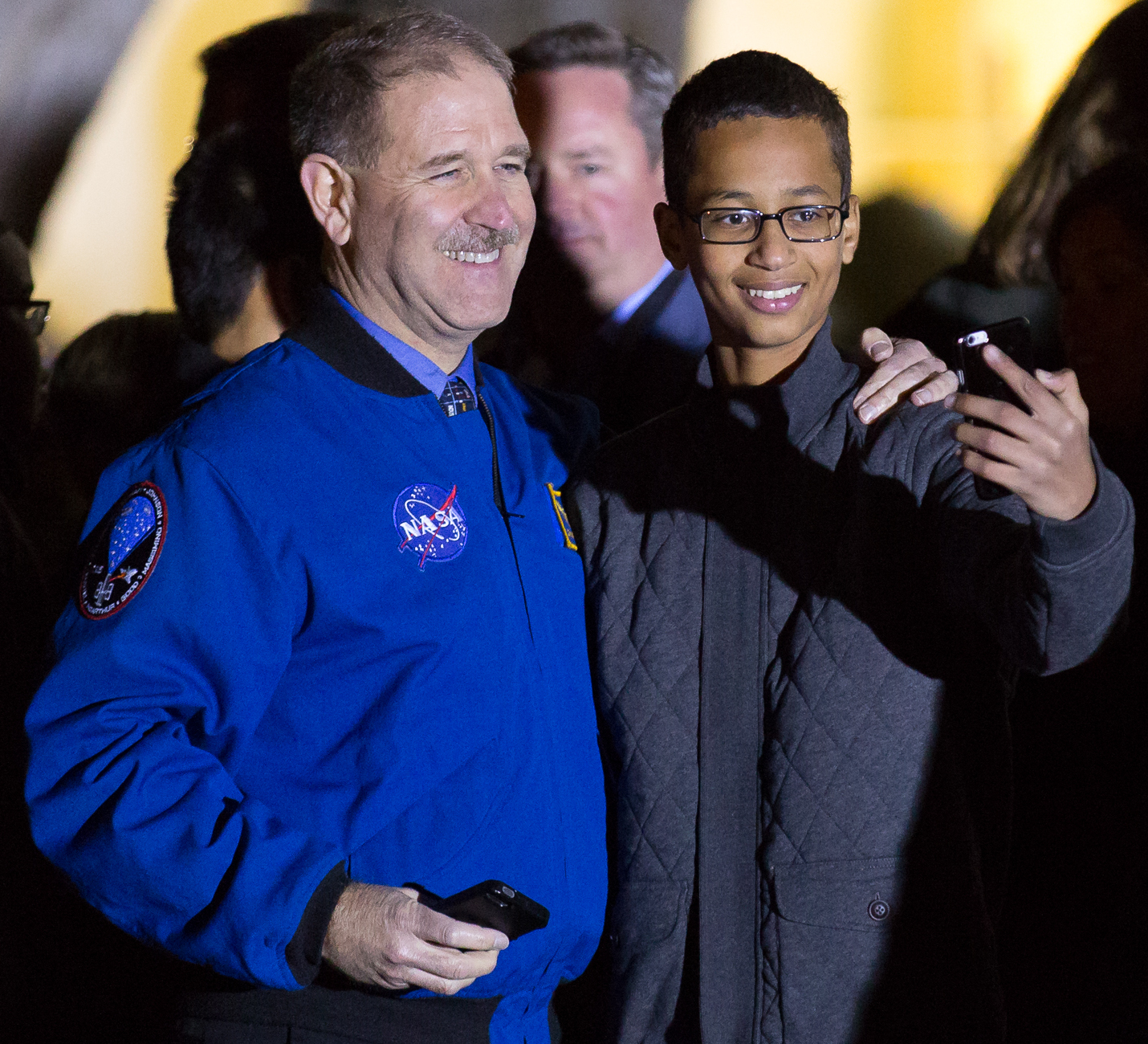
NASA astronaut John M. Grunsfeld with Ahmed Mohamed at the 2015 White House Astronomy Night

Google invited Mohamed to attend its science fair, urging him to bring the clock along; when he arrived he "received a warm welcome, touring the booths and taking pictures with finalists". Twitter offered him a chance to intern with them. Retired Canadian astronaut Chris Hadfield invited Mohamed to his science show in Toronto.

According to Ahmed's father, the family was invited to the headquarters of the United Nations in New York City where, he said, United Nations officials wanted to meet his son. On September 25, 2015, Ahmed met with Turkish Prime Minister Ahmet Davutoğlu, who was in New York attending UN meetings. He was also invited to the Social Good Summit in New York City, and during his visit, he met with Mayor Bill de Blasio, City Comptroller Scott Stringer, Public Advocate Letitia James, and members of New York City Council on a visit arranged by the NYPD Muslim Officers Society.

On October 14, 2015, Ahmed and his father visited the presidential compound of Omar al-Bashir in Khartoum, Sudan. Ahmed's father, Mohamed Elhassan Mohamed, was a former political rival of Bashir, having run against him in the 2015 Sudanese general election. The meeting was reportedly cordial and Bashir expressed the hope that young Sudanese like Ahmed would help “write a new [chapter in] history for an advanced and developed Sudan”. At the time Omar al-Bashir was wanted by the International Criminal Court for war crimes in Darfur.

On October 19, 2015, Mohamed attended the White House Astronomy Night event on the South Lawn of the White House and met with President Obama. The President gave a speech to the audience in attendance at the event, saying: "We have to watch for and cultivate and encourage those glimmers of curiosity and possibility, not suppress them, not squelch them." After his speech, the President talked with Mohamed briefly and hugged him, in addition to looking through a telescope and being placed on a call with the crew of the International Space Station.

In late February 2016, the school district filed suit against the Texas Attorney General, in order to challenge an order that the school district release a copy of a letter sent by the U.S. Department of Justice to the school district while investigating the case. According to The Dallas Morning News, the letter had described allegations of "both harassment and the discipline of students on the basis of race, religion and national origin".

After the incident, MacArthur High School's 2015 valedictorian, then in college, wrote that MacArthur High School and the Irving Independent School District were very supportive of her and her beliefs as a Muslim, and that she did not experience any instances of religious discrimination or Islamophobia.

== Opinions ==
=== Politicians ===
White House press briefing on incident

In a debate among 2016 Republican presidential candidates, Louisiana Governor Bobby Jindal said that he did not think that a 14-year-old should ever be arrested for bringing a clock to school but defended the police who were "worried about security and safety issues".

Twenty-nine members of the United States Congress, including Asian-American and Muslim members, sent a letter to the U.S. Attorney General at the Department of Justice requesting an investigation of "the civil rights violations that took place during the unjust arrest of Ahmed Mohamed". The letter said "Ahmed was denied his civil rights on numerous occasions as he was consistently refused his right to speak with his father. Texas Family Code clearly states 'a child may not be left unattended in a juvenile processing office and is entitled to be accompanied by the child's parent, guardian, or other custodian or by the child's attorney.' (Section 52.025)" The letter went on to say that reports about the incident suggested "that Ahmed Mohamed was systematically profiled based on his faith and ethnicity both by the Irving Police Department and MacArthur High School".

Letter from 29 members of the Congress to U.S. Attorney General Loretta Lynch requesting a full investigation into the arrest of Ahmed Mohamed

White House press secretary Josh Earnest said that the incident "is a good illustration of how pernicious stereotypes can prevent even good-hearted people who have dedicated their lives to educating young people from doing the good work that they set out to do", and that Mohamed was invited to the White House South Lawn for Astronomy Night on October 19.

=== Media ===
Techdirt writer Tim Cushing wrote that the Texas "hoax bomb" law Mohamed was accused under was too loosely worded, as a mere reaction by a public safety official was enough to fall under it (regardless of whether someone had intentionally meant to cause such a reaction), and that it could theoretically apply to other legitimate devices (such as phones and road flares) because they can "cause alarm or reaction of any type" from a public safety officer. At the same time, he wrote that the school itself may have also violated the same law, as they presented the clock to police as potentially being an explosive device.

Rose Hackman of The Guardian stated, "The incident caused international outrage, with critics claiming such drastic treatment would never have occurred had the teenager not been Muslim." Writing in The Texas Observer, Patrick Michels said the Irving school district has a history of overly-punitive criminalization of childhood behavior and similarly called the arrest an example of "school-to-prison" thinking. "A child learns in school that he's a criminal, and he remembers that lesson for the rest of his life", Michels wrote.

The Wall Street Journal commentator James Taranto said he believes what happened to Mohamed is not uncommon; he points to a similar story from 2001 in New Jersey, in which Jason Anagnos, a nine-year-old non-Muslim boy, was arrested, charged and convicted for having brought a fake bomb along on a gifted-and-talented class field trip.

George Takei, the Japanese-American actor who played Sulu on Star Trek, wrote an open letter to Mohamed, offering his support and drawing a parallel between Mohamed's experiences and those of the Japanese Americans (including Takei and his family) who were interned in the United States during World War II.

Kevin D. Williamson, a correspondent for the conservative magazine National Review, argued that the media was pushing a case for exaggerated Islamophobia, "because it can be used to further a story that the media already want to tell: that the United States is morally corrupt and irredeemably racist; that Muslims are under siege; that white privilege blinds the majority of Americans to the corruption at the heart of everything red, white, and blue", stating we now live in a time of "race-hustling and grievance-mongering". He contrasted the high level of media coverage for the incident with that of a lesser-reported incident involving the arrest of an eighth-grader for refusing to remove a National Rifle Association T-shirt in class.

Bill Maher said on his HBO series Real Time with Bill Maher that Mohamed deserves an apology but that his clock "looks exactly like a fucking bomb". In the same "Real Time" interview, entrepreneur Mark Cuban, one of the panelists on the show, stated that he called Mohamed on the phone to discuss the event and Mohamed's interest in technology, but could hear Mohamed being prompted with answers to his questions by Mohamed's sister in the background.

=== Conspiracy theories ===
The Dallas Morning News and other media sources, including The Washington Post, referred to some comments and claims that emerged in the aftermath of the incident as conspiracy theories, reporting that most of them "cited no evidence, contradicted each other, or clashed with known facts". Viral online posts sought to cast suspicion on Mohamed's family and Muslim groups that supported Mohamed after his detainment, positing that Mohamed planned to provoke his arrest to embarrass police and speculating the incident was a plot orchestrated by Islamist activists.

After reviewing these theories, Avi Selk of The Dallas Morning News wrote: "No theory that The News has reviewed cites any evidence that Ahmed, who routinely brought electronic creations to his middle school and said he wanted to impress high school teachers, planned to get handcuffed and hit the news" and reported that "a police 'investigation determined the student apparently did not intend to cause alarm bringing the device to school'." Slate observed that at no point did officials exhibit any concern that the clock was dangerous. The Washington Post and Time also noted that Internet-spawned "conspiracy theories" about Mohamed's motivations were partially responsible for his family choosing to leave the United States.

=== Others ===
Avatar of NASA

NASA
(@NASA)
tweeted:

We're supporters of #STEM & inspiring kids like Ahmed to pursue their dreams. Get involved: go.nasa.gov/1NxQJIz

16 Sep 2015

Terri Burke, executive director of the ACLU of Texas, stated, "Islamophobia, and probably racism, certainly played a role in Ahmed's ordeal, but the fact is overzealous administrators, zero-tolerance policies, and law enforcement officers ill-equipped to deal with schoolchildren have compromised educational environments throughout the country. [...] Ahmed suffered through a terrifying, traumatizing, and unjust ordeal. Yet because of the mass exposure of what he endured, he's received invitations to the White House, Facebook headquarters, and the Google science fair. [...] For too many others – the ones whose stories won't go viral – the possibility of the American nightmare remains too real."

According to an article in The New York Observer, the widely circulated photograph of Ahmed in handcuffs wearing a NASA T-shirt has brought attention to the topic of STEM education (science, technology, engineering, mathematics) in America. "And now, children will be inspired to study STEM thanks to Ahmed's continued interest in it beyond all odds."
