= General Intelligence Service (Sudan) =

Sudanese federal agency

- Arabic: جهاز المخابرات العامة
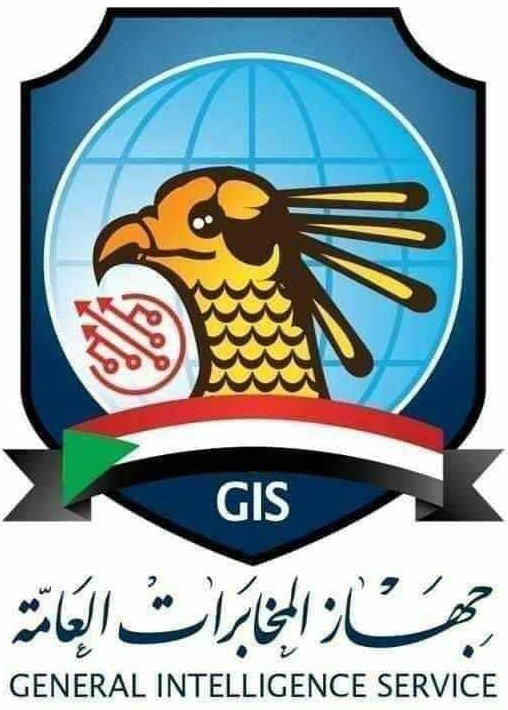
- Seal of the GIS

Agency overview
- Formed: 1956; 70 years ago (original) 2019; 7 years ago (current form)
- Preceding agencies: National Intelligence and Security Service (1999–2019); Security of the Revolution (1989–1999); State Security Organisation (1978–1985, 1988–1989); National Security Organisation (1969–1978) General Security Organisation (1969–1978); Police's Special Branch (1956–1969)
- Jurisdiction: Government of Sudan
- Headquarters: Khartoum, Sudan; 15°35′51″N 32°32′29.5″E
- Agency executive: Ahmed Ibrahim Ali Mufaddal, Director
- Website: https://www.gis.gov.sd/

The General Intelligence Service (GIS) (Arabic: جهاز المخابرات العامة, romanized: Jihaaz Al Amn Al Watani Wal Mukhaabaraat) is the intelligence service of the federal government of Sudan, created in July 2019 from the former National Intelligence and Security Service (NISS) by the Transitional Military Council during the Sudanese Revolution in response to demands from protestors to close down NISS because of its role in repression.

From the early days of the Police's Special Branch and nascent army intelligence, through the omnipresent State Security Organisation of Gaafar Nimeiry and the all-powerful National Intelligence and Security Service of Omar al-Bashir, up to the contested intelligence landscape of today, these organisations have been central to regime survival, domestic surveillance, and internal conflict. Their formal structures and names have changed with each political era, but their core function, controlling and managing internal threats to the state (or regime), has remained a defining feature of Sudanese governance.

== History ==
=== Republic of Sudan (1956–1969) ===
Upon Sudan's independence in 1956, the country inherited colonial-era security structures. The Police's Special Branch, an intelligence division of the police under the Ministry of Interior, continued to handle internal security and surveillance. The armed forces maintained a relatively small military intelligence unit primarily focused on the ongoing southern insurgency and military affairs.

During General Ibrahim Abboud's military rule (1958–1964), a state of emergency was declared and repressive laws (such as the 1958 Sudan Defence Act) were enacted to suppress dissent. However, no major overhaul of the intelligence apparatus occurred in this period; the Special Branch remained largely intact and carried on domestic surveillance and counter-subversion. Military Intelligence at this stage worked in tandem with police intelligence, sharing responsibility for internal security. The regime relied on these organisations to monitor political opponents (e.g. communists and trade unionists) and manage unrest, but the intelligence apparatus was not yet as pervasive or separate as it would later become.

The October 1964 Revolution ended Abboud's rule and ushered in a brief period of civilian government. During the democratic regime (1964–1969), the basic structure of internal intelligence remained unchanged: the Police's Special Branch continued its role, and military intelligence focused on army matters and counterinsurgency. A National Security Act was passed in 1967 to reform Sudan's security services, but it was never implemented. Thus, throughout the 1960s, Sudan's internal intelligence functions were still handled by the Police's Special Branch. Surveillance of political groups continued (particularly as Khartoum managed a resurgent civil war in the south), but intelligence activity during the second democratic period was constrained by law and oversight compared to military regimes. This situation set the stage for sweeping changes after the coup of 1969.

=== Democratic Republic of Sudan (1969–1985) ===
Colonel Gaafar Nimeiry's coup on 25 May 1969 fundamentally reorganised Sudan's intelligence apparatus. The new regime immediately expanded the military's role in internal security. Under the National Revolutionary Command Council (NRCC), military intelligence was enlarged and directed to investigate and neutralise domestic opposition groups. Following a Communist-backed coup attempt in 1971, the regime created distinct security organisations: in late 1969, the National Security Organisation (NSO) was formed out of the army's intelligence branch, and the General Security Organisation (GSO) was carved out of the police's intelligence. By 1973, the GSO was removed from police control and placed under direct executive authority, wielding broad powers of search, arrest, and detention. This dual structure, military NSO and civilian GSO, gave Nimeiry's government an extensive reach in internal surveillance and counter-intelligence.

In August 1978, Nimeiry merged these bodies into the State Security Organisation (SSO). The SSO was placed under Major General Omar Muhammad al-Tayib, a close confidant of Nimeiry (he was later vice president), and it grew into a vast apparatus with about 45,000 personnel, rivaling the regular armed forces in size. The SSO combined military intelligence resources with secret police functions and became the regime's principal tool of internal control. It monitored and repressed political opponents through widespread surveillance, arbitrary arrests, disappearances, and special security courts with draconian powers.

The military intelligence under Nimeiry took on a counter-coup role, after 1971 it focused on detecting threats within the armed forces, even providing a dedicated 400-man presidential guard unit for Nimeiry's protection. The SSO's mandate extended across domestic security: it coordinated intelligence from the army and police, ran its own detention centers, managed censorship, and oversaw border security (e.g. passport control). By the early 1980s, the mere name "State Security" evoked fear among Sudanese, as the SSO had effectively become a secret police force enforcing Nimeiry's one-party state. This apparatus was notorious for severe human rights abuses, which included torture of detainees and harsh "State Security Courts" for political cases.

Nimeiry's security apparatus persisted until his overthrow on 6 April 1985. Following the popular uprising that toppled Nimeiry, the SSO was dissolved and its legal foundations (the 1973 National Security Act and 1978 SSO Act) were repealed. The dismantling of the SSO marked the end of an era in which military intelligence and state security were fused into an all-powerful internal security organisation. Many of its operatives were purged or fled; some files and records of the SSO's activities came to light during the post-Nimeiry transitional justice efforts. However, the legacy of an intelligence apparatus deeply involved in domestic repression would influence all subsequent Sudanese governments.

=== Second democracy (1985–1989) ===
After Nimeiry's fall, Sudan experienced a brief return to civilian rule under a Transitional Military Council (TMC) followed by an elected coalition government led by Prime Minister Sadiq al-Mahdi (1986–1989). In this period, there was an attempt to reform and civilify the intelligence sector. The State Security laws of the prior regime were scrapped, and initially the security services were comparatively restrained. Many intelligence functions reverted to the regular police and military in a more limited capacity, with greater respect for civil liberties.

However, growing insecurity, including the ongoing Second Sudanese Civil War and coup plots, led to a resurgence of the security apparatus. In 1987 the government declared a state of emergency amid intensifying conflicts. By 1988, the Sadiq al-Mahdi government enacted a new State Security Act (1988) and formed new security forces under its provisions. This effectively resurrected an internal intelligence organisation, though on a smaller scale than Nimeiry's SSO. The new security entity, operating under the Prime Minister's supervision, was granted broad powers of arrest and detention to combat insurgencies and conspiracies. Reports from that time indicate that military intelligence and police Special Branch officers were again coordinating closely to monitor dissidents, rebels, and even Islamist groups (like Hassan al-Turabi's National Islamic Front, which was then in opposition).

Despite these measures, the civilian government's control over the intelligence apparatus was weak. Factionalism and economic crisis plagued the regime. On 30 June 1989, a group of army officers led by Brigadier Omar al-Bashir, tacitly backed by the National Islamic Front, seized power in a coup. The coup succeeded in part because elements of the military intelligence and security forces either supported it or were neutralised. The new junta would soon rebuild an even more formidable internal security system.

=== Republic of Sudan (1985–2019) ===
From 1989 onward, Sudan's military intelligence apparatus was reorganised and greatly expanded under President Omar al-Bashir's Islamist regime. The junta, called the Revolutionary Command Council for National Salvation (RCCNS), immediately imposed emergency rule and created a parallel Islamist security organisation commonly known as Islamic Security or Security of the Revolution. This organisation, led by an NIF cadre on the RCCNS, was given a mandate to "protect the revolution", effectively acting as a secret police with authority above other law enforcement. It served as a watchdog over the regular armed forces and police, guarding against internal plots, and was infamous for indiscriminate arrests and torture in clandestine "ghost houses". During the early 1990s, government surveillance intensified dramatically: civilians suspected of dissidence were harassed, church services were monitored, the press was censored, and neighborhood "popular committees" even used control of ration cards to spy on households. These years saw the rise of Sudan's modern mukhabarat (intelligence) state.

Formally, Bashir's regime introduced new legislation to legitimise its security apparatus. A National Security Act of 1990 established the post-coup national security system. This was followed by the National Security Act of 1995, which granted extraordinarily broad powers to the intelligence agencies, including preventive detention of suspects for up to six months without charge and near-total immunity for security officers. Detainees had no right to judicial review or appeal under this lawredress.org. These Acts laid the legal foundation for an intelligence organisation that was both powerful and shielded from accountability.

Seal of the former NISS.

In practice, this organisation evolved into the National Intelligence and Security Service (NISS) (Arabic: جهاز الأمن والمخابرات الوطني السوداني, romanized: Jihaaz Al Amn Wal Mukhaabaraat Al Watani). Though the name "NISS" was commonly used later (especially after the late 1990s), Sudan's mukhabarat in the 1990s already functioned as a unified internal and external intelligence service under direct presidential control. The NISS was officially codified by the National Security Forces Act of 1999, which not only ratified its existence but also perpetuated its exceptional powers and lack of oversight. A subsequent National Security Act in 2010 (during an interim peace period) retained these broad powers, despite calls to curtail the agency's mandate. By law, NISS officers had powers of arrest, search, seizure, and could detain individuals for prolonged periods in the name of "national security".

Throughout Bashir's 30-year rule, NISS emerged as the most powerful arm of the regime, eclipsing the military's own intelligence wing in domestic matters. NISS effectively functioned as Sudan's secret police, tasked with silencing political opposition and rebellion. It conducted widespread domestic surveillance, censored media, and ran a network of detention centers known for torturing regime opponents (infamous "ghost houses"). The agency also kept close watch over government institutions and even other security organisations, a deliberate strategy to prevent any single power center from challenging al-Bashir. Military Intelligence within the army continued to operate (focusing on military affairs and internal army discipline), but it was closely monitored by NISS and largely subordinated in the realm of internal security. Al-Bashir fostered rivalry between the army's military intelligence, NISS, and other forces as a coup-proofing measure, giving them overlapping responsibilities and separate lines of command.

Crucially, the regime integrated various paramilitary and militia forces into the intelligence-security nexus. In the Second Sudanese Civil War and later conflicts, military intelligence and NISS coordinated counterinsurgency operations, often using proxy militias. During the Darfur conflict, NISS officers (notably Major General Salah Gosh, who became NISS Director in 2004) were deeply involved in organising and directing the Janjaweed militias and other counter-insurgency campaigns. As international pressure grew over Darfur genocide, NISS simultaneously positioned itself as a global intelligence player, for instance, Gosh cultivated ties with the CIA by sharing valuable intelligence on al-Qaeda and other Islamists (Sudan had hosted Osama bin Laden in the 1990s, and Sudanese mukhabarat had amassed detailed files on his network.

By the mid-2000s, It is widely accepted that in addition to its domestic operations, the NISS ran operations and agents throughout the Middle East, North Africa and Western Europe. The secretive organisation's most well known operation was its massive intelligence network in Iraq, which it was able to build by recruiting foreign fighters passing through Khartoum on their way to Iraq.

Domestically, NISS was "regularised" as a fighting force by 2008, with its officers granted military ranks and the agency taking formal command of multiple paramilitary units. At this time, NISS became the parent organisation of the newly created Rapid Support Forces (RSF), a paramilitary force officially formed in 2013 out of the Janjaweed militias. The RSF, led by Mohamed Hamdan Dagalo ("Hemedti"), was deployed as an internal shock force in conflict zones (Darfur, South Kordofan, Blue Nile) and as a praetorian guard for al-Bashir. Hemedti, a close ally of al-Bashir, was even nicknamed "Hemayti" ("my protector") by the president.

During al-Bashir's era, several figures became synonymous with Sudan's intelligence establishment. Salah Abdallah "Salah Gosh" stands out: as NISS director (2004–2009 and again 2018–2019), he was regarded as the regime's most feared enforcer. Under Gosh, NISS orchestrated crackdowns on civil society and engineered ruthless responses to protests, such as using live ammunition on demonstrators in 2018–19. Earlier, Nafie Ali Nafie was another key architect, he headed internal security in the 1990s and was known for establishing the regime's notorious torture centers. Nafie later served as a top presidential advisor. These men, along with other NISS and Military Intelligence chiefs, used the tools of surveillance and coercion to keep Bashir in power for decades. By fragmenting the security sector (army, NISS, police, and paramilitaries checking each other), Bashir ensured that the intelligence apparatus remained loyal to him personally.

=== Sudanese transition to democracy (2019–2021) ===
On 11 April 2019, a massive civilian uprising and pressure from within the security forces led to Omar al-Bashir's ouster. It was Bashir's own security chiefs, including military and NISS leaders, who ultimately forced him to step down, including Gosh, who was replaced by Lt. Gen. Abu Bakr Mustafa, on 14 April 2019. After the coup, Sudan's new Transitional Military Council (TMC), the de facto executive power in Sudan, moved swiftly to reorganise the intelligence apparatus. Responding to protesters' demands to dismantle the "deep state" of the old regime, the TMC dissolved the NISS and announced the formation of a rebranded agency, the General Intelligence Service (GIS) in July 2019. Official reasons cited for the name rebranding included "[coping] with the political change in the country" and "[becoming] more professional in protecting the country and safeguarding its national security against very complicated threats".

The GIS was essentially the successor to NISS, but with promises (on paper) of reform, including a stated focus on information gathering rather than political repression. The notorious Operations Division of NISS, which had been responsible for much of the heavy-handed internal security operations, was slated for disbandment. NISS personnel were given options to retire or to be absorbed into the regular army or the RSF. According to The Washington Post, most of the former NISS agents chose neither to remain in GIS nor to accept the option to join alternative Sudanese armed services, and instead to accept a monetary package. The initially proposed value of the severance pay was around US$2,500 and was later reduced to around US$250. On 14 January 2020, several of the former NISS agents, angry at the reduced value of the severance, mutinied. Government security forces regained control of the rebelling former NISS employees within several hours. Hemetti of the Sovereignty Council attributed responsibility for the mutiny to former NISS head Salah Gosh (who had fled abroad), and stated that the mutiny should not be considered to be a coup attempt. The Washington Post interpreted the incident as "probably a haphazard show of anger by frustrated corps members who are now out of a job, rather than an attempt to overthrow the regime." The head of GIS, Abu Bakr Mustafa, resigned as a result of the event.

Under the subsequent civilian-military transitional government (2019–2021), efforts were made to draft new security legislation to place the GIS under civilian oversight and curtail its arrest powers. In practice, however, the GIS (headed by generals such as Abu Bakr Dambalab, and later Lt. Gen. Jamal Abdelmajeed and Lt. Gen. Ahmed Mufaddal) remained dominated by the military establishment. The agency continued to conduct internal intelligence and counter-intelligence, though with somewhat lower profile during the transition. It still monitored political activities and maintained surveillance on potential saboteurs, while pledging to respect the law more than its predecessor. Notably, inter-service dynamics persisted: the RSF, now an officially recognised force, developed its own intelligence wing and often acted independently, while the army's Military Intelligence Department regained a central role in shaping security policy following al-Bashir's fall.

=== 2021 coup and civil war ===
On 25 October 2021, Sudan's military, led by Gen. Abdel Fattah al-Burhan and RSF chief Hemedti, staged a coup that ended the civilian-led transition. This put the intelligence apparatus fully back under military control. The GIS under al-Burhan's rule has reportedly resumed some of the practices of NISS, including detention of leaders of the resistance committees and other protest leaders, and surveillance of activists.

The RSF, initially a partner to the military during the coup, later became a rival. On 15 April 2023, fighting erupted between the RSF and the Sudanese Armed Forces (SAF). This schism within Sudan's security organs is rooted partly in al-Bashir-era fragmentation.

== Military Intelligence Directorate ==
As outlined above, the military intelligence has been part and separate from the civilian branch of the intelligence, sometimes named by news outlets interchangeably. Since 1992, the military intelligence operates under the Military Intelligence Directorate (Arabic: هيئة الاستخبارات العسكرية, MID), overseen by the military. The MID has been accused of committing human right abuses during the civil war (2023–present).

The current director is Lit. Gen. Mohamed Ali Ahmed Sabir, who was sanctioned by the EU on 16 December 2024 for "harassment, arbitrary arrests and detention of members of civil society, as well as acts of sexual and gender-based violence and torture".

== See also ==
- Tsimdo – Rebel military and politician coalition in Ethiopia
