= 1983 Sudanese presidential election =

- 14 and 25 April 1983
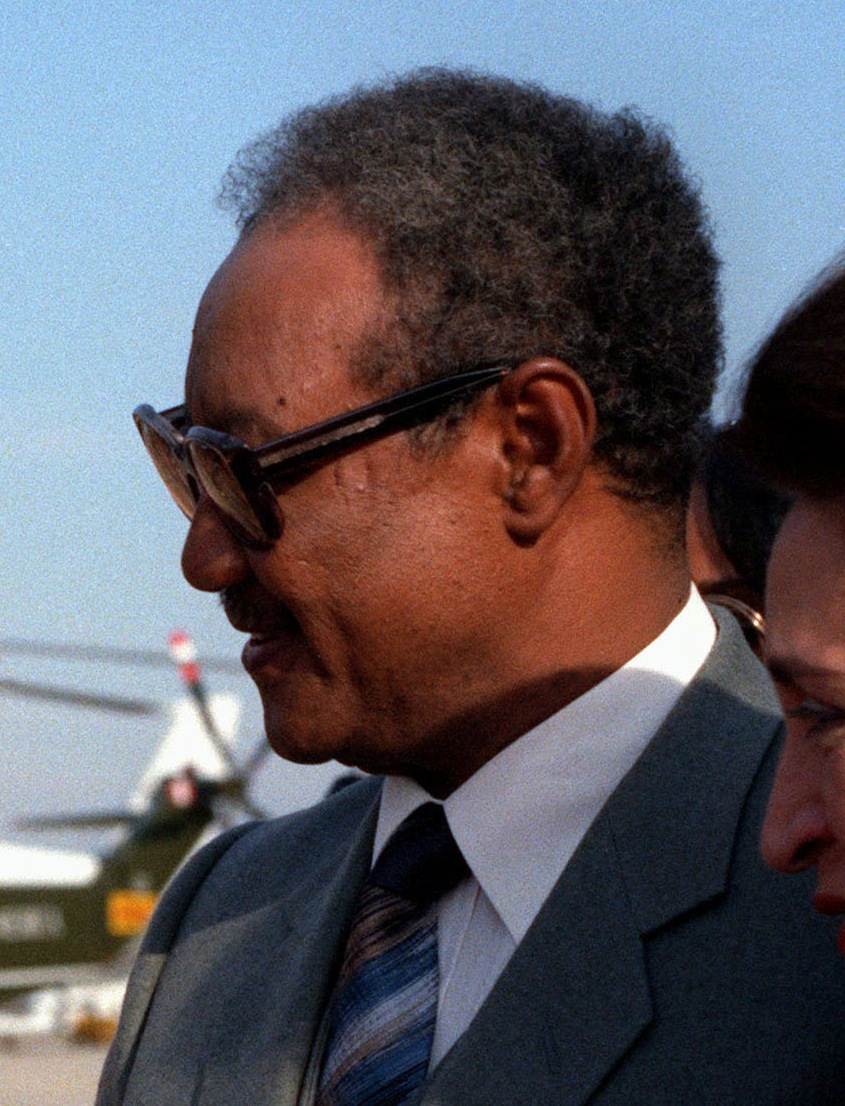
Nominee	Jaafar Nimeiry
Party	SSU
Percentage	99.6%
President before election
Jaafar Nimeiry
SSU
Elected President
Jaafar Nimeiry
SSU

Presidential elections were held in Sudan between 14 and 25 April 1983. Jaafar Nimeiry was the only candidate, and received 99.6% of the vote.

== Results ==
Candidate	Party	Votes	%
Jaafar Nimeiry	Sudanese Socialist Union		99.6
Against			0.4
Total			
Source: African Elections Database
