= Chiefs Courts Ordinance =

1931 Sudanese law

The Chiefs Courts Ordinance was a law in the Sudan, passed by the Anglo-Egyptian colonial authorities in 1931. The law conveyed judicial and political powers to government-recognized chiefs in the southern areas of the country. The chief were, through this law, charged with tax collection, overseeing infrastructure constructions and administering native areas' of towns and given the authority to issue punishments upon the local population. Through this law, and the corresponding Native Courts Ordinance for the northern parts of the Sudan, introduced what would be termed the 'Native Administration' by the British colonial system.
