= Qatar Academy =

Group of private co-educational schools

Qatar Academy (QA) is a group of private, co-educational schools in Qatar. The group is administered by Qatar Foundation. It is an IB World School that offers the IB Primary Years Programme, IB Middle Years Programme, and IB Diploma Programme.

There are currently five branches of the school operating in Qatar:

- Qatar Academy Doha
- Qatar Academy Msheireb
- Qatar Academy Sidra
- Qatar Academy Al Khor
- Qatar Academy Al Wakrah

== Alumni ==
- Ahmed Mohamed
