= People's Local Government Act =

The People's Local Government Act was a Sudanese legislation. It was passed in 1971, under the Gaafar Nimeiry regime. The law formally abolished the system of local government and judiciary based upon traditional chiefs and sheikhs inherited from the colonial period (the system the British colonialists had dubbed the 'Native Administration'). Under this legislation local councils were formed, linked to the Sudanese Socialist Union party of Nimeri. However, the law was never fully implemented in the southern areas of the country and traditional chiefs continued to exercise judicial and political powers there.
