= 1977 Sudanese presidential election =

- 10–20 April 1977
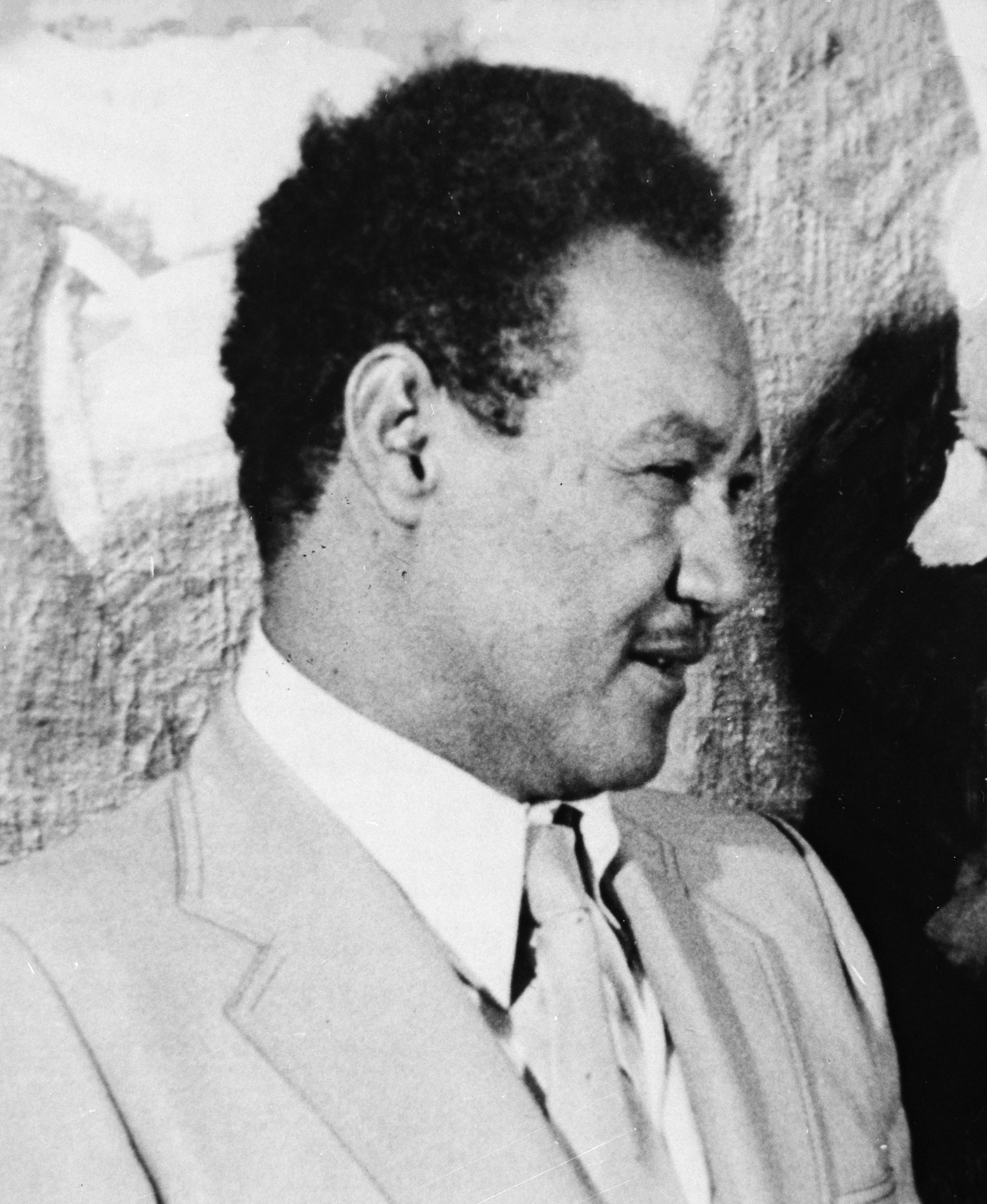
Nominee	Jaafar Nimeiry
Party	SSU
Popular vote	5,624,128
Percentage	99.1%
President before election
Jaafar Nimeiry
SSU
Elected President
Jaafar Nimeiry
SSU

Presidential elections were held in Sudan between 10 and 20 April 1977. Jaafar Nimeiry was the only candidate, and received 99.1% of the vote, with a 98.3% turnout.

== Results ==
Candidate	Party	Votes	%
Jaafar Nimeiry	Sudanese Socialist Union	5,624,128	99.15
Against		48,373	0.85
Total		5,672,501	100.00
Registered voters/turnout		5,839,882	–
Source: African Elections Database
