= 1980 Sudanese parliamentary election =

Parliamentary elections were held in Sudan between 28 April and 10 May 1980. The People's Assembly had been increased from 304 to 368 seats, of which 332 were elected and 36 were appointed by President Gaafar Nimeiry.

At the time, the Sudanese Socialist Union was the sole legal party, and it won all 368 seats.

== Results ==
Party	Seats	+/–
Sudanese Socialist Union	332	+58
Appointed members	36	+6
Total	368	+64
Source: IPU
