= Fatima Abdel Mahmoud =

Sudanese politician (1944–2018)

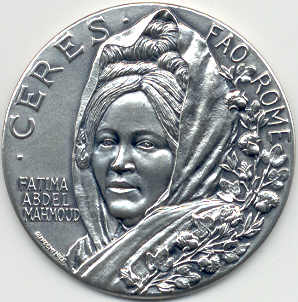
- The FAO Ceres award with a depiction of Fatima Abdel Mahmoud
- Born: 27 July 1944; Omdurman, Sudan
- Died: 22 July 2018 (aged 73); London, England
- Education: Medical degree from Moscow, Russia
- Occupations: Politician, Paediatrician
- Known for: First female presidential candidate in Sudan (2010)
- Office: Deputy Minister of Youth, Sports, and Social Affairs
- Political party: Sudanese Socialist Democratic Union
- Awards: FAO CERES Medal (1976)

Fatima Abdel Mahmoud (27 July 1944, Omdurman, Sudan – 22 July 2018, London, England) was a Sudanese politician, leader of the Sudanese Socialist Democratic Union. In 1973 she was one of the first women to hold political office in Sudan, and she took part in the April 2010 Sudanese general election as the country's first female presidential candidate.

== Parliamentary career ==
Abdel Mahmoud was born on 27 July 1944. She studied medicine in Moscow, Russia, in the 1960s and qualified as a paediatrician. In 1973 she was appointed Deputy Minister of Youth, Sports, and Social Affairs. This appointment, along with that of Sayeda Nafisa Ahmed al Amin as a member of the ruling Sudanese Socialist Union politburo, made international news at a time when contemporary estimates put the Sudanese female literacy rate at 10%. Abdel Mahmoud served in parliament for ten years.

== Presidential candidacy ==
In April 2010 Sudan held its first fully contested elections (i.e. the first to include candidates from opposition parties) since 1986. Abdel Mahmoud's presidential candidacy, along with that of two other aspirants, was rejected in January 2010 by the Sudanese National Elections Commission, which claimed that Abdel Mahmoud's campaign had failed to secure the necessary stamps on a required list of signatures endorsing her candidacy. Abdel Mahmoud and her supporters protested the decision, which they described as representative of a conspiracy against women, and her candidacy was reinstated by an appeal court before the election.

Many opposition parties eventually boycotted the poll, claiming that it was rigged in favour of incumbent president Omar al-Bashir. Al-Bashir went on to win the election decisively. Election results showed that Abdel Mahmoud had polled 0.3% of the total vote. She subsequently stood in the 2015 general election in Sudan, where she came a distant third in the presidential election and her party gained no seats in the National Assembly.

== Other activity ==
Honored with FAO CERES Medal in 1976.

Abdel Mahmoud had served as the UNESCO Chair for Women in Science and Technology, which was hosted by Sudan University of Science and Technology.

She died in London, England on 22 July 2018, five days before her 74th birthday.
