= 1978 Sudanese parliamentary election =

Parliamentary elections were held in Sudan between 2 and 11 February 1978. The People's Assembly had been increased from 250 to 304 seats, of which 274 were elected and 30 were appointed by President Gaafar Nimeiry.

At the time, the Sudanese Socialist Union was the sole legal party, and it won all 274 seats.

== Results ==
Party	Seats
Sudanese Socialist Union	274
Appointed members	30
Total	304
Source: IPU
