= 2015 Sudanese general election =

- 13–16 April 2015
- Presidential election
- Turnout: 46.40%
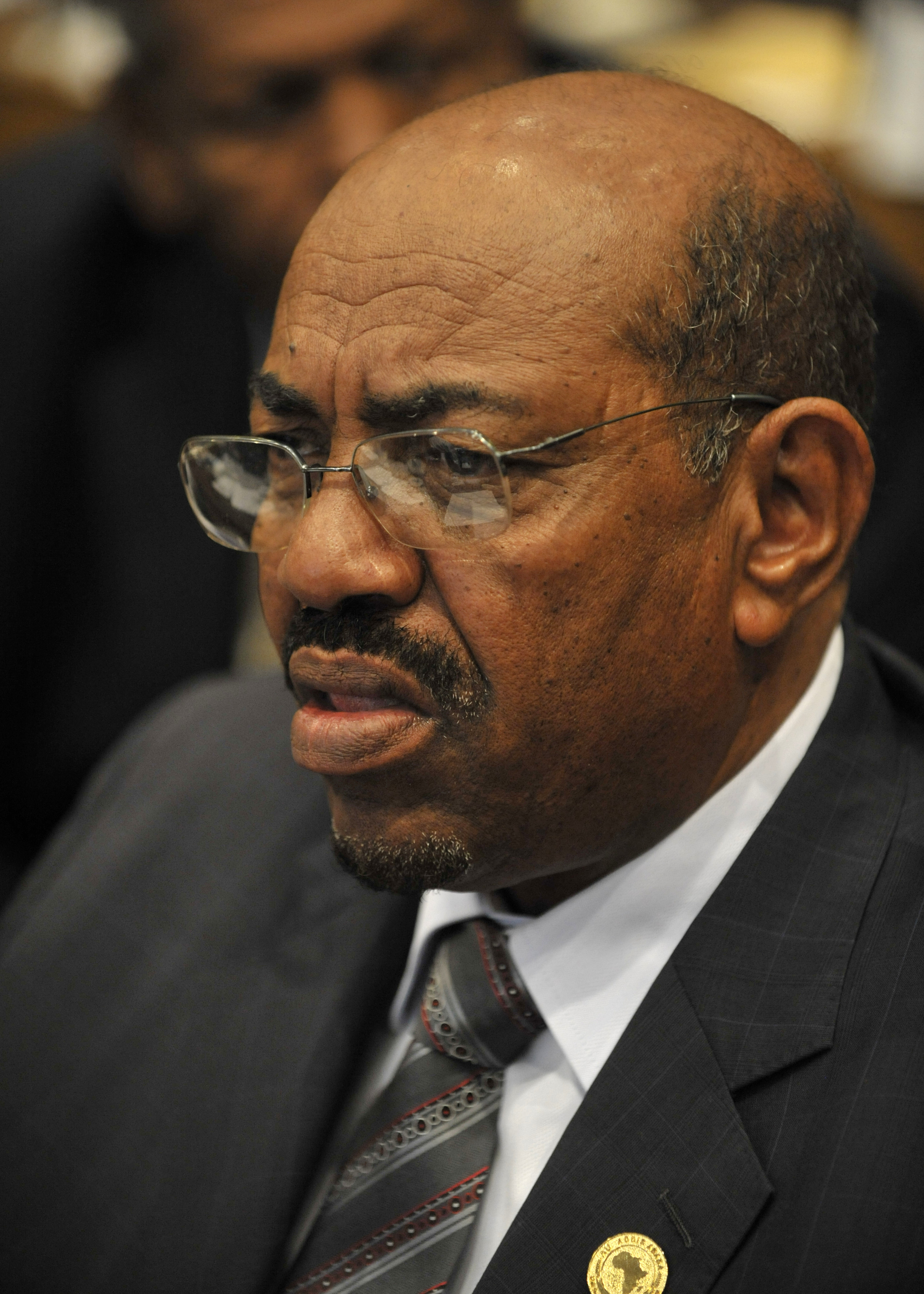

Nominee	Omar al-Bashir	Fadl el-Sayed Shuaib
Party	National Congress	Federal Truth
Popular vote	5,252,478	79,779
Percentage	94.05%	1.43%
President before election
Omar al-Bashir
National Congress
Elected President
Omar al-Bashir
National Congress

General elections were held in Sudan on 13–16 April 2015 to elect the President and the National Assembly. They were originally scheduled for 2 April, but were delayed by eleven days. These were the first elections to be held following the secession of South Sudan.

Incumbent President Omar al-Bashir won the presidential election by a landslide, amid a boycott from the majority of the opposition. The ruling National Congress Party of Sudan also won a majority in the 426 seats of the National Assembly.

== Electoral system ==
The President was elected using the two-round system; if no candidate gained a majority of the vote in the first round, a run-off would have been held.

The 426 seats of the National Assembly were elected by three methods:

- Half seats (50%) were elected by majority voting in multi-member constituencies based on the 18 states and containing between 4 and 36 seats.
- 128 seats (30%) reserved for women were elected by closed list proportional representation in a single national constituency.
- 85 seats (20%) unreserved were elected by the same system.

== Conduct ==
=== Campaign ===
Incumbent President Omar al-Bashir was re-selected as the presidential candidate of the National Congress Party (NCP) in October 2014. Fifteen other candidates registered to contest the elections, although they are relatively unknown.

The majority of opposition parties were boycotting the elections, although a total of 44 parties put forward candidates. However, the ruling NCP opted not to field candidates in 30% of constituencies in order to allow other parties to win seats.

=== Observers ===
Election observer missions (EOM) were deployed from the African Union (AU), Arab League, Common Market for Eastern and Southern Africa (COMESA), Intergovernmental Authority on Development (IGAD), Organisation of Islamic Cooperation (OIC); as well as from China, Russia and Turkey.

The African Union's EOM was led by former Nigerian President Olusegun Obasanjo. The AUEOM was "satisfied that voting went on peacefully" and noted that the country "still faces serious challenges to democracy building and national reconciliation". It concluded that the "results.. would reflect the expression of the will of the voters of Sudan".

COMESA EOM noted that the "general environment within which the general elections were organized ha[d] remarkably been peaceful" and commended the Sudanese people. It also noted with concern that the "general elections were boycotted by several opposition political parties".

== Results ==
=== President ===
Turnout by state.

Candidate	Party	Votes	%
Omar al-Bashir	National Congress Party	5,252,478	94.05
Fadl el-Sayed Shuaib	Federal Truth Party	79,779	1.43
Fatima Abdel Mahmoud	Sudanese Socialist Democratic Union	47,653	0.85
Mohamed Elhassan Mohamed	National Reform Party	42,399	0.76
Abdul Mahmoud Abdul Jabar Rahamtalla	Union of the Nation's Forces	41,134	0.74
Hamdi Hassan Ahmed	Independent	18,043	0.32
Mohamed Ahmed Abdul Gadir Al Arbab	Independent	16,966	0.30
Yasser Yahiya Salih Abdul Gadir	Independent	16,609	0.30
Khairi Bakhit	Independent	11,852	0.21
Adel Dafalla Jabir	Independent	9,435	0.17
Mohamed Awad Al Barow	Independent	9,388	0.17
Asad Al Nil Adel Yassin Al Saafi	Independent	9,359	0.17
Alam Al Huda Ahmed Osman Mohamed Ali	Independent	8,133	0.15
Ahmed Al Radhi Jadalla Salem	Independent	7,751	0.14
Isaam Al Ghali Tajj Eddin Ali	Independent	7,587	0.14
Omar Awad Al Karim Hussein Ali	Independent	6,297	0.11
Total		5,584,863	100.00
Valid votes		5,584,863	91.68
Invalid/blank votes		506,549	8.32
Total votes		6,091,412	100.00
Registered voters/turnout		13,126,989	46.40
Source: NEC

=== National Assembly ===
Party	Proportional			Women			Constituency			Total seats	+/–
Party	Votes	%	Seats	Votes	%	Seats	Votes	%	Seats	Total seats	+/–
National Congress Party	3,915,590	78.32	67	4,321,901	83.37	107			149	323	–1
Democratic Unionist Party–Original	218,120	4.36	4	249,768	4.82	6			15	25	+24
Umma Collective Leadership	214,531	4.29	4						2	6	+5
Democratic Unionist Party	114,806	2.30	2	137,265	2.65	3			10	15	+11
Federal Umma Party	79,292	1.59	1	107,102	2.07	3			3	7	+4
Freedom and Justice Party	60,373	1.21	1	36,899	0.71	1			1	3	–
United Umma Party	49,923	1.00	1	63,770	1.23	2			1	4	–
Umma Reform and Development Party	35,309	0.71	1	45,199	0.87	1			3	5	–
National Umma Party	30,966	0.62	1						2	3	+2
Federal Truth Party	30,254	0.61	1	33,046	0.64	1			0	2	–
National Bond Party	30,079	0.60	1	43,199	0.83	1			0	2	–
National Freedom and Justice Party	29,642	0.59	1						3	4	–
Constitution Party	27,466	0.55	0	39,783	0.77	1			0	1	–
Movement for Justice and Equality	26,723	0.53	0	18,493	0.36	0			0	0	–
National Reform Party	25,990	0.52	0	30,107	0.58	1			0	1	–
Popular Forces for Rights and Democracy Movement	23,089	0.46	0	27,260	0.53	1			0	1	–
Justice Party	18,196	0.36	0						0	0	–
National Movement for Peace and Development	17,231	0.34	0	14,732	0.28	0			0	0	–
Sudanese Socialist Democratic Union	16,508	0.33	0						0	0	–
People's Movement Party	14,018	0.28	0	15,595	0.30	0			1	1	–
Sudanese National Front Party	12,740	0.25	0						0	0	–
Sudanese Socialist Union Party al-Maywa	8,686	0.17	0						0	0	–
Centre Party for Justice and Development									1	1	–
General Federation of North and South Funj									1	1	–
Ana al-Sudan									1	1	–
Black Free									1	1	–
Independents									19	19	+16
Total	4,999,532	100.00	85	5,184,119	100.00	128			213	426	–24
Registered voters/turnout	13,126,989	–		13,126,989	–		13,126,989	–			
Source: NEC

== Reactions ==
On 9 April 2015, the European Union said that there was a "lack of a conducive environment for the upcoming elections" and that it was disappointed that the Sudanese government missed an opportunity "by not responding to the efforts by the African Union to bring all stakeholders together."

On 20 April 2015; Norway, the United Kingdom and the United States issued a joint statement saying that the Sudanese Government failed "to create a free, fair, and conducive elections environment" and that the "outcome of these elections cannot be considered a credible expression of the will of the Sudanese people". Following this statement, the Sudanese Foreign Ministry summoned the ambassadors from these countries and condemned the statement as "erroneous information and prejudgment of the elections"; and also deemed it as "flagrant intervention in Sudan's internal affairs." President Bashir labeled the critics as "colonialist parties".

On 21 April 2015, the Sudanese Embassy in London issued a statement saying that other international bodies were clearly biased as they refused to even send their observers and "the claim that unrest in some isolated peripheries reduces the validity of elections does not hold water; because Northern Ireland suffered serious “troubles” for decades and that didn't stop UK elections."

On 28 April 2015, the Chinese Foreign Ministry spokesperson Hong Lei said that they respect "the choice made by the Sudanese people" and congratulated President Bashir on his re-election.

President Bashir also received congratulatory messages from President Abdel Fattah el-Sisi of Egypt, King Abdullah of Jordan, Emir Sabah of Kuwait, Sultan Qaboos of Oman, Emir Tamim of Qatar, King Salman of Saudi Arabia and President Khalifa al Nahyan of the United Arab Emirates.
