= 1981–82 Sudanese parliamentary election =

Parliamentary elections were held in Sudan between 13 November 1981 and 15 January 1982. The People's Assembly had been reduced from 368 to 151 seats, of which 138 were elected and 13 were appointed by President Gaafar Nimeiry.

At the time, the Sudanese Socialist Union was the sole legal party, and it won all 151 seats.

== Results ==
Party	Seats	+/–
Sudanese Socialist Union	138	–194
Appointed members	13	–23
Total	151	–217
Source: IPU
