= Mohamed Elhassan Mohamed =

Sudanese American political candidate (born 1961)

Mohamed Al Hassan
- Born: 1961 (age 64–65)
- Other names: Mohamed Elhasan Mohamed; Mohamed Elhasan
- Spouses: Shirley (divorced 1996); Muna Ahmed Ibraham (1996-current)

Mohamed Al Hassan (aka Mohamed Elhasan Mohamed) (born 1961) is a Sudanese American. He has twice campaigned to become the President of Sudan (in 2010 and 2015).

== Background ==
Mohamed moved from Sudan to the United States in the 1980s. He then moved to Dallas, Texas and delivered pizzas, before driving taxi cabs. In addition, Mohamed created a solar energy development company 'AlSufi International' in Sudan. Mohamed holds dual citizenship in both Sudan and the United States. He is married to Muna Ahmed Ibraham.

== Political candidate ==
Though his name did not appear the ballots, Mohamed ran against Omar al-Bashir for the office of Sudan President in both 2010 and 2015. An April 2015 Bloomberg Business report stated that of President Omar al-Bashir's competitors, Mohamed Elhassan Mohamed "had the most ambitious agenda".

== Islamic activities ==
Mohamed is a Sufi Muslim. He directs the Islamic Sufi Center in Texas, established in the early 1990s. However, according to the Washington Post, he:

"likes to call himself a sheik. He wears a cleric’s flowing white robes and claims hundreds of followers throughout Egypt, Sudan and in the United States. But he is unknown as a scholar or holy man in the state he has called home for two decades. Religious leaders in Texas say they have never heard of Elhassan, including the imam at the mosque where he worships. “This so-called leader, we have never heard of this person,” said Imam Zia ul Haque Sheikh, the head of the Islamic Center of Irving. “I believe the whole thing is made up.” Elhassan has only a handful of followers who chant with him on Saturdays and Sundays at a small prayer center, located in a strip mall, that he founded in 2001 for other Sufi Muslims."

In 2011, after answering an ad he defended the Quran in a mock jury trial against Christian fundamentalist Rev. Terry Jones, but was greatly surprised and saddened by Jones choosing to burn the Quran as part of his exhibition, and led to three days of violence in Afghanistan.

== Lawsuits ==
He is the father of Ahmed Mohamed, who was arrested briefly in 2015 and suspended from attending his high school after bringing in to school a digital clock he had assembled that a teacher believed looked like a hoax bomb, which sparked a controversy over Islamophobia, childhood experimentation and zero-tolerance policies.

The family sent a demand letter on November 23, 2015, saying they would file a lawsuit if they did not receive $15 million ($20,000,000 in current dollar terms) in financial compensation and a public apology from the City of Irving and the Irving School District. The family then filed a lawsuit against the City of Irving and the school district on August 8, 2016. On May 19, 2017, a federal judge dismissed the lawsuit, saying the plaintiff failed to present any facts demonstrating intentional discrimination against Ahmed Mohamed.

Mohamed Mohamed, on behalf of himself and his son Ahmed Mohamed, then filed a second suit, a defamation suit, in Dallas County District Court on September 21, 2016. The named defendants included The Blaze, Glenn Beck, Center for Security Policy (CSP), Fox Television Stations, Ben Ferguson, Ben Shapiro, Beth Van Duyne, and Jim Hanson. A hearing was held on December 16, 2016, during which claims against defendants KDFW Fox 4 and Ben Ferguson were dismissed with prejudice (meaning the suit could not be re-filed, though the decision could be appealed). In January 2017, the judge granted Hanson's and CSP's motion to dismiss (releasing TheBlaze, Glenn Beck, Jim Hanson, and the CSP), and in February 2017 the judge granted Shapiro's motion to dismiss. Legal fees were awarded to the defendants, and an appeal by Mohamed of the dismissals and legal fee awards was denied in 2018.

On March 13, 2018, he filed a third federal lawsuit as Ahmed Mohamed's father against the Irving Independent School District, the City of Irving, and several individuals, was dismissed with prejudice and with the court ordering Mohamed's family to bear all the costs of the lawsuit.
