= 1985 Sudanese coup d'état =

Military overthrow of President Gaafar Nimeiry

- Part of the Second Sudanese Civil War and the Arab Cold War
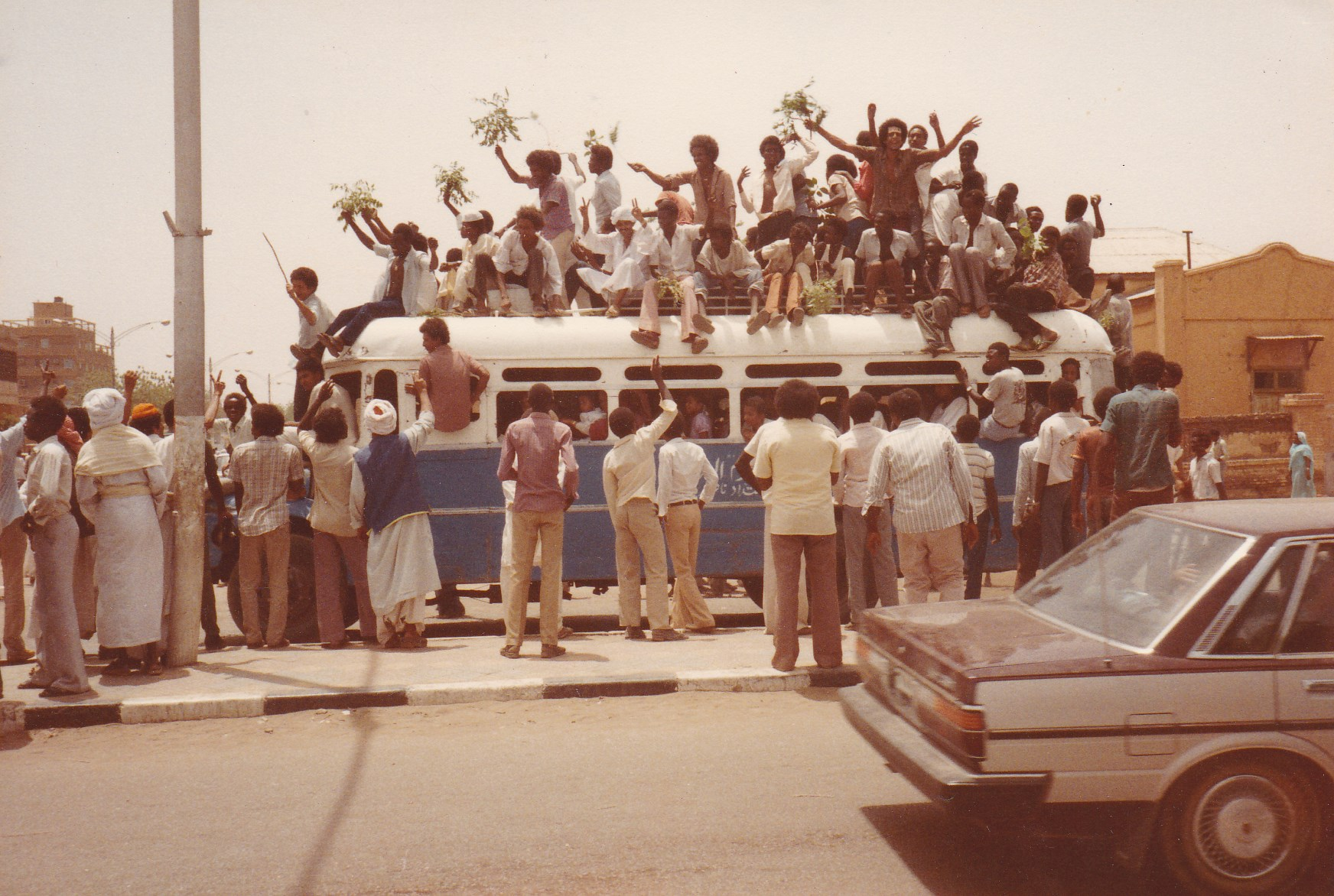
- Sudanese celebrating the overthrow of Nimeiry on the streets of Khartoum on 6 April 1985.
Date	6 April 1985
Location	Khartoum, Democratic Republic of the Sudan 15°30′2″N 32°33′36″E
Result	Coup attempt succeeds: Overthrow of Gaafar Nimeiry; Establishment of the Transitional Military Council; Fall of the Democratic Republic of Sudan; Restoration of the Republic of Sudan

Belligerents
Democratic Republic of Sudan: Sudanese Socialist Union	(Sudan) SAF coup plotters Democratic Unionist Party; Umma Party; National Islamic Front

Commanders and leaders
Gaafar Nimeiry; Omar al-Tayib	(Sudan) Abdel Rahman Swar al-Dahab
- Location within Sudan.

A coup d'état occurred in Sudan on 6 April 1985 when the high command of the Sudanese Armed Forces, led by Defense Minister and Commander-in-Chief Field Marshal Abdel Rahman Swar al-Dahab, overthrew the government of President Gaafar Nimeiry. The military intervention successfully concluded a massive wave of civil disobedience known as the 1985 April Revolution, effectively ending Nimeiry's 16-year authoritarian rule.

== Background ==
Political and economic discontent against Nimeiry had escalated severely in the early 1980s. Facing a structural debt crisis, the government alienated both domestic secular forces and the international community. In September 1983, Nimeiry declared all of Sudan an Islamic state under a strict interpretation of Sharia law. This maneuver unilaterally abolished the Southern Sudan Autonomous Region and terminated the Addis Ababa Agreement, directly igniting the Second Sudanese Civil War.

The crisis reached a breaking point in March 1985. Under intense pressure from the United States and the International Monetary Fund to implement severe economic austerity measures, the government drastically increased the prices of essential commodities, including food and gasoline. These hikes triggered a spontaneous popular uprising. On 3 April, an alliance of professional syndicates—including doctors, lawyers, and university lecturers—called for massive demonstrations and a general political strike to demand the abolition of the regime. The strike effectively paralyzed the country's governance and economy.

== The coup ==
On 6 April 1985, capitalizing on the civil unrest and the total shutdown of the capital, the Sudanese Armed Forces seized control of the state. At the time of the coup, President Nimeiry was on an official visit to the United States.

The military takeover was relatively bloodless; reportedly, two casualties occurred during a brief shootout as soldiers seized the headquarters of the powerful State Security Organization in Khartoum, which was led by Nimeiry loyalist Omar al-Tayib. Following the securing of the capital, troops heavily guarded the radio studios in Omdurman to broadcast the military's declaration.

In a communique read on national radio, Field Marshal Swar al-Dahab announced the dismissal of Nimeiry and his cabinet. The military suspended the Constitution, dissolved the parliament and the ruling SSU party, and declared a temporary state of emergency. Dahab promised the restoration of democratic freedoms, the opening of direct dialogue with the southern rebels, and committed to returning power to a civilian government within an interim period.

== Aftermath ==
Three days after the coup, the fifteen-man Transitional Military Council was officially established to manage the transition, culminating in the general elections of April 1986.

Following the radio announcement of the military takeover, tens of thousands of citizens poured into the streets of Khartoum to celebrate the fall of the regime, destroying official portraits of Nimeiry across the city.

Unable to return to Sudan, Nimeiry flew from Washington, D.C., and landed in Cairo, Egypt. He was met at Cairo International Airport by President Hosni Mubarak, who successfully dissuaded the deposed leader from attempting to return to Khartoum, citing severe security risks.

Regionally, the ouster of the pro-Western Nimeiry was quickly welcomed by his geopolitical adversaries, notably the Libyan Arab Jamahiriya under Muammar Gaddafi and Ba'athist Syria under President Hafez al-Assad.

Celebrations marking the fall of the Nimeiry regime in Sudan
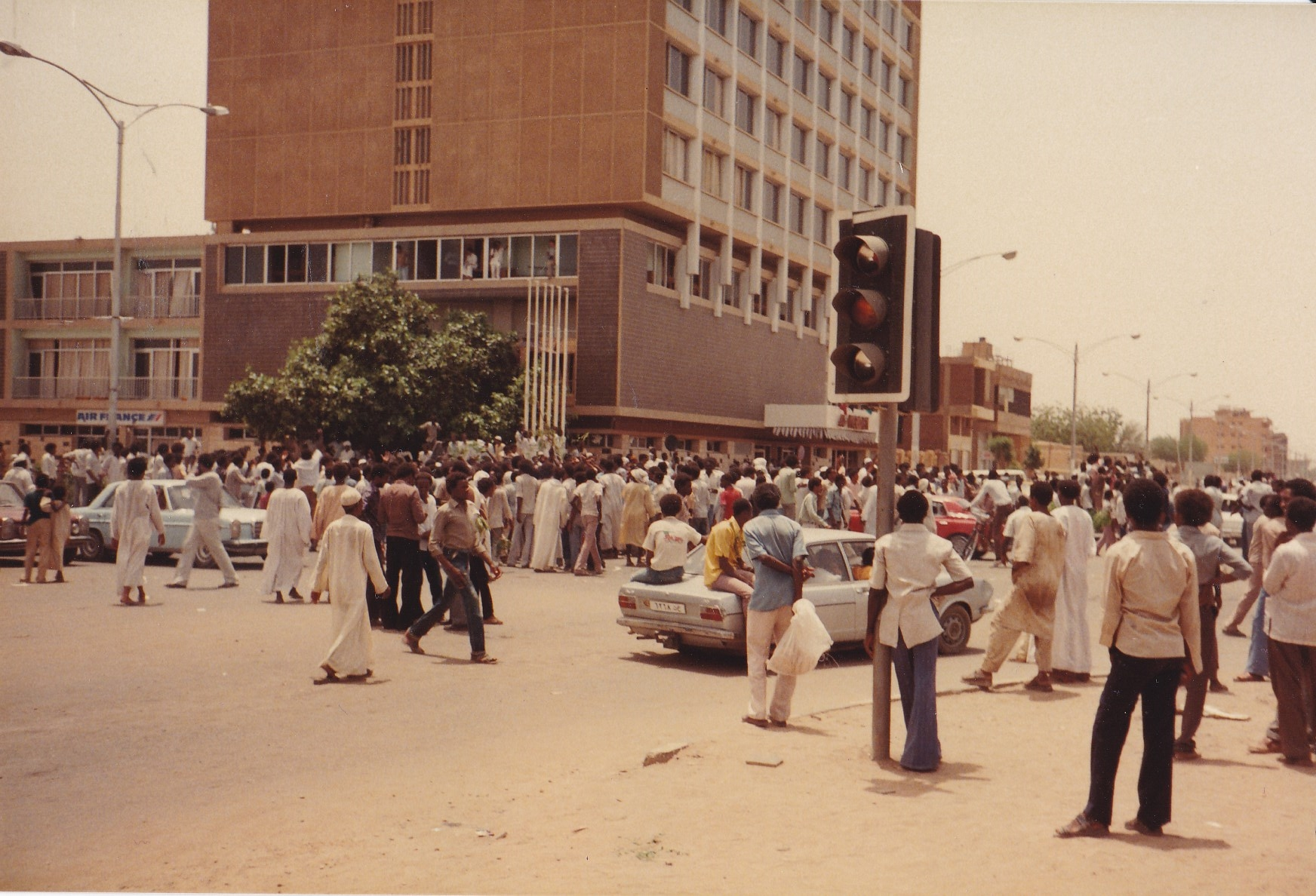
Celebrations outside the Meridian Hotel in central Khartoum.

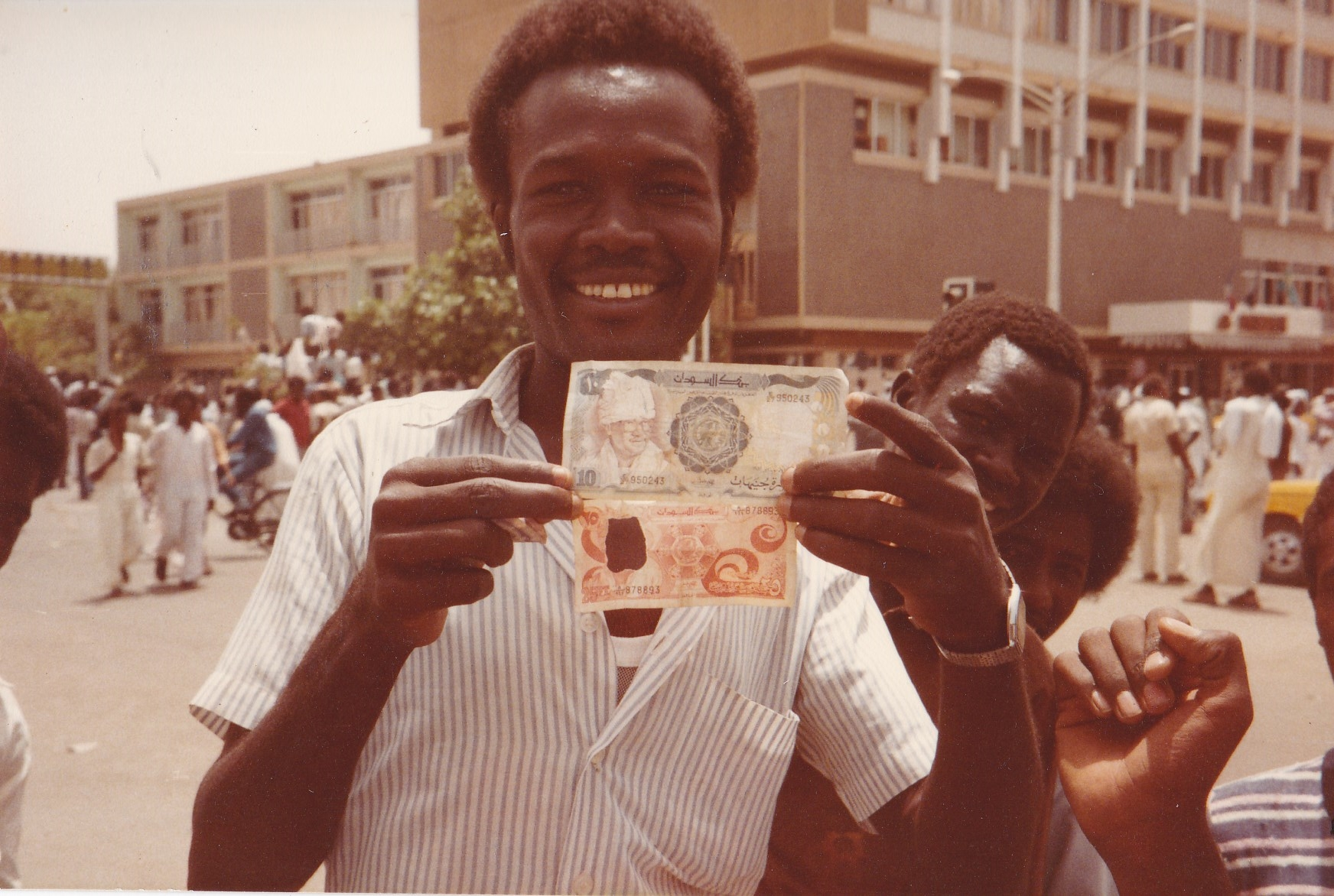
Nimeiry's face removed from a 25pt note.

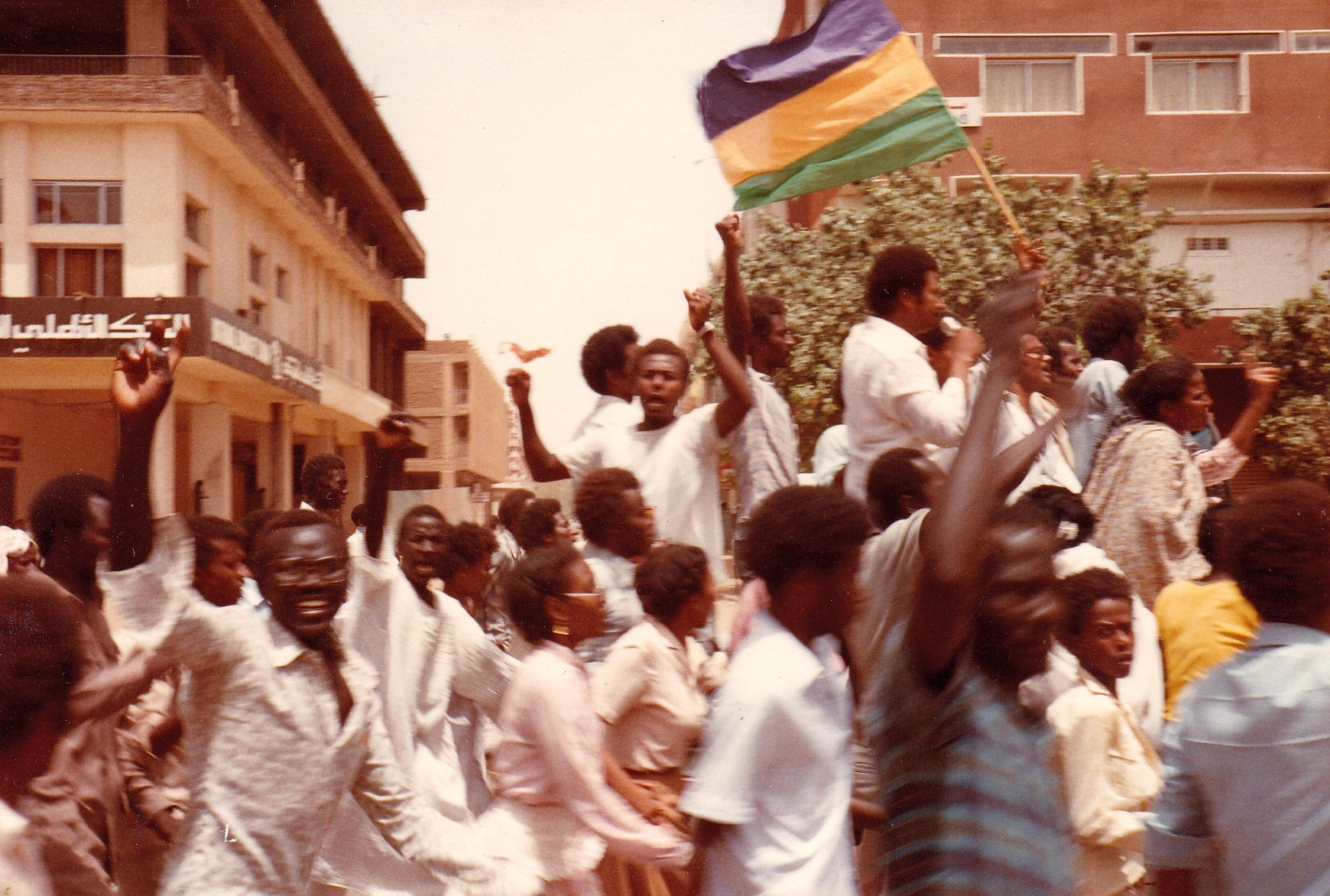
Celebrations featuring the pre-Nimeiry (1969) national flag of Sudan.

== Sources ==
=== Academic sources ===
- Niblock, Tim (1987). Class and power in Sudan: the dynamics of Sudanese politics, 1898–1985. London: Palgrave Macmillan. ISBN 978-1-349-08836-2.
- Shillington, Kevin (2005). Encyclopedia of African history. Vol. 1. New York: Fitzroy Dearborn. ISBN 978-1-57958-245-6.

=== Press sources ===
- Miller, Judith (7 April 1985). "Sudan's president is ousted in coup by military chief". The New York Times.
- The Los Angeles Times (7 April 1985). "Sudan's military ousts Numeiri: Coup climaxes protests; African ally was on way back from U.S." The Los Angeles Times.

== See also ==
- History of Sudan
