= Transitional Military Council (1985) =

1985–1986 military junta ruling Sudan

This article details the period of Transitional Military Council, April 1985 to April 1986, in the history of Sudan. The combination of the south's redivision, the introduction throughout the country of the sharia, the renewed civil war, and growing economic problems eventually contributed to Gaafar Nimeiry's downfall. On April 6, 1985, a group of military officers, led by Lieutenant General Abdel Rahman Swar al-Dahab, overthrew Nimeiry, who took refuge in Egypt.

== Introduction of the TMC ==
Three days after Nimeiri's downfall, Dhahab authorized the creation of a fifteen-man Transitional Military Council (TMC) to rule Sudan. Dhahab was the president of the council, and the vice president of the council was Abdullah Fadl. During its first few weeks in power, the TMC suspended the constitution; dissolved the Sudanese Socialist Union party (SSU), the secret police, and the parliament and regional assemblies; dismissed regional governors and their ministers; and released hundreds of political detainees from Kober Prison. Dhahab also promised to negotiate an end to the southern civil war and to relinquish power to a civilian government in twelve months. The general populace welcomed and supported the new regime. Despite the TMC's energetic beginning, it soon became evident that Dhahab lacked the skills to resolve Sudan's economic problems, restore peace to the south, and establish national unity.

== Problematic decisions ==
By the time Dhahab seized power, Sudan's economy was in shambles. The country's international debt was approximately US$9 billion. Agricultural and industrial projects funded by the International Monetary Fund (IMF) and the World Bank remained in the planning stages. Most factories operated at less than 50 percent of capacity, while agricultural output had dropped by 50 percent since 1960. Moreover, famine threatened vast areas of southern and western Sudan.

The TMC lacked a realistic strategy to resolve these problems. The Dhahab government refused to accept IMF economic austerity measures. As a result, the IMF, which influenced nearly all bilateral and multilateral donors, in February 1986, declared Sudan bankrupt. Efforts to attract a US$6 billion twenty-five-year investment from the Arab Fund for Economic and Social Development failed when Sudan mismanaged an initial US$2.3 billion investment. A rapid expansion of the money supply and the TMC's inability to control prices caused a soaring inflation rate. Although he appealed to forty donor and relief agencies for emergency food shipments, Dhahab was unable to prevent famine from claiming an estimated 400,000 to 500,000 lives. He also failed to end hostilities in the south, which constituted the major drain on Sudan's limited resources.

Shortly after taking power, Dhahab adopted a conciliatory approach toward the south. Among other things, he declared a unilateral cease-fire, called for direct talks with the SPLM, and offered an amnesty to rebel fighters. The TMC recognized the need for special development efforts in the south and proposed a national conference to review the southern problem. However, Dhahab's refusal to repeal the sharia negated these overtures and convinced SPLM leader Garang that the Sudanese government still wanted to subjugate the south.

Despite this gulf, both sides continued to work for a peaceful resolution of the southern problem. In March 1986, the Sudanese government and the SPLM produced the Koka Dam Declaration, which called for a Sudan "free from racism, tribalism, sectarianism and all causes of discrimination and disparity." The declaration also demanded the repeal of the sharia and the opening of a constitutional conference. All major political parties and organizations, with the exception of the Democratic Unionist Party (DUP) and the National Islamic Front (NIF), supported the Koka Dam Declaration. To avoid a confrontation with the DUP and the NIF, Dhahab decided to leave the sharia question to the new civilian government. Meanwhile, the SPLA kept up the military pressure on the Sudanese government, especially in A'aly an-Nyl, Bahr al Ghazal, and Al Istiwai provinces.

=== Lack of consensus ===
The TMC's greatest failure concerned its inability to form a national political consensus. In late April 1985, negotiations between the TMC and the Alliance of Professional and Trade Unions resulted in the establishment of a civilian cabinet under the direction of Al-Jazuli Daf'allah. The cabinet, which was subordinate to the TMC, devoted itself to conducting the government's daily business and to preparing for the election. Although it contained three southerners who belonged to the newly formed Southern Sudanese Political Association, the cabinet failed to win the loyalty of most southerners, who believed the TMC only reflected the policies of the deposed Nimeiri. As a result, Sudan remained a divided nation.

The other factor that prevented the emergence of a national political consensus concerned party factionalism. After sixteen years of one-party rule, most Sudanese favored the revival of the multiparty system. In the aftermath of Nimeiri's overthrow, approximately forty political parties registered with the TMC and announced their intention to participate in national politics. The political parties ranged from those committed to revolutionary socialism to those that supported Islamism. Of these latter, the NIF had succeeded the Islamic Charter Front as the main vehicle for the Muslim Brotherhood's political aspirations. However, policy disagreements over the sharia, the southern civil war, and the country's future direction contributed to the confusion that characterized Sudan's national politics.

== End of the TMC ==
In this troubled atmosphere, Dhahab sanctioned the promised April 1986 general election, which the authorities spread over a twelve-day period and postponed in thirty-seven southern constituencies because of the civil war. The Umma Party, headed by Sadiq al-Mahdi, won ninety-nine seats. The DUP, which was led after the April 1985 uprising by Khatmiyyah leader Muhammad Uthman al Mirghani, gained sixty-four seats. Hassan al-Turabi's NIF obtained fifty-one seats. Regional political parties from the south, the Nuba Mountains, and the Red Sea Hills won lesser numbers of seats. The Sudanese Communist Party (SCP) and other radical parties failed to score any significant victories.

== See also ==
- Transitional Military Council (2019)

== Sources ==
- – Sudan
