= Abdel Rahman Swar al-Dahab =

President of Sudan from 1985 to 1986

Field Marshal Abdel Rahman Suwar al-Dahab
- عبد الرحمن سوار الذهب
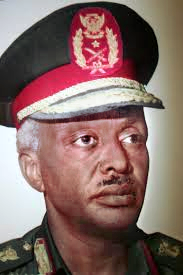
- Suwar al-Dahab in the 1980s

Chairman of the Transitional Military Council
- In office 6 April 1985 – 6 May 1986
- Deputy: Taj el-Deen Abdallah Fadl
- Preceded by: Gaafar Nimeiry as President
- Succeeded by: Ahmad al-Mirghani as Chairman of the Supreme Council

Minister of Defence
- In office 3 March 1985 – 22 April 1985
- Preceded by: Gaafar Nimeiry
- Succeeded by: Othman Abdullah Muhammad

Personal details
- Born: 1 January 1934 Omdurman, Anglo-Egyptian Sudan
- Died: 18 October 2018 (aged 84) Riyadh, Saudi Arabia
- Party: None (military)

Military service
- Allegiance: Republic of Sudan (1958–1969); Democratic Republic of Sudan (1969–1985); Republic of Sudan (1985–1986)
- Branch/service: Sudanese Army
- Years of service: 1958–1986
- Rank: Field marshal
- Battles/wars: First Sudanese Civil War; Second Sudanese Civil War

Abdel Rahman Suwar al-Dahab (otherwise known as Suwar al-Dahab or al-Dahab; 1 January 1934 – 18 October 2018) (Arabic: عبد الرحمن سوار الذهب) was a Sudanese military officer who served as the Head of State of Sudan from 6 April 1985, to 6 May 1986.

His full name has also been listed by the Sudanese Ministry of Defence as Abdul Rahman Muhammad Hassan Swar Al Thahab.

== Biography ==
Suwar-Eldahab was born in 1934 in Omdurman, Sudan. He graduated from the Sudanese Military Academy, later attending military education courses in the United Kingdom, the United States, Egypt, and Jordan. He became a prominent figure when President Gaafar Nimeiry appointed him Chief of Staff, and then Minister of Defence and general commander of the armed forces in 1984.

In 1985, he launched a coup ousting President Gaafar Nimeiry leading to him becoming the Chairman of the Transitional Military Council. Following elections, he surrendered power to the government of head of state Ahmed al-Mirghani and prime minister Sadiq al-Mahdi in 1986.

In 1987, he became Chairman of the Islamic Call Organization.

In 2004, he received the King Faisal International Prize for his service to Islam. He died on 18 October 2018 in Riyadh, Saudi Arabia of natural causes.

== In literature and the arts ==
- Dave Eggers's 2006 novel “What is the What” recounts his use of Arab militia, notably the Baggara, in the origins of the Second Sudanese Civil War.
