= Sudanese Socialist Union =

1971–1985 ruling party of Sudan

Sudanese Socialist Union الاتحاد الاشتراكي السوداني
- Abbreviation: SSU
- Leader: Gaafar Nimeiry
- Founded: 25 May 1971 (55 years, 118 days)
- Dissolved: 6 April 1985 (41 years, 167 days)
- Ideology: Arab nationalism Arab socialism Pan-Arabism; Nasserism; Authoritarianism; Militarism; Anti-communism (from July 1971); Islamism (from September 1983)

Party flag

The Sudanese Socialist Union (abbr. SSU; Arabic: الاتحاد الاشتراكي السوداني, romanized: Al-Ittihad Al-Ishtiraki As-Sudaniy) was a political party in Sudan. The SSU was the country's sole legal party from 1971 until 1985, when the regime of President Gaafar Nimeiry was overthrown in a military coup.

Today the Sudanese Socialist Democratic Union (SSDU), the successor party to the SSU, exists as a registered political party in Sudan. Until 2018, it was led by Professor Dr. Fatima Abdel Mahmoud, who was Sudan's first female minister during the presidency of Gaafar Nimeiry as well as a former member of the National Congress Party. Professor Dr. Fatima Abdel Mahmoud was the first woman to contest the presidency of Sudan in the 2010 general election.

== Electoral history ==
=== Presidential elections ===
Election	Candidate	Votes	%	Result
1971 (referendum)	Gaafar Nimeiry	3,839,374	98.6%	Elected ✓
1977	Gaafar Nimeiry	5,624,128	99.1%	Elected ✓
1983	Gaafar Nimeiry		99.6%	Elected ✓

=== National Assembly elections ===
Election	Leader	Seats	+/–	Position	Result
1978	Gaafar Nimeiry	274 / 304	New	New	Sole legal party
1980	Gaafar Nimeiry	332 / 368	▲58	1st	Sole legal party
1981–82	Gaafar Nimeiry	138 / 151	▼194	1st	Sole legal party

== See also ==
- National Islamic Front
- National Congress Party
- Sudan People's Liberation Movement
- 1969 Sudanese coup d'état
- 1971 Sudanese coup d'état
