= Education in Khartoum =

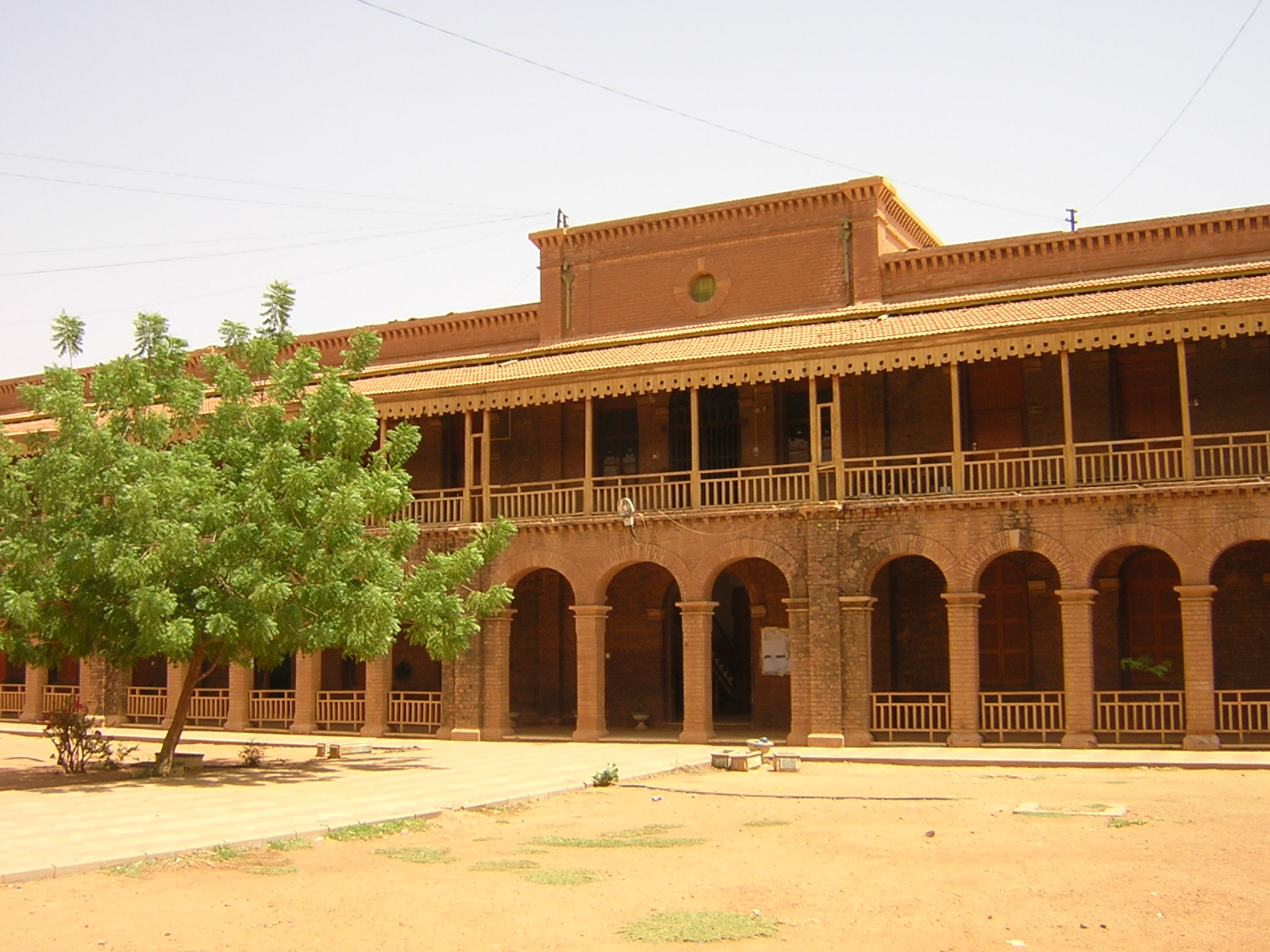
The University of Khartoum

Khartoum is the main location for most of Sudan's top educational bodies. There are four main levels of education:

1. Kindergarten and day-care. It begins in the age of 3–4, consists of 1-2 grades, (depending on the parents).
2. Elementary school. The first grade pupils enter at the age of 6–7. It consists of 8 grades, each year there is more academic efforts and main subjects added plus more school methods improvements. By the 8th grade a student is 13–14 years old ready to take the certificate exams and entering high school.
3. Upper second school and high school. At this level the school methods add some main academic subjects such as chemistry, biology, physics, and geography. There are three grades in this level. The students' ages are about 14–15 to 17–18.
4. Higher education. There are many universities in Sudan such as the university of Khartoum. Some foreigners attend universities there, as the reputation of the universities are very good and the living expenses are low compared to other countries.

The education system in Sudan went through many changes in the late 1980s and early 1990s.

== High schools ==
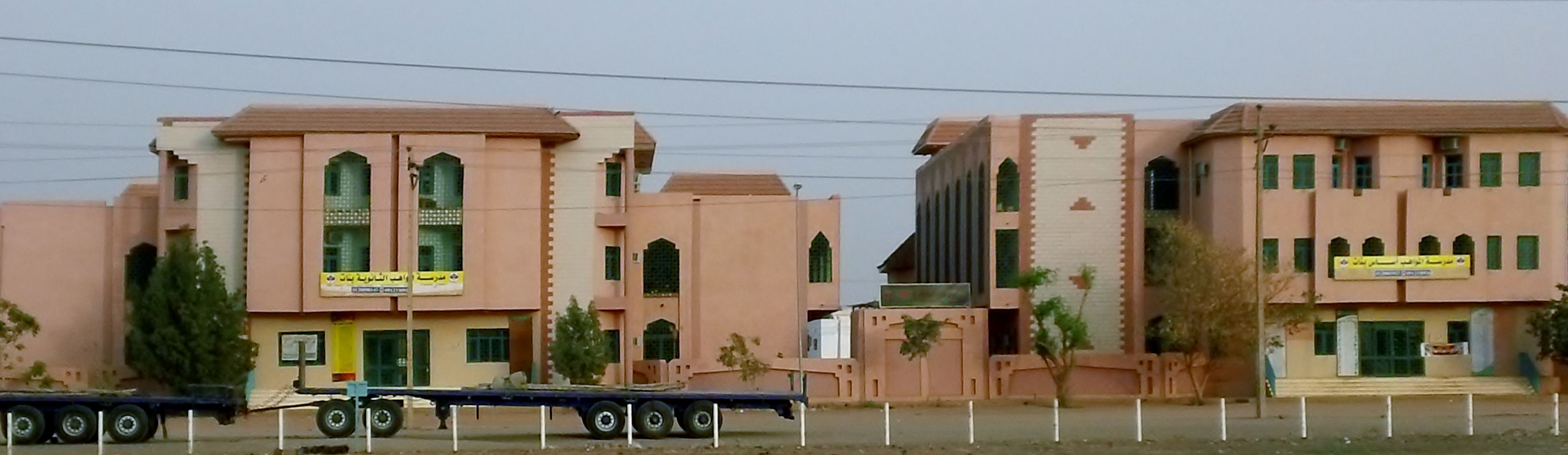
Al-Mawahib Schools - Khartoum Bahry

- Khartoum Old High Secondary School for Boys
- Khartoum Old High Secondary School for Girls
- The British Educational Schools (BES)
- Khartoum American School, KAS, established in 1957.
- Khartoum International Community School, KICS, established in 2004.
- Unity High School.
- Suliman Hussein Academy
- Comboni and St. Francis, Khartoum new high secondary school for boys
- Khartoum International preparatory school (KIPS)|Khartoum International preparatory school, established in 1928.
- Qabbas Private International Schools
- Kibeida International Schools
- Riad English School, established 1987
- Nile Valley School, founded 2012
- Mohamed Hussein High Secondary School for Boys in Omdurman

== Universities and higher institutes in Khartoum ==
Higher institutes in Khartoum
Educational institution	Type	Website
University of Khartoum Founded as Gordon Memorial College in 1902, it was later renamed to share the name of the city in the 1930s	Public university	https://web.archive.org/web/20180711215331/http://www.uofk.edu/
Academy of Engineering Sciences founded as Academy of Electrical Engineering in 2002	Private university	https://web.archive.org/web/20181011004131/http://www.aes.edu.sd/
Al-Neelain University	Public university	http://www.neelain.edu.sd
Al Zaiem Alazhari University	Public university	https://web.archive.org/web/20150405095256/http://www.aau.edu.sd/
Bahri University, formally Juba University before the separation and Juba University returned to the South	Public university	
Omdurman Islamic University,	Public university	
International University of Africa	Public university	https://web.archive.org/web/20170717050156/http://www.iua.edu.sd/
Nile Valley University	Public university	
Open University of Sudan	Public university	http://www.ous.edu.sd
Public Health Institute, post-graduate institution operated by the Ministry of Health	Public university	http://www.phi.edu.sd
Sudan University of Science and Technology, one of the leading engineering and technology schools in Sudan, founded in 1932 as Khartoum Technical Institute and has been given its present name in 1991	Public university	http://www.sustech.edu
AlMughtaribeen University	Private university	https://web.archive.org/web/20191221175123/http://www.mu.edu.sd/
Bayan College for Science & Technology	Private university	https://web.archive.org/web/20110920215435/http://www.bayantech.edu/
Canadian Sudanese College	Private university	http://www.ccs.edu.sd
Comboni College for Science and Technology	Private universities	http://www.combonikhartoum.com
Future University of Sudan, the first specialized university for ICT inter-related studies in Sudan, founded by Dr. Abubaker Mustafa.	Private universities	http://www.futureu.edu.sd
National College for Medical & Technical Studies	Private university	https://web.archive.org/web/20131203001023/http://www.nc.edu.sd/
National Ribat University	Private university	https://web.archive.org/web/20160411212315/http://ribat.edu.sd/
University of Medical Sciences and Technology (UMST) founded in 1996 by Prof. Mamoun Humaida as Academy of Medical Science & Technology	Private universities	
Omdurman Al-ahlia University	Private university founded in 1985	

== See also ==
- Education in Sudan
