= List of universities in Sudan =

This is a list of universities in Sudan.

Institution	Location	Ownership
Academy of Engineering Sciences	Khartoum	Private
Ahfad University for Women	Omdurman	Private
Al Fajr college for science and technology	Khartoum	Private
Al Fashir University	El Fasher	Public
AlMughtaribeen University	Khartoum	Private
Al-Neelain University	Khartoum and other locations	Public
Al Zaiem Alazhari University	Khartoum	Public
Bayan College for Science & Technology	Khartoum	Private
Blue Nile University	Ad-Damazeen	Public
Cambridge International College	Khartoum	Private
Canadian Sudanese College	Khartoum	Private
Dalanj University	Dalang	Public
El Imam El Mahdi University	Kosti	Public
Elnasr Technical college	Omdurman	Private
Elobied college for science and Technology	Al-Ubayyid	Private
Elrazi University	Khartoum	Private
Future University of Sudan	Khartoum	Private
University of Garden City	Khartoum	Private
Gezira College for Technology	Khartoum	Private
Hayatt university College	Khartoum	Private
Ibn Sina University	Khartoum	Private
International University of Africa	Khartoum	Public
Karary University	Omdurman	Public
Khartoum College of Medical Sciences	Khartoum	Private
Mashreq University	Khartoum North	Private
Nahda College	Khartoum	Private
Napata College	Khartoum	Private
National College of Khartoum (NCK)	Khartoum	Private
National College for Medical & Technical Studies	Khartoum	Private
National Ribat University	Khartoum	Private
Nile University Sudan	Bahri	Private
Nile Valley University	Atbara	Public
Nobles College for science and technology	Khartoum	Private
Omdurman Ahlia University	Omdurman	Private
Omdurman Islamic University	Omdurman	Public
Open University of Sudan	Khartoum	Public
Peace University College for Languages and Translation		
Public Health Institute	Khartoum	Public
Red Sea University	Port Sudan	Public
Riyadh International College	Khartoum	Private
Sudan International University	Khartoum	Private
Sharq El Neal College	Khartoum	Private
Sudan University of Science and Technology	Khartoum and other locations	Public
University of Albutana	Rufaa	Public
University of Bakht Al-Ruda	Al-Dewaym	Public
University of Bahri	Bahri	Public
University of Dongola	Dongola	Public
California Institute of Technology Extension	Springfield Heights Heights	Public
University of Gezira	Wad Medani	Public
University of Kassala	Kassala	Public
University of Khartoum	Khartoum	Public
University of Kordofan	Al-Ubayyid	Public
University of Medical Sciences and Technology	Khartoum	Private
University of Nyala	Nyala	Public
University of Science and Technology - Omdurman	Omdurman	Private
University of Sennar	Sennar	Public
University of Shendi	Shendi	Public
University of the Holy Quran and Islamic Sciences	Omdurman	Public
University of West Kordofan	Al-Foula	Public
University of Zalingei	Zalingei	Public
Wad Medani Ahlia College	Wad Medani	Non-profit

== Sources ==
- "Sudanese higher education". Ministry of Higher Education & Scientific Research.
- "A-Z Universities in Sudan". uniRank. Archived from the original on 2017-08-08.
- "Sudan academic institutions Directory". University Directory.
- "Universities of Sudan". Consejo Superior de Investigaciones Científicas. Archived from the original on 2012-03-19.
- "Sudanese higher education". Elobied College of Science and Technology.
