= University of Kassala =

University in Sudan

- جامعة كسلا
- University of Kassala logo
- Former names: University of East
- Type: Public Research University
- Established: 1990; 36 years ago
- Academic affiliations: AArU
- Academic staff: 700
- Students: 8,700
- Location: Kassala, Sudan; 15°27′29″N 36°24′14″E
- Campus: Public
- Website: kassalauni.edu.sd/en/

University of Kassala (in Arabic جامعة كسلا, Jām'iat Kassala). A public university located in Kassala, Sudan it was established to provide higher education services to the people of eastern Sudan in the field of engineering, medicine, education, computer science, economy, accounting and management. The university was established by Republican Decree No. (67), according to which the University of the East was divided into three universities: University of Kassala, University of Gadarif and Red Sea University.

== Colleges ==
Medicine and Health, Engineering, Computer Science and IT, Economics and Administrative Sciences, Education, Agriculture and Natural Resources, Islamic Studies, Science, Law, Animal production sciences and technology, Community Development.

== Research centers ==
Eastern Sudan Heritage and Languages Research Center, Medical Research Center, and IT Research Center.

== See also ==
- Education in Sudan
- List of universities in Sudan
