= Khartoum College of Medical Sciences =

Khartoum College of Medical Sciences is a medical school, in Khartoum, the capital of Sudan. It was established in 1999 (26 years ago) with three faculties: Medicine, Dentistry, and Clinical Pharmacy. At the second national higher education exhibition, the college was awarded the trophy for the best-equipped higher education institution in Sudan. The college started 3 more programs in the following years: Medical Laboratory Technology, Physiotherapy, and Dental Technology The institution was founded in 1999 by Professor Nasr Al-adeen, who died in 2021.

== See also ==
- List of universities in Sudan
- Education in Sudan
