= Academy of Engineering Sciences =

Academy of Engineering Sciences might refer to:

- Academy of Engineering Sciences (Sudan)
- Royal Swedish Academy of Engineering Sciences
