= Sudan International University =

Education organization in Khartoum, Sudan

- جامعة السودان العالميه
- Type: Private
- Established: 1990; 35 years ago
- Vice-Chancellor: Professor Bakri Osman Saeed
- Academic staff: (Permanent staff)
- Location: Khartoum State, Sudan
- Campuses: 2
- Website: www.siu-sd.com

Sudan International University (SIU), is a private university founded in 1990, and located in Khartoum, Sudan. The university has been accredited by the Sudan Ministry of Higher Education and Scientific Research.

== History ==
Founded in 1990s and it has more than 20 college

== Schools and colleges ==
- Faculty of Medicine
- Faculty of Dentistry
- Faculty of Pharmacy
- Faculty of Nursing
- Faculty of Medical Laboratory Sciences
- Faculty of Engineering

The college awards a bachelor's degree in the following majors:- Medical Engineering - Electronic Engineering - Network and Communication Engineering - Computer Systems Engineering - Civil Engineering - Electrical Engineering (Power Systems - Control Systems) - Architecture Engineering - Mechatronics Engineering - Mechanical Engineering

- Faculty of Computing and Information Systems
- Faculty of Management Sciences
- Faculty of Economics, Financial and Banking Studies
- Faculty of Tourism & Hotel Management
- Sudan International Language Center (SILC)
- Department of Quality Assurance and Self-Evaluation

== Libraries ==
The university has one big library that contains approximately 6000 books from various interests of the humanities, medical and health sciences that help students to obtain information in an easy and comfortable way. The university also has an electronic library with computers that has access to internet.

== Campuses ==
The buildings of Sudan International University are located in the state of Khartoum, where the buildings are distributed in the cities of Arquette and Al-Azhari. City of Al-Azhari has the Medical and Engineering Complex, where the buildings of Arquette include the Faculties of Tourism and Hotel and the Faculties of Computer Science and Economics, etc.

== Accreditation ==
Sudan Ministry of Higher Education and Scientific Research currently provides accreditation to the university.

== See also ==
- Education in Sudan
- List of universities in Sudan
