= Nahda College =

Educational institution in Khartoum, Sudan

Coordinates: 15.5443°N 32.5434°E

- كلية النهضة
- Type: Private
- Established: 2014; 12 years ago
- Location: Khartoum, Khartoum, Sudan
- Website: nahda.edu.sd

Nahda College is an educational institution founded in 2014 and based in the city of Khartoum, Sudan.

== See also ==
- List of universities in Sudan
- Education in Sudan
