= Public Health Institute, Sudan =

Research institute in Khartum, Sudan

- معهد الصحة العامة
- Type: Public
- Established: 2009; 17 years ago
- Location: Khartoum, Sudan
- Website: www.phi.edu.sd

The Public Health Institute (PHI) is a training and research institute run by the Federal Ministry of Health of Sudan. Training programs are Master of Family Medicine, Master of Public Health In-service Program, Master in disaster management and Master of Public Health. The institute has 25 full-time employees and over 50 part-time employees and associates. It is a member of the International Association of National Public Health Institutes.

== See also ==
- Education in Sudan
- List of universities in Sudan
