= National University - Sudan =

University in Khartoum, Sudan

- الجامعة الوطنية - السودان
- Former names: National College for Medical and Technical Studies (2005-2014)
- Type: Private
- Established: 2005; 21 years ago
- President: Qurashi M. Ali
- Location: Khartoum, Khartoum, Sudan; 15.5264°N 32.5889°E
- Website: www.nu.edu.sd

The National University - Sudan is an educational institution based in the city of Khartoum, Sudan. As of September 2011, the university was a member of the Association of African Universities.

In 2005 NUSU started as a college (National College for Medical and Technical Studies). The MHESR approved the start with 4 bachelor programmes (medicine, pharmacy, physiotherapy and health informatics) and 3-year diploma of physiotherapy.

In 2006 the college added bachelor programmes of Dentistry and Radiography.

In 2008, the college added bachelor of nursing and midwifery, medical laboratory technology, and administrative studies (business administration, accounting, marketing and management information systems).

In 2009 the college became the first and the only ISO-9001-2008 certified higher education institution in Sudan, for its quality management of academic programmes.

In 2014 after graduation of 5 batches, and satisfying MHESR requirements, it applied for upgrade and promoted to university, after only 9 years. This was a record in the Sudan, because most colleges take about 15-20 years.

In 2016, NUSU added the Faculty of International Relations and Diplomatic Studies, and the Faculty of Engineering (civil, architecture and electrical and electronic degrees).

== Ownership ==
From 2005 to 2014, it was owned by a private limited company, paid for and supported by a number of academicians and physicians.

In 2014, ownership changed to an IPO, for more transparent managerial and financial control by the Sudan Stock Market, and allow the interested members of the public to invest and add their vision.

In 2016 NUSU has been accredited by the British Accreditation Council (BAC) for 3 years, as an international centre, as the first and only higher education institution to attempt international accreditation.

== Membership ==
In 2008, NUSU became a member of the Union of Arab Universities (Amman, Jordan).

In 2011, it became a member of the Association of African Universities (Accra, Ghana).

In 2013, it became a member of the International Association of Universities (UNESCO, Paris, France).

== Accreditation ==
Colleges in the Sudan cannot intake students before being approved by the MHESR, so certificates are readily authenticated graduates are recognized nationally and mutually in all other countries, for work and graduate education.

The paramedical graduates from the faculties of radiography, physiotherapy, nursing, medical laboratory technology are registrable in the National Council for Medical and Health Specialties for authentication and recognition. Graduates of these programmes are all over the world.

== See also ==
- List of universities in Sudan
- Education in Sudan
