= The Future University (Sudan) =

University in Sudan

Future University
- جامعة المستقبل Jāmiʿat al-Mustaqbal
- Former names: Computer Man College, (CMC)
- Motto: Developing The Future
- Type: Private
- Established: 1991; 35 years ago August 2010; 15 years ago (upgraded to university)
- Academic affiliations: UNESCO Cousteau Society; Brazilian Space Agency; Association of Arab Universities, Jordan EDUFRANCE, Paris
- Chairman: Abubaker Mustafa
- President: al-Tayeb Mustafa
- Location: Khartoum, Sudan; 15.548754°N 32.554078°E
- Campus: Urban
- Colors
- Website: www.fu.edu.sd

Future University (FU) (Arabic: جامعة المستقبل), formerly known as Computer Man College (Arabic: كلية كمبيوترمان) or (CMC), is an Information and communications technology university in Sudan. It was established in 1991 as the first college to introduce an Information Technology program in the country. It was also one of the first to introduce Computer Engineering, Telecommunication Engineering and Architecture & Design programs. It was upgraded to a university in August 2010 by the Sudanese Ministry of Higher Education and Scientific Research. The university adopts the credit hours system in its education process. Currently, the university contains seven faculties, each offering several programs.

== History ==
=== About the founder ===
Dr. Abubaker Mustafa Mohammed Khair, the founder and chairman of the Board of Trustees of The Future University, received a B.Sc. in Electrical Engineering, Computer Engineering Communication (University of Belgrade, 1970), M.Sc. in Computer Technology, Computer Systems (American University), Applied Science in Engineering, (George Washington University, 1975), and a Ph.D. in Management of Information Systems (George Washington University).

=== First years ===
Former CMC logo.

The foundation of the college is a result of a rise in the field of information technology reflected in the administrative and economical structure of Sudan and other countries. New concepts were created, such as globalization, knowledge societies, e-commerce and e-government.

During this era, the college embarked on strategic plans to offer three programs: Information Technology, Computer Engineering and Computer Science, and then introduce the Telecommunication Engineering and Architecture & Design programs.

=== From CMC to FU ===
Upgrading Computer Man College into the new Future University by constructing a new campus to modernize buildings almost 20 years old, was requested from the Sudan Ministry of Higher Education and Scientific Research three times, beginning 15 years ago.

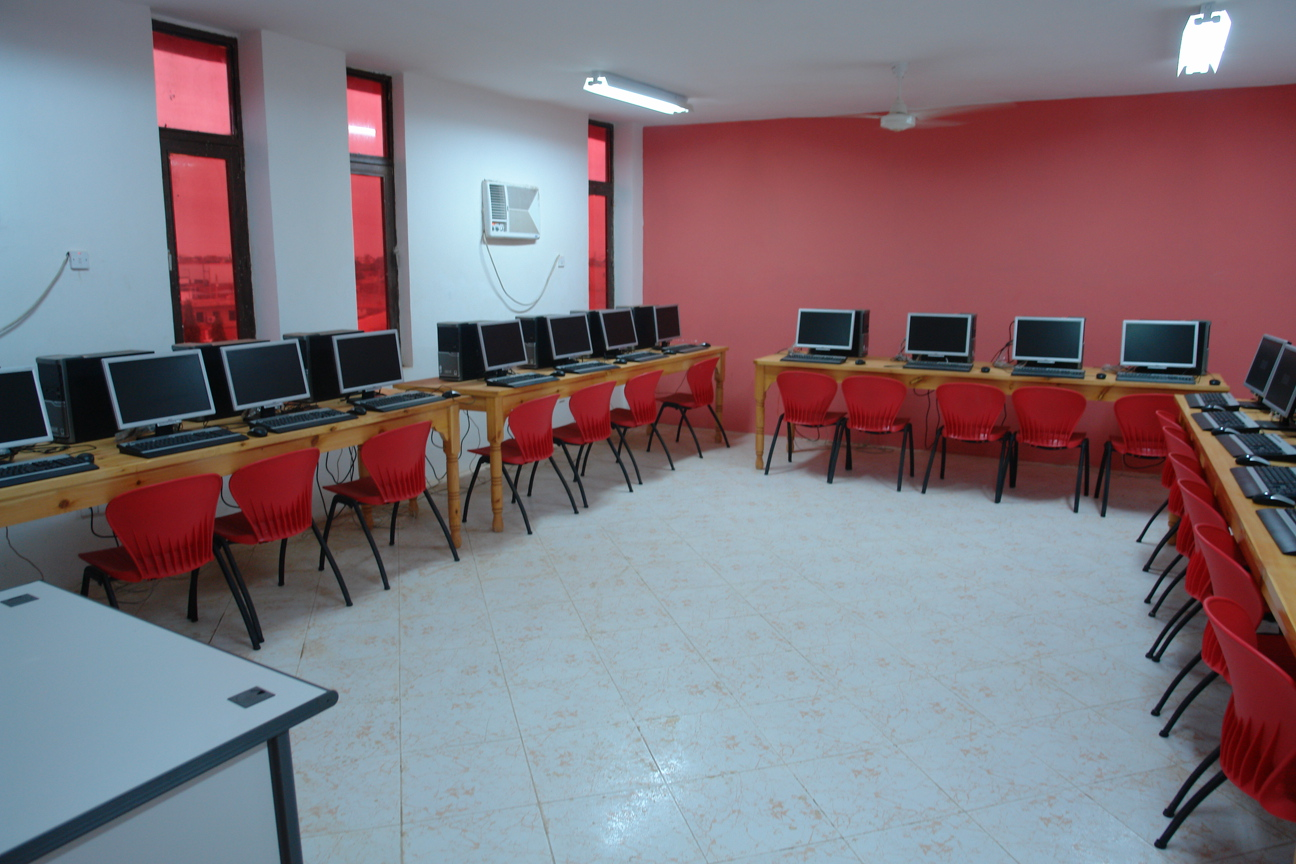
A PC lab in The Future University.

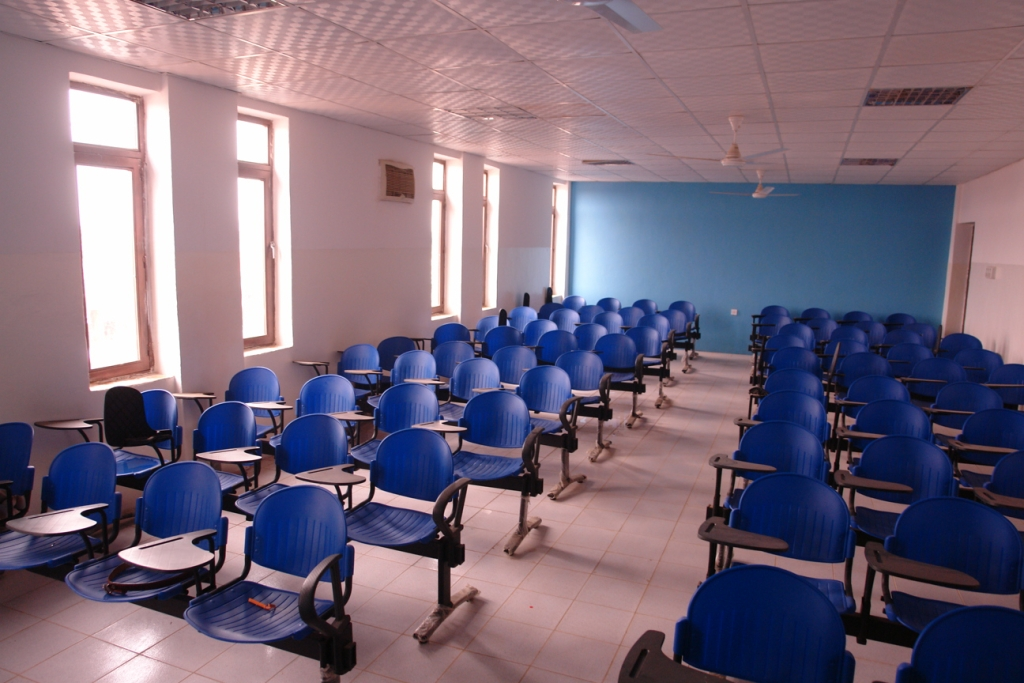
A lecture room in The Future University.

It was eventually approved in 2010. On the morning of the day after the approval, many of the students reported that they were surprised when they came to the college because they saw the new sign at the forefront of the buildings saying “Future University” instead of the old “Computer Man College.” On that day, a camel and a number of sheep were sacrificed (i.e. slaughtered) inside the campus, and the meat was given away as charity (Karāma) to the poor and other people in the shape of a good-deed attempt to thank the grace of God that the college was upgraded.

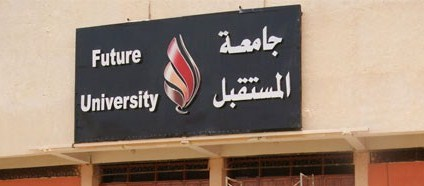
The Future University sign at the campus's main entrance.

== Faculties ==
- Faculty of Information Technology, offering 10-semester B.Sc.degree programs in Information Technology, Knowledge Management, Knowledge Engineering, Digital Marketing and Digital Banking, and a six-semester Diploma program in Information Technology.
- Faculty of Computer Science, with B.Sc.degree programs in Computer Science, Artificial Intelligence, and Bio-Informatics, and a Diploma program in Telecommunication Engineering.
- Faculty of Telecommunication and Space Technology, with B.Sc.degree in Telecommunication Engineering and Satellite Engineering.
- Faculty of Engineering, with B.Sc.degree programs in Computer Engineering, Electronics Engineering, Bio-Medical Engineering, Laser Engineering, and Mechatronics Engineering, and Diploma programs in Computer Engineering, Electronics Engineering, and Network Engineering .
- Faculty of Architecture, with B.Sc.degree programs in Architecture & Design .
- Faculty of Geo-Informatics, with B.Sc.degree programs in Geo-Informatics and Remote Sensing.
- Faculty of Arts and Design, offering B.Sc.degree programs in Interior Design and Graphic Design and Creative Multimedia .

There are also Diploma programs in E-Commerce Technology, Commerce & Accounting Information Technology, Internet Design Technology, and one-semester certificate programs for Additional & Continuing Education and International Computer Driving License.

== Centers of Excellence ==
- Space Technology Center
- FU Alumni
- UNESCO/Cousteau Ecotechnie Chair
- Centre for E-Learning and Software Development (CESD)

== Logo ==
The current logo of Future University was the winning logo in a contest the university held among the students and staff

== Additions ==
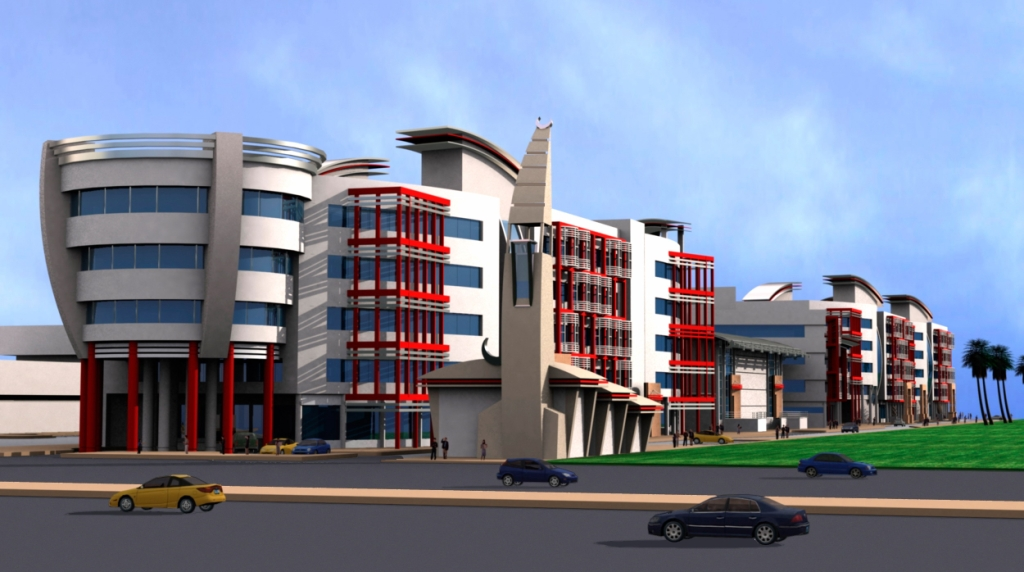

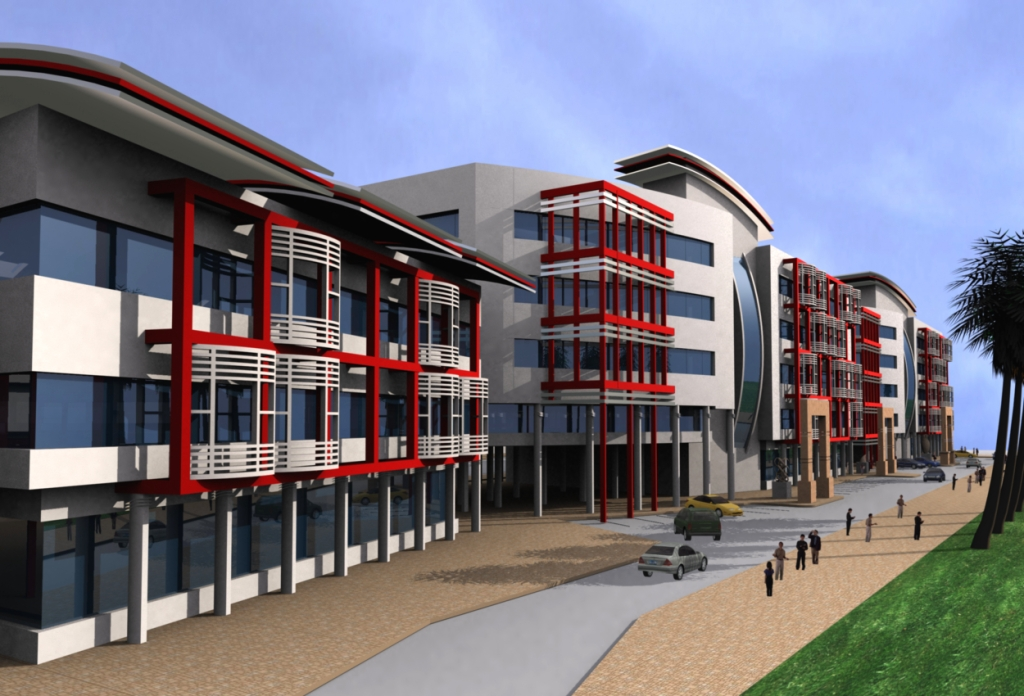

The university has recently started building its new campus located side by side with the old and current buildings. It is planned to contain modern lecture rooms, labs, auditorium and libraries, and accommodate about 18,000 students. In 2006, the land of the new campus was procured by the college, an area of 20,000 square meters. The cost of construction, equipment, and furnishing the new buildings of the campus was approximately US$60 million. Construction was paused several times for unclear reasons. The chairman of the board stated in an interview that he believes the new buildings would be completely constructed, set up, and ready to use by the end of 2011. As of early 2017, it still was not constructed and remains in the foundation phase.

== See also ==
- List of universities in Sudan
- List of universities in Africa
- Education in Sudan
- Sudanese Universities Information Network
- Association of Sudanese Universities
