= 2025 East Sudan drone attacks =

2025 event in the Sudanese civil war

- Part of Sudanese civil war (2023-present)
- Location: Kassala and Port Sudan
- Target: Kassala Airport, the Port Sudan New International Airport, and fuel depots in Port Sudan
- Date: 3 - 9 May, 2025
- Executed by: Rapid Support Forces
- Outcome: Attacks repelled

In the beginning of May 2025, the Rapid Support Forces waged drone attacks in Kassala and Port Sudan for the first time.

== Background ==
On 15 April 2023, the SAF and RSF began attacks throughout the country, making the country's third civil war. During the Sudanese civil war (2023-present), the states of Kassala and Red Sea have never been part of the war and have been considered safe, excluding the attempted assassination of Burhan in Jubayt.

== Drone attacks ==
On 3 May 2025, the RSF used three drones to attack the airport in Kassala. The attack targeted a fuel tank. No specific damage or casualties were mentioned. Later that day, the RSF waged an attack on the international airport in Port Sudan with 11 drones. The attack targeted an airbase, civilian facilities, and a goods warehouse. Flights were closed that day until 5:00PM. The attacks aim to destroy infrastructure across the country that are controlled by the Sudanese government.

Spokesperson Nabil Abdallah said on 4 May, 2025, "The RSF targeted the Osman Digna airbase, a goods warehouse, and some civilian facilities in the city of Port Sudan with suicide drones." He also had said there was "limited damage." Commander of the Red Sea Mahjoub Bushra told Sudan's news agency the assault lasted 3 and a half hours with eleven suicide drones.

On 5 May, the RSF started its second wave of drone attacks, suspending flights again. Smoke was seen by the strikes.

On 6 May, a third wave of drones attacked areas around the city of Port Sudan and its airport. A drone reportedly targeted and struck a fuel depot on the airport grounds, resulting in an explosion and fire. Explosions were also reported near the Marina Hotel and the Flamingo military base in the center and north of the city respectively.

A fourth wave of drones attacked the city on 7 May, with explosions being heard. The SAF claimed that these explosions were caused by the drones being downed by anti-aircraft missiles.

On 9 May, The SAF repelled a sixth wave of drone attacks targeting Port Sudan's Flamingo base. The army also claimed to have engaged in drones flying over Port Sudan and Rabak the previous night on 8 May.

== Responses ==
Sudan: Sudan severed diplomatic ties with the UAE after Sudanese Defense Minister, Yassin Ibrahim, accused them of violating the country's sovereignty through their "proxy", the RSF. The Foreign Ministry later accused the UAE of being directly involved in the attacks.

=== International ===
Egypt: Egypt had strongly condemned the attacks by the RSF on infrastructure in Kassala and Port Sudan.

United Arab Emirates: The UAE's Ministry of Foreign Affairs stated that the country "condemned in the strongest terms the targeting of vital civilian facilities and critical infrastructure in Port Sudan and Kassala, denouncing such acts as a blatant violation of international humanitarian law." The Ministry reaffirmed the UAE's unwavering position in calling for an immediate ceasefire, the protection of civilians and civilian infrastructure, and a peaceful resolution to the conflict.

Iran: Spokesperson for Iran's foreign affairs ministry, Esmail Baqaei, condemned the attacks on the airports and civilian facilities in Port Sudan and was expressed his concern for continuing drone strikes. He called for an end to stop attacks on civilians.

Kuwait: The Kuwaiti Foreign Ministry of Affairs condemned and denounced the attacks on civilian facilities in Kassala and Port Sudan.

Saudi Arabia: The Saudi Ministry of Foreign Affairs condemned and strongly denounced the attacks on vital civilian facilities in Kassala and Port Sudan, stating that such actions threaten regional stability and Arab national security.

Qatar: The Qatari Ministry of Foreign Affairs condemned and strongly denounced the targeting of vital civilian facilities and infrastructure in Kassala and Port Sudan, considering it a violation of international laws and a serious threat to regional security.

Jordan: The Jordanian Foreign Ministry condemned attacks targeting vital facilities and civilian infrastructure in the Sudanese cities of Port Sudan and Kassala. In a statement, the ministry described the attacks as a violation of international humanitarian law and an alarming escalation that threatens regional security and stability.[1]

Netherlands: The Netherlands Embassy in Sudan echoed the EU's stance, calling the targeting of civilian infrastructure a “dangerous escalation that endangers displaced Sudanese civilians and international staff.” The embassy also stated the attacks were “backed by external supporters,” adding that the strikes violate international humanitarian law and undermine peace and stability efforts in Sudan.
