= University of the Holy Quran and Islamic Sciences =

State university in Omdurman, Khartoum, Sudan

- جامعة القرآن الكريم والعلوم الإسلامية
- Type: Public
- Established: 1990; 36 years ago
- Chancellor: Ebrahim Norin Ebrahim
- Location: Omdurman, Khartoum State, Sudan; 15.6343°N 32.4914°E
- Website: qunv.net23.net/en/

The University of the Holy Quran and Islamic Sciences is a university in the state of Khartoum, Sudan. It is based in Omdurman.

== History ==
The University of Holy Quran and Islamic Sciences was established in 1990. The new university combined the existing Holy Quran College, established in 1981, and the Omdurman Higher Institute, established in 1983. The Omdurman Higher Institute consisted of the Sharia College, Arabic Language College and Girls' College. The university is government-owned, funded by the Ministry of Higher Education and Scientific Research.

== Programs ==
The university teaches Quran, the Sunnah of the Prophet, the Arabic language and principles of religion and community life. Students learn the heritage of Arabic and Islamic civilization. Colleges are the College of the Holy Quran, Faculty of Sharia, Faculty of Arabic Language, Faculty of Da'wa and Media, Economics and Administrative Sciences, Social Sciences, Education, School of Languages, Graduate Studies and Community College. Although based in Omdurman, the university has faculties in all the states of Sudan.

== Affiliations ==
The university belongs to the Union of Arab Universities, the Union of African Universities and Union of Islamic Universities, and cooperates with the Islamic Organization for Culture, Education and Sciences. It is also a member of the Federation of the Universities of the Islamic World.

== See also ==
- List of Islamic educational institutions
- Education in Sudan
