= El Imam El Mahdi University =

University in Kosti, Sudan

University of El Imam El Mahdi
- جامعة الإمام المهدي
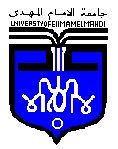
- Type: Public
- Established: 1994; 32 years ago
- Vice-Chancellor: Elhadi Badawi
- Academic staff: 400
- Administrative staff: 897
- Students: 19,651
- Undergraduates: 17,282
- Postgraduates: 2,369
- Location: Kosti, White Nile (state), Sudan; 13°10′N 32°40′E
- Colours
- Website: www.mahdi.edu.sd

University of El Imam El Mahdi is a public Sudanese university based in the town of Kosti, Sudan. The university was founded in 1994 as a public university funded by the Ministry of Higher Education and Scientific Research. It is named in honor of Muhammad Ahmad al-Mahdi, the leader of the Mahdist revolution which overthrew the Ottoman-Egyptian administration and established their own "Islamic and national" government in Sudan (1885–1898).

Since its establishment, the university has striven to realize its goals in providing academic environment conducive to excellent teaching, learning, and research. In line with policy of the Sudanese Ministry of Higher Education, it endeavors to contribute to social, cultural and economic development of the local community and the whole country through the development and implementation of relevant curricula and academic programmes.

== Foundation and development ==
The university was founded in 1994 with three faculties: Faculty of Medicine and Health Sciences, Faculty of Engineering and Technological Studies, and Faculty of Islamic and Arabic Sciences. It Then developed to include following faculties

- Faculty Medical.
- Faculty of Public Health.
- Faculty of Medical Laboratories.
- Faulty of Nursing Science.
- Faculty of Computer Science and Information Technology.
- Faculty of Sharia and Law.
- Faculty of Engineering and Technical Studies.
- Faculty of Economics and Management Sciences.
- Faculty of Arts and Humanities
- Faculty of Education.
- Human Development College
- Community Development College
- Faculty of Postgraduate Studies.

== Location ==
The headquarters of the University of El imam Elmahdi is in Kosti—kilometers south Khartoum, and Its campuses are situated in three coterminous towns of the White Nile State: Kosti, Sudan, Rabak and Aljazeera Aba Island. The largest university campus is Algos campus which houses the following faculties:

1. Faculty of Medicine which graduates qualified doctors whose contribution is to field is tangible locally, nationally and even intentionally.
2. Faculty of Medical Laboratory Sciences which, likewise provides the community with excellent professionals in this significant medical field. Its include the following departments :Clinical Chemistry, Hematology and Immune Hematology, Histopathology, Cytology and Parasitology.
3. Faculty of Public & Environmental Health which graduates whose main to promote the raise awareness of the community towards preventive health and the pressing environmental issues.
4. Faculty of Nursing Sciences whose objectives is to qualify competent assistant medical staff academically and practically. Its alumni graduate with following majors : Surgical Nursing, Internal Medicine Nursing, Mental Health, Nursing of Women and Children, and Community Health.
5. Faculty of Computer Science and Information Technology, which offers a bachelor's degree in computer science and information technology in five years.
6. Faculty of Education whose main is to graduate qualified teachers to meet the needs of the local and national schools, in addition to providing a conducive environment for research in education in the Sciences and the Humanities. It includes the following departments; Islamic Studies, Arabic, English, Biology, Chemistry, Physics, Mathematics, Geography and History.
7. Faculty of Postgraduate Studies, which oversees the postgraduate programmes offered by all the faculties of the university and it awards degrees such as postgraduate diplomas, master's degrees and doctorate degrees in a wide range of specialties.

There are two neighboring campuses in Kosti where other two important faculties are situated:

1. Faculty of Economics and Management Sciences which awards bachelor's in five years and it comprises the following departments: Economics, Accounting, Business Administration, Rural Development and Islamic Economics
2. Faculty of Human Development which awards an intermediate diploma in three years in a wide range of specialties.

Rabak town hosts two important faculties:

1. Faculty of Engineering and Technological Studies, which is located to the east of Rabak near Um Dabiker Company for Electricity Generation, awards the degree of (BSc honors) in Engineering in five years. It comprises the following departments; Chemical Engineering, Mechanical Engineering, Food Manufacturing Engineering, Civil Engineering and Electrical Engineering
2. Faculty of Community Development which is located to the south of Rabak's main market aims at developing the local community by providing diverse opportunity for training and education without prerequisite secondary education. it offers courses pertinent to the empowerment of women and the development of their abilities and skills sewing, embroidery, food production industry, Islamic studies and Qur'anic sciences. It has different outpost centers in rural area of the state. These include Guli, Al Shawwal, AlKunooz, Alfashashoya, Tandelti and Al Jazeera Aba.

There are, furthermore, two important faculties whose campuses are in the Al Jazeera Aba town:

1. Faculty of Sharia and Law which includes the following departments: Public Law, Private Law, Jurisprudence, Comparative Jurisprudence and International Law
1. Faculty of Arts and Humanities includes nine departments; Islamic Studies, Arabic, English, Psychology, Library Sciences, Geography, History, Media and Philosophy.

In addition to the accomplishment of its academic and research missions, the University of Elimam El Mahdi is mindful of its role in the contribution to the service of the community and catering for its economic, social and cultural needs. Therefore, the university has put in place relevant research and service centers. These include:

- Center for Computer Studies
- Centre for Qualification of Imams and Preachers
- Centre for Studies and Research of Endemic Diseases,
- Center for Mahdist Studies,
- Center for Research and Engineering Consultancy,
- Center for Peaceful Coexistence and Conflict Resolution,
- Center for Arbitration and Legal Aid,
- Center for Economic and Social Studies,
- Center for Languages and Translation
- Center for Nile Basin Studies and Natural Disasters

== University Council ==
It is considered the highest authority at the university and its chancellor is appointed by a republican decree after a recommendation of the minister of higher education and scientific research.

== Council formation ==
It is formed from the chancellor and members according to their jobs in the university, the chancellor, the university vice chancellor, the principal in addition to a number of faculties' deans who represent teaching staff, laborers and students, with twenty-one members from outside the university.

== The Most Important Deputies of the Council ==
Making the policies and plans that drive at promoting the university and developing its performance scientifically, educationally, administratively and financially beside modernizing work systems, discussing the annual budget suggestions, making the development plans and establishing faculties, institutes, schools and centers.

An executive and financial affairs committee derived from the university council and it is formed from council chancellor, vice chancellor, deputy vice chancellor, the principal as a rapporteur of the committee, the financial controller, four members from the university and five members from outside the university.

== Vice Chancellor ==
Period	The Vice-chancellor's name	Reference
1993–1997	Prof. Mohamed El-Hassan Ahmed Abu Shanab	
1997–2003	Prof. Abdulazeem Abbas Elhaj	
2003–2011	Dr. Abdulraheem Osman Mohamed	
2011–2013	Dr. Bashir Mohamed Adam	
2013–2019	Prof. Noreldaem Osman Mohamed	
2019–2022	Dr. Elhadi Badawi Mahgoub Barakat	
2022–present	Dr. Mohamed Mahdi Ahmed Bukhari	

== Awards Degree ==
1. Intermediate Diploma (three years)
2. bachelor's degree in arts (B.A )
3. bachelor's degree in science (B.Sc.)
4. Master's Degree in Arts (M.A)
5. Master's Degree in Science (M.Sc.)
6. PhD in wide range of specialties )

== See also ==
- Education in Sudan
- List of universities in Sudan
