= University of Dongola =

University in Sudan

Coordinates: 19°10′29.6″N 30°27′18.8″E

- جامعة دنقلا
- Type: Public
- Established: 1991; 35 years ago
- Location: Dongola, Northern State, Sudan
- Website: http://www.uofd.edu.sd/en/

The University of Dongola (in Arabic جامعة دنقلا), is a public university located in Dongola, Sudan. UofD has a standing relationship and has conducted conferences with Horseed International University, based in Mogadishu, Somalia.

== See also ==
- Education in Sudan
- List of universities in Sudan
