= Open University of Sudan =

University in Sudan

Coordinates: 15.5651°N 32.5626°E

Open University of Sudan (OUS) جامعة السودان المفتوحة
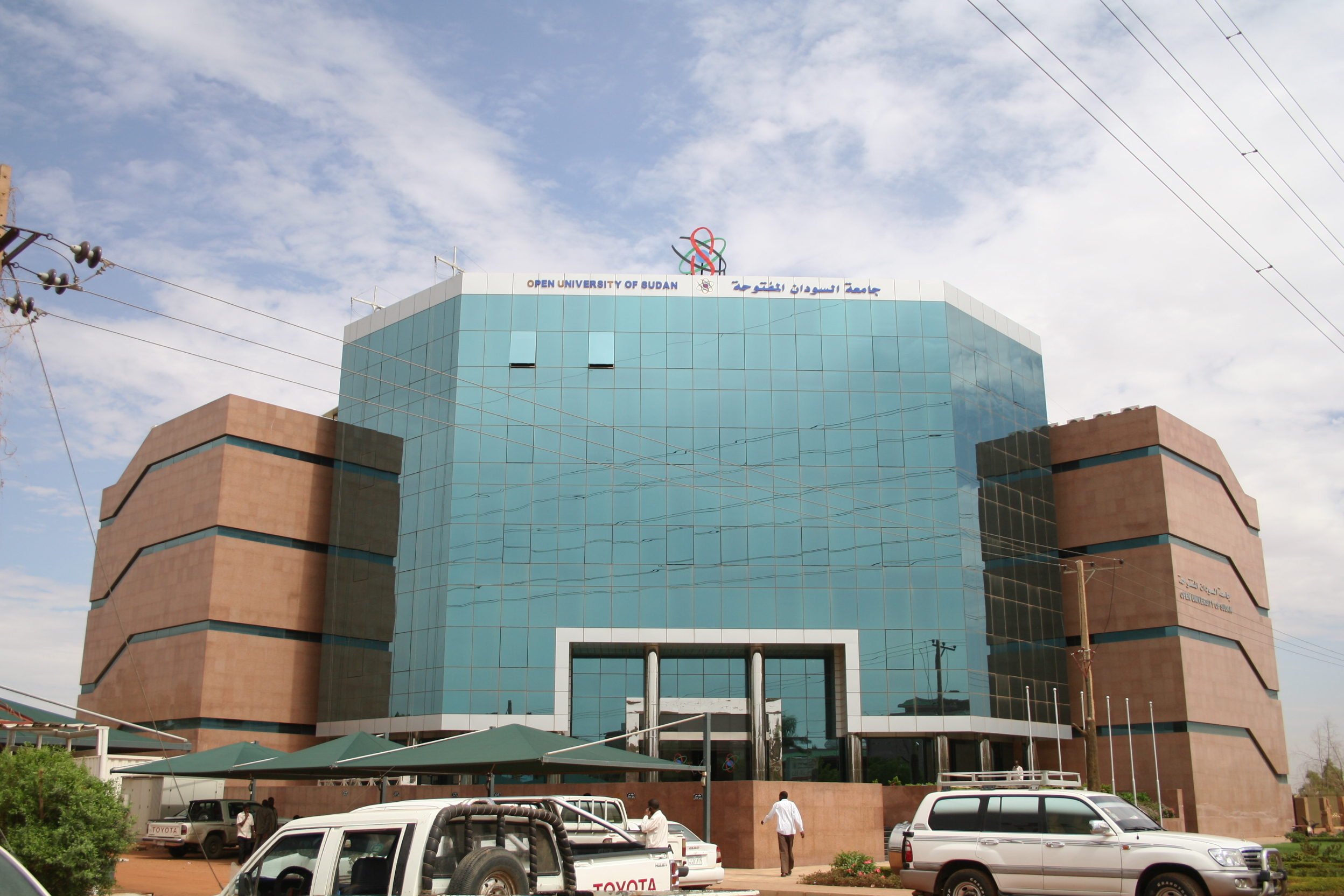
- OUS headquarters
- Type: Public
- Established: 2002
- Location: Khartoum, Khartoum, Sudan
- Website: www.ous.edu.sd

The Open University of Sudan (OUS) is a public university based in Khartoum, Sudan that provides bachelor and postgraduate courses through distance education. The university is a member of the Federation of the Universities of the Islamic World.

== The Departments ==
- Center for Human Resources Management
- MBA Of finance
- Department of Public Relations
- Educational Broadcasting
- Educational satellite channel
- Secretariat of the Libraries
- Center for Human Resources Management
- Education Development Center
- Center for Arabic Language for Speakers of Other Languages
- Continuing Education Project
- Technical Education Project
- E-learning project

== See also ==
- Education in Sudan
- List of universities in Sudan
