= Sinnar University =

University in Sudan

Coordinates: 13.5508°N 33.6067°E

- جامعة سنار
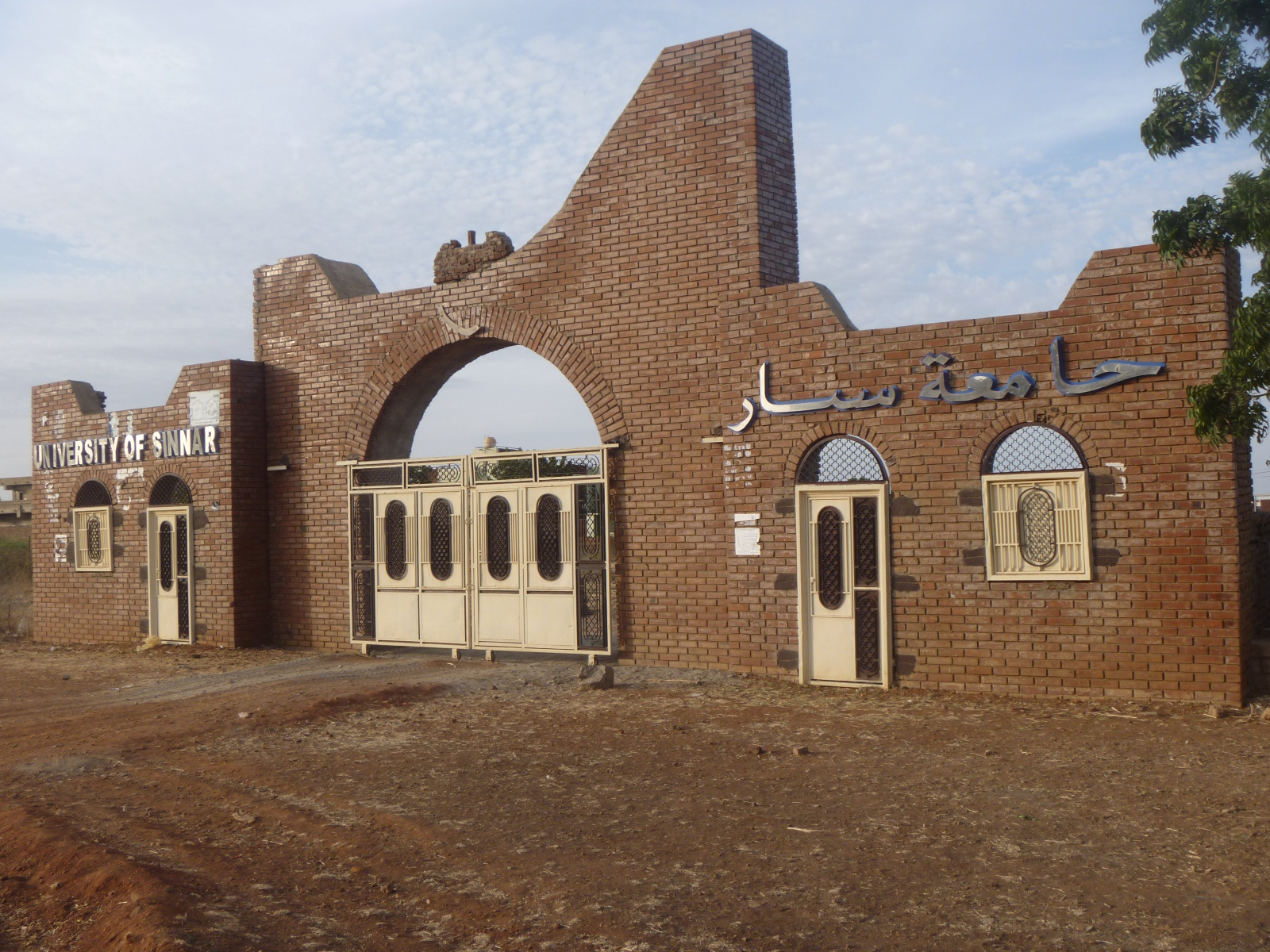
- Type: Public
- Established: 1977; 49 years ago
- Location: Sennar, Sudan
- Website: uofs.edu.sd

Sinnar University is a public university in Sennar, Sudan. It was established in 1977. It is a member of the Federation of the Universities of the Islamic World. As of September 2011, the university was a member in good standing of the Association of African Universities.

== See also ==
- Education in Sudan
- List of Islamic educational institutions
