= Elrazi University =

University in Khartoum, Sudan

Coordinates: 15.5122°N 32.5927°E

- جامعة الرازي
- Established: 2001; 25 years ago
- Chairman: Ahmad Rizig
- President: Ibrahim Ghandour
- Location: Khartoum, Sudan
- Website: www.elrazi.edu.sd

Elrazi University (Arabic: جامعة الرازي) is a private university located in Khartoum, Sudan. It was founded in 2001 by the first batch in the dental program for the academic year 2001/2002. Elrazi University has been recognized and accredited by: The Ministry of Higher Education, Sudanese Medical Council European & African universities WHO Members of the Association of Arab Universities. National, Regional & International Links and affiliations: Elrazi University is a member of the Union of Sudanese Universities. A member of Sudanese Association of Deans of Schools of Medicine & Health Sciences. Elrazi also has agreements with National University of Medical & Technological Sciences. Has signed agreements with: University of Tanta of Egypt and the University of Bath & the University of Warwick of the UK.

== Establishment ==
An overview of the university and its development. In 1999, a group of doctors and university professors from inside and outside of Sudan gathered to think about establishing a university with qualitative specifications, that would cover the country's need for higher education at an advanced level.. Then they began planning and financing this project from the shareholders.

The beginning was in 1999. After that, the requirements of higher education were fulfilled, and the college obtained the final approval in the year 2000, when the college started with two programs: A Bachelors in Dentistry and a Diploma in Dental Technology.

== Buildings & Sites ==
Elrazi University has purchased land for current and future buildings. The total land owned by the University is more than fifty-five thousand square meters, these include:

=== Main university buildings ===
1. Hospital buildings
2. Elrazi 2 buildings
3. The university's radio buildings
4. The Bank branch buildings, which are operated by a national bank
5. University storage buildings and warehouses

== Programs ==
- Bachelor of Medicine
- Bachelor of Dentistry
- Bachelor of Pharmacy
- Bachelor of Medical Laboratories
- Bachelor of Medical Radiology
- Bachelor of Nursing
- Diploma in Dental Technology
- Bachelor in Optics
- Bachelor of Business Administration
- Bachelor of Information Technology

Preliminary approval has been obtained from the Ministry of Higher Education to add the following faculties: Engineering and Physiotherapy.
