= Academy of Engineering Sciences (Sudan) =

Private university in Khartoum

Academy of Engineering and Medical Sciences
- أكاديمية العلوم الهندسية و الطبية
- Former names: College of Electrical Engineering, Academy of Engineering Sciences
- Type: Private
- Established: 2002; 24 years ago
- President: Prof. Mohamed Ali Basheer
- Vice-president: Mr. Kamil Abdullah El-Kamil
- Dean: Prof. Mohamed Ali Basheer
- Location: Lamab Nasir, Khartoum, Khartoum State, Sudan
- Colors: White & Blue
- Website: www.aems.edu.sd]

Academy of Engineering and Medical Sciences (formerly shortened to AEMS)(Arabic: أكاديمية العلوم الهندسية والطبية) is a private University in Khartoum, Sudan. It was founded in 2002.

== History ==
Academy of Engineering and Medical Sciences (AEMS) was founded in 2002 with only Computer Engineering (Diploma and Bachelor) & Communication Engineering (Diploma and Bachelor), in 2007 the diploma Programs were frozen up to date.

In 2006 two more bachelor programs were added, Electrical Power Engineering bachelor and Electrical Machines Engineering bachelor.

In 2010, Computer Engineering & Electrical Machines Engineering were Edited to be Bachelor in Electronics And Computer Engineering & Bachelor in Electrical Control Engineering, and Architecture Program Started. In 2013 business Administration program started. And in 2016 Mathematics and Computer Science program started.

== Programs ==
The academy has the following undergraduate programs:

- Bachelor of Computer & Electronics Engineering.
- Bachelor of Communication Engineering.
- Bachelor of Electrical Power Engineering.
- Bachelor of Electrical Control Engineering.
- Bachelor of Architecture.
- Bachelor of Business Administration.
- Bachelor of Accounting.
- Bachelor of Information Technology.
- Bachelor of Mathematics and Computer Sciences.
- Bachelor of Mechatronics Engineering.

It offers Postgraduate - Master of Science programs in:

- Computer Engineering.
- Communication Engineering.
- Electrical Power Engineering.

AEMS's medium of instruction is English.

== See also ==
- Education in Sudan
- List of universities in Sudan
