= Nile Valley University =

Public university in Khartoum, Sudan

- جامعة وادي النيل
- Type: Public
- Established: 1990; 36 years ago
- Location: Khartoum, Sudan
- Website: www.nilevalley.edu.sd

Nile Valley University (NVU) or Wadi El-Neel University is a public university located in Khartoum, Sudan. It was founded in 1990.

It is a member of the Federation of the Universities of the Islamic World and the Association of African Universities.

== See also ==
- List of Islamic educational institutions
- Education in Sudan
