= Red Sea University =

University in Sudan

Coordinates: 19.6109°N 37.2206°E

- جامعة البحر الأحمر
- Type: Public
- Established: 1994; 32 years ago
- Location: Port Sudan, Sudan
- Website: www.rsu.edu.sd

Red Sea University (Arabic: جامعة البحر الأحمر, Jām'ah al-Baḥr al-aḥmar) is located in the city of Port Sudan, in the state of The Red Sea in eastern Sudan. It was established in 1994. It is a member of the Federation of the Universities of the Islamic World.

There are eight schools within the university: Marine Science and Fisheries, Engineering, Economic school, Education, Medicine, Science and Earth Science.

== History ==
The Red Sea University was established in 1994 according to Republican Decree No. (67), according to which the University of the East was divided into three universities: Kassala University, Gedaref University, and Red Sea University.

Red Sea University began as an independent university with three faculties, namely the College of Marine Sciences, the College of Engineering and the College of Earth Sciences. The School of Maritime Transport was established shortly after, then transferred to the College of Economics and Administrative Sciences in the year 1995; maritime transport studies became one of its other departments. .

In the year 1994, a republican decree was issued to convert all the institutes and colleges of teacher preparation affiliated with the Ministry of Education spread throughout Sudan into colleges of education and affiliated with universities. According to this decree, the Institute of Teachers’ Preparation in Port Sudan was transferred to the College of Education and was designated for graduating basic stage teachers. The College of Education in Jabet City was established to graduate secondary school teachers in the year 1998.

In 1998, the College of Medicine and Health Sciences was established for the purpose of providing qualified doctors and medical staff, as was the College of Applied Sciences. The College of Applies Sciences was founded in response to the presence of a number of colleges of a scientific nature in addition to the accompanying expansion in structures This educational service included other sectors of society with different conditions and needs that were achieved by conducting additional and continuing studies in 1995. Several study programs qualifying for intermediate and technical diplomas have been implemented in the disciplines of education, economics, engineering, earth sciences and applied sciences. Large numbers of students have graduated from these diplomas, in addition to studying by affiliation to obtain a bachelor's degree from the Faculty of Economics. Due to the expansion of additional studies and the success they have achieved, they have been transferred to a stand-alone college under the name of College of Technical Studies.

The university established a unit for postgraduate studies in 1996, and the first batch of higher education diplomas was registered, followed by registration for a master's degree in the faculties of education, marine sciences, economics and applied sciences, with the research system only. In 2004, the Deanship of Postgraduate Studies and Scientific Research was established and an equipped building was allocated for postgraduate studies.

In 2007, the College of Arts and Humanities was established, bringing the number of university faculties to nine faculties and a Deanship of Postgraduate Studies. The university shifted from the stage of foundation in the infrastructure to the stage of refining the educational process to raise it qualitatively and quantitatively to the ranks ofvanced universities. In this context, attention was paid to attracting faculty and teaching assistants, and sending them for training.

== Schools and colleges ==
- College of Earth Sciences
- College of Marine Sciences
- College of Engineering
- College of Earth Sciences
- Faculty of Economics and Administrative Sciences
- Faculty of Education
- College of Medicine and Health Sciences
- Faculty of Applied Science
- College of Technical Studies
- Faculty of Arts and Humanities
- Faculty of Dentistry
- Faculty of Agriculture
- School of Law

== See also ==
- Education in Sudan
- List of universities in Sudan
