= Port Sudan =

City in Red Sea State, Sudan

Port Sudan بور سودان Bar'uut
- City
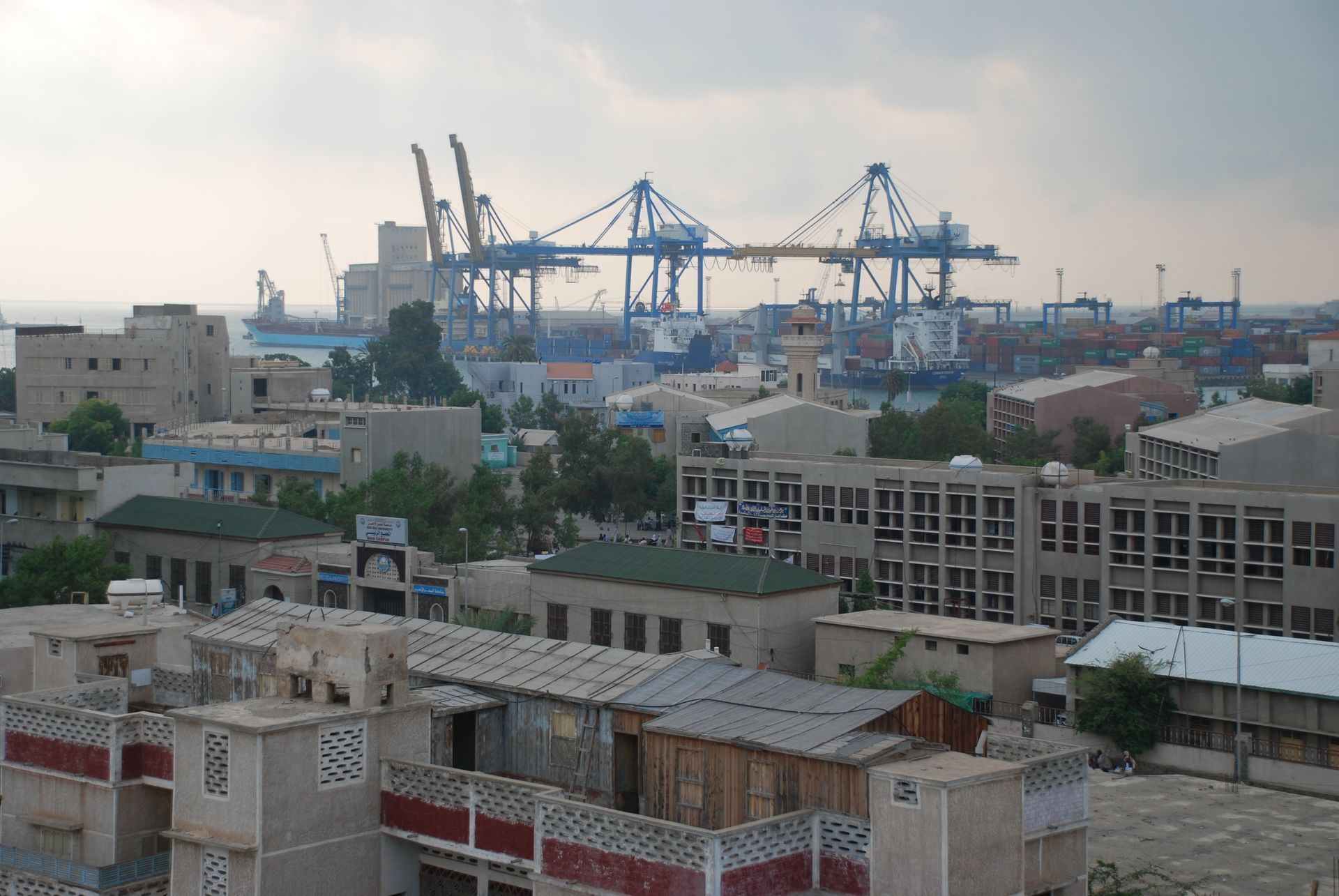
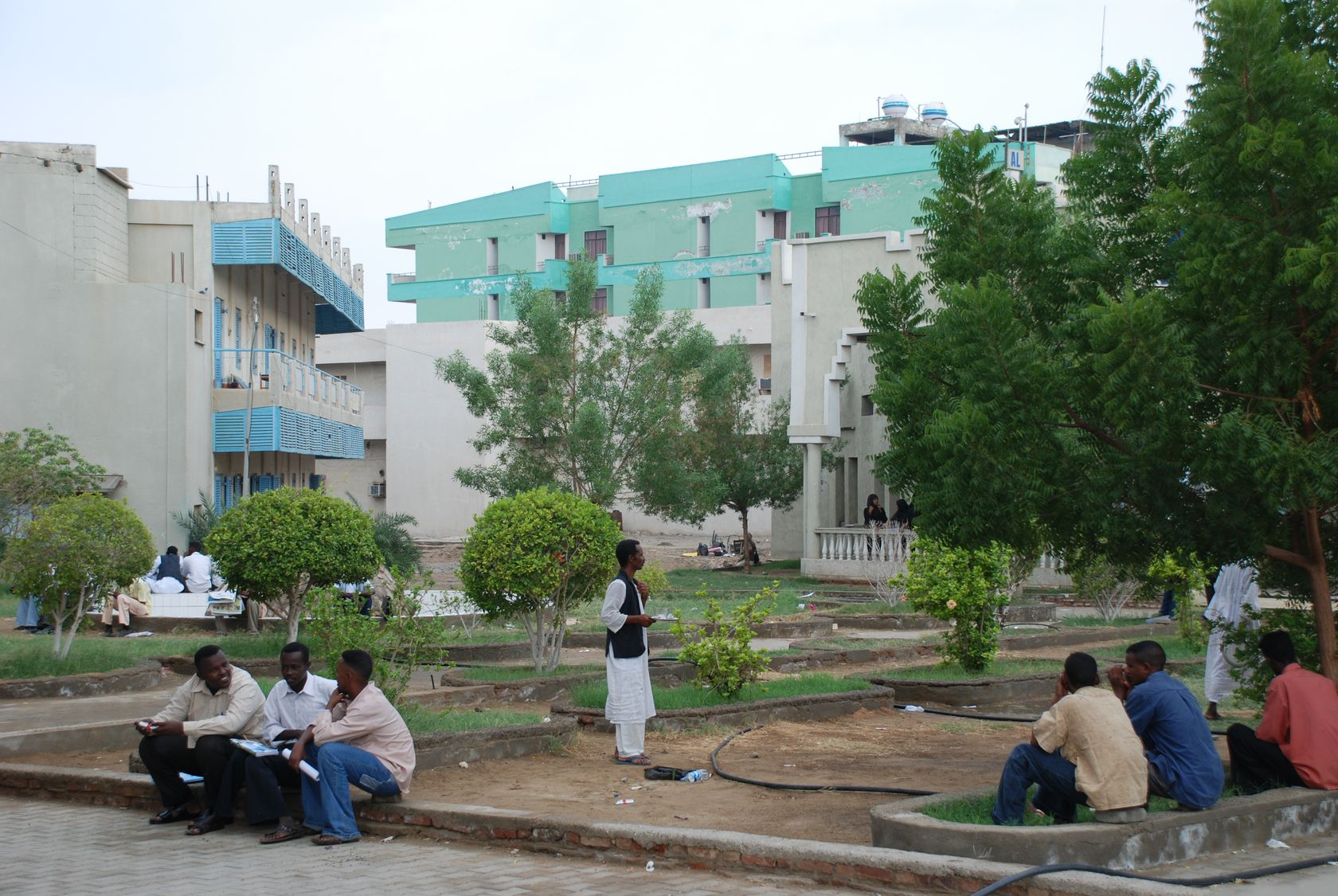
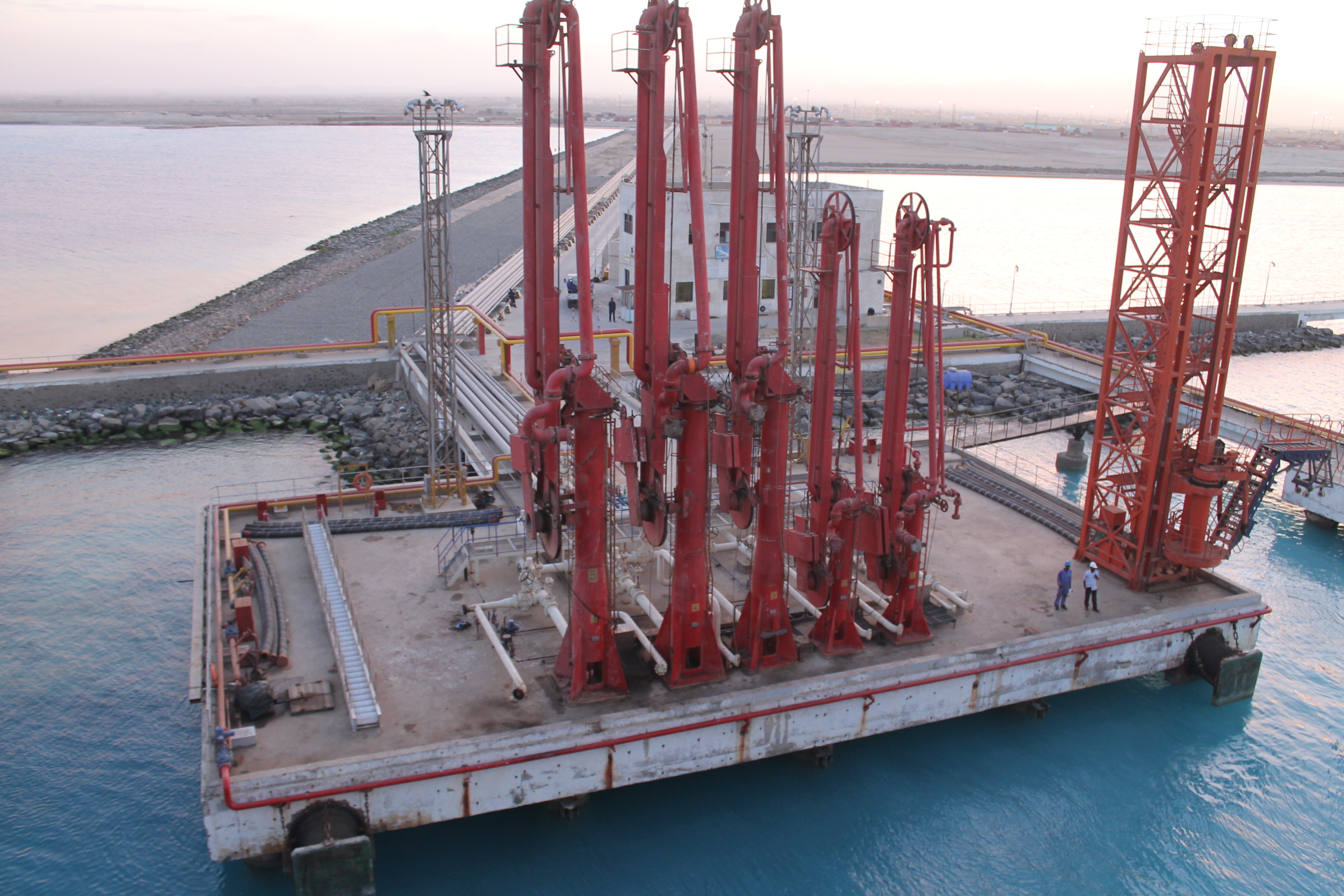
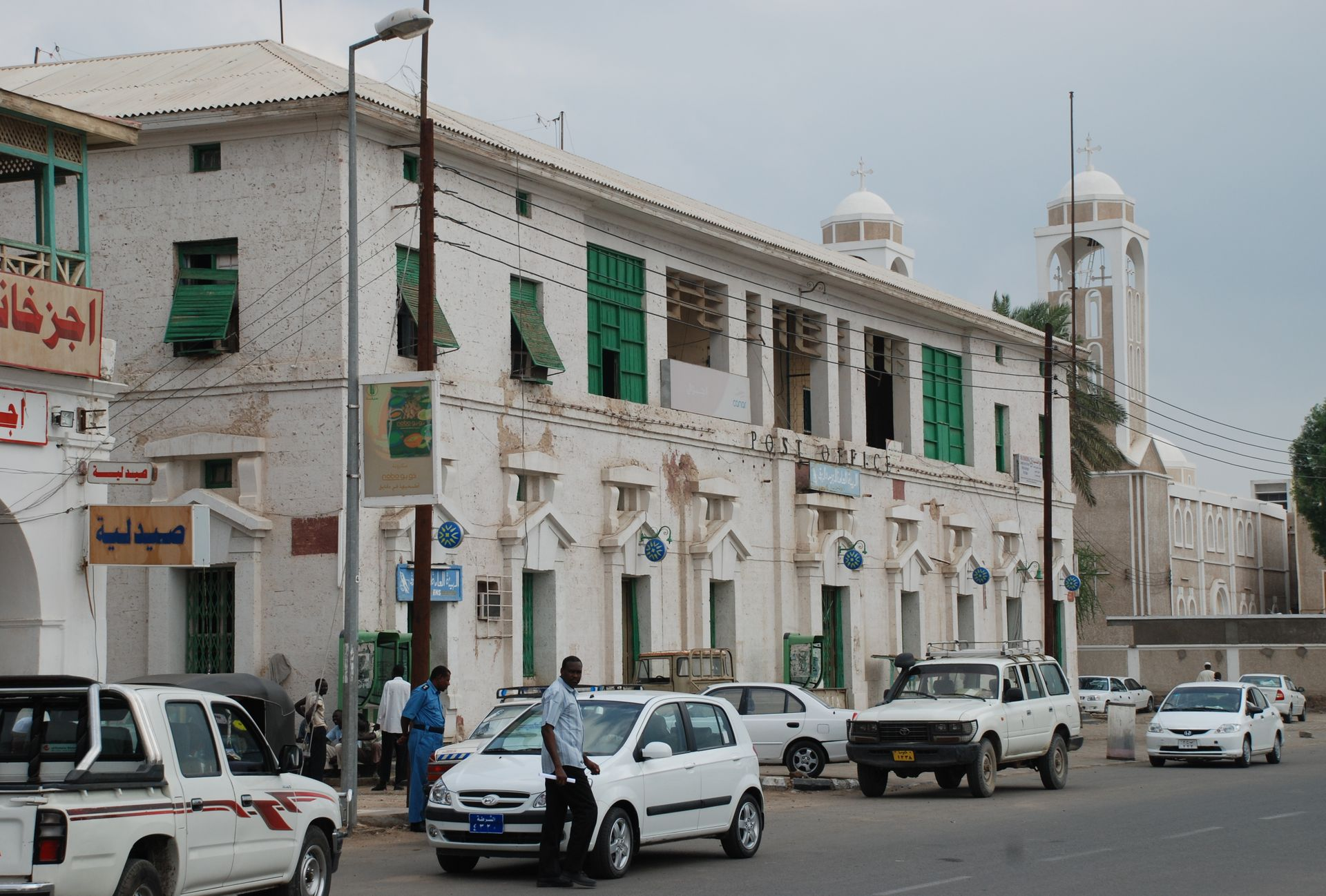
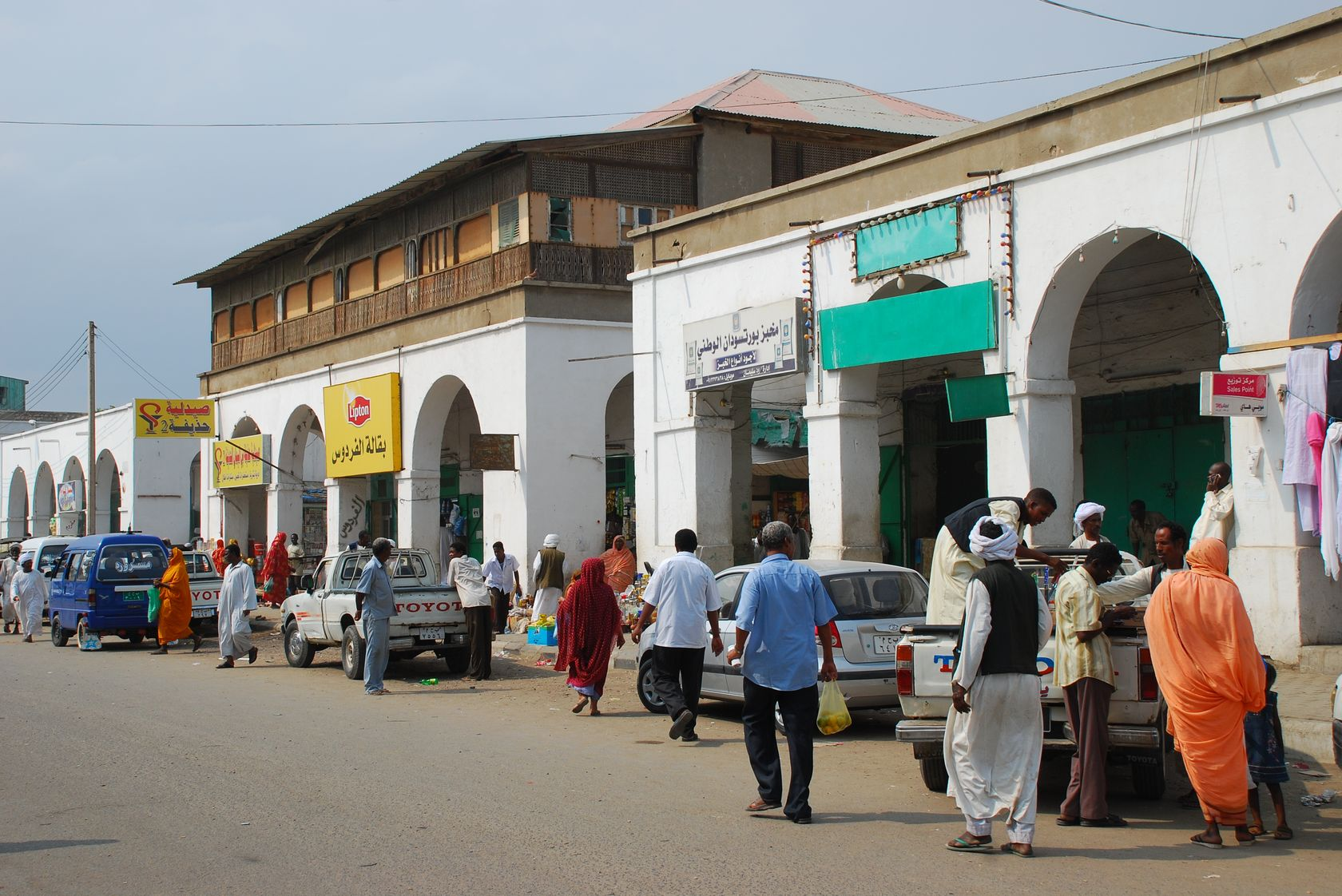
- Top: Port Sudan Skyline; Middle: Red Sea University, Port Sudan Harbour; Bottom: Port Sudan Post Office, Port Sudan Old Market

- Location in Sudan
- Coordinates: 19°36′07″N 37°12′27″E
- Country: Sudan
- State: Red Sea
- Elevation: 1.8 m (6 ft)

Population (2025)
  - Metro: 547,260
- Time zone: UTC+02:00 (CAT)

Port Sudan (Arabic: بور سودان, romanized: Būr Sūdān, Beja: Bar'uut) is a major port city on the Red Sea in eastern Sudan, and the capital of Red Sea State. Port Sudan is Sudan's main seaport and the source of 90% of the country's international trade. The population of Port Sudan was estimated in the 2008 Census of Sudan to be 394,561 people.

Port Sudan has historically been a centre for commercial activity, particularly in the shipping industry.

From April 2023 to January 2026, the Sudanese government largely operated from Port Sudan as a result of intense fighting in the capital city Khartoum in the ongoing civil war, leading to it being described as a de facto capital of the country. Port Sudan also emerged as a refuge for internally displaced persons in Sudan.

== History ==
=== Founding and early history ===
Port Sudan was built between 1905 and 1909 by the administration of Anglo-Egyptian Sudan to replace Suakin—the historic, coral-choked Arab port. An oil pipeline was built between the port and Khartoum in 1977.

=== Early 21st century ===
In 2009, Israel allegedly used naval commandos to attack Iranian arms ships at Port Sudan as part of Operation Birds of Prey. In 2020, Russian president Vladimir Putin announced that the Russian Navy would begin construction on a base with capacity for 300 personnel and four warships in Port Sudan, with an agreement to use the facility as a Russian naval base in Sudan for at least 25 years. The plan was ultimately suspended, though Sudanese leadership indicated in 2022 that it was possible that the construction could again move forward in the future.

In 2016, it was reported that residents of Port Sudan faced water scarcity. Following the October–November 2021 Sudanese coup d'état, the Beja tribal council initiated a weeklong blockade of the city's ports. Following negotiations with military officials, the blockade was lifted after a week.

=== Sudanese civil war (2023–present) ===
During the Sudanese civil war (2023–present), Port Sudan has emerged as a leading destination and refuge for internally displaced persons fleeing war in other parts of the country. Internally-displaced refugees in the city reportedly face extreme heat and shortages of food and water.

By late October 2023, Reuters reported that the Rapid Support Forces (RSF) controlled most of Khartoum, causing the government led by Abdul Fattah el-Burhan to have largely relocated to Port Sudan. General Abdul Fattah al-Burhan, leader of the Sudanese Armed Forces, "has threatened to establish a cabinet" in Port Sudan, "with the intention of creating an alternative or second capital." Hemedti, leader of the RSF, in turn, warned that this would lead to him declaring his own rival government based in Khartoum or another city he controlled. Analysts have raised concerns of a lasting split similar to that of Libya during its civil wars. Port Sudan has been described as becoming a "de facto" capital of Sudan.

Iran and Russia have been trying to negotiate with Sudan to build a naval base in the city.

On 4 May 2025, the RSF launched drone attacks on Port Sudan for the first time since the beginning of the war, targeting the Osman Digna Air Base, "a goods warehouse and some civilian facilities" and causing "limited damage". A day later, another RSF drone attack occurred targeting fuel depots, leading to a fire. Some Arab nations condemned the actions.

== Economy ==
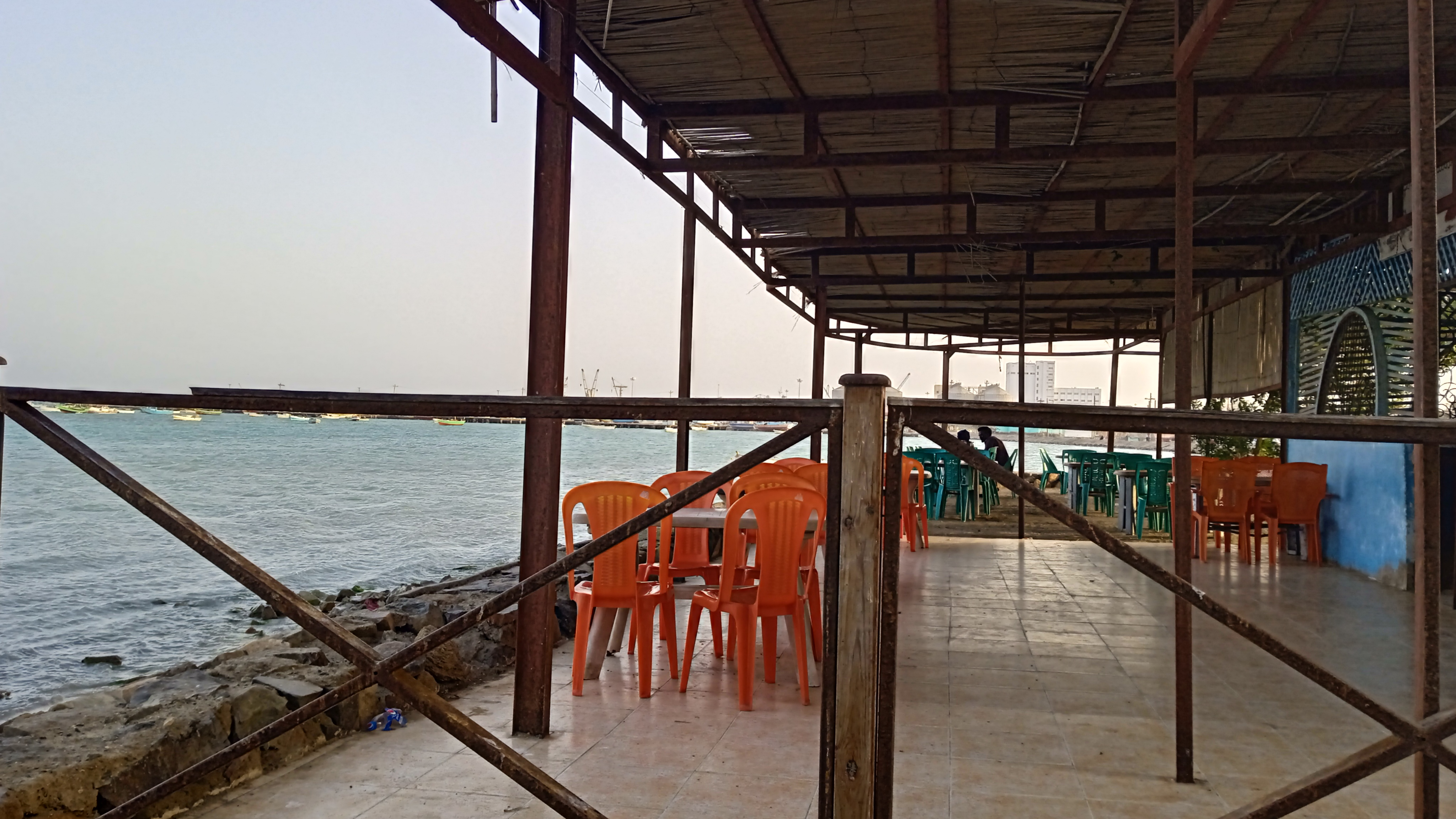
Fish restaurant in Port Sudan

The city has an oil refinery and handles 90% of the country's international trade. Major exports include oilseed, senna, and hides and skins. Imports include construction materials, heavy machinery, and vehicles.

== Transport ==
The city has a modern container port to handle imports and exports. The port is part of the 21st Century Maritime Silk Road that runs from the Chinese coast via The Suez Canal to the Mediterranean, there to the Upper Adriatic region of Trieste with its rail connections to Central and Eastern Europe.

The main airport is Port Sudan New International Airport. There is now a tarred road linking Port Sudan to Khartoum via Atbara. Port Sudan also has a 1,067 mm (3 ft 6 in) gauge rail link with Khartoum. There is also an international ferry from Jeddah.

In 2023 a new seaport was proposed about 200 kilometres or 120 miles north of Port Sudan at Abu Amama. A 450-kilometre or 280-mile road to the farming hub at Abu Hamad would also be provided. This new seaport would be opposite Jeddah and thus shorten the ferry trip.

== Education ==
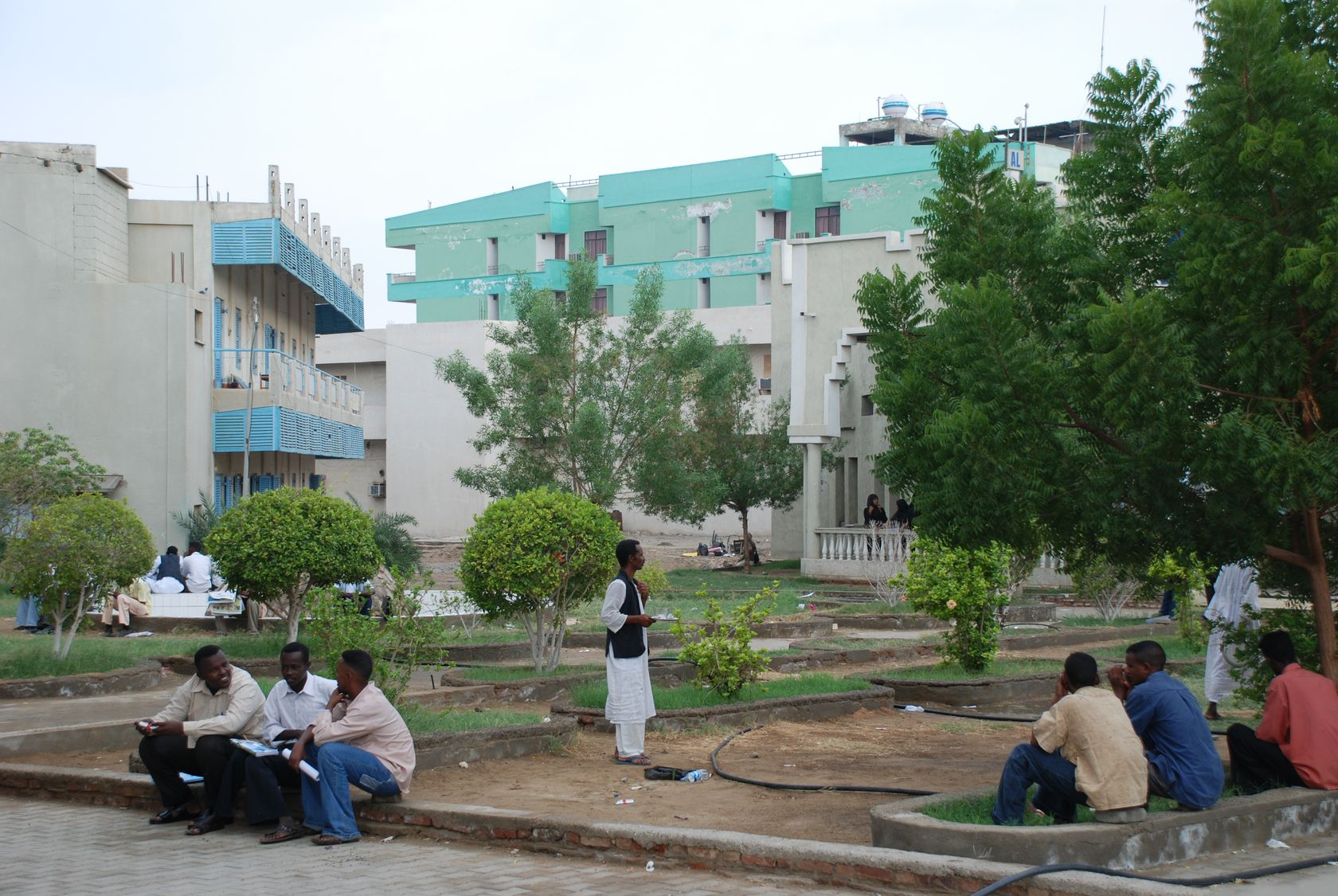
Red Sea University campus

The city is home to the Red Sea University, established in 1994.

== Places of worship ==
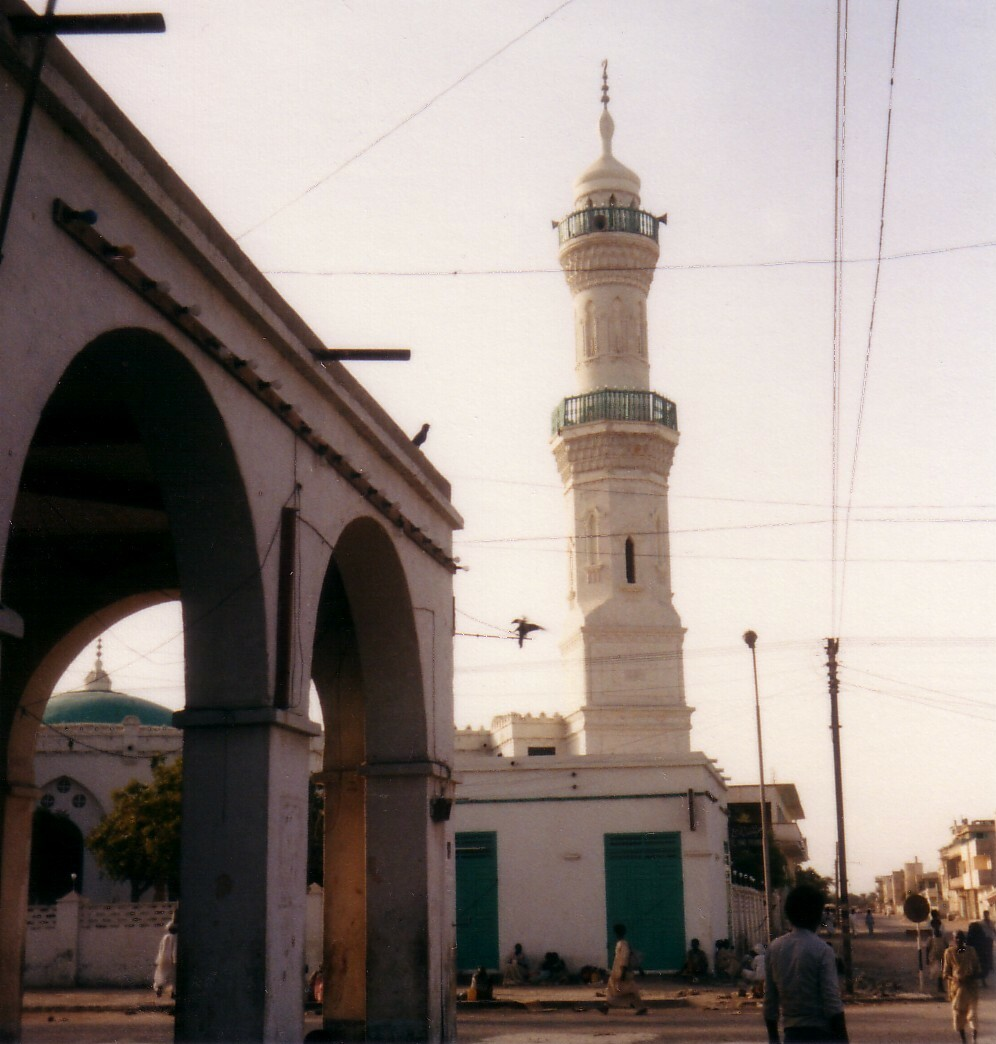
Mosque at Port Sudan

Places of worship are predominantly Muslim mosques, but there are also Christian churches and temples including the Roman Catholic Archdiocese of Khartoum (Catholic Church), Sudan Interior Church (Baptist World Alliance), and Presbyterian Church in Sudan (World Communion of Reformed Churches) and Coptic Orthodox Churches.

== Climate ==
Port Sudan has a hot desert climate (Köppen: BWh) with extremely hot summers and moderately hot winters, requiring the acquisition of fresh water from Wadi Arba'at in the Red Sea Hills and from salt-evaporating pans. Temperatures can easily exceed 30 °C (86 °F) in winter and 45 °C (113 °F) in summer. Over 90% of the annual rainfall falls between October and January, mostly in November, with the wettest month on record being November 1947 with 182 millimetres (7.2 in), whilst the wettest year was from July 1923 to June 1924 with 231 millimetres (9.1 in). Average annual rainfall is 76 millimetres (3.0 in), and no rainfall occurred between January 1983 and June 1984. The mean temperature year round (the average of all daily highs and nighttime lows) is 28.4 °C (83.1 °F).

Climate data for Port Sudan, Sudan (1991–2020 normals, extremes 1906–present)
Month	Jan	Feb	Mar	Apr	May	Jun	Jul	Aug	Sep	Oct	Nov	Dec	Year
Record high °C (°F)	37 (99)	36.6 (97.9)	40 (104)	41.8 (107.2)	47 (117)	48.6 (119.5)	48.9 (120.0)	48.6 (119.5)	46.5 (115.7)	44.3 (111.7)	39 (102)	38 (100)	48.9 (120.0)
Mean daily maximum °C (°F)	27.3 (81.1)	27.8 (82.0)	29.7 (85.5)	32.9 (91.2)	37.0 (98.6)	40.2 (104.4)	42.7 (108.9)	42.7 (108.9)	39.5 (103.1)	34.9 (94.8)	31.4 (88.5)	28.7 (83.7)	34.6 (94.3)
Daily mean °C (°F)	23.5 (74.3)	23.5 (74.3)	24.7 (76.5)	27.5 (81.5)	31.0 (87.8)	33.7 (92.7)	36.2 (97.2)	36.6 (97.9)	33.6 (92.5)	30.2 (86.4)	27.7 (81.9)	25.1 (77.2)	29.4 (84.9)
Mean daily minimum °C (°F)	19.8 (67.6)	19.2 (66.6)	19.7 (67.5)	22.1 (71.8)	24.9 (76.8)	27.2 (81.0)	29.6 (85.3)	30.5 (86.9)	27.8 (82.0)	25.5 (77.9)	23.9 (75.0)	21.5 (70.7)	24.3 (75.7)
Record low °C (°F)	10 (50)	10 (50)	10 (50)	12.3 (54.1)	17.4 (63.3)	17.2 (63.0)	20 (68)	20 (68)	18.9 (66.0)	16 (61)	17.5 (63.5)	9 (48)	9 (48)
Average precipitation mm (inches)	2.3 (0.09)	0.1 (0.00)	0.1 (0.00)	8.8 (0.35)	1.0 (0.04)	0.9 (0.04)	3.8 (0.15)	2.3 (0.09)	0.0 (0.0)	17.9 (0.70)	24.6 (0.97)	18.8 (0.74)	80.6 (3.17)
Average precipitation days (≥ 1.0 mm)	0.3	0.0	0.0	0.4	0.3	0.1	0.7	0.4	0.0	1.3	2.3	1.3	7.1
Average relative humidity (%)	64	65	63	58	46	37	38	40	50	65	68	67	55
Mean monthly sunshine hours	195.3	204.4	266.6	291.0	310.0	264.0	229.4	223.2	264.0	279.0	228.0	182.9	2,937.8
Source 1: NOAA
Source 2: Meteo Climat (record highs and lows)

== Demographics ==
Year	Population
1906	4,289
1941	26,255
1973	132,632
1983	209,938
1993	305,385
2007 (est.)	489,275
2008 (est.)	517,338

The population consists mainly of the native Beja people, Nubians, Arabs, and West Africans, with small Asian and European minorities.

== Sport ==
Hay Al-Arab SC founded in 1928, and Hilal Alsahil SC founded in 1937, both play at the Port Sudan Stadium in the football Sudan Premier League. The city's third team is Al-Merreikh Al-Thagher.

== Notable people ==
- Gawaher (Pop singer)
- Ra'ouf Mus'ad (Playwright)
- Abdel Karim al Kabli (singer)

== See also ==
- Suakin
