= Blue Nile University =

University in Ad-Damāzīn, Sudan

University of Blue Nile
- Type: Public
- Established: 1995; 31 years ago
- Location: Ad-Damazin, Blue Nile, Sudan; 11.785°N 34.347°E
- Website: www.bnu.edu.sd

Blue Nile University (Arabic: جامعة النيل الأزرق, Jām'ah al-Nīl al-azraq) is a public university located in Damazeen, Sudan. It was established in 1995. It is a member of the Federation of the Universities of the Islamic World.

The University was the site of a sit-in and subsequent closure in 2021, after robbery at a "women’s residence"; protest demands included security for such residences.

== See also ==
- List of Islamic educational institutions
- List of universities in Sudan
