= Omdurman Ahlia University =

Community university in Omdurman, Sudan

- جامعة أم درمان الأهلية
- Type: Non-profit
- Established: 1 November 1986; 39 years ago
- Dean: Prof. Motasim Ahmed Alhag
- Location: Omdurman, Khartoum, Sudan; 15.6294°N 32.4651°E
- Website: www.oau.edu.sd

Omdurman Ahlia University (OAU) is a community non-profit university in Omdurman, Sudan. It was opened on 1 November 1986 as Omdurman Ahlia College, and was upgraded to University status on 7 May 1995.

As of September 2011, the university was a member in good standing of the Association of African Universities.
