= Bayan University =

College in Khartoum, Sudan

Coordinates: 15°35′57″N 32°30′34″E

- جامعة البيان
- Type: Private
- Established: 1997; 29 years ago
- Chairman: Yassin Homaida
- Dean: Jafar Mohammed Bashir
- Location: Khartoum, Khartoum, Sudan
- Website: www.bayan.edu.sd

The Bayan University (Arabic:جامعة البيان) is an educational institution based in the city of Khartoum, Sudan. It was established in 1997 as the "Bayan College of Science and Technology", and admitted the first students in 1998. The university offers diplomas in Construction Engineering and Construction, Information Technology and Engineering of medical equipment. It offers bachelor's degrees in Computer Science, Information Systems and Electronic Engineering. The university is a member of the Sudanese University Libraries Consortium.

In 2021 the college had been upgraded to a university by the Ministry of Higher Education and Scientific Research.
