= University of Gadarif =

Public university in Al Qadarif, Sudan

Coordinates: 14.0661°N 35.3329°E

University of Gadarif جامعة القضارف
- Type: Public
- Established: 1990
- President: Ibrahim Abdelsalam
- Administrative staff: 274
- Location: Al Qadarif, Sudan
- Website: www.gaduniv.edu.sd

The University of Gadarif (also called Gedaref, Gedarif or El Gadarif) is a public university in the town of Al Qadarif, capital of the state of Al Qadarif in Sudan. The university was founded in 1990. Faculties include Medicine and Health Sciences, Computer Science and Information Technology, Economics and Administrative Sciences, Agricultural and Environmental, Education and Sharia and Islamic Studies. The university is a member of the Federation of the Universities of the Islamic World and the Foundation for Advancement of international Medical Education and Research (FAIMER).
