= Canadian Sudanese College =

Private educational institution in Sudan

- Type: Private
- Established: 2013; 13 years ago
- Location: Khartoum, Sudan; 15.5782°N 32.5744°E
- Website: ccs.edu.sd

The Canadian Sudanese College is an educational institution based in the city of Khartoum, Sudan. The CSC is the model College in Sudan, and has developed robust developmental strategies to meet and sustain that status and remain a pride of Sudanese and humanity in the provision of higher education.

The board's Chairman is Dr. Al-Jazuli Daf'allah, a former prime minister of Sudan. The college offers bachelor's in Medicine, Nursing, Medical Laboratory Science, Business Administration, Information Technology, Computer Information Systems, Management Information Systems, and Accounting. The college is a member of the Sudanese University Libraries Consortium.
