= AlMughtaribeen University =

Private university in Khartoum, Sudan

- جامعة المغتربين
- Motto: خصوصية الاسم عمومية القبول (Arabic)
- Motto in English: Name is specific, Admission is for all
- Type: Private university
- Established: 2010; 16 years ago
- President: Osman Elhassan
- Rector: Abdul-Wahab Ahmad
- Location: Khartoum, Khartoum state, Sudan
- Campus: Urban
- Colors
- Website: www.mu.edu.sd

AlMughtaribeen University (formally shorted to MU) or Expatriate University (Arabic:جامعة المغتربين) is a private university located in Khartoum, Sudan. It was founded by Sudanese expatriates.

== Foreword ==
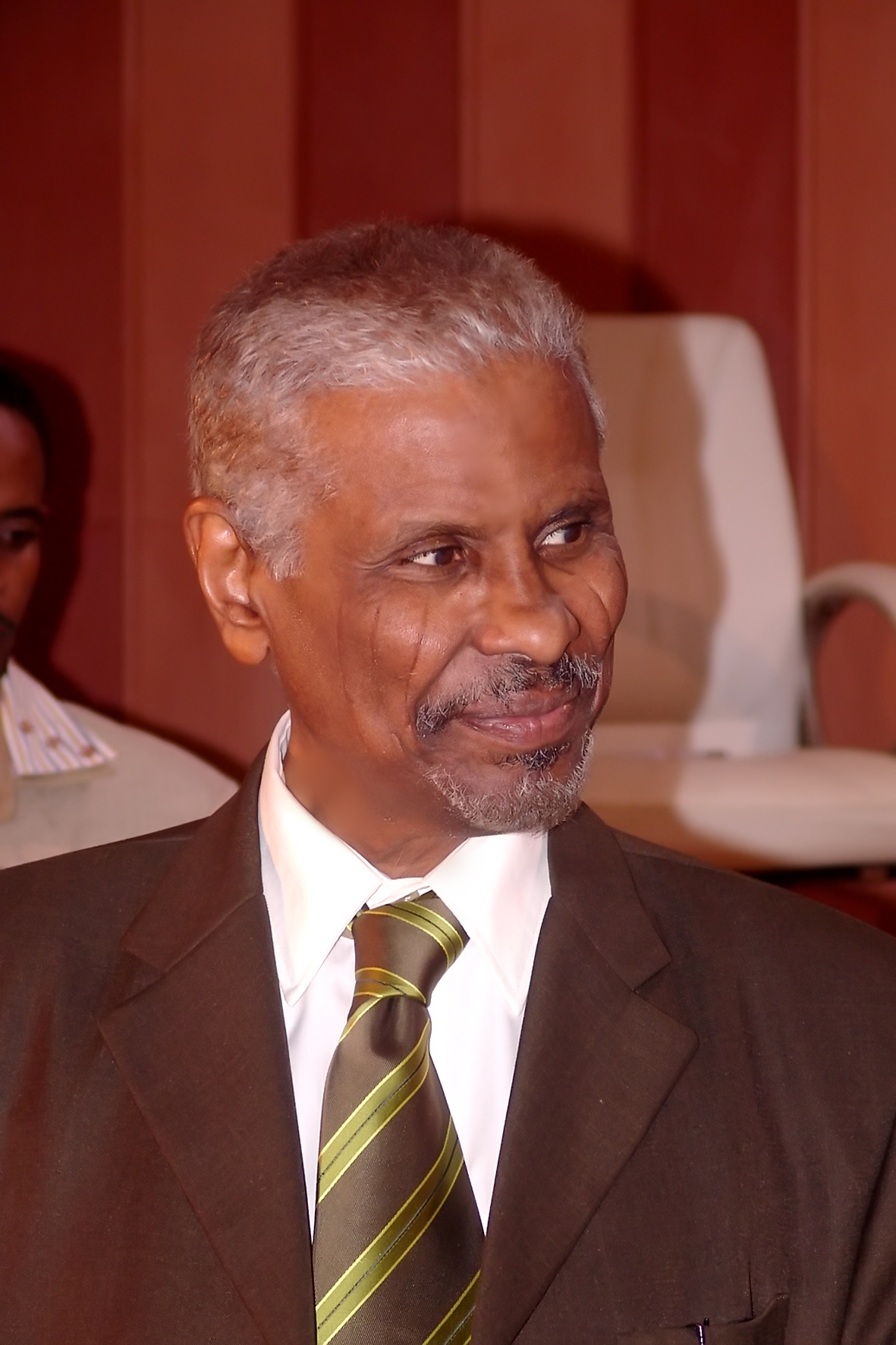
Hasan Abu-Aisha the founder president of AlMughtaribeen University

At the outset, the idea of establishing MU was initiated by a group of expatriates in the Kingdom of Saudi Arabia and it was adopted by the 4th Expatriates Conference in 2000 – under the auspices of the Sudanese Expats Organization. The National Voluntary Organization for Supporting Higher Education in Sudan – situated in Riyadh, Saudi Arabia – which consists of a group of Sudanese experts and university professors – prepared a complete study aiming at the establishment of the non-profit company to start a university. The President of Sudan Marshal Omer Al-Bashir during the 5th Expatriates Conference in 2005 gave his consent and approval of the project as it meets the demands of the large sector of the Sudanese expats.

== Study system ==
A modified credit-hour-system and the academic semester system.

== Study duration ==
- 4 years at colleges of Languages and Management.
- 5 years at colleges of Medicine and Engineering.

== Study programs ==
1. College of Administrative sciences: in the majors:

  - Bachelor of Business administration.
  - Bachelor of Accounting.
  - Bachelor of Banking & Finance.
  - Bachelor of Marketing.
  - Bachelor of Office management.

2. College of Engineering: B.Sc. (Honors) in the majors:

  - B.Sc. in Telecommunications engineering.
  - B.Sc. in Electronics engineering (Industrial Electronics).
  - B.Sc. in Electrical engineering (Control systems + Power systems).
  - B.Sc. in Civil engineering.
  - B.Sc. in Biomedical engineering.
  - B.Sc. in Architecture.

3. College of Languages B.A. in the majors:

  - B.A. in English language.
  - B.A. in Arabic language.

4. College of Medicine:

  - MB BS in Medicine.

5. College of Pharmacy:

  - BPharm in Pharmacy.

6. College of Nursing Science:

  - BSc. in Nursing Science.

7. College of Computer Science & Information Technology:

  - BSc. in computer science.
  - BSc. in information technology.
  - BSc. in software engineering.
  - BSc. in information system.
