= Al Neelain University =

University in Khartoum, Sudan

Coordinates: 15°36′7″N 32°30′54″E

- جامعة النيلين
- Former names: Cairo university - Khartoum branch
- Type: Public
- Established: 1993; 33 years ago
- Vice-Chancellor: Professor Alhadi Adam Mohammed Ibrahim
- Location: Khartoum, Sudan
- Website: www.neelain.edu.sd

Al Neelain University is a public university located in Khartoum, Sudan. It was founded in 1993. In 2012, the university had 18 faculties with a total enrollment of 47365, making it the second biggest university in Sudan. The university is a member of the Federation of the Universities of the Islamic World.

== Faculties ==
- Sciences and Technology
- Law
- Computer Sciences and Information Technology
- Medicine
- Pharmacy
- Arts
- Engineering
- Education
- Optometry and Visual Sciences
- Medical Laboratory Sciences
- Agricultural Technology and Fish Sciences
- Community Development
- Petroleum and Minerals
- Nursing Sciences
- Dentistry
- Economic and Social Studies
- Physiotherapy
- Fine Arts
- Graduate College
- Commerce
- Mathematical Sciences and Statistics
- Islamic Studies

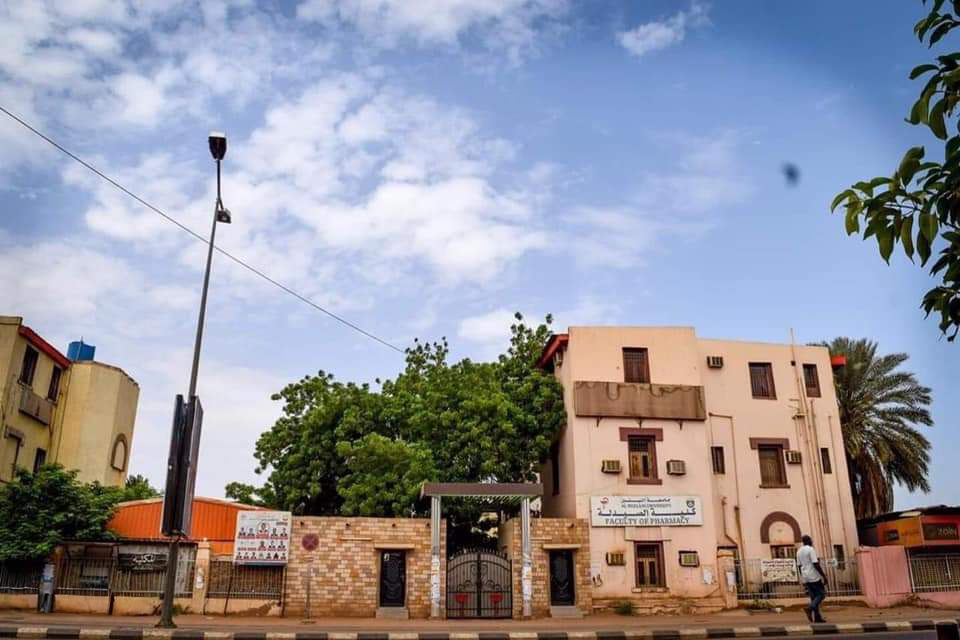
Alneelain University College of Pharmacy

== See also ==
- List of Islamic educational institutions
- Universities in Africa
