= Education in Sudan =

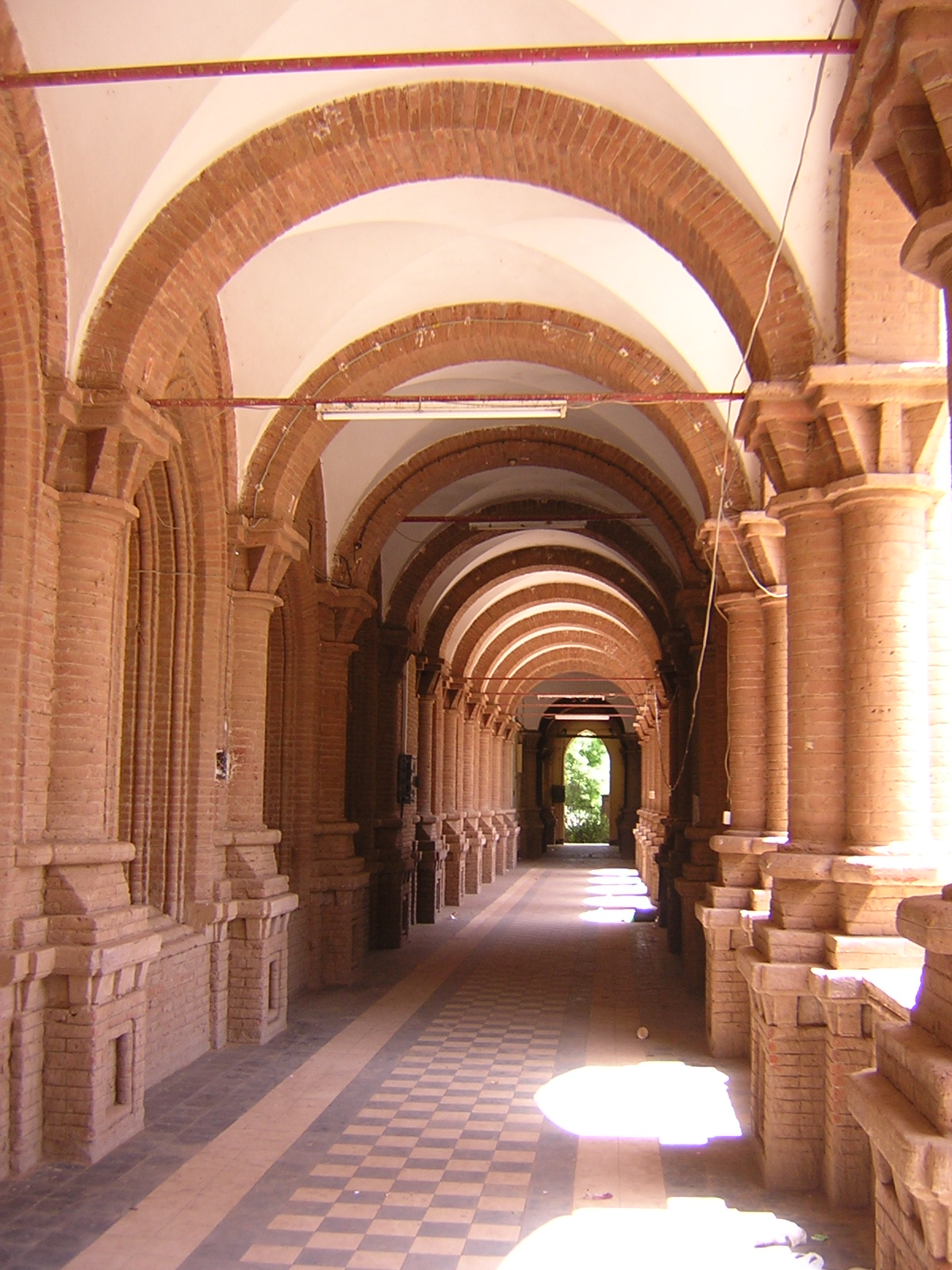
Faculty of Science, University of Khartoum, Sudan established by the British colonial authorities

Education in Sudan is free and compulsory for children aged 6 to 13 years. Primary education up to the 2019/2020 academic year consists of eight years, followed by three years of secondary education. The primary/secondary educational ladder of 6+3+3 years was switched in 1965 and during the Omar al-Bashir presidency to 8+3 and is scheduled, during the 2019 Sudanese transition to democracy, to return to 6+3+3 in the 2020/2021 academic year. The primary language at all levels is Arabic. Starting in the 2020/2021 academic year, English is to be taught starting at kindergarten. Schools are concentrated in urban areas; many in the South and West were damaged or destroyed by years of civil war. In 2001 the World Bank estimated that primary enrolment was 46 percent of eligible pupils and 21 percent of secondary students. Enrolment varies widely, falling below 20 percent in some provinces. Sudan has 36 government universities and 19 private universities, in which instruction is primarily in Arabic.

Education at the secondary and university levels is seriously hampered by the requirement that most males perform military service before completing their education. During the 2019 Sudanese transition to democracy, the percentage of the national budget spent on education is planned to increase from the al-Bashir 2018 value of 3 percent to 20 percent.

The literacy rate in 2018 was 60.7% of total population, male: 65.4%, female: 56.1%.

The Human Rights Measurement Initiative (HRMI) finds that Sudan is fulfilling only 42.3% of what it should be fulfilling for the right to education based on the country's level of income. HRMI breaks down the right to education by looking at the rights to both primary education and secondary education. While taking into consideration Sudan's income level, the nation is achieving 47.0% of what should be possible based on its resources (income) for primary education but only 37.6% for secondary education.

== History of education in Sudan ==
=== Egyptian rule and the Mahdist period ===
Village Koranic schools, or khalawi, were established in the 13th and 14th centuries when the region was undergoing Islamization. In the 1850s, the Turks, who were ruling Sudan through the Khedive of Egypt, decided to open five schools in different towns in northern Sudan. These taught Islamic studies, arithmetic, and the Arabic and Turkish languages. The teachers in the schools were Egyptians. The schools were all destroyed during the Mahdist period between 1881-1898. Thus, prior to 1898, the only educational facilities remaining in the Sudan were the kahlawi in the Muslim north.

=== The condominium, 1898–1956 ===
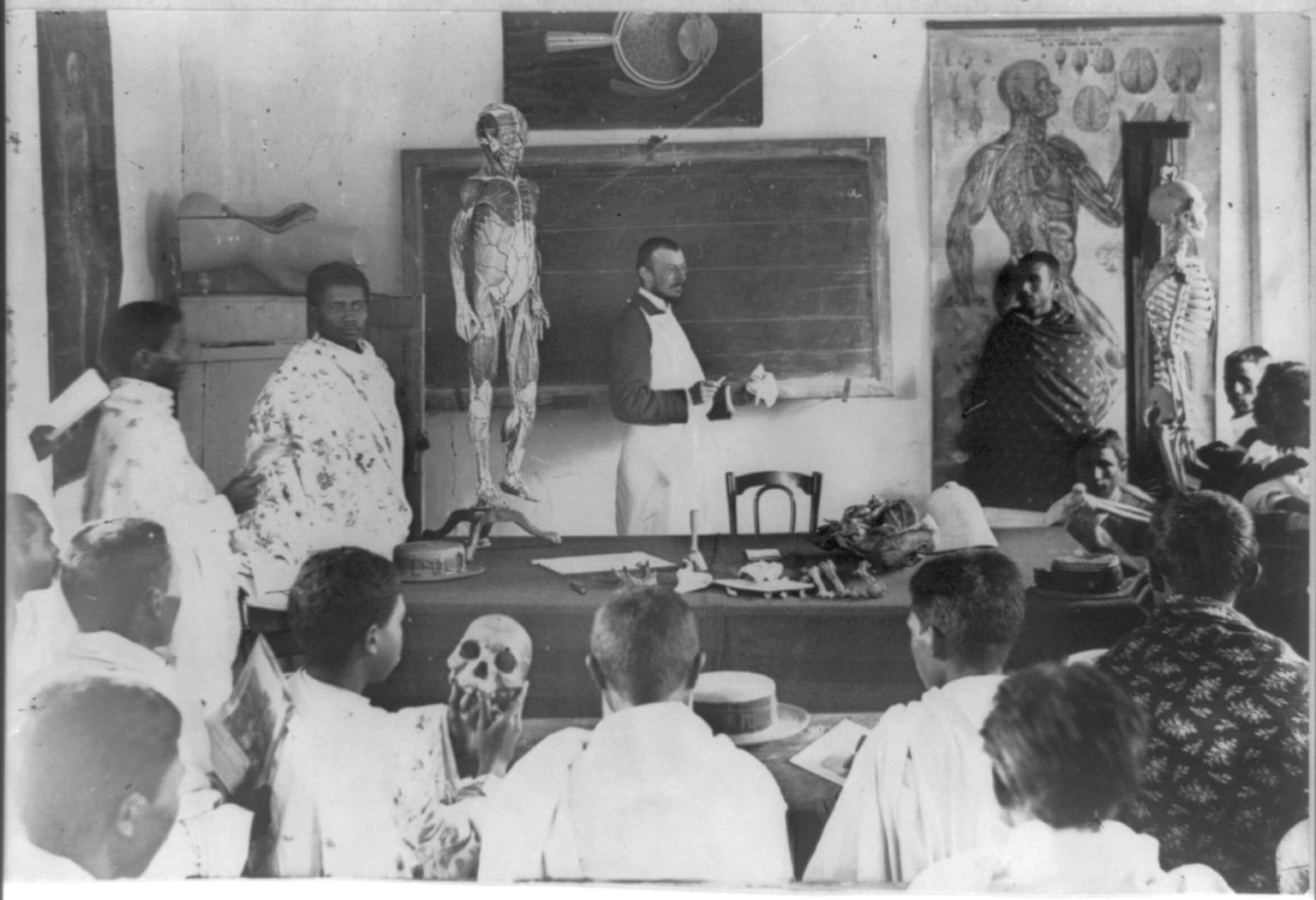
Anatomy class around 1900

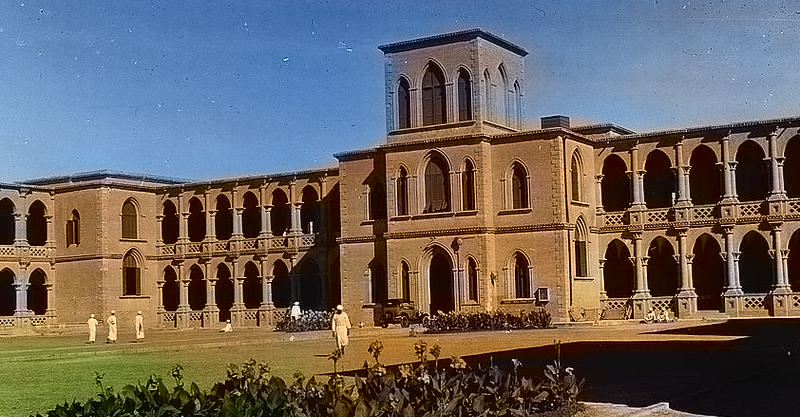
Gordon College in Khartoum, 1936

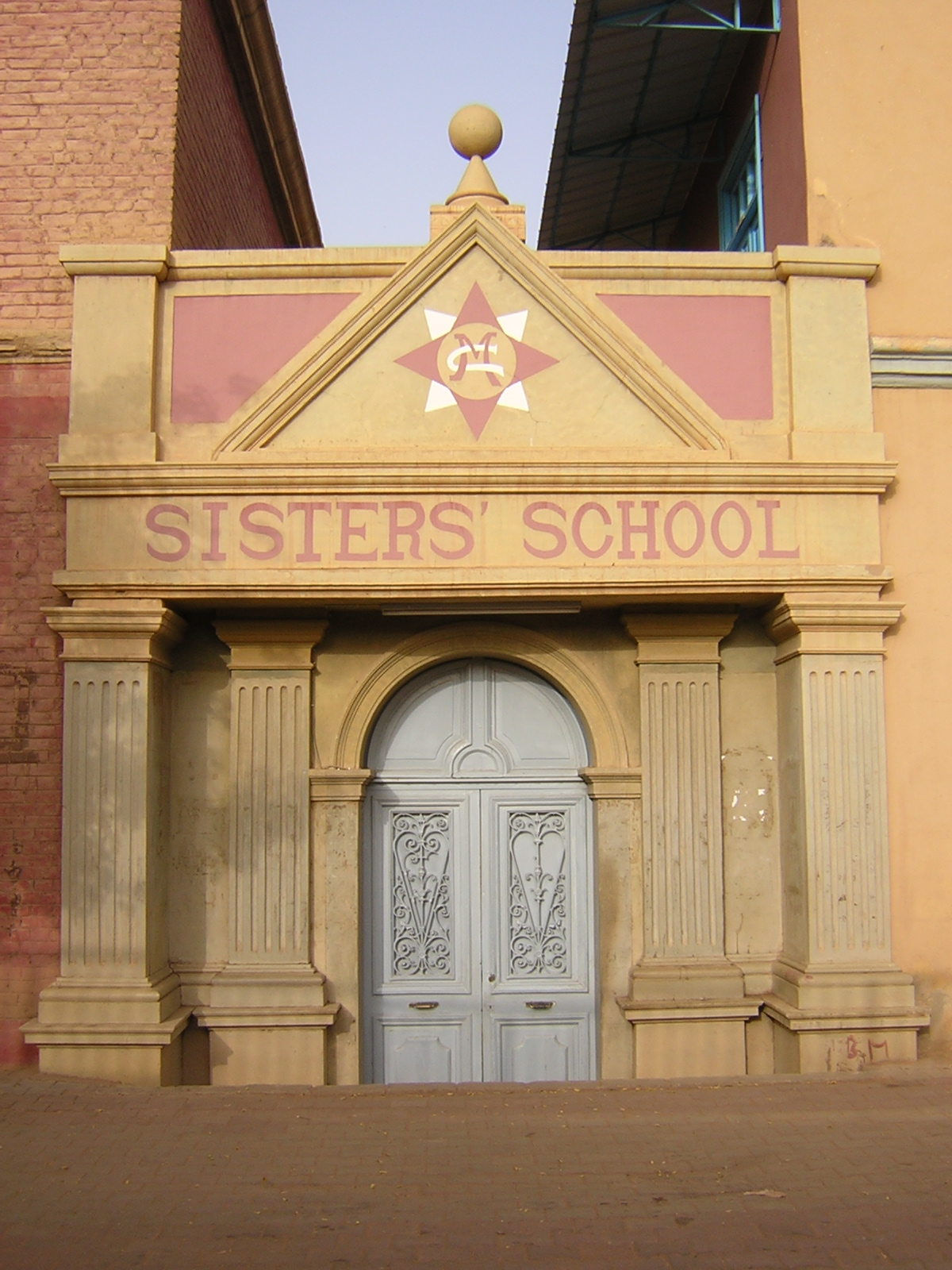
Sisters' School (Khartoum)

Following the establishment of the condominium, the policy was to gradually Sudanize the administration in the Sudan, replacing the Lebanese and Egyptians who had previously held official posts. Lord Cromer in 1903 defined the policy clearly, and also insisted that education policy should concentrate on a basic elementary education for the masses. With this in mind, in 1900 the colonial authorities started to create a school system, geared to provide Sudanese officials for the lower grades of the administration, and decided to appoint as many Sudanese as possible to posts not requiring education. They made efforts to reopen as many kuttabs as possible, by giving subsidies to teachers. Instructional workshops were set up at Kassala, Omdurman, and at the Gordon College. But higher class Sudanese refused to send their children to these workshops. So four government primary schools were created. By 1914 the policy was working, and the students from these schools were filling the lower ranks of the administration, including the sons of the three Kalifahs and various Mahdist Amirs. For higher education, the Gordon Memorial College was founded by the British in Khartoum in 1920 and the Islamic Omdurman Scientific Institute was founded in 1912.

Major academic libraries include the University of khartoum library... However, this all concerned education for boys. It was in 1907 that education for girls began on the initiative of Sheikh Babikr Bedri at Rufa`a in the Blue Nile province. Eventually this, too, received a government subsidy.

In the 1930s and 1940s there was an expansion in secondary schools in the northern Sudan. In 1938 the decision was taken to provide post-secondary schooling, leading towards the establishment of a university. In 1944 these schools were amalgamated to form a university, offering degrees equivalent to a United Kingdom degree.

Between 1898 and 1930, the condominium government policy in the South was simply to maintain a basic military control of the area, which otherwise remained undeveloped. The Christian missionary societies were allowed to establish schools in the south, but not in the north. Up to 1922, the development of schools in the south was entirely in the hands of the missionaries. Although the government made clear a wish that the schools should focus on social and educational work rather than conversion, the distinction was in practice meaningless. In 1922 the government began to give some financial assistance to the missionary schools, and substantially increased it from 1926. The objective was to train southerners to be suitable for government employment as clerks, teachers, minor officials etc., and government inspectors were appointed to assist with the task. The first government school opened in 1940. Education was in local languages at primary level, and in English at higher level.

In 1947 there were 70,457 students at government schools and 14,369 students and non-government schools in the north. There were 19.195 students at schools in the south.

=== Independence and after ===
The school system was in good shape at independence, and the new government continued to create new schools and universities.

In 1989 there were five public universities and two private universities in Sudan.

=== The Bashir government ===
In September 1990 the Bashir government decided to Islamize the schools, backed by the leaders of the Muslim Brotherhood and Islamic teachers and administrators, who were the strongest supporters of the regime.

A Muslim curriculum was devised and imposed on all schools, colleges and universities. It consisted of two parts, the first obligatory for all students and the second optional. All the essential elements of the obligatory course would be drawn from the Quran and the recognized books of the hadith. The optional course of study would permit the student to select certain specializations according to individual aptitudes and inclinations. In addition, membership in the Popular Defense Forces, a paramilitary body allied to the National Islamic Front, became a requirement for university admission.

Within a year the government ordered that Arabic should be used as the language of instruction, replacing English. It also dismissed around seventy faculty members of the University of Khartoum, who were opposed to the new policy. It also ordered that the number of university students should be doubled, and that many new universities should be opened.

These changes were very unwelcome in the South and contributed to turn the insurgency in the south into a real civil war. In consequence educational facilities in the South have largely disappeared.

Graduation ceremony at Garden City college, 2013

By 2006 there were 27 public universities, 5 private universities, 9 public technical colleges, and 46 private colleges. The IAU World Higher Education Database 2006 indicates that the number of students rose from 6,080 in 1989 to 38,623 in 1999/2000, an increase of 535%. Total tertiary enrollment in 2000 was 204,114 students, of which 47% were female. The World Bank estimated in 2018 that more than 40% of children aged 5–13 had no education.

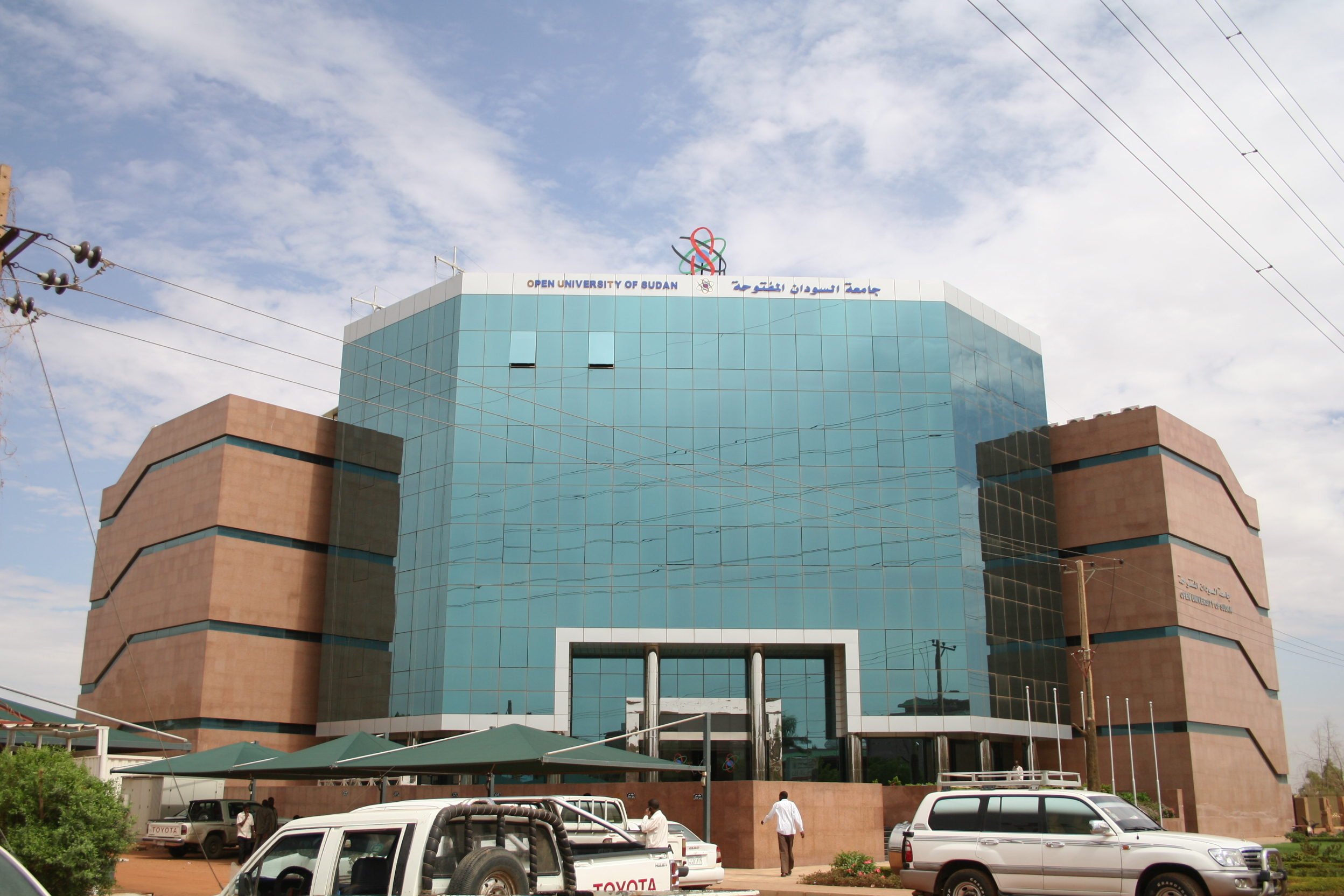
Open University of Sudan

=== Hamdok government ===
During the 2019 Sudanese transition to democracy that is scheduled to complete the institutional transitions of the 2018–2019 Sudanese Revolution, the percentage of the national budget allocated to education was planned to increase by a factor of nearly seven, from the al-Bashir era of 3 percent in 2018 to 20 percent.

In 2020, the World Bank granted $61.5 million to improve education in Sudan. Still, about seven million children, roughly one in three, lacked access to quality education or were dropping out. The 2023 conflict in Sudan heavily disrupted education, leaving millions of school-aged children without schooling.

== Levels of education ==
Progression through the Sudanese educational system is structured as follows.

First: kindergarten and day-care. It begins in the age of 3-4, consists of 1-2 grades, (depending on the parents).

Second: elementary school. First grade pupils enter at the age of 6-7. During the al-Bashir presidency, this consisted 8 years of schooling, which is to be changed to 6 years starting in the 2020/2021 academic year. Under the system finishing in the 2019/2020 school year, by the eighth grade, a student is 13–14 years old and ready to take the certificate exams and enter high school.

Third: middle school. Starting in the 2020/2021 academic year, this is scheduled to last 3 years.

Third (to 2019/2020 inclusive): upper second school and high school. At this level the school methods add some main academic subjects such as chemistry, biology, physics, geography, etc... there are three grades in this level. The students ages are about 14-15 to 17-18.

Fourth (from 2020/2021): Starting in the 2020/2021 academic year, this is scheduled to last 3 years.

== Higher education ==
Sudan in 2005 was home to 27 public universities and at least 46 private universities and colleges, the vast majority of them in the North. These institutions enrolled 447,000 students, 69,000 of whom completed their studies. Comparable figures for 1997–98 were 152,000 students and 26,000 graduates (public institutions only). In 2007–8, more than 50,000 students graduated from public universities. The Ministry of Higher Education reported that in 2009–10, about 513,000 students were attending public and private universities. Before 2005, instruction was solely in Arabic with few exceptions, among which was the University of Juba; teaching in English there recommenced as stipulated in the peace agreement of 2005. Admission was open to students with the highest scores on the Sudan School Certificate examination, which was administered at the conclusion of secondary school. Males usually had to serve in the military before they could enter the university. These requirements, along with the country’s overall poverty, constrained university enrollment.

Sudan’s first university, the University of Khartoum, opened in 1902. It began as Gordon Memorial College, a secondary school, and then became affiliated with the University of London in 1937, offering bachelor’s degrees. In 1956, at independence, it became a fully independent degree-granting institution. The University of Khartoum, with four campuses, remained the country’s flagship university, but even it was not immune to the pressures of politics and war. About 70 faculty who opposed al-Bashir’s Islamist reforms were dismissed in the early 1990s, and in January 1997, the university closed temporarily to allow students to join the armed forces.

Most observers agreed that by the early 2000s, this once-elite institution in Africa had become a mere shadow of its former self. Successive purges of the faculty following the 1964, 1969, and 1989 “revolutions” had deprived the campus of some of its best talent. Lowered standards in secondary schools as a result of the “socialist” experiment in the 1970s, combined with the disappearance of English as the language of instruction in secondary and university systems after 1990, continued to reduce the quality of incoming students. These developments at the nation’s premier university were replicated throughout the higher education establishment.

Higher education was primarily the domain of Northern Sudanese after independence, particularly those living in the capital region. In the mid-1970s, there were four universities, 11 colleges, and 23 institutes in Sudan. The universities were in the capital area, and all institutions of higher learning were in the North. Colleges in Sudan were specialized degree-granting entities; institutes granted diplomas and certificates for periods of study shorter than those commonly demanded at universities and colleges. These postsecondary institutions and universities had provided Sudan with a substantial number of well-educated persons in some fields but left it short of technical personnel and specialists in sciences relevant to the country’s largely rural character. By 1980 two new universities had opened, one at Wad Madani (University of Gezira) and the other in Juba. By 1990 some institutes had been upgraded to colleges, and many had become part of an autonomous body called the Khartoum Institute of Technical Colleges (also referred to as Khartoum Polytechnic). Some of its affiliates were outside the capital area, for example, the College of Mechanical Engineering at Atbarah, northeast of Khartoum, and Al-Gezira College of Agriculture and Natural Resources at Abu Naamah in Al-Awsat.

The 1990s saw a major expansion of higher education in regions outside the traditional Northern hub. A number of new universities were established, among them Kordofan, Darfur, Blue Nile (at Al-Damazin), Bahr al-Ghazal, Upper Nile, and Al-Imam Al-Mahdi (at Kosti). In a parallel development, a number of provincial colleges were upgraded to university status, including those at Nyala, Dongola, Port Sudan, Kassala, and Al-Gedaref. In 1993 Al-Neelain University was created when the Sudanese government took over the former Khartoum branch of Cairo University, originally founded in 1955. In August 2006, however, ground was broken in Khartoum for a new campus of Cairo University.

Various institutions were designed for specific training. The Islamic University of Omdurman, founded in 1921, existed primarily to train Muslim religious judges and scholars. The Al-Gezira College of Agriculture and Natural Resources, set in Sudan’s most fertile agricultural region, focused on protecting and utilizing Sudan’s environmental resources. Ahfad University for Women in Omdurman was the premier women’s education institution in Sudan. Of particular interest is the case of Omdurman Ahlia University. Academics, professionals, and businessmen founded it in 1982 to meet the ever-growing demand for higher education and practical training. Support came mainly from private donations and foreign foundations as well as from the government. Its curriculum, taught in English and oriented to job training pertinent to the needs of Sudan, proved popular.

The expansion of higher education in the 1990s was not accompanied by an increase in funding; hence, the share of funds allocated to each institution was less than what was needed for full operation. Consequently, buildings, laboratories, libraries, and other facilities deteriorated seriously, especially at older institutions, along with the qualifications of the student body. The impact of Arabization and Islamization of the universities’ curricula produced a preoccupation among students with the passing of examinations rather than with the development of skills of analysis and critical thinking. The economic surge resulting from petroleum exports gave hope that these trends might be reversed. In addition, after the signing of the CPA in 2005, there was some improvement in the relationship between the government and the faculty and students in the universities.

== Educational opportunity ==
As of 2011, the government provided free primary education for children aged six to 14, at least in theory. School closings resulted from civil conflict. Still, some encouraging trends emerged. In 1996, for example, only 44 percent of the age-relevant population attended school in Sudan. More boys (47 percent) than girls (40 percent) attended school at this point. The World Bank estimated the primary-school enrollment rate at 60 percent in 2004, with a 49-percent completion rate; comparable figures for 2000 were 51 percent enrollment and 39 percent completion. Secondary enrollment in 2004 was 33 percent compared with 26 percent in 2000. However, data from a 2006 household health survey in North and South Sudan showed that only 53.7 percent of children were attending primary school. Unfortunately, many students came to school or not as their situations allowed, and perhaps half or more were unable to complete the education program mandated by the national government. For the period 1998-2001, the UN reported that 80 percent of eligible children in what was then the North attended elementary school.

Other initiatives aimed specifically at expanding educational opportunity were part of Sudan's planning. First, the government started to respond to the education needs that stemmed from internal displacement. With the help of international organizations, displaced students began to receive education in their temporary communities. A second program was designed to address the problem of education among nomadic groups, at least 80 of which still existed in Sudan. Many resided in North Kordofan State, where most primary schools, supported with UN funds, went only through fourth grade. In 2009 Sudanese education officials began a shift from mobile schools to stationary schools, including boarding schools, for the estimated 500,000 nomadic children of primary age in the North. They hoped to increase enrollment from 32 percent to 70 percent by 2011, improve the relevance of the curriculum, and provide more trained teachers. A third initiative, also launched in 2009, aimed at increasing the enrollment of girls in primary schools in the North by more than 1 million by 2011.

=== Khalwas ===
In 2020 there were more than 30,000 khalwas, or religious schools, usually run by sheik in which children are taught to memorise the Qur'an. The schools provide free meals, drink and accommodation and often poor families send their children there rather than to public schools. A two-year investigation made by Fateh al-Rahman al-Hamdani during 2018–2019 into 23 khalwa schools, with the support of BBC News Arabic, documented evidence of chaining, beatings, torture and sexual abuse. Al-Hamdani published his findings as a documentary film in October 2020. By December 2020, the film had led to a major public reaction in Sudan, with legislative changes and governmental promises of prosecutions. However a follow-up report by Al-Hamdani in December 2020 found the government had been slow to respond and there had been little real change.

== Female education ==
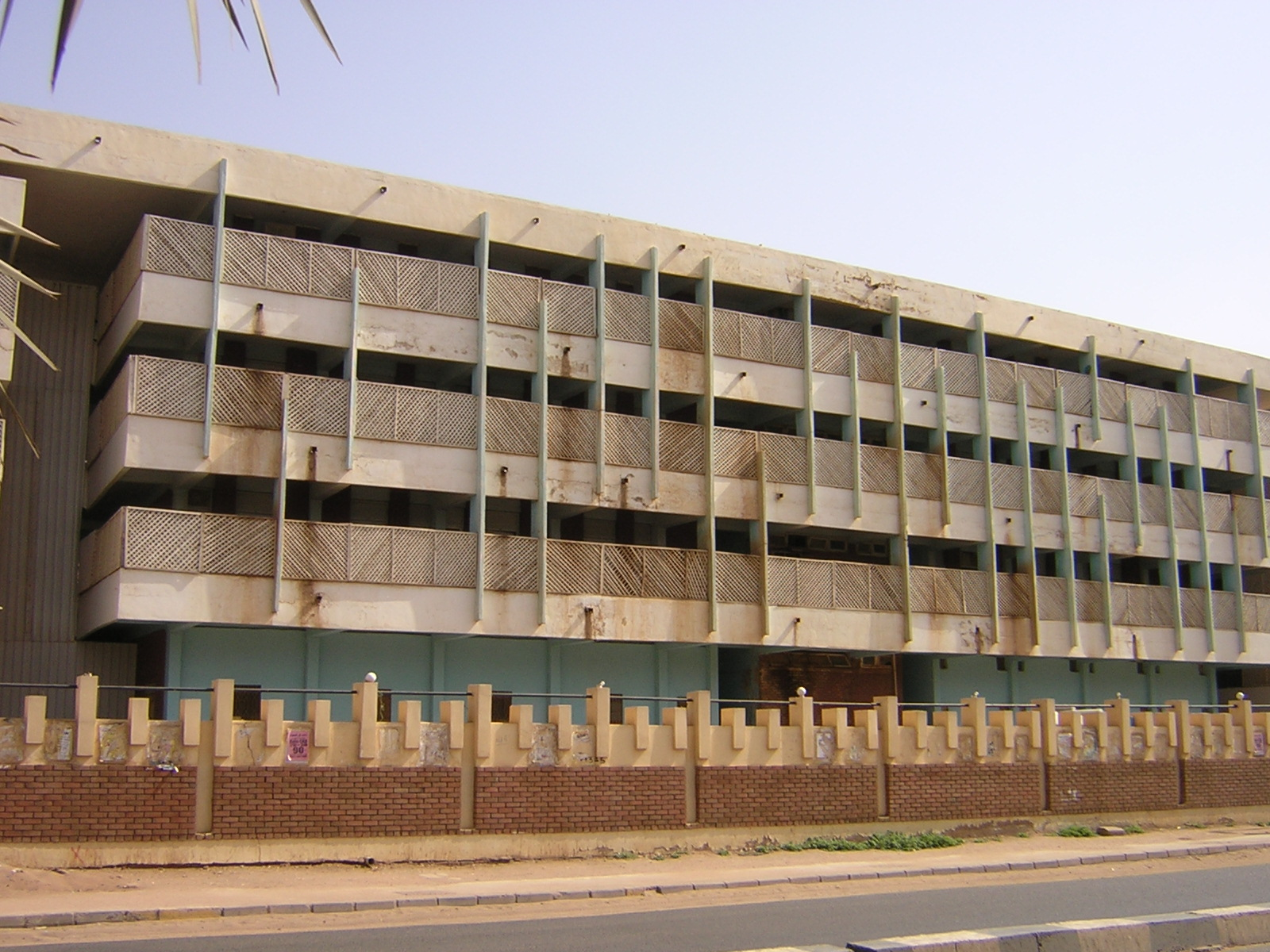
Female student dormitory, University of Khartoum, 2009

Girls’ education was traditionally of the most rudimentary kind, frequently provided in Muslim areas by a khalwa, or religious school, in which Quranic studies were taught. Such basic schools did not prepare girls for the secular learning mainstream, from which they were virtually excluded. In 1902 the Coptic community in Khartoum opened a private school for girls which later became the Unity High School in Khartoum. By 1920 the government had provided five elementary schools for girls. Expansion was slow, however, and female education remained restricted to the elementary level until 1940, when the first intermediate school for girls, the Omdurman Girls' Intermediate School, opened. By 1955 there were 10 such schools. In 1956 the Omdurman Secondary School for Girls, with about 265 students, was the only girls’ secondary school operated by the government. By 1960 there were only two upper-secondary schools for girls and no vocational schools except for the Nurses' Training College with just 11 students, nursing not being regarded by many Sudanese as a suitable vocation for women.

This slow development of girls’ education was the product of tradition. Parents of Sudanese girls tended to look upon girls’ schools with suspicion, if not fear, that they would corrupt the morals of their daughters. Moreover, preference was given to sons, who, if educated, could advance themselves in society to the pride and profit of the family, something girls could not do. Their value was enhanced not at school but at home in preparation for marriage and the dowry that accompanied the ceremony. Finally, the lack of schools discouraged even those who desired elementary education for their daughters.

Female education claimed approximately one-third of all available educational resources by 1970, when there were 1,086 primary schools, 268 intermediate schools, and 52 vocational schools for girls. Among notable successes with female education was Ahfad University for Women in Omdurman. Originally founded in 1907 as a primary school for girls, in the early 2000s it was the oldest and largest private university in Sudan, having evolved into the premier women’s university with an enrollment approaching 5,000 in 2006. It offered a mixture of academic and practical programs, such as those that educated women to teach in rural areas. The newly wealthy elites considered Ahfad as the first choice for their daughters, and its graduates often went on to advanced studies abroad. Stipends were also available to women students of modest means, a step toward improving access by females to education at all levels.

== See also ==
- List of universities in Sudan

== Sources ==
- Mongabay.com article on education since independence
- Mohammed H. Fadlalla, Short history of Sudan. Google books preview here
- El Mahdi, Mandour. (1965). A Short History of the Sudan. Oxford University Press.
- Bedri, Y. (Translator) & P. Hogg. (1980). The Memoirs of Babikr Bedri. Vol. 2. London: Ithaca Press. Babikr's own account of his work in Women's education can be found in vol. 2, pp. 109–70.
- Hassan Ahmed Ibrahim, A study of neo-Mahdism in the Sudan, 1899-1956.
