= List of forestry universities and colleges =

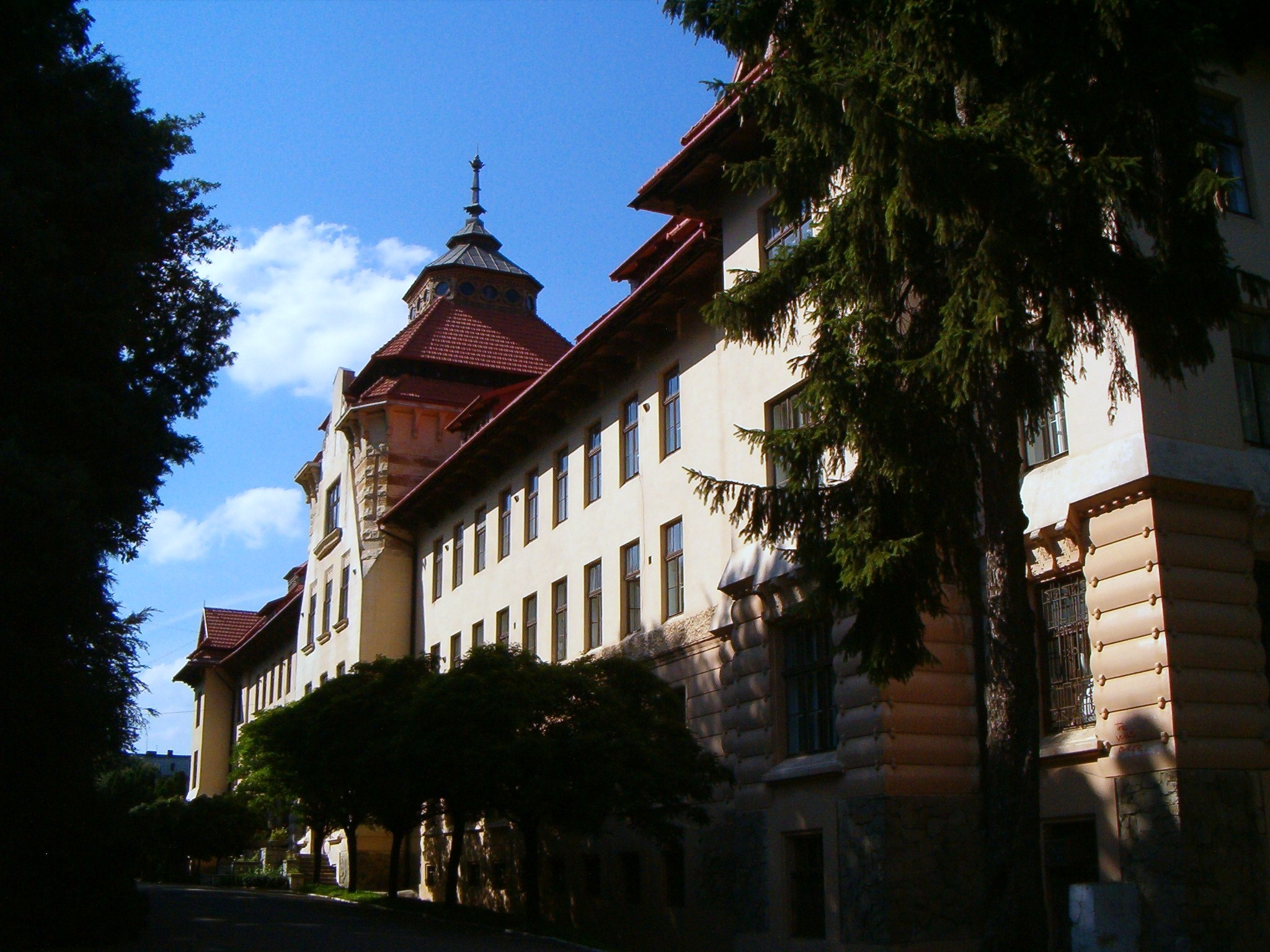
National Forestry University of Ukraine

This is a list of tertiary educational institutions around the world offering bachelor's, master's or doctoral degrees in forestry, agronomy, animal sciences, or related fields. Where noted, the country's accreditation board standard has been used and cited. They are grouped by colleges.

== Africa ==
=== Algeria ===
- Abou Bakr Belkaïd University - Tlemcen

=== Benin ===
- Faculty of Agronomic Sciences, National University of Benin
- National School of wildlife and Protected Areas Management of Kandi, University of Parakou
- Faculty of Agronomy, University of Parakou

=== Burkina Faso ===
- Institute of Rural Development (IDR), Polytechnic University of Bobo-Dioulasso
- Life and Earth Sciences (UFR/SVT), University of Ouagadougou

=== Cameroon ===
- The National Forestry School of Cameroon, location: Mbalmayo, the centre region of Cameroon

French Abbre.: Ecole Nationale des Eaux et Forêts de Mbalmayo

=== Côte d'Ivoire ===
- College of Agronomy, Félix Houphouët-Boigny National Polytechnic Institute, Yamoussoukro

=== Egypt ===
- Forestry and Wood Technology Department, Faculty of Agriculture, Alexandria University.

=== Ethiopia ===
- Burie College of Forestry, Debremarkos University
- Haramaya College of Forestry, Haramaya University
- Wollo University
- Wondo Genet College of Forestry and Natural Resources, Hawassa University

=== Ghana ===
- Department of Renewable Natural Resources, University for Development Studies
- Kwame Nkrumah University of Science and Technology
  - Faculty of Forest Resources Technology
  - Faculty of Renewable Natural Resources
  - Department of Wood Science and Technology
- School of Natural Resources, University of Energy and Natural Resources,

=== Guinea ===
- Higher Institute of Agronomy and Veterinary Studies, Faranah

=== Kenya ===
- Department of Forestry, University of Eldoret
- Kenya Forestry College (Londiani)
- Kenya Forestry Research Institute

=== Madagascar ===
- Department of Water and Forests, School of Agronomy, University of Antananarivo

=== Malawi ===
- Malawi College of Forestry and Wildlife (Certificate and Diploma Program) https://sites.google.com/view/malawicollegeforestrywildlife/home
- Bunda College of Agriculture, University of Malawi
- Department of Forestry, Mzuzu University

=== Morocco ===
- National School for Forest Engineers (ENFI Rabat-Salé)

=== Mozambique ===
- Department of Forestry Eduardo Mondlane University

=== Nigeria ===
- Department of Forestry and Wildlife Resources Management, Cross River University of Technology
- Department of Forestry and Wildlife, Delta State University, Abraka
- Department of Forest Resources and Wildlife Management, Ekiti State University, Ado Ekiti
- Department of Forestry Technology, Federal College of Forestry, Ibadan
- Department of Forestry and Wood Technology, Federal University of Technology Akure
- Department of and Wildlife Technology, Federal University of Technology, Owerri
- Department of Forestry and Environmental Management, Michael Okpara University of Agriculture, Umudike
- Department of Forestry and Wildlife Management, University of Agriculture, Abeokuta
- Department of Forest Production and Products, University of Agriculture, Makurdi
- Department of Forestry and Wildlife, University of Benin
- Department of Forestry and Wildlife Resources Management, University of Calabar, Calabar
- Department of Forest Resources Management, University of Ibadan
- Department of Forest Resources Management, University of Ilorin
- Department of Forestry and Wildlife, University of Maiduguri
- Department of Forestry and Wildlife Management, University of Port Harcourt
- Forestry and Wildlife, University of Uyo
- Forestry and Wildlife, Uthman dan Fodiyo University, Sokoto

=== Senegal ===
- Institute of Environmental Sciences, Cheikh Anta Diop University
- Ecole Nationale Supérieure d'Agriculture de Thiès (ENSA), University of Thiès, Thiès

=== South Africa ===
- Department of Forest and Wood Science, Faculty of AgriSciences, University of Stellenbosch
- Department of Forestry, Fort Cox Agriculture and Forestry Training Institute, Middledrift
- Department of Forestry, School of Agriculture, University of Venda, Thohoyandou
- Forest Science Postgraduate Program, University of Pretoria
- School of Natural Resource Management, Nelson Mandela University, George (Western Cape) campus

=== Sudan ===
- College of Forestry and Range Science, Sudan University of Science and Technology
- College of Natural Resources and Environmental Studies, University of Juba
- Faculty of Forestry, University of Khartoum
- Faculty of Forestry and Range Science, Upper Nile University
- Faculty of Natural Resources and Environmental Studies, University of Kordofan

=== Tanzania ===
- Beekeeping Training Institute, Tabora
- Forestry Industries Training Institute
- Faculty of Forestry and Nature Conservation, Sokoine University of Agriculture
- Forestry Training Institute, Olmotonyi
- Institute of Resources Assessment, University of Dar es Salaam

=== Tunisia ===
- School of Rural Development, Water, and Forests, National Agricultural Institute of Tunisia
- Silvopastoral Institute of Tabarka

=== Uganda ===
- Faculty of Forestry and Nature Conservation, Makerere University
- Nyabyeya Forestry College, Masindi

=== Zambia ===
- School of Forestry and Wood Sciences, Copperbelt University
- Zambia Forestry College

=== Zimbabwe ===
- Bindura University of Science Education
- Department of Forest Resources and Wildlife Management, National University of Science and Technology, Bulawayo
- Zimbabwe College of Forestry, Mutare

== Asia ==
=== Afghanistan ===
- Department of Forestry, Bamyan University
- Department of Forestry and Natural Resources, Kabul University
- Department of Forest Sciences, Kunar University
- Department of Forestry, Paktia University
- Department of Forestry and Environmental Sciences, Laghman University
- Department of Forestry and Horticulture Sciences, Balkh University
- Department of Forestry, Badakhshan University,
- Department of Forest Sciences, Herat University

=== Bangladesh ===
- Department of Agroforestry and Environment, Bangabandhu Sheikh Mujibur Rahman Agricultural University, Dhaka
- Forestry and Wood Technology Discipline, Khulna University, Khulna
- Department of Forestry and Environmental Science, Shahjalal University of Science and Technology, Sylhet
- Institute of Forestry and Environmental Sciences, University of Chittagong, Chittagong

=== China ===
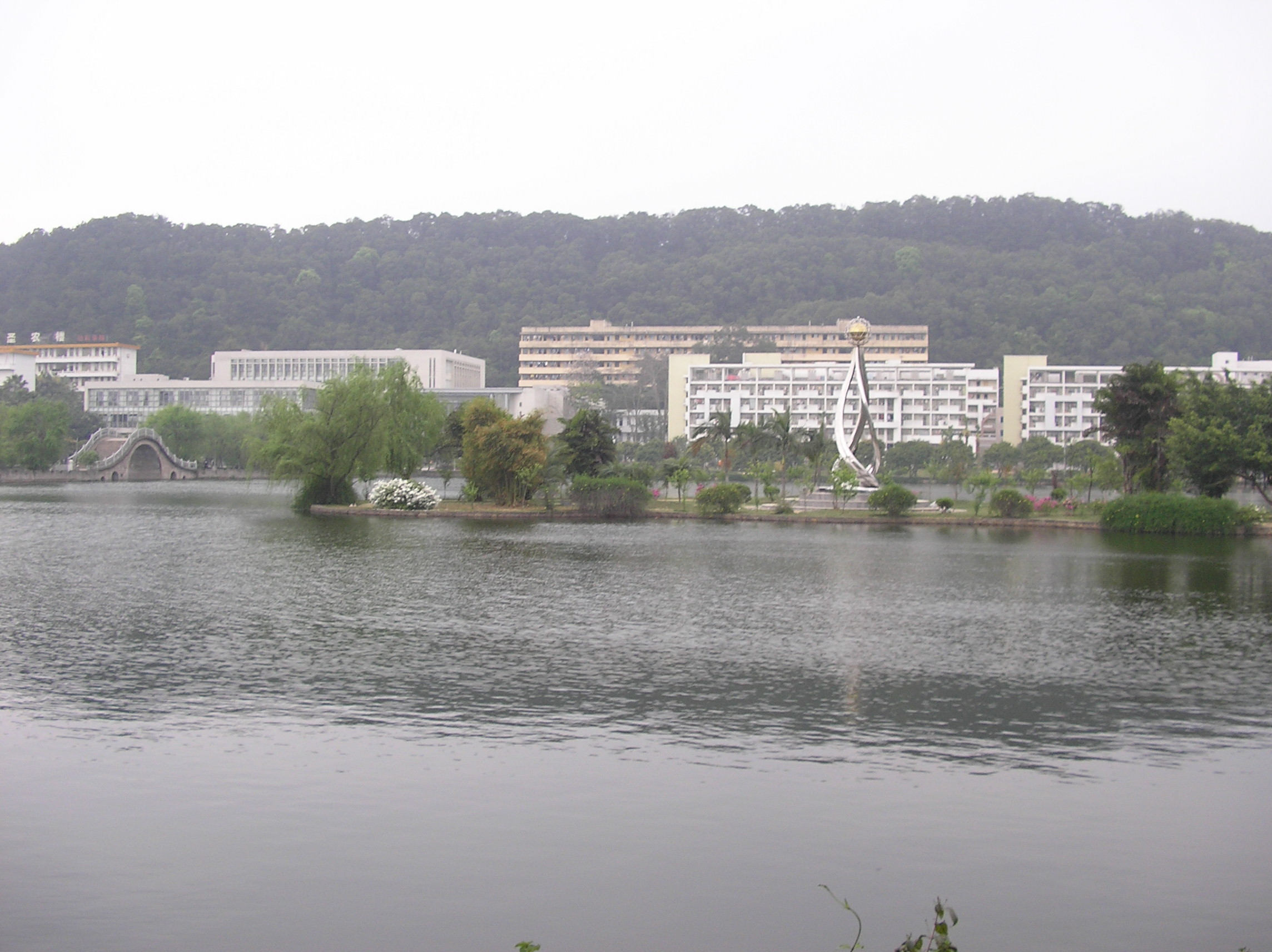
Fujian Agriculture and Forestry University

- Beijing Forestry University
- Central South University of Forestry and Technology
- College of Forestry, Guizhou University
- College of Horticulture and Forestry Sciences, Huazhong Agricultural University, Wuhan, Hubei
- College of Forestry and Horticulture, Henan Agricultural University
- Fujian Agriculture and Forestry University
- Nanjing Forestry University
- North West A&F University
- Northeast Forestry University
- Sichuan Agricultural University
- Southwest Forestry University
- Zhejiang Forestry University

=== India ===
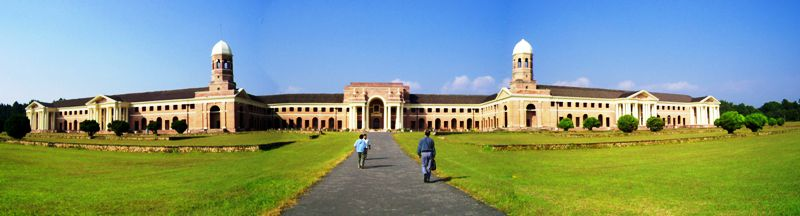
Forest Research Institute, Dehradun

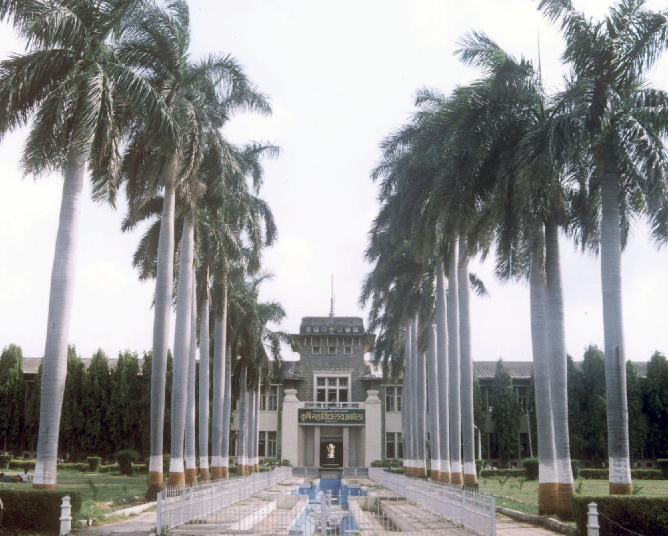
PDKV University, Akola

- Forest Research Institute, Dehradun, Uttarakhand [ICFRE (An autonomous government body governed by Ministry of Environment Forest and Climate Change)].
- Faculty of Forestry, Benhama, Ganderbal, SKUAST-K, Jammu and Kashmir.
- College of Horticulture and Forestry, Central Agricultural University, Pasighat, Arunachal Pradesh
- College of Horticulture and Forestry, Punjab Agricultural University, Ludhiana
- College of Forestry, Dr. Balasaheb Sawant Konkan Krishi Vidyapeeth University (BSKKV), Dapoli, Maharashtra
- College of Forestry, Odisha University of Agriculture and Technology, Bhubaneswar, Odisha
- College of Forestry, Kerala Agricultural University
- College of Forestry, Ponnampet, UAHS, Shimoga
- College of Forestry, Sirsi, University of Agricultural Sciences, Dharwad
- College of Forestry and Hill Agriculture, Ranichauri, G. B. Pant University of Agriculture and Technology, Pantnagar now with VCSG University of Horticulture & Forestry, Bharsar, Uttarakhand
- College of Horticulture and Forestry, Maharana Pratap University, Jhalawar, Rajasthan now with Agriculture University, Kota, Rajasthan
- Department of Applied Science, North Eastern Regional Institute of Science and Technology (NERIST), Nirjuli, Arunachal Pradesh
- Department of Ecology and Environmental Science, Assam University, Silchar, Assam
- Department of Forestry, School of Earth Sciences and Natural Resources Management, Tanhril, Aizawl, Mizoram
- Department of Forest Sciences, Desh Bhagat University (DBU), Mandi Gobindgarh, Punjab
- Department of Forestry, Dr. Panjabrao Deshmukh Krishi Vidyapeeth University (PDKV), Akola, Maharashtra
- Department of Forestry, Wildlife and Environmental Sciences, Guru Ghasidas University, Bilaspur, Chhattisgarh
- Department of Forestry, Hemwati Nandan Bahuguna Garhwal University, Srinagar, Uttarakhand
- Department of Forestry, Jawaharlal Nehru Agricultural University, Jabalpur, Madhya Pradesh
- Department of Forestry, Birsa Agricultural University, Ranchi, Jharkhand
- Aspee College of Forestry and Horticulture, Navsari Agricultural University, Navsari, Gujarat
- Dr. Yashwant Singh Parmar University of Horticulture and Forestry, Nauni, Solan, Himachal Pradesh
- Forest College and Research Institute, Tamil Nadu Agricultural University, Mettupalayam, Tamil Nadu
- Forest college and Research Institute, Hyderabad, Telangana.
- Indian Institute of Forest Management, Bhopal
- Department of Forestry and Biodiversity, Tripura University, Suryamaninagar, Agartala, Tripura
- College of Forestry, Banda University of Agriculture and technology Banda Uttar Pradesh India.
- Munger Forestry College, Bihar Agricultural University Sabour, Bhagalpur, Munger, Bihar, India

=== Indonesia ===
- Faculty of Agriculture, Khairun University
- Faculty of Agriculture, Padjadjaran University
- Faculty of Forestry, Bengkulu University
- Faculty of Forestry, Bogor Agricultural University
- Faculty of Forestry, Domuga Kotamubago University
- Faculty of Forestry, Gadjah Mada University
- Faculty of Forestry, Haluoleo University
- Faculty of Forestry, Hasanuddin University
- Faculty of Forestry, Institut Pertanian Stiper
- Faculty of Forestry, Kuningan University
- Faculty of Forestry, Lambung Mangkurat University
- Faculty of Forestry, Lampung University
- Faculty of Forestry, Lancang Kuning Riau University
- Faculty of Forestry, Merdeka Madiun University
- Faculty of Forestry, Muhammadiyah Malang University
- Faculty of Forestry, Muhammadiyah Sumatera Barat University
- Faculty of Forestry, Mulawarman University
- Faculty of Forestry, Negeri Papua University
- Faculty of Forestry, Nusa Bangsa University
- Faculty of Forestry, Palangkaraya University
- Faculty of Forestry, Pattimura University
- Faculty of Forestry, Sam Ratulangi University
- Faculty of Forestry, Satria University
- Faculty of Forestry Engineering, Sumatera Institute of Technology
- Faculty of Forestry, Tadulako University
- Faculty of Forestry, Tanjungpura University
- Faculty of Forestry, University of Jambi
- Faculty of Forestry, University of North Sumatra
- Faculty of Forestry, Winaya Mukti University
- School of Life Sciences and Technology, Bandung Institute of Technology

=== Iran ===
- Giulan University
- College of Agriculture, Gonbad-e Qabus
- Gorgan University of Agricultural Sciences and Natural Resources, Faculty of Forest Sciences
- Islamic Azad University of Chalous
- Islamic Azad University of Lahijan
- Islamic Azad University, Science and Research Branch, Tehran
- Kalak Natural Resources Training Center
- Kelarabad Natural Resources Training Center
- Kordestan University
- Sari Agricultural and Natural Resources University
- Semnan University, Natural Resources and Desert Study Faculties, Semnan Province
- Tarbiat Modares University
- Tehran University
- Urmia University
- Yasouj University, Agricultural and Natural Resources Department, Faculty of Forestry
- Zabol University, Department of Wood and Paper Sci.and Technol, Faculty of Natural Resources
- Shahrekord University, Faculty of Natural Resources and Earth Sciences

=== Japan ===
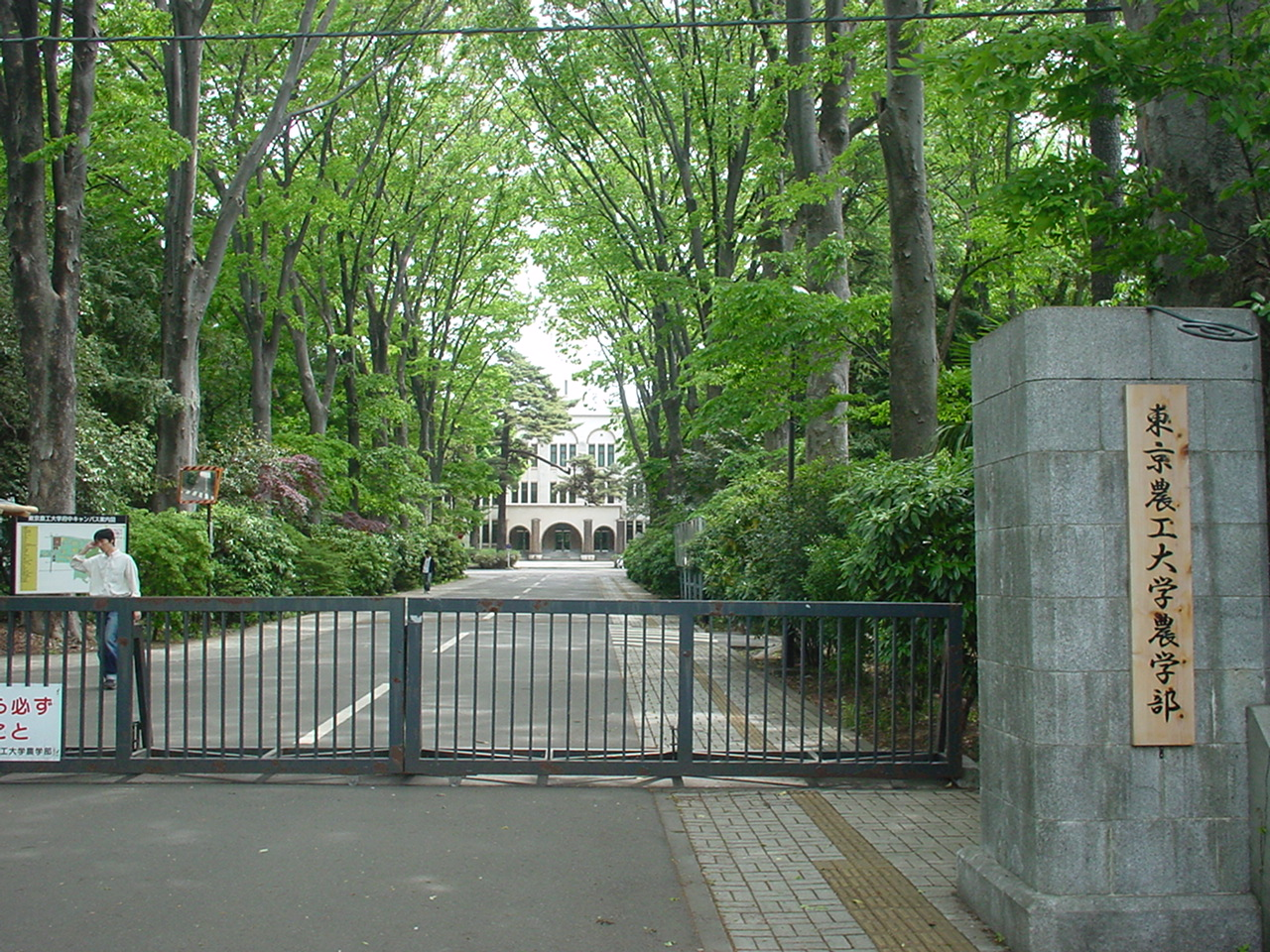
Tokyo University of Agriculture and Technology

- Department of Agriculture and Forest Science, University of Miyazaki
- Department of Forest Science, Iwate University
- Department of Forest Products, Kyushu University
- Department of Forest and Environment, Shimane University
- Department of Forest Sciences, Shinshu University
- Department of Forest Science, University of Tokyo
- Department of Forest Science, Utsunomiya University
- Division of Forest and Biomaterials Science, Kyoto University
- Tokyo University of Agriculture and Technology

=== Laos ===
- Bolikhamxay Agriculture and Forestry School
- Champasack Agriculture and Forestry School
- Champasack University
- Department of Forest Resources, Faculty of Agriculture and Forest Resources, Souphanouvong University
- Dongkhamxang School of Agriculture and Forestry
- Faculty of Forest Science, National University of Laos (NUOL)
- Louang Prabang Agriculture and Forestry School
- Muang Mai School of Forestry
- Sepone Agroforestry Training Center

=== Malaysia ===
- Forest Resource Technology, Universiti Malaysia Kelantan (UMK)
- School of International Tropical Forestry, Universiti Malaysia Sabah (UMS)
- Institute of Biodiversity and Environmental Conservation, Universiti Malaysia Sarawak (UNIMAS)
- Faculty of Forestry, Universiti Putra Malaysia (UPM)
- School of Industrial Technology, Universiti Sains Malaysia (USM)
- Faculty of Applied Sciences, Universiti Teknologi MARA (UiTM)

=== Mongolia ===
- Department of Forestry, Mongolian State University of Agriculture (MSUA)
- Department of Forest Technology, Mongolian University of Science and Technology (MUST)
- Department of Forestry, National University of Mongolia (NUM)

=== Myanmar ===
- University of Forestry (Yezin)

=== Nepal ===
- Faculty of Forestry, Agriculture and Forestry University, Hetauda
- Tribhuvan University
  - Institute of Forestry, Pokhara (Pokhara Campus)
  - Institute of Forestry, Hetauda (Hetauda Campus)
  - Kathmandu Forestry College, Kathmandu
- Purbanchal University College of Environment and Forestry

=== Pakistan ===
- Agricultural Research Institute, Quetta
- Department of Forestry, Shaheed Benazir Bhutto University, Sheringal Dir Upper Khyber Pakhtunkhwa, Pakistan
- Department of Forestry and Range Management, Faculty of Forestry, Range Management and Wildlife, Pir Mehr Ali Shah Arid Agriculture University
- Department of Forestry and Range Management, Bahauddin Zakariya University, Multan
- Department of Forestry and Wildlife Management, University of Haripur, Haripur District
- Department of Forestry, Range Management, and Wildlife, University of Agriculture, Faisalabad
- Pakistan Forest Institute, Peshawar
- Punjab Forest School, Bahawalpur
- School of Agriculture and Forestry, University of Swat
- Sindh Agriculture University, Hyderabad
- University of Agriculture (Peshawar)
- Institute of Agriculture Sciences and Forestry, University of Swat, Swat

=== Philippines ===
- Bilar Campus, Bohol Island State University (BISU)
- Cabagan Campus, Isabela State University (ISU)
- College of Agriculture, Animal Science and Environmental Sciences MSU-Naawan
- College of Agricultural Sciences and Natural Resources, Caraga State University (CarSU)
- College of Agriculture, Food and Sustainable Development (CAFSD), Mariano Marcos State University (MMSU)
- College of Agriculture, Forestry and Fisheries (CAFF), Negros Oriental State University (NoRSU)
- College of Agriculture, Forestry Department (SLSU-Lucban Quezon)
- College of Forestry, Benguet State University (BSU)
- College of Forestry, Nueva Vizcaya State University (NVSU)
- College of Forestry and Environmental Science, Central Mindanao University (CMU)
- College of Forestry and Environmental Studies, Mindanao State University (MSU)
- College of Forestry and Natural Resources, University of the Philippines Los Baños (UPLB)
- College of Forestry and Natural Resources, Visayas State University (VSU)
- College of Forestry and Environmental Studies, Western Mindanao State University (WMSU)
- Department of Forestry University of Southeastern Philippines (USeP-, Tagum-Mabini Campus, Tagum City, Davao del Norte)
- Echague Campus, Isabela State University (ISU)
- Forestry and Environmental Studuies University of Mindanao (UM) Davao City
- Gonzaga Campus, Cagayan State University (CSU)
- Institute of Agriculture and Forestry, Ilocos Sur Polytechnic State College (ISPSC - Sta. Maria Campus) Santa Maria, Ilocos Sur
- Institute of Agriculture and Forestry, Tarlac College of Agriculture (TCA)
- Institute of Agroforestry and Watershed Management, Don Mariano Marcos Memorial State University (DMMMSU)
- Institute of Arts and Sciences, Pampanga Agricultural College (PAC)
- Tanay Campus, University of Rizal System (URS)
- College of Forestry, Central Philippines State University (CPSU)
- College of Agriculture, Forestry and Environmental Sciences (Western Philippine University)

=== South Korea ===
- Department of Forestry, Kyungpook National University
- Division of Environmental and Forest Sciences, Gyeongsang National University
- College of Forest and Environmental Sciences, Kangwon National University
- Department of Forest Environmental Sciences, College of Agriculture and Life Sciences, Seoul National University
- Division of Forest Resources, Chonnam National University
- Department of Forest Resources, Yeungnam University

=== Sri Lanka ===
- Faculty of Agriculture, Rajarata University of Sri Lanka
- Faculty of Agriculture, University of Peradeniya
- Faculty of Agriculture, University of Ruhuna
- Faculty of Applied science,(Department of Forestry & Environmental science)University of Sri Jayewardenepura

=== Taiwan ===
- College of Environmental Studies and Oceanography, National Dong Hwa University
- Department of Forestry and Natural Resources, National Chiayi University
- Department of Forestry and Natural Resources, National Ilan University
- Department of Forestry and Nature Conservation, Chinese Culture University
- Department of Forestry, National Chung Hsing University
- Department of Forestry, National Pingtung University of Science and Technology
- School of Forestry and Resource Conservation, National Taiwan University

=== Thailand ===
- Faculty of Forestry, Kasetsart University
- Agroforestry, Maejo University
- [FORRU-CMU], Chiang Mai University

=== Vietnam ===
- Bắc Giang University of Agriculture and Forestry
- College of Agriculture and Forestry, Huế University, Huế
- Department of Agriculture and Forestry, Tây Nguyên University, Buôn Ma Thuột, Đắk Lắk
- Faculty of Forestry, Ho Chi Minh City University of Agriculture and Forestry (Nong Lam University), Thủ Đức
- Thái Nguyên University of Agriculture and Forestry, Thái Nguyên City
- Vietnam National University of Forestry (Formerly Vietnam Forestry University, and before that Xuân Mai Forestry University), Xuan Mai, Hanoi

== Europe ==
=== Albania ===
- Faculty of Forest Sciences, Agricultural University of Tirana

=== Austria ===
- Department of Forest- and Soil Sciences, University of Natural Resources and Life Sciences, Vienna
- Ossiach forestry training centre, Bundesforschungs- und Ausbildungszentrum für Wald, Naturgefahren und Landschaft

=== Belarus ===
- Faculty of Forestry, Belarusian State Technological University
- Institute of Forest Science, NASB

=== Belgium ===
- Department of Forest and Nature Management, Gembloux Agro-Bio Tech, University of Liège (Gembloux)
- Earth & Life Institute, Departement of Forestry, University of Louvain (Louvain-la-Neuve)
- Department of Forest, Nature and Landscape, Katholieke Universiteit Leuven (Leuven)
- Laboratory of Forestry, Ghent University (Ghent)
- Department of Agronomy, Haute École de la Province de Liège (Theux)

=== Bosnia and Herzegovina ===
- Faculty of Forestry, University of Banja Luka
- Faculty of Forestry, University of Bihać
- Faculty of Forestry, University of Istočno Sarajevo
- Faculty of Forestry, University of Sarajevo

=== Bulgaria ===
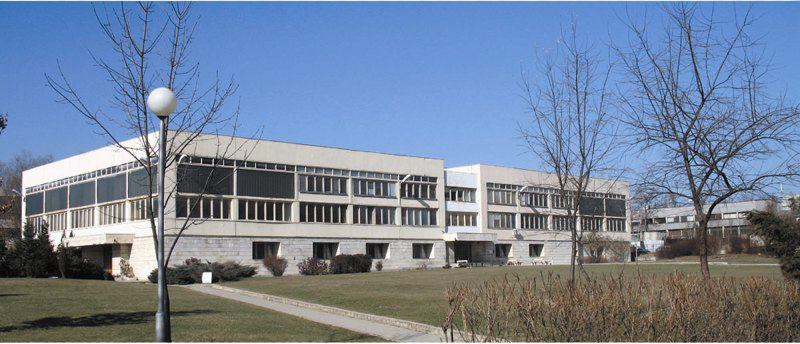
University of Forestry, Sofia

- Faculty of Forestry, University of Forestry, Sofia

=== Croatia ===
- Faculty of Forestry, University of Zagreb

=== Cyprus ===
- Cyprus Forestry College

=== Czech Republic ===
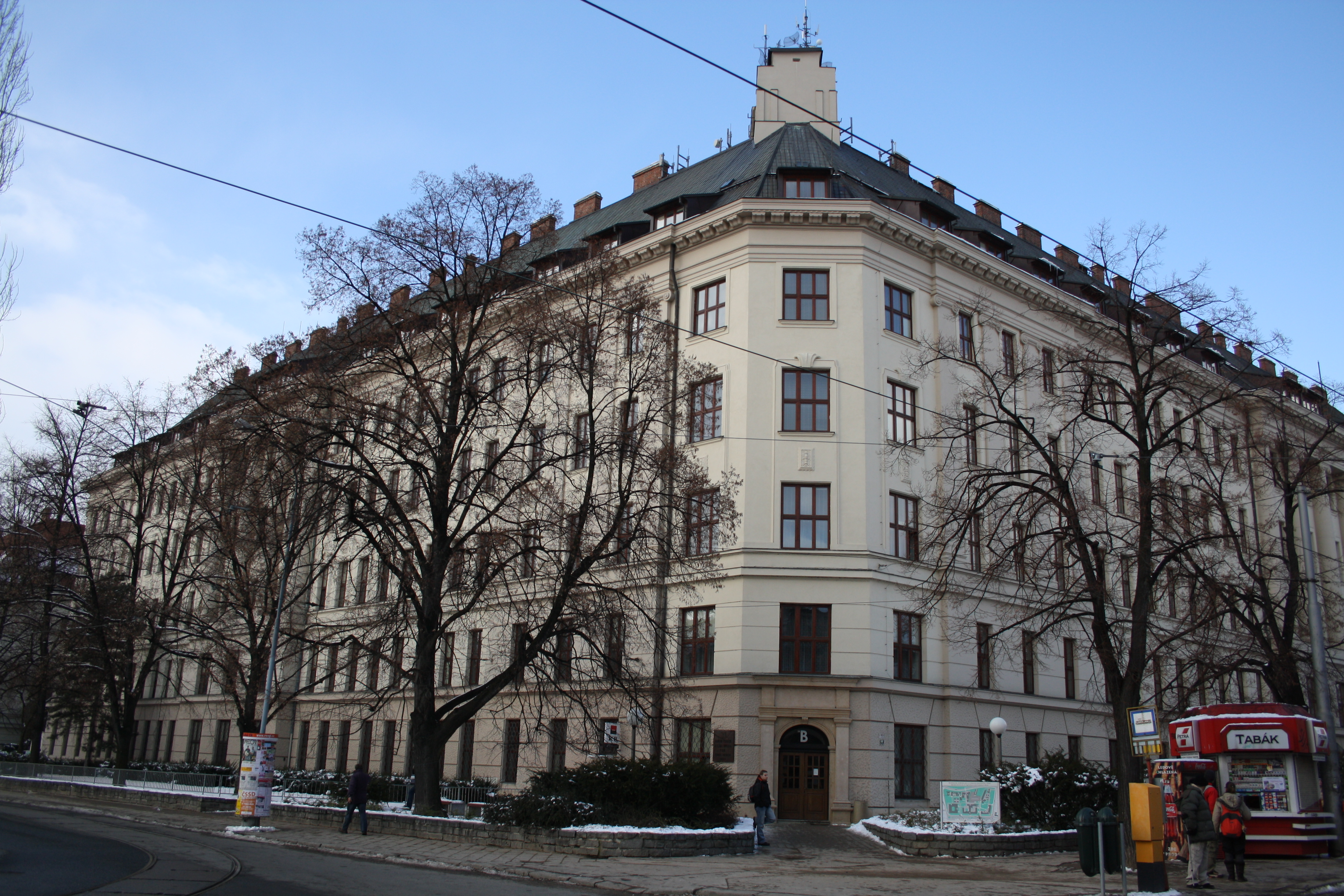
Mendel University in Brno

- Faculty of Forestry and Wood Technology, Mendel University in Brno
- Faculty of Forestry and Wood Sciences, Czech University of Life Sciences Prague

=== Denmark ===
- Danish Forestry College
- Forest and Landscape College, University of Copenhagen

=== Estonia ===
- Institute of Forestry and Rural Engineering, Estonian University of Life Sciences

=== Finland ===
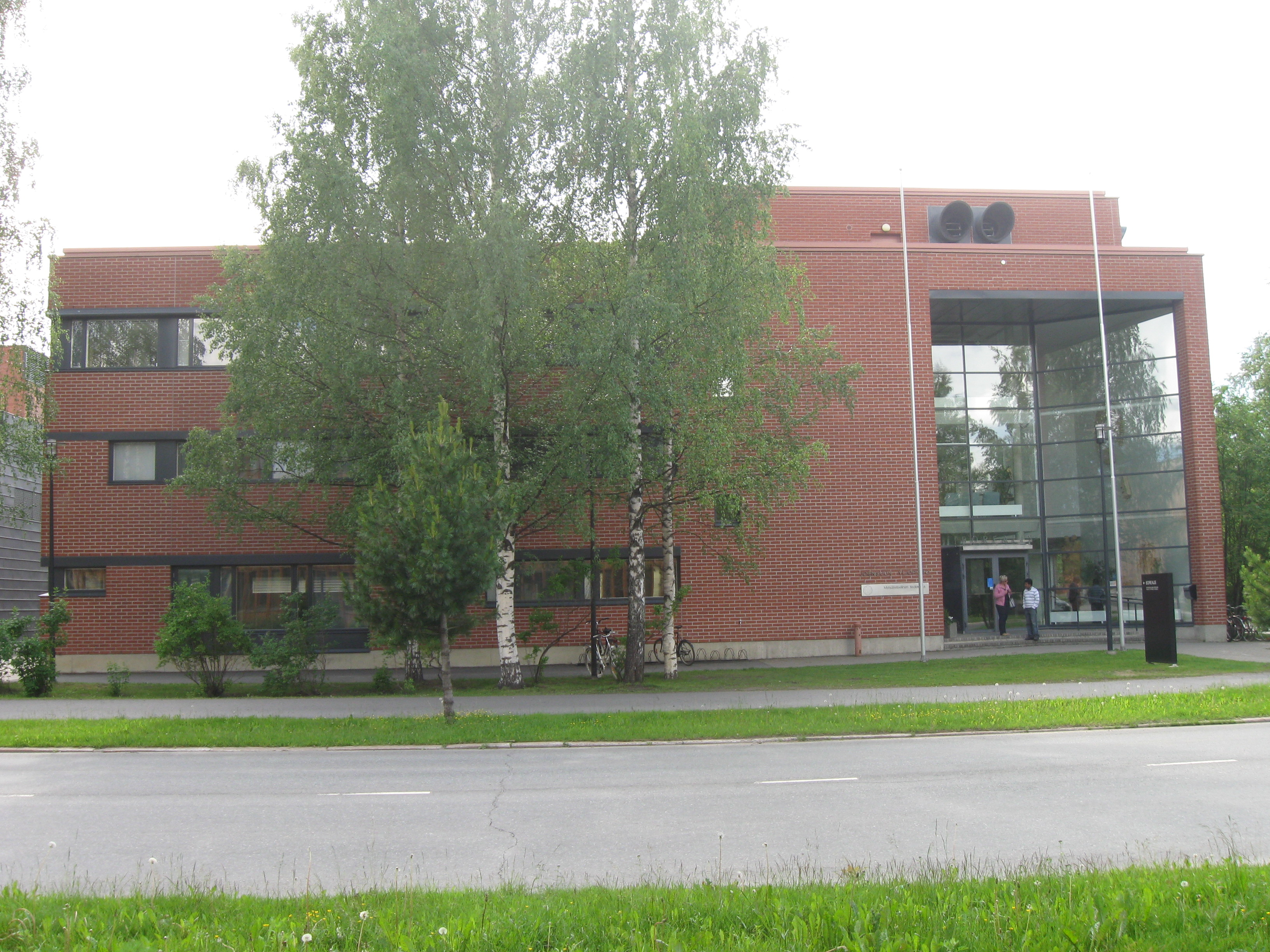
Borealis, the home of forestry at the University of Eastern Finland

- Degree Program in Forestry, Tampere University of Applied Sciences
- Department of Forest Products Technology, Helsinki University of Technology
- Faculty of Agriculture and Forestry, University of Helsinki
- Faculty of Science and Forestry, University of Eastern Finland
- Forest and Wood Technology, Karelia University of Applied Sciences
- Forestry and Wood Technology, Pohjois-Savo Polytechnic
- Forestry Study Programme, Häme Polytechnic
- Lab of Pulping Technology, Åbo Akademi University
- Pieksämäki School of Forestry, Mikkeli University of Applied Sciences
- Swedish Vocational Institute, Vasa
- Unit of Natural Resources, Sodankylä Vocational Institute (SKAI)

=== France ===
- Dynamiques Forestières dans l'Espace Rural (Dynafor), National University of Agronomy Toulouse (ENSAT)
- Meymac Forestry College
- École supérieure du bois (ESB), Nantes
- Gestion Intégrée des Agrosystèmes et des Forêts, École nationale supérieure des sciences agronomiques de Bordeaux Aquitaine (Bordeaux Sciences Agro), University of Bordeaux
- École nationale supérieure des technologies et industries du bois (ENSTIB), Université Henri Poincaré
- Javols Forestry College
- Crogny Forestry College
- National College of Agricultural Engineering, Water and Forestry (ENGREF), Agro ParisTech, Paris Institute of Technology for Life, Food and Environmental Sciences
- ECAM Lyon, Formation ingénieur bois

=== Germany ===
- Department of Forest Sciences, Dresden University of Technology
- Eberswalde University for Sustainable Development (FH)
  - Faculty of Forest and Environment
  - Faculty of Wood Technology and Wood Processing
- Faculty of Wood Technology and Wood Processing, Rosenheim University of Applied Sciences
- Faculty of Forestry, Rottenburg University of Applied Forest Sciences
- Faculty of Forestry, School of Life Sciences, Technical University of Munich
- Faculty of Resource Management, HAWK - University of Applied Sciences and Arts - Hildesheim/Holzminden/Goettingen
- Faculty of Forestry, University of Applied Sciences Erfurt
- Faculty of Forest and Environmental Sciences, University of Freiburg
- Faculty of Forest Sciences and Forest Ecology, University of Göttingen
- Department of Wood and Forestry, University of Hamburg
- Faculty of Forest Science, LMU Munich

=== Greece ===
- Department of Forest and Natural Environment Sciences, School of Geosciences, International Hellenic University
- Department of Forestry and Natural Environmental Management at Karpenisi, Agricultural University of Athens
- Department of Forestry, Management of the Environment and Natural Resources at Orestiada, Democritus University of Thrace
- Faculty of Forestry and Natural Environment, Aristotle University of Thessaloniki
- Technological Educational Institute of Larissa
  - Department of Forestry and Natural Environmental Management at Karditsa
  - Department of Wood & Furniture Design and Technology at Karditsa

=== Hungary ===
- Faculty of Forestry, University of Sopron, Sopron

=== Italy ===
- Department for Innovation in Biological, Agro-food and Forest systems, University of Tuscia
- Dipartimento di Scienze Agrarie, Forestali e Alimentari, University of Torino
- Faculty of Agriculture, University of Ancona
- Faculty of Agriculture, University of Basilicata
- Faculty of Agriculture, University of Florence
- Faculty of Agriculture, University of Molise
- Faculty of Agriculture, University of Padua
- Faculty of Agriculture, University of Palermo
- Faculty of Agriculture, University of Reggio Calabria
- Faculty of Agriculture, University of Sassari
- Faculty of Agriculture and Forestry industry University of Milan

=== Latvia ===
- Forest Faculty, Latvia University of Life Sciences and Technologies

=== Lithuania ===
- Faculty of Forestry, Lithuanian University of Agriculture
- Faculty of Forestry and Landscape Planning, Kaunas College of Forestry and Environmental Engineering

=== The Netherlands ===
- Forest Ecology and Forest Management Group, Department of Environmental Sciences, Wageningen University
- Tropical Forestry, Department of Environmental Science, Van Hall Larenstein University, Velp

=== North Macedonia ===
- Faculty of Forestry, Ss. Cyril and Methodius University of Skopje

=== Norway ===
- Faculty of Applied Ecology and Agricultural Sciences, Inland Norway University of Applied Sciences
- Faculty of Society and Nature, Nord-Trøndelag University College
- Norwegian University College for Agriculture and Rural Development
- Department of Ecology and Natural Resources, Norwegian University of Life Sciences
- Pulp and Paper Technology Group, Norwegian University of Science and Technology

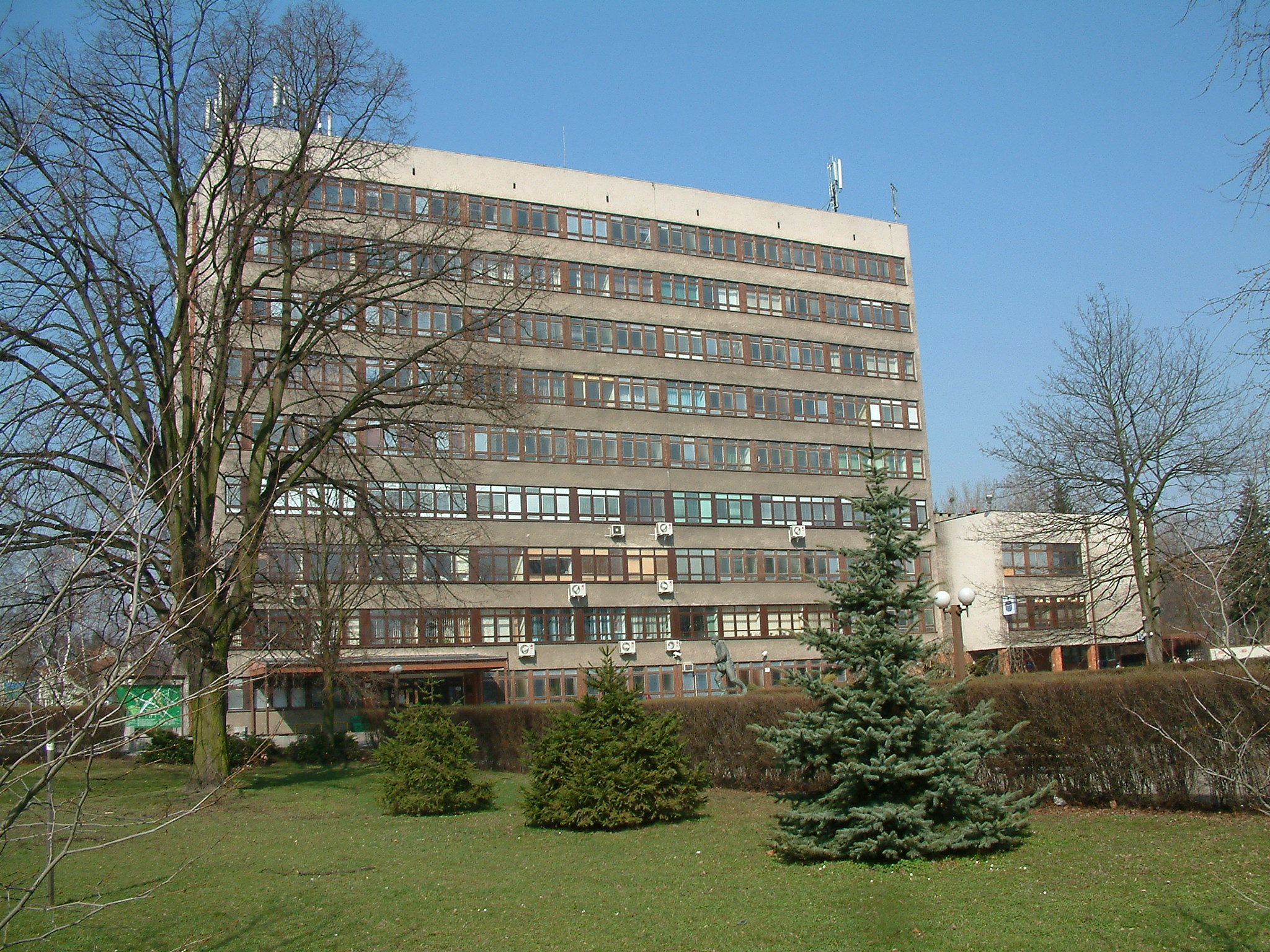
University of Life Sciences, Poznań

=== Poland ===
- Faculty of Forestry, Agricultural University of Cracow, Kraków
- Faculty of Forestry Bialystok Technical University
- University of Life Sciences in Poznań
  - Faculty of Forestry and Wood Technology
- Faculty of Forestry, University of Warmia and Mazury in Olsztyn, Olsztyn
- Warsaw University of Life Science
  - Faculty of Forestry
  - Faculty of Wood Technology

=== Portugal ===
- Department of Forestry, Agrarian School of the Polythecnic Institute of Coimbra
- Department of Forestry, University of Évora
- Forestry Department, Higher Institute of Agronomy of the University of Lisbon
- Forestry Department, University of Trás-os-Montes and Alto Douro
- Wood Engineering Department, School of Technology and Management of the Polytechnic Institute of Viseu

=== Romania ===
- Colegiul Silvic Theodor Pietraru, highschool in Branesti, județul Ilfov
- Department of Forestry and Agritourism, Faculty of Natural Sciences, Engineering and Information Science, Vasile Goldiş Western University, Arad
- Department of Silviculture, Faculty of Horticulture, University of Agricultural Sciences and Veterinary Medicine, Cluj-Napoca
- Faculty of Silviculture, Ştefan cel Mare University, Suceava
- Transylvania University, Brașov
  - Faculty of Silviculture and Forest Operations
  - Faculty of Wood Industry
- Department of Silviculture, Faculty of Agriculture, University of Agronomic Sciences and Veterinary Medicine of Bucharest USAMV Bucharest http://www.agro-bucuresti.ro/english/

=== Russia ===
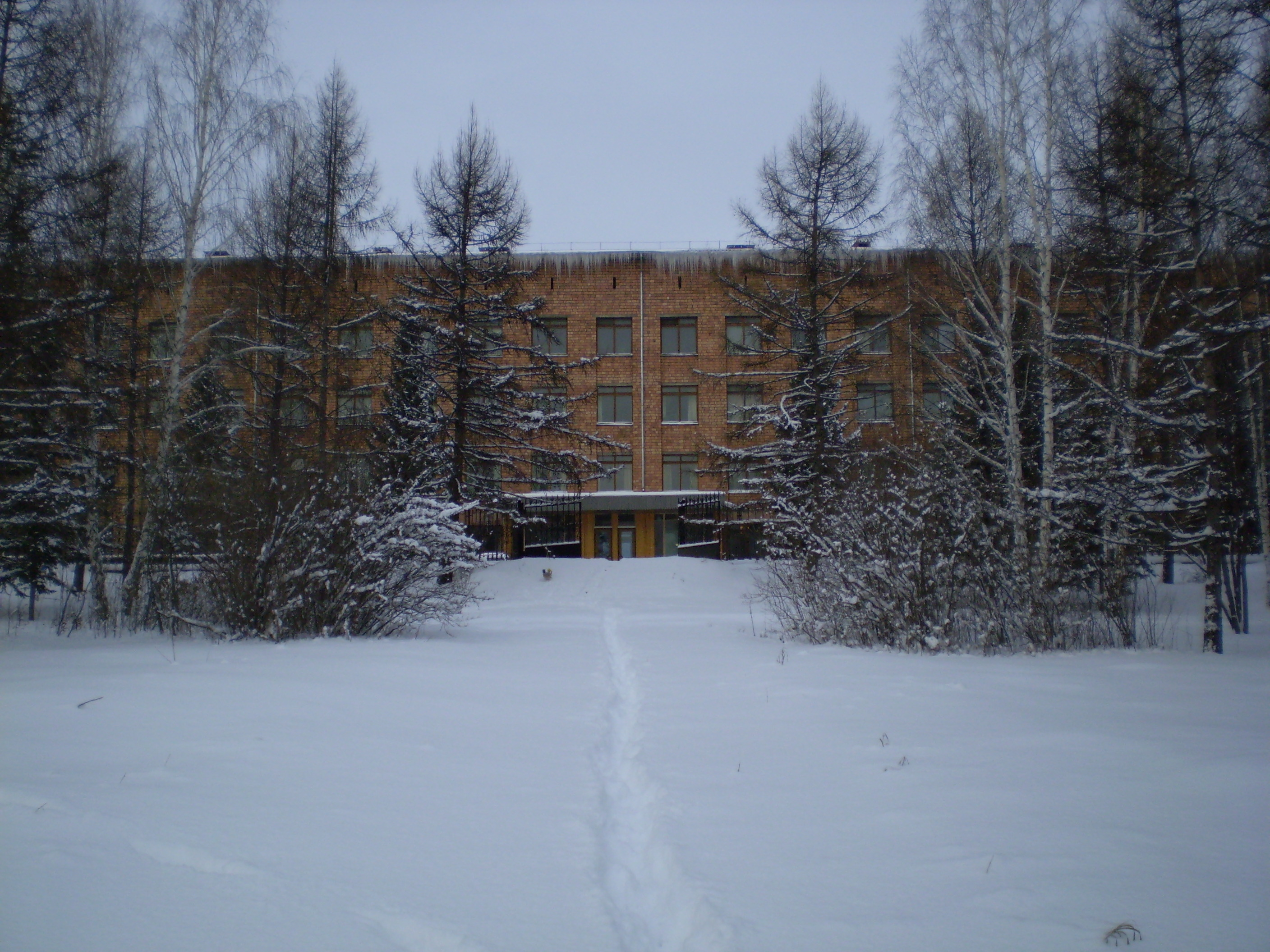
Sukachev Institute of Forest, Moscow

- Faculty of Forestry, Arkhangelsk State Technical University
- Forest Faculty, Moscow State Forest University
- Research Institute of Forest Genetics and Plant Breeding, Voronezh
- Saint Petersburg State Forest Technical University
- Saint Petersburg State Technological University of Plant Polymers
- Siberian State Aerospace University
- Siberian State Technological University
- Sukachev Institute of Forest, Russian Academy of Sciences, Moscow
- Ural State Forest Engineering University
- Voronezh State Academy of Forestry Engineering
- Volga State University of Technology
- Forest Research Institute of the Karelian Research Centre of the Russian Academy of Sciences
- Federal State Budgetary Educational Institution of Higher Education “Izhevsk State Agricultural Academy” (FSBEI HE Izhevsk SAA)
- Institute of Forest Science, RAS

=== Serbia ===
- Faculty of Forestry, University of Belgrade

=== Slovakia ===
- Faculty of Forestry, Technical University in Zvolen

=== Slovenia ===
- Biotechnical Faculty, University of Ljubljana

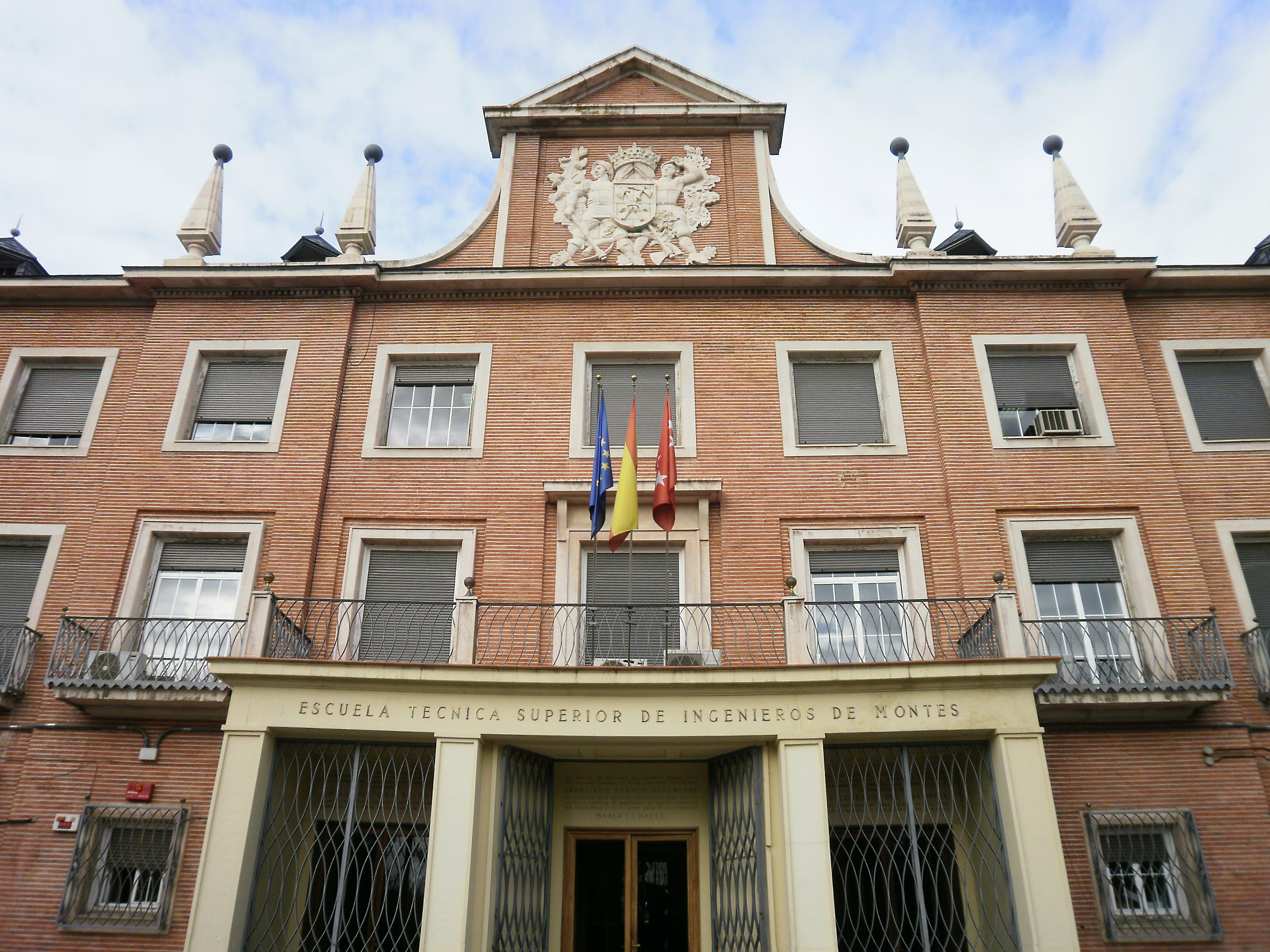
School of Forest Engineering and Natural Resources

=== Spain ===
- Polytechnic University of Valencia
- School of Forest Engineering and Natural Resource wichs belongs to the Polytechnic University of Madrid
- Universidad Católica de Ávila
- School of Agricultural and Forest Engineering (ETSIAM) wichs belongs to the University of Córdoba
- Forestry and Environmental Engineering, Universidad de Extremadura (Plasencia)
- Universidad de Huelva, Huelva
- Universidad de León (Ponferrada)
- School of Agrifood and Forestry Science and Engineering (ETSEA), University of Lleida
- Universidad de Oviedo, Escuela politécnica de Mieres, Sistemas Forestales Atlánticos (GIS-Forest)
- Universidad de Santiago de Compostela (Lugo)
- Universidad de Valladolid (Palencia)
- Universidad de Vigo - Forestry Faculty of Pontevedra

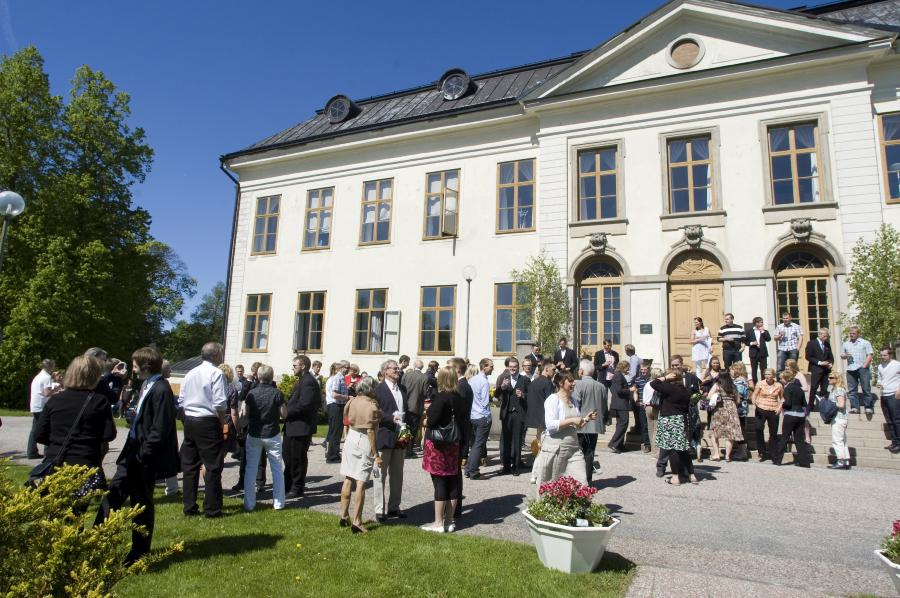
School for Forest Management, Swedish University of Agricultural Sciences, Skinnskatteberg

=== Sweden ===
- Division of Wood Technology and Processing, KTH Royal Institute of Technology, Stockholm
- Faculty of Forestry, Swedish University of Agricultural Sciences, Umeå and Skinnskatteberg
- Luleå University of Technology, Skellefteå

=== Switzerland ===
- Department of Environmental Sciences, Swiss Federal Institute of Technology Zürich
- School of Agricultural, Forest and Food Sciences HAFL

=== Turkey ===
- Faculty of Forestry, Artvin Çoruh University
- Faculty of Forestry, Bartın University
- Faculty of Forestry, Bursa Technical University
- Faculty of Forestry, Çankırı Karatekin University
- Faculty of Forestry, Duzce University
- Faculty of Forestry, Istanbul University-Cerrahpasa
- Faculty of Forestry, Izmir Katip Celebi University
- Faculty of Forestry, Kahramanmaraş Sütçü İmam University
- Faculty of Forestry, Karabuk University
- Faculty of Forestry, Karadeniz Technical University
- Faculty of Forestry, Kastamonu University
- Faculty of Forestry, Isparta University of Applied Sciences

=== Ukraine ===
- Faculty of Forestry, National Agriculture University of Ukraine
- National Forestry University of Ukraine

=== United Kingdom ===
- Agricultural Extension and Rural Development Department, University of Reading
- Centre for Rural Development and Training, University of Wolverhampton
- Crop and Environment Sciences, Harper Adams University
- Department of Forestry, University of Aberdeen
- National School of Forestry, University of Cumbria
- Oxford Forestry Institute, Oxford University
- School of Forestry, University of Edinburgh
- School of the Environment, Natural Resources and Geography (SENRG) Bangor University
- Scottish School of Forestry, University of the Highlands and Islands

== North America ==
=== Canada ===
- Faculty of Natural Resources Management, Lakehead University
- Faculty of Forestry, Université de Moncton, New Brunswick
- Faculty of Forestry, Geography and Geomatics, Université Laval, Quebec City
- Faculty of Agricultural, Life and Environmental Sciences, University of Alberta
- Faculty of Forestry, University of British Columbia
- Faculty of Forestry and Environmental Management, University of New Brunswick
- University of Northern British Columbia
  - Faculty of Natural Resources Management
  - Faculty of Forestry
- Faculty of Forestry, University of Toronto

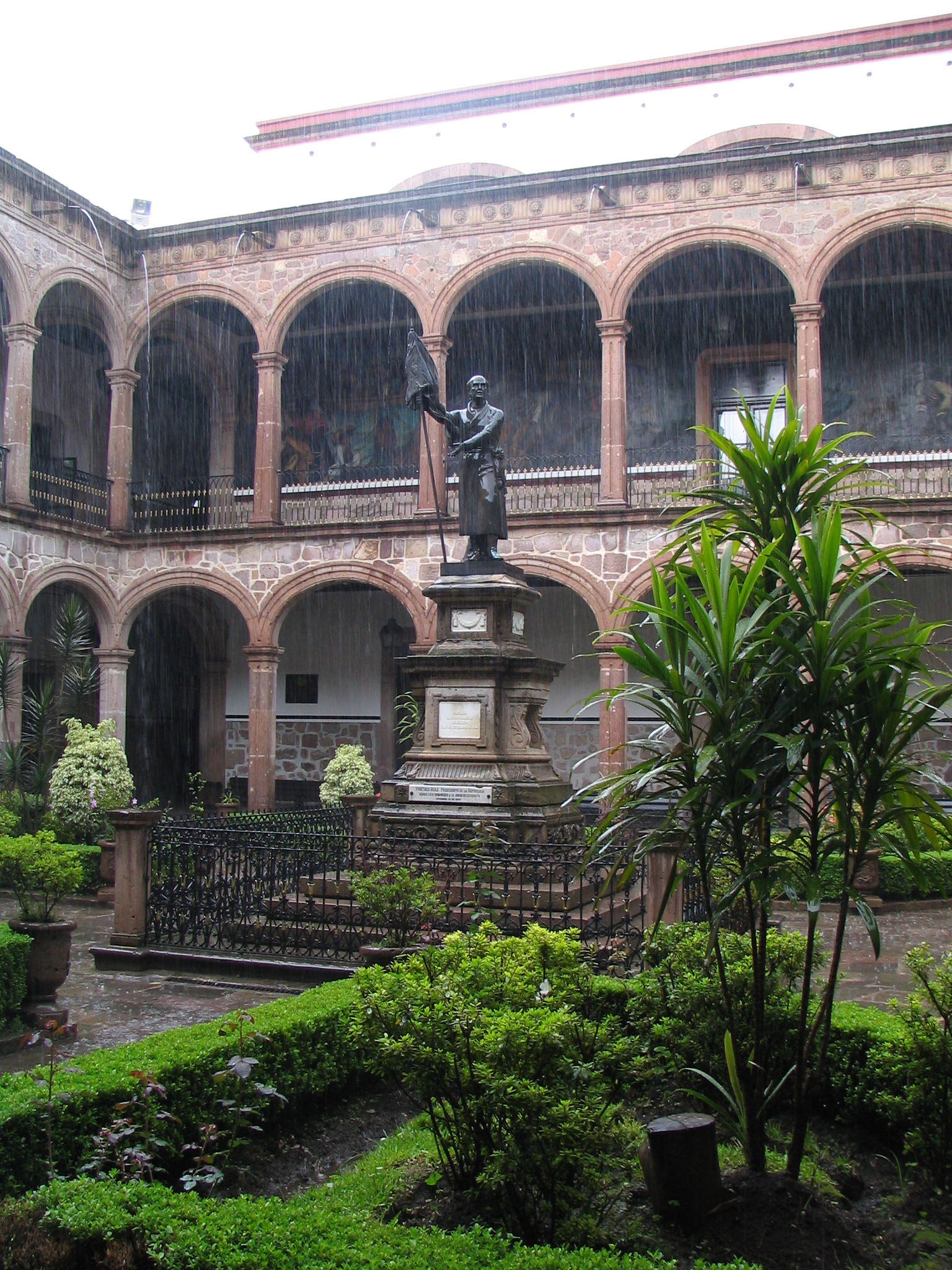
Universidad Michoacana de San Nicolás de Hidalgo

=== Mexico ===
- Department of Forestry, Universidad Autónoma Agraria Antonio Narro
- Division of Forest Sciences, Universidad Autónoma Chapingo
- Facultad de Agrobiología "Presidente Juarez"- Universidad Michoacana de San Nicolas de Hidalgo
- Faculty of Agricultural and Forest Sciences, Universidad Autónoma de Chihuahua
- Faculty of Forest Sciences, Universidad Autónoma de Nuevo León
- Faculty of Forest Sciences, Universidad Juárez del Estado de Durango
- Faculty of Wood Engineering and Technology, Universidad Michoacana de San Nicolás de Hidalgo
- Forestry Program, Colegio de Postgraduados
- Institute of Agricultural Sciences, Universidad Autónoma del Estado de Hidalgo
- Universidad del Mar
- University Center of Biological and Agricultural Sciences, Universidad de Guadalajara
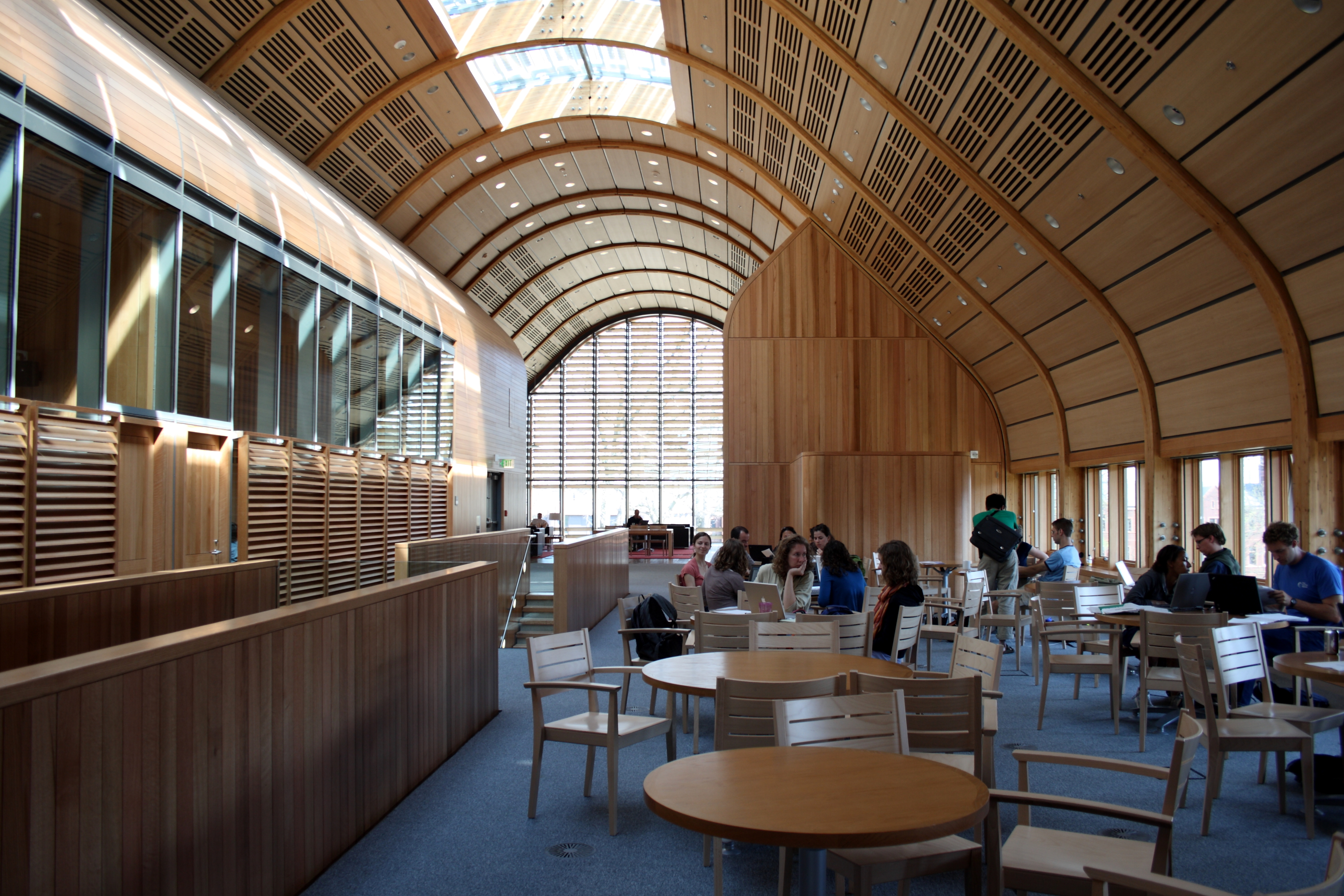
  A wooden green building at Yale

=== United States ===
==== Northeast ====
- College of Natural Sciences, Forestry and Agriculture, University of Maine
- Department of Forest and Natural Resources Management, SUNY Environmental Science and Forestry
- Department of Natural Resources and the Environment, University of New Hampshire
- Department of Natural Resources Conservation, University of Massachusetts Amherst
- Department of Plant Science and Landscape Architecture, University of Maryland
- Division of Forestry, West Virginia University
- Parks and Forest Resources, Unity College (Maine)
- Rubenstein School of Environment and Natural Resources, The University of Vermont
- School of the Environment, Yale University
- School of Forest Resources, Pennsylvania State University
- School of Natural Resource Management and Ecology, Paul Smith's College

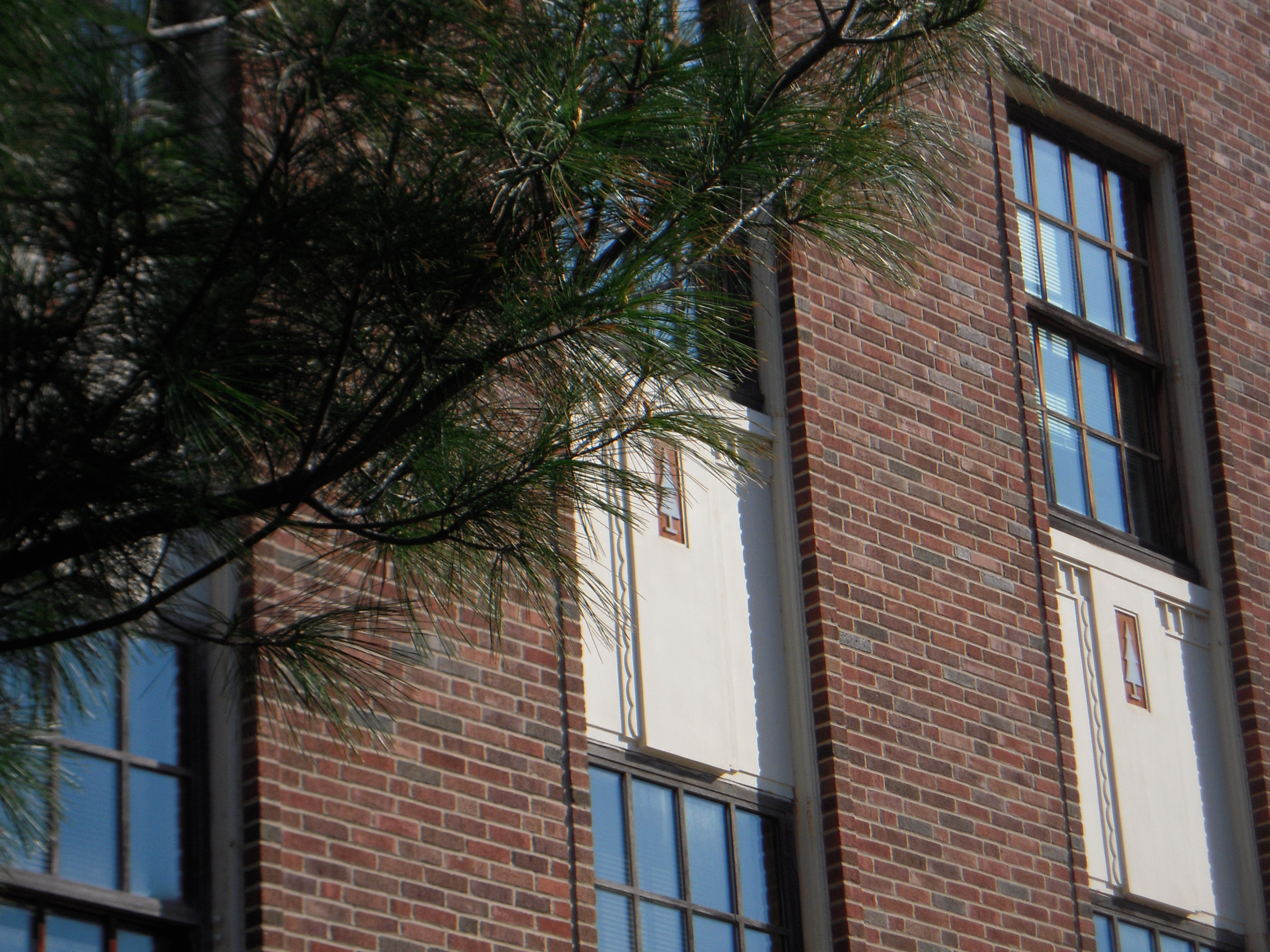
Tree details on Green Hall, the home of the forestry department at the University of Minnesota

==== Midwest ====
- College of Natural Resources, University of Wisconsin–Stevens Point
- Department of Forest and Wildlife Ecology, University of Wisconsin–Madison
- Department of Forest Resources, University of Minnesota
- Department of Forestry, Michigan State University
- Department of Forestry, Southern Illinois University
- Department of Forestry and Natural Resources, Purdue University
- Department of Natural Resource Ecology and Management, Iowa State University
- Department of Natural Resources and Environmental Sciences, University of Illinois at Urbana-Champaign
- School of Forest Resources & Environmental Science, Michigan Technological University
- School of Natural Resources, Ohio State University
- The School of Natural Resources, University of Missouri
- School of Natural Resources & Environment, University of Michigan

==== South ====
- Arthur Temple College of Forestry and Agriculture, Stephen F. Austin State University
- Center for Forestry and Ecology, Alabama A&M University
- College of Forest Resources, Mississippi State University
- College of Natural Resources, North Carolina State University
- Department of Ecosystem Science and Management, Texas A&M University
- Department of Forest Resources, Abraham Baldwin Agricultural College
- Department of Forest Resources, Clemson University
- Department of Forest Resources and Environmental Conservation, Virginia Polytechnic Institute and State University
- Department of Forestry, University of Kentucky
- Department of Forestry, Wildlife and Fisheries, University of Tennessee
- Department of Natural Resource Ecology and Management, Oklahoma State University
- Nicholas School of the Environment, Duke University
- School of Forest, Fisheries, and Geomatics Sciences, University of Florida
- School of Forestry, Louisiana Tech University
- School of Forestry & Natural Resources, University of Arkansas at Monticello
- School of Forestry and Wildlife Sciences, Auburn University
- School of Renewable Natural Resources, Louisiana State University
- Warnell School of Forestry and Natural Resources, University of Georgia

==== West ====
- College of Agriculture and Environmental Sciences, University of California, Davis
- College of Forestry, Oregon State University
- College of Forestry and Conservation, University of Montana
- College of Natural Resources, University of California, Berkeley
- College of Natural Resources, Department of Forest, Rangeland, and Fire Sciences, University of Idaho
- College of Natural Resources, Department of Forest, and Rangeland Stewardship, Colorado State University
- Department of Forest Sciences, University of Alaska Fairbanks
- Department of Forestry and Wildland Resources, California State Polytechnic University, Humboldt
- Department of Natural Resources Management, California Polytechnic State University
- Department of Wildland Resources, Utah State University
- School of Environment and Forest Sciences, University of Washington
- School of Forestry, Northern Arizona University
- School of the Environment, Washington State University
- Department of Forestry, New Mexico Highlands University

== Oceania ==
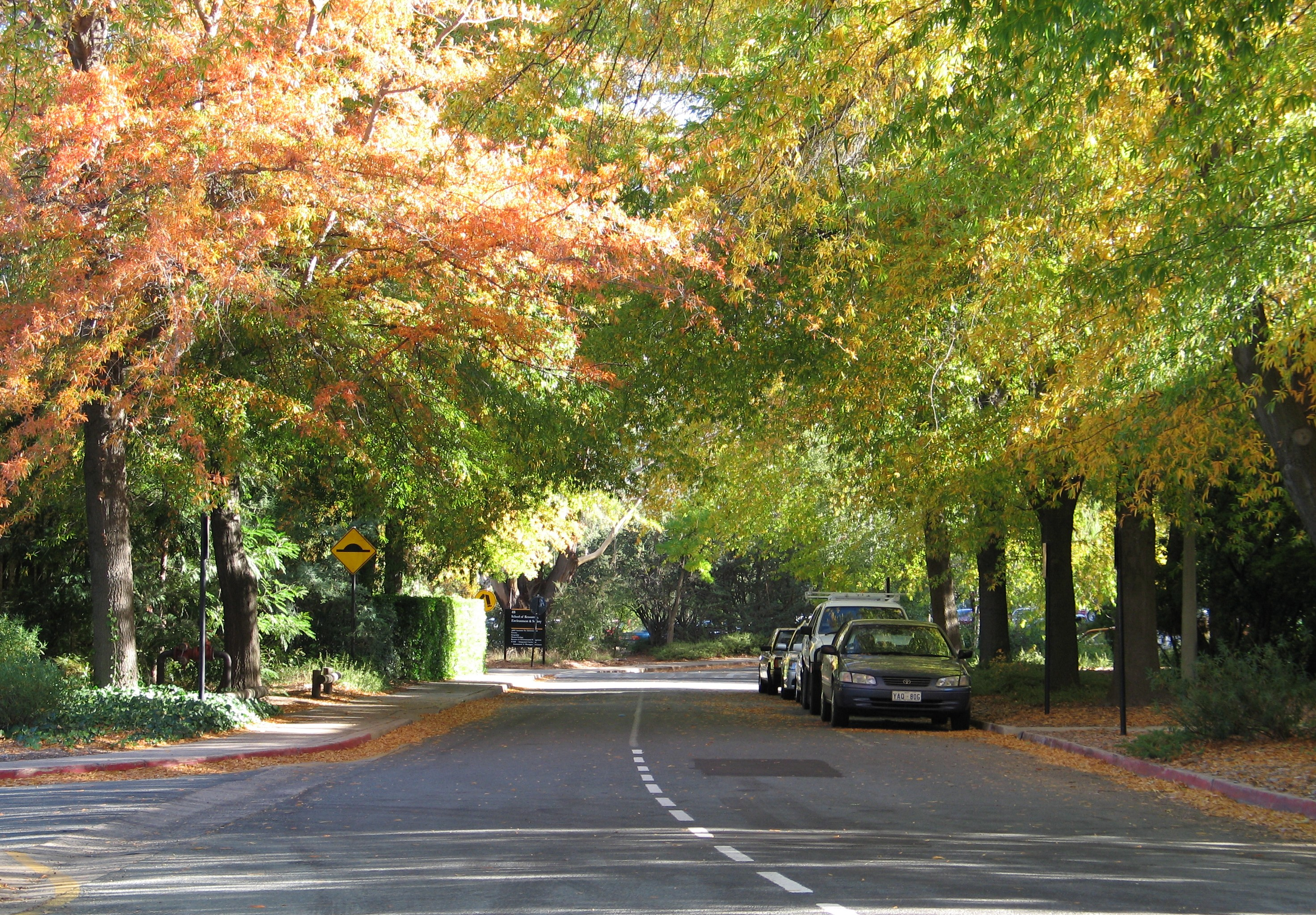
Linnaeus Way at Australian National University, Canberra

=== Australia ===
- College of Medicine, Biology and Environment, Australian National University
- Department of Forest and Ecosystem Science, University of Melbourne
- School of Environmental Science and Management, Southern Cross University (Lismore)

=== New Zealand ===
- School of Forestry, University of Canterbury (Christchurch)
- Timber Technology Campus, Waiariki Institute of Technology

=== Papua New Guinea ===
- Bulolo Forestry College
- Forestry Department, Papua New Guinea University of Technology

== South America and Caribbean ==
=== Argentina ===
- Department of Agronomy, National University of the South
- Faculty of Agroindustries, National University of the Chaco Austral
- Faculty of Forest Engineering, National University of the Patagonia San Juan Bosco
- Faculty of Forest Sciences, National University of Misiones
- Institute of Forestry, National University of Cuyo
- National Agricultural Technology Institute (INTA)
- Faculty of Agricultural and Forestry Science, National University of La Plata

=== Bolivia ===
- Faculty of Agronomy, Universidad Mayor de San Andrés (UMSA)
- Profession of Forest Engineering, Universidad Autónoma Gabriel René Moreno
- Profession of Forest Engineering, Universidad Autónoma Juan Misael Saracho
- Profession of Forest Engineering, Universidad Técnica del Beni Mariscal José Ballivian
- Technical School of Forestry, Universidad Mayor de San Simón

=== Brazil ===
- Department of Forest Sciences, Federal University of Paraná (UFPR), Curitiba, PR
- Department of Forest Sciences, Federal University of Santa Maria (UFSM), Santa Maria, RS
- Department of Forestry and Wood Sciences, Universidade Federal do Espírito Santo (UFES), Alegre, ES
- Department of Forestry Engineering, Federal University of The Valleys of Jequitinhonha and Mucuri - UFVJM
- Department of Forestry Engineering, University of Brasília (UnB), Brasília, DF
- Department of Forestry Sciences, Federal University of Viçosa (UFV), Viçosa, MG
- Department of Forestry Sciences, Federal University of Amazonas, AM
- Faculty of agricultural sciences (FCA) - Department of Forestry Sciences (DCF), Universidade Estadual Paulista (UNESP), Botucatu, SP
- Forestry Engineering Course, Campus Universitário Curitibanos, Federal University of Santa Catarina, UFSC, Curitibanos, SC
- Forestry Engineering Course, Federal University of São Carlos (UFSCar), Sorocaba, SP
- Forestry Engineering Course, Federal University of Technology - Paraná (UTFPR), Dois Vizinhos, PR
- Forestry Engineering Course, Federal University of Lavras, MG
- Forestry Engineering Course, Forestry Department, State University of Midwestern Paraná - Paraná (UNICENTRO), Irati, PR
- Institute of Biodiversity and Forests, Federal University of Western Pará (UFOPA), Santarém, PA
- Forestry Engineering Course, Universidade do Estado do Pará (UEPA)
- Forestry Engineering Course, Universidade Federal de Sergipe (UFS)
- Forestry Engineering Course, University of São Paulo, SP
  - Superior School of Agriculture Luiz de Queiroz, University of São Paulo, Piracicaba
- Forestry Institute, Univesidade Federal Rural do Rio de Janeiro (UFRRJ), RJ
- Institute of Agrarian Sciences, Federal University of Minas Gerais, MG
- School of Agricultural Sciences, São Paulo State University, Botucatu, SP
- Forestry Engineering Course, Federal Rural University of Amazon (UFRA), Belém, Paragominas, PA.
- Forest Engineering Program, Santa Catarina State University (UDESC), Lages, Santa Catarina, SC.
- Forest Engineering Course, Universidade Federal do Tocantins (UFT), Gurupi, TO

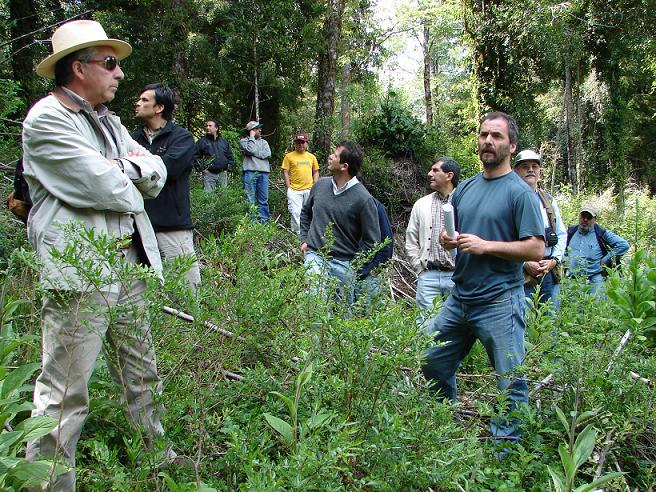
Teachers and students of UACh in the Valdivian temperate rain forests of San Pablo de Tregua, Chile

=== Chile ===
- Faculty of Forest Sciences, Catholic University of the Maule
- Faculty of Forestry Sciences and Natural Resources, Universidad Austral de Chile (UACh)
- Department of Wood Sciences, University of the Bío Bío
- Faculty of Forest Sciences, University of Chile
- Faculty of Forestry Sciences, University of Concepción (UdeC)
- Faculty of Agricultural and Forest Sciences, University of La Frontera
- Faculty of Forest Sciences, University of Talca

=== Colombia ===
- National University of Colombia (Medellín)
- Universidad del Tolima (Ibagué)
- Universidad Distrital Francisco José de Caldas (Ingeniería Forestal, Bogotá)

=== Costa Rica ===
- Costa Rica Institute of Technology (TEC)
- Regional Program of Silvicultural Management for Mesoamerica and the Caribbean, University of Costa Rica (UCR)
- Environmental Science School, National University of Costa Rica (UNA)
- School of Agronomy, National Learning Institute (INA)

=== Ecuador ===
- Faculty of Agronomic Sciences, Universidad Nacional de Loja
- School of Agroforestry, Escuela Superior Politécnica de Chimborazo
- School of Agronomic and Environmental Sciences, Pontificia Universidad Católica del Ecuador
- School of Forestry Engineering, Universidad Técnica Estatal de Quevedo

=== Guatemala ===
- Centro Universitario del Petén (CUDEP)
- Escuela Nacional Central de Agricultura (ENCAA)
- Facultad de Agronomía, Universidad de San Carlos (FAUSAC)

=== Honduras ===
- Universidad Nacional de Ciencias Forestales (UNACIFOR)
- Department of Biology, National Autonomous University of Honduras
- Universidad José Cecilio del Valle

=== Nicaragua ===
- Universidad de las Regiones Autónomas de la Costa Caribe Nicaragüense (URACCAN)
- Universidad Nacional Agraria (UNAA)

=== Panama ===
- Faculty of Agricultural Sciences, University of Panama

=== Paraguay ===
- Facultad de Ciencias Agrarias, National University

=== Peru ===
- Facultad de Ciencias Forestales, La Molina National Agrarian University
- Facultad de Ciencias Forestales y Medio Ambientales, Universidad de la Amazonia Peruana, Iquitos
- Facultad de Ciencias Forestales y Medio Ambientales, Universidad del Centro del Perú, Huancayo
- Facultad de Ciencias Forestales y Medio Ambientales, Universidad Nacional de Cajamarca
- Facultad de Ciencias Forestales y Medio Ambientales, Universidad Nacional de Madre de Dios, Puerto Maldonado
- Facultad de Ingeniería Forestal, Universidad Nacional de la Amazonia, Pucallpa
- Facultad de Recursos Naturales, Universidad Nacional Agraria de la Selva, Tingo María

=== Trinidad and Tobago ===
- Eastern Caribbean Institute of Agriculture and Forestry (ECIAF), University of Trinidad and Tobago

=== Uruguay ===
- Departamento de Producción Forestal y Tecnología de la Madera, Universidad de la República
- Facultad de Ciencias Agrarias, Universidad de la Empresa
- Universidad del Trabajo del Uruguay

== See also ==
- Forest management
- Institute of technology
- List of agricultural universities and colleges
- List of colleges of natural resources
- List of forest research institutes
- List of historic schools of forestry
- List of tagged degrees
- World Forestry Congress
