= University of New Technologies and Sciences =

Public university in Abomey, Benin

University of New Technologies and Sciences (UNTS)
- Université des nouvelles technologies et des sciences (UNTS)
- Motto: Scientia et tecnologia in hominis servitio
- Type: Public university
- Established: 2016
- Vice-Chancellor: Pr Comlan Aristide Houngan
- Rector: Pr. Joachim Djimon Gbenou
- Location: Abomey, Benin; 7.1640787°N 2.0108493°E
- Language: French
- Website: unstim.bj

The University of New Technologies and Sciences (UNTS) is a public university in Benin, established in 2016 and placed under the authority of the Ministry of Higher Education. It is a public institution of higher education with legal personality and administrative and financial autonomy.

== History ==
In 2016, the Government of Benin decided to create four national universities to relieve the existing ones and launch professional fields, in accordance with decree no. 2016-638 of October 13, 2016, establishing four national universities in the Republic of Benin. This is how UNTS joined the University of Abomey-Calavi and the University of Parakou, which were the two main public universities in Benin at the time. The list also includes the National University of Agriculture (UNA).

== Education ==
The UNTS is a public institution of higher education in Benin that offers programs in Sciences, Technologies, Engineering, and Applied Mathematics. In accordance with the regulations in force, UNTS awards higher education degrees and diplomas, including the Preparatory University Diploma for Engineering Studies, the Professional Bachelor's degree, the Engineering Diploma, the Master's in Applied Sciences, the Master's in Engineering, the Doctorate in Applied Sciences, and the Ph.D.

== University Centers ==
The University of New Technologies and Sciences has four university centers located in the communes of Abomey, Natitingou, Dassa-Zoumè, and Lokossa. These centers are specialized in different fields of study.

=== Abomey University Center ===
- National Higher Institute for Preparatory Classes for Engineering Studies (INSPEI)
- National Higher School of Public Works, specializing in public works
- National Higher School of Mathematical Engineering and Modeling (ENSGMM)
- National Higher School of Energy and Process Engineering (ENSGEP)

=== Natitingou University Center ===
- École Normale Supérieure (ENS)
- Faculty of Science and Technology (FAST)

=== Lokossa University Center ===
- National Higher Institute of Industrial Technologies (INSTI)
- Higher Normal School for Technical Education (ENSET)

=== Dassa-Zoumè University Center ===
- National Higher School of Biosciences and Applied Biotechnologies (ENSBBA)

== Admission ==
UNTS is open to all individuals regardless of nationality, race, gender, religion, or social origin, provided they meet the required qualifications, such as a secondary education baccalaureate or an equivalent recognized qualification.

== Organization ==
The University of New Technologies and Sciences is led by a rector, a vice-rector, and a secretary general. Professor Joachim Djimon Gbenou is the current rector of UNTS.
