= Alexander Bushuyev =

Russian serial killer

- Born: Alexander Veniaminovich Bushuyev; 1949 (age 76–77); Vilegodsky District, Arkhangelsk Oblast, RSFSR
- Other names: "The Gardener Maniac" "The Arkhangelsk Maniac" "The Arkhangelsk Chikatilo"
- Convictions: Murder x7 Sexual assault Robbery x2
- Penalty: 25 years imprisonment (2010); 19 years imprisonment (2017)

Details
- Victims: 7
- Span of crimes: 1997–2002
- Country: Russia
- State: Arkhangelsk
- Date apprehended: For the final time on 9 June 2009
- Imprisoned at: IK-12 Penal Colony, Kholmogorsky District, Arkhangelsk Oblast

Alexander Veniaminovich Bushuyev (Russian: Александр Вениаминович Бушуев; born 1949), known as The Gardener Maniac (Russian: Маньяк-садовод), is a Russian serial killer who raped and murdered seven underage boys and teenagers in Arkhangelsk from 1997 to 2002. His case garnered great publicity, as he was previously regarded as a beloved local gardener who participated in many landscaping and beautification projects across Arkhangelsk. In the end, he was convicted of all charges and sentenced to 25 years imprisonment.

== Early life ==
Alexander Bushuyev was born in 1949 in the Vilegodsky District, Arkhangelsk Oblast, the older of two children. He had a younger brother named Sergey. His parents divorced in the mid-1950s, so the young Alexander was primarily taken care of by his mother and grandparents, but reportedly never experienced any traumatic incidents during his childhood. Bushuyev became interested in plants and herbs at the age of 7 thanks to his grandmother, who was considered the village herbalist.

After graduating from school, Bushuyev enrolled in a vocational school but was forced to leave in the late 1960s because his mother fell ill. Over the next few years, he worked in various professions, including as a carpenter, concrete worker and security guard at the Arkhangelsk State Technical University. His colleagues described Bushuyev in a positive manner, describing him as diligent, responsible and efficient, but at the same time, they also said that he had a knack for scheming and adventurism.

=== Marriage, health issues and gardening ===
In the 1970s, Bushuyev married and had a daughter. Relatives described him as a kind, sympathetic and hard-working man who devoted most of his free time to his family and doting on his daughter. In 1996, he got a job at an insurance agency in Arkhangelsk but frequently had to change jobs due to health issues. At the time, he had been diagnosed with a number of diseases, including epilepsy, hypertension and even suffered from several strokes, due to which Bushuyev was granted a disability pension.

In 2003, Bushuyev retired from his workplace and focused his attention on social activities. Since 1990, he engaged in gardening, growing many promising and fast-growing trees in mixed plantings. At the time, Arkhangelsk had a lot of unattended parks and squares, with a multitude of trees being planted without any rules and regulations, or taking their species and distance to residential buildings into account. Although a law regarding gardening was passed by the city's mayor in 2000, it was regarded as ineffective due to the abolition of several structural subdivisions responsible for organizing landscaping and gardening.

In the mid-2000s, the Mayor's Office drafted a new law, the "Rules of landscaping and gardening", which included sections related to defining the boundaries of adjacent territories for proper sanitation and maintenance for landscaping projects. The delineation of responsibilities for cleaning of territories between owners, land users, landowners and tenants of buildings, constructions and other objects were also defined. Having learned about this, Bushuyev contacted the Mayor of Arkhangelsk, Alexander Donskoy, in 2005, and offered his services. Donskoy approved, and for the next year or so, Bushuyev planted saplings of fir, rowans and other trees free of charge, thanks to which he gained popularity amongst locals. By 2006, already regarded as a major specialist in this field, Bushuyev made proposals on the greening of Arkhangelsk, stating that there was a necessity to plant different types of plants with longer lifespans and restore the cedar park. Shortly afterwards, Donskoy established the so-called 'Green Council' in Arkhangelsk City Hall, a special committee to deal with improving greening projects in the city.

In the next three years, Bushuyev actively engaged in community work, building several tree and seedling nurseries in several plots of land allocated to him by the local government. Due to his initiatives and popular proposals, the next mayor of Arkhangelsk, Viktor Pavlenko, appointed Bushuyev as the head of the Green Council. In this position, he continued making various proposals for landscaping and beautification of Arkhangelsk, suggesting that additional recreational areas, benches and paths should be created. With his direct participation, several fir planting campaigns were held in the city, based on the results of research Bushuyev had discussed with botanical specialists. On his initiative, several such nurseries with closed root systems were implemented for the first time in Russia: cedars, oaks, maples, ash trees, chestnuts, thuja and others. It has been claimed that he planted more than 12,000 trees and shrubs in the city throughout the years.

== Exposure ==
=== Murders ===
Bushuyev first came to the attention of law enforcement agencies in July 1999. On 20 July of that year, an 11-year-old boy, who was visiting his grandmother at her dacha, disappeared in the Isakogorsky district of Arkhangelsk. After several days of searching through surrounding fields, roads, ravines and woodlands by officers and volunteer citizens alike, Bushuyev - a neighbour of the boy's grandmother - reported to police that he had found the remains on 27 July. He immediately became a suspect due to the fact that two years earlier, in late November 1997, the corpse of a 13-year-old was found in the vicinity of his dacha. Bushuyev actively participated in the searches and expressed his own theories about what had happened, claiming that he had found the body accidentally when he saw a sackcloth sticking out of the ground. However, nothing suspicious was reported at the location on previous searches.

Experts determined that the boy had been tortured and sexually violated in a brutal manner, after which he was strangled. His burial site was located 150 metres away from his relatives' house, and about 90 metres from Bushuyev's house. Between 2001 and 2002, the remains of four others were found in the same area of Arkhangelsk, with investigators identifying all but one of the victims. Of the three identified victims, one was a teenager and the other two were young acquaintances of Bushuyev who were reportedly last seen in his company before their disappearance. All the victims appeared to be prepubescent or teenage males of similar appearance who were extroverted and had no trouble making friends.

In October 2002, a 15-year-old pupil of a remedial school in Arkhangelsk disappeared without a trace, having last been seen near the Obvodniy Canal and Gagarin Street. His dismembered remains were soon discovered in a drainage ditch near a bus stop, not far from Bushuyev's house. During the investigation, a cinematographer and a dog picked up a trail from the remains, which directly led to the front gate of Bushuyev's dacha.

The investigation revealed that Bushuyev's colleague, who was working as a janitor at the time, was the missing teenager's alcoholic father, whom Bushuyev would visit often. This led to speculation that Bushuyev possibly formed a friendly bond with the teenager and then invited them to his house, with suspicions increasing after acquaintances and neighbours recalled that they had seen a lot of young people and teenagers had been visiting him. A number of local youth were interviewed, with some claiming that Bushuyev had approached them under various pretexts and attempted to lure them to his dacha, often introducing himself as a university teacher, professor, endocrinologist and other professions, whilst also pointing out that he had connections to local officials.

Based on this, Bushuyev was soon arrested. Since a number of the victims' remains had shown cuts and chopping wounds, axes, sharp tools and cutting equipment with traces of blood were seized from his house. However, due to the small amount of blood found, forensic experts were unable to determine whether it was human or not, and Bushuyev himself refused to cooperate with authorities. According to one of the investigators, Col. Vladimir Shevchenko, the moment he entered the investigation room, Bushuyev turned towards the room's corner, covered his ears with his hands and refused to talk without the presence of a lawyer.

=== Release, re-investigation and second arrest ===
By the end of 2002, due to the lack of evidence directly implicating Bushuyev in the murders, he was released and the investigation into the murders was suspended. Using his connections with the Arkhangelsk City Hall, Bushuyev soon demanded an official apology from law enforcement authorities - his demand was fulfilled in July 2004, when the deputy prosecutor of the Arkhangelsk Oblast, Alexander Kroshenitsyn, penned a written apology to him.

A second investigation was authorized in February 2009 at the behest of the regional Investigative Committee. As a result, forensic experts analyzed hacksaws and axes seized from Bushuyev, studying the surface of the blades, as well as chips and serrations on the shapes. After that, they examined traces of the injuries inflicted on the skull of one of the victims, which had likely left jagged marks on the murder weapon. The results of this inspection established 26 identification matches, indicating that the victim had been killed with Bushuyev's axe. As a result, Bushuyev was arrested for a second time on 9 June 2009, on charges of two counts of murder, robbery and theft.

== Trials, sentence and aftermath ==
=== First trial ===
Bushuyev was charged with four of the murders, those being of the victims killed from 2000 to 2001. Investigators claimed that he dismembered the bodies and disposed of some remains in drainage ditches near his house. The motive was apparently sexual, but it was also noted that Bushuyev stole the victims' personal belongings and apartment keys, using the latter to steal additional items from one victim's home amounting to 7,100 rubles. Bushuyev himself refused to cooperate during interrogations, continuing to claim that he had nothing to do with the killings. In July 2010, the investigation was completed and the criminal case was referred to the Arkhangelsk Regional Court. Before his trial could begin, Bushuyev underwent a psychiatric evaluation at the request of his lawyers, the results of which established that he was sane, albeit suffering from a pedophilic disorder.

The trial began in autumn 2010, and by mid-November Bushuyev was found guilty of the four murders by jury verdict. During sentencing hearings, the prosecutors demanded a life sentence, while Bushuyev himself continued to insist that he was innocent. On 30 November 2010, the Arkhangelsk Regional Court sentenced the 61-year-old to 25 years imprisonment, the maximum available penalty under the Russian criminal code due to his advanced age. It also ruled that he had to pay 4 million rubles in damages to the victims' family members, as he had also been found liable for their deaths in a civil lawsuit.

After his conviction, Bushuyev was transferred to the IK-12 penal colony in the Kholmogorsky District.

=== Second trial ===
In 2015, Dmitry Ananyin, a senior investigator for the Investigative Committee of Russia for the Arkhangelsk Oblast and the Yamalo-Nenets Autonomous Okrug, started reinvestigating cold case murders which he believed might be connected to Bushuyev. Ananyin and his team re-interviewed the victims' relatives and newfound witnesses, then proceeded to utilize new forensic technology on the victims' clothes in an attempt to link them to Bushuyev. The results of these tests showed that small pieces of epithelial tissues belonging to Bushuyev were found on the clothes of the deceased, and in December 2015, he was charged with one of the murders he had not been prosecuted for previously. On 17 May 2016, he was charged with two other murders committed between 1997 and 2002, and in June of that year, he was extradited from the penal colony to a detention centre in Arkhangelsk to await trial.

The second trial began at the end of 2016, and in early 2017, the now-68-year-old Bushuyev was found guilty of sexually assaulting and murdering the three victims, for which he was sentenced to an additional 19 years imprisonment on 3 February 2017. These are to be served concurrently with his previous sentence of 25 years imprisonment. Sometime afterwards, Bushuyev and his lawyers filed an appeal requesting that the guilty verdict and the convictions be annulled, but it was denied by the courts in May. He was then returned to the penal colony, where he remains to this day.

== See also ==
- List of Russian serial killers
