= College of Agriculture =

College of Agriculture may refer to:

- a college that provides agricultural education
- College of Agriculture in Gonbad, Iran
- College of Agriculture, Hormozgan, Iran
- College of Agriculture, Latur, India
- College of Agriculture, Pantnagar, India
