= Xie Suyuan =

Chinese chemist

- 谢素原
- Born: April 1968 (age 58); Fujian, China
- Education: Fujian Normal University; Kunming Institute of Precious Metals; Xiamen University
- Known for: Research on fullerenes, non-classical fullerenes, and carbon clusters
- Awards: Member of the Chinese Academy of Sciences; Changjiang Scholar Distinguished Professor; National Natural Science Award
- Scientific career
- Fields: Inorganic chemistry, fullerene chemistry, carbon cluster chemistry
- Workplaces: Xiamen University; Fujian Agriculture and Forestry University

Xie Suyuan (Chinese: 谢素原; born April 1968), also rendered as Su-Yuan Xie, is a Chinese inorganic chemist whose research focuses on fullerene chemistry and carbon cluster chemistry. He is a professor at Xiamen University and a member of the Chinese Academy of Sciences. In April 2026, Xie was appointed president of Fujian Agriculture and Forestry University.

Xie has worked on the synthesis, isolation, structural characterization, and functionalization of non-classical fullerenes and other carbon cluster materials.

== Early life and education ==
Xie was born in April 1968 in Fujian, China. He received a bachelor's degree from the Department of Chemistry of Fujian Normal University in 1988. He later studied at Central South University of Technology and the Kunming Institute of Precious Metals, receiving a master's degree in 1991.

From 1996 to 1999, Xie studied at Xiamen University, where he received a doctorate in chemistry. He subsequently remained at Xiamen University as a faculty member.

== Academic career ==
After completing his doctoral studies, Xie joined Xiamen University, where he has held positions in the College of Chemistry and Chemical Engineering. He later became a professor and doctoral supervisor.

From 2003 to 2005, Xie carried out visiting research at Clemson University in the United States on topics related to nanomaterials. In 2004, he became a professor in the Department of Chemistry at Xiamen University.

Xie has been affiliated with the State Key Laboratory of Physical Chemistry of Solid Surfaces at Xiamen University. In 2021, he was elected as an academician of the Chinese Academy of Sciences. In 2022, he became director of the State Key Laboratory of Physical Chemistry of Solid Surfaces, according to Chinese-language biographical sources.

In April 2026, Fujian Agriculture and Forestry University announced that Xie had been appointed president of the university.

== Research ==
Xie's research is primarily associated with fullerene chemistry, non-classical fullerenes, carbon clusters, and carbon-based nanomaterials. His work includes the synthesis, separation, structural characterization, and functionalization of fullerene cages and related carbon cluster materials.He has also worked on combustion and arc-discharge synthesis, chromatographic separation, and crystallographic structural characterization of new fullerene structures.

According to Xiamen University, Xie's group discovered the principles of "tension release" and "local aromatization" for stabilizing novel fullerene-based materials. These principles were described as enabling the preparation of fullerene structures containing adjacent pentagons, thereby going beyond restrictions associated with the isolated-pentagon rule.

== Honours and awards ==
In 2001, he received the Chinese Chemical Society Young Chemist Award. In 2005, he received support from the National Science Fund for Distinguished Young Scholars.

He received the Second Prize of the National Natural Science Award of China in 2006 and again in 2015. In 2009, he was appointed a Changjiang Scholar Distinguished Professor.

In 2021, Xie was elected a member of the Chinese Academy of Sciences.

== Academic service ==
Xie has served as an associate editor of Science Bulletin and editor-in-chief of the Journal of Xiamen University (Natural Science).

== Selected publications ==
- Tan, Yuan-Zhi; Xie, Su-Yuan (2011). "The stabilization of fused-pentagon fullerene molecules". Nature Chemistry. 3 (4): 331–337. doi:10.1038/nchem.1008. PMID 21378913.
- "C60 Fullerene as the Active Site for CO2 Electroreduction". PubMed.
- Wei, Tao; Wang, Song; Liu, Fupin; Tan, Yuan-Zhi; Zhu, Xianjun; Xie, Suyuan; Yang, Shangfeng. "Capturing the Long-Sought Small-Bandgap Endohedral Fullerene Sc3N@C82 with Low Kinetic Stability". Journal of the American Chemical Society. 2015. 137(8), 3119–3123. doi:10.1021/jacs.5b00199.
- Xiang, Wenhao; Jiang, Xiaole; Yao, Yang-Rong; Xin, Jinpeng; Jin, Huaimin; Guan, Runnan; Zhang, Qianyan; Chen, Muqing; Xie, Su-Yuan; Popov, Alexey A.; Yang, Shangfeng (2022-11-30). "Monometallic Endohedral Azafullerene". Journal of the American Chemical Society. 144 (47): 21587–21595. doi:10.1021/jacs.2c08679. ISSN 0002-7863.
- Li, Fei; Liu, Jin-Ying; Chen, Bin-Wen; Ma, Wen-Bin; Xuan, Jun; Deng, Lin-Long; Xie, Su-Yuan (2025-02-21). "KO t Bu-Promoted [3 + 2] Cycloaddition of Dimethyl Sulfoxide with Fullerenes". Organic Letters. 27 (7): 1631–1637. doi:10.1021/acs.orglett.4c04802. ISSN 1523-7060.
- Wu, Yin-Fu; Wang, Shan-Shan; Yao, Chun-Rui; Chen, Zuo-Chang; Li, Shu-Hui; Yao, Yang-Rong; Zhang, Xue-Peng; Su, Yin; Deng, Shun-Liu; Zhang, Qianyan; Gao, Fei; Xie, Su-Yuan; Huang, Rong-Bin; Zheng, Lan-Sun (2019-10-04). "General One-step Synthesis of Symmetrical or Unsymmetrical 1,4-Di(organo)fullerenes from Organo(hydro)fullerenes through Direct Oxidative Arylation". The Journal of Organic Chemistry. 84 (19): 12259–12267. doi:10.1021/acs.joc.9b01272. ISSN 0022-3263.

== See also ==
- Xiamen University
- Chinese Academy of Sciences
- Fujian Agriculture and Forestry University
