= Rottenburg University of Applied Forest Sciences =

Higher education institution in Rottenburg am Neckar, Baden-Württemberg, Germany

- Hochschule für Forstwirtschaft Rottenburg
- Type: Fachhochschule (University of Applied Sciences)
- Established: 1954
- Rector: Bastian Kaiser
- Academic staff: 26
- Students: 850 ( 2012)
- Location: Rottenburg am Neckar, Baden-Württemberg, Germany; 48°27′29″N 8°56′39″E
- Campus: Rural
- Website: hs-rottenburg.net

The Rottenburg University of Applied Forest Sciences (in German: Hochschule für Forstwirschaft Rottenburg) is a Fachhochschule (university of applied sciences) in Rottenburg am Neckar, in the German state of Baden-Württemberg. The special profile of the university is the principle of sustainable development. In April 2008, the university was winner of the contest "Profile and Cooperation – excellence strategies for small and middle universities". The contest was announced by the "Founder's Organization for German Sciences" and the "Heinz Nixdorf Foundation". In 1954, the State of Baden-Württemberg founded a forestry school in Rottenburg am Neckar. In the 1970s, the school was commuted to a vocational school of forestry. And finally in 1979 it was made a Fachhochschule (University of Applied Sciences). In the beginning the university served only as a training school for forest officers in the upper grade of the civil service of the states Baden-Württemberg, Rhineland-Palatinate and Saarland. Since 1995 the university is publicly available.

== Schadenweilerhof ==
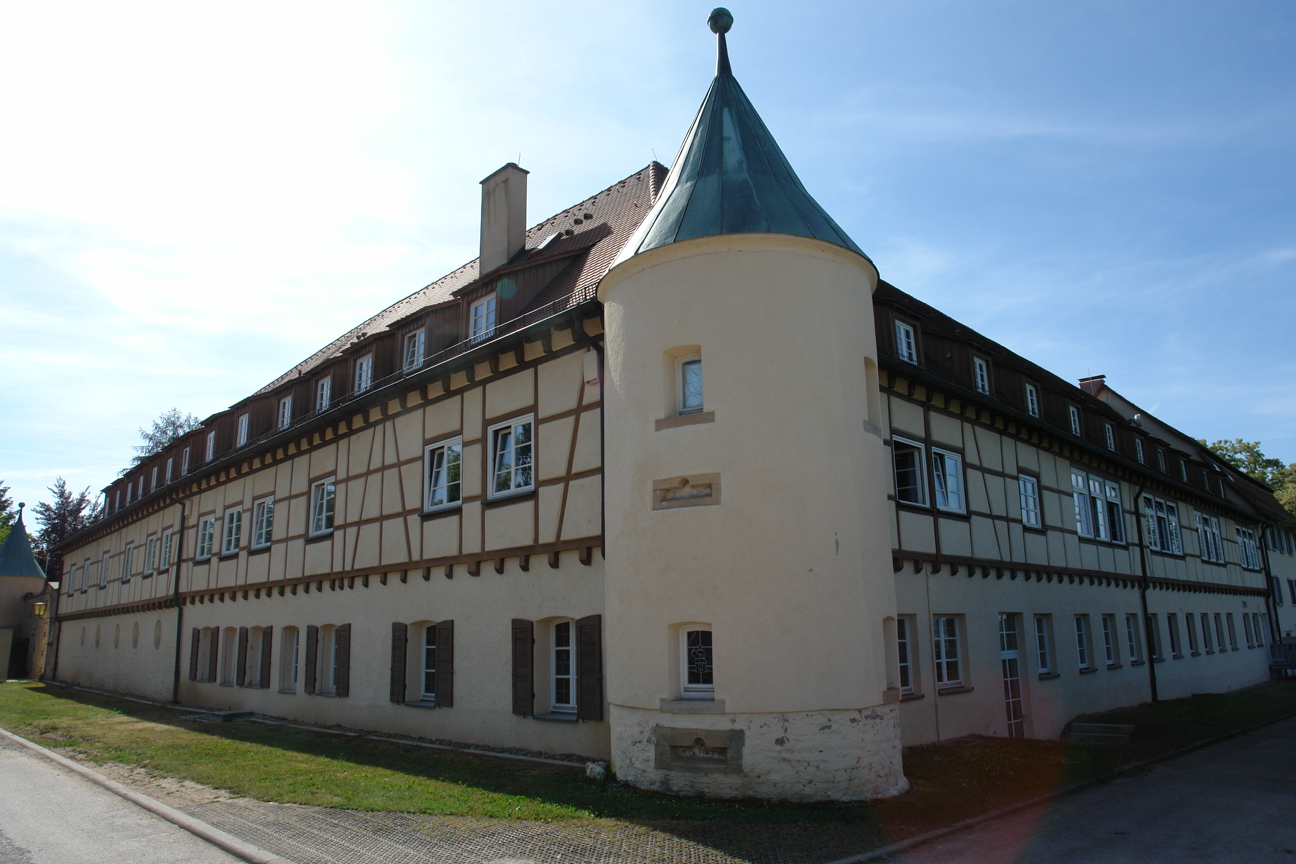
Schadenweiler estate

The university is located in the "Schadenweilerhof" (Schadenweiler estate) about two kilometers (ca. one mile) southern of the town, near the Rammert forest. On the place where the university is located today, the village Schadenweiler was situated until the 15th century. The village was donated to the Hirsau Abbey around 1100. By the 15th century, Schadenweiler vanished, the villagers vacated. In 1570 Werner von Themar established a noblemen's estate on the boundary. During a siege in the 17th century the estate was nearly entirely destroyed. Later on the estate devolved to the Spital and the Town of Rottenburg. The manor burned down several times.

== See also ==
- List of forestry universities and colleges
