= Fujian Agriculture and Forestry University =

Provincial public university in Fuzhou, Fujian, China

- 福建农林大学
- Motto: 明德 诚智 博学 创新
- Motto in English: Excellent virtue, true wisdom, successful learning, innovation
- Type: Public
- Established: 2000
- President: Xie Suyuan
- Location: Fuzhou, Fujian, China; 26°5′16″N 119°14′6″E
- Campus: Urban
- Website: english.fafu.edu.cn

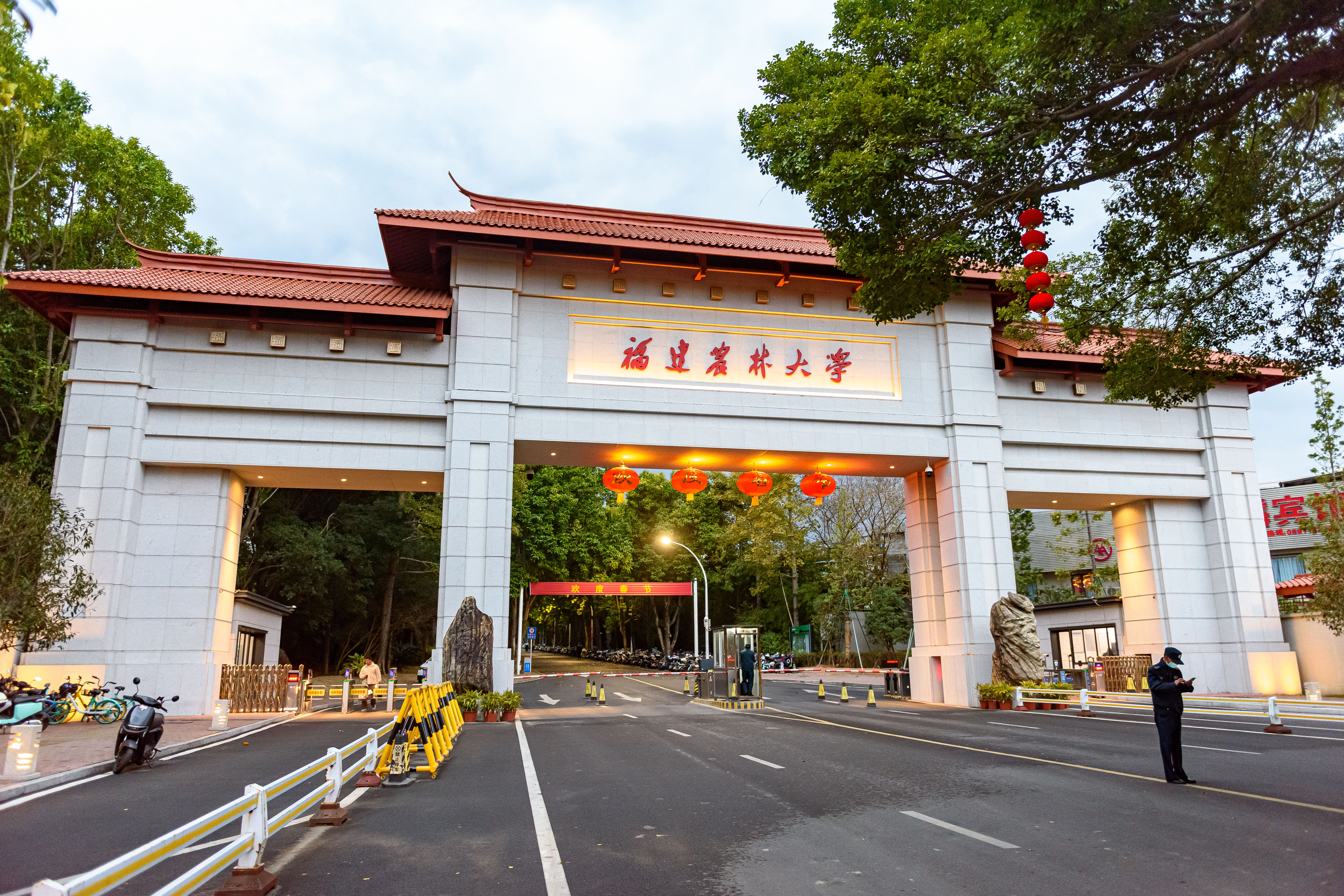
FAFU main campus

Fujian Agriculture and Forestry University (FAFU) is a provincial public university of agriculture and forestry in Fuzhou, Fujian, China. It is affiliated with the Province of Fujian, and co-funded by the Fujian Provincial People's Government, the Ministry of Agriculture and Rural Affairs, and the National Forestry and Grassland Administration.

In 1952, Fujian Agricultural College was established by the merger of the then Agricultural College of Xiamen University (厦门大学农学院) and the then Agricultural College of Fuzhou University (福州大学农学院). In October 2000, the then Fujian Agricultural University and the then Fujian Forestry College (福建林学院) merged to form the new Fujian Agricultural and Forestry University.

== History ==
The historical changes of the university are shown below.

Agricultural Department of Fukien Christian College; Autumn, 1936
Agricultural College of Fukien Christian University; Spring, 1940	Fujian Provincial Agriculture College; June, 1940
Agricultural College of Fuzhou University; April, 1951	Agricultural College of Amoy University; June, 1951
Fujian Agriculture College; August, 1952
Zhangzhou Division	Department of Forestry
Zhangzhou Agriculture College; September, 1960 - July, 1962	Fujian Forestry College; November, 1958 - March, 1972
Fujian Agriculture and Forestry University; March, 1972
Fujian Agriculture College; May, 1975	Fujian Forestry College; May, 1975
Fujian Agriculture University; January, 1994
Fujian Agriculture and Forestry University; October, 2000
