= Norwegian University College of Green Development =

Location
- Bryne, Rogaland; Norway
- Coordinates: 58°44′11″N 5°38′58″E

Information
- Head teacher: Dag Jørund Lønning
- Website: https://hgut.no/

The Norwegian University College of Green Development (Norwegian: Høgskulen for Grøn Utvikling, HGUt) formerly Norwegian University College for Agriculture and Rural Development is a small private university college in Bryne, Jæren, south of Stavanger, Norway. The rector is a rural anthropologist, Prof. Dag Jørund Lønning.

== Mission ==
The HGUt teaches and researches in the fields of innovation, agriculture and rural development. It offers a BA in innovation and regenerative development. Study is possible through online learning, with only a few days per month residence on campus. It receives a core grant from the Norwegian government as well as student fee and project income.

== Research ==
HGUt has research and development projects funded by the European Union and national grants, focusing on rural and agricultural development and innovation, cultural landscape management and soil protection, demographic development and rural/regional tourism.
