= Dr. Yashwant Singh Parmar University of Horticulture and Forestry =

Agricultural school in Solan, India

- Motto: Education Research and Extension
- Type: Public
- Established: 1985; 41 years ago
- Affiliations: UGC, ICAR, ICFRE
- Chancellor: Governor of Himachal Pradesh
- Vice-Chancellor: Harminder Singh Bewaja (additional charge)
- Location: Solan, Himachal Pradesh, India; 30.865°N 77.169°E
- Campus: Rural
- Website: uhf.ac.in,yspuniversity.ac.in

Dr. Yashwant Singh Parmar University of Horticulture and Forestry Solan Himachal Pradesh, known by the abbreviation YSP UHF, is a state university located in district Solan, Himachal Pradesh, India. It has exclusive mandate of education, research and extension in horticulture and forestry.

It covers 5.5 square kilometres (2.1 sq mi) and is situated in Nauni on the Solan-Rajgarh Road. The campus lies 15 kilometres (9.3 mi) from the town of Solan.

== History ==
The Himachal Agricultural College, Solan was established in 1962 and affiliated to the Panjab University. S. S. Jain, Mycologist & Plant Pathologist was the Officer on Special Duty (OSD) appointed by the HP State Government Department of Agriculture to set it up. In 1970 the Himachal Pradesh University was established and the college became one of its campuses. In 1978 it became the horticulture complex of the recently established Himachal Pradesh Krishi Vishvavidyalaya. Finally, on 1 December 1985 it was upgraded to a State University and named after Yashwant Singh Parmar, the first Chief Minister of Himachal Pradesh. It was inaugurated on 30 April 1988 by the late Rajiv Gandhi, Prime Minister of India.

== Academics ==
It offers undergraduate, postgraduate and doctoral courses in horticulture, forestry and allied disciplines.

Dr. Yashwant Singh Parmar University of Horticulture and Forestry has three colleges: the College of Horticulture, the College of Forestry, and the College of Horticulture and Forestry Neri, India (Hamirpur), College of Horticulture and Forestry Thunag (Mandi, Himachal Pradesh) which are subdivided into 14 departments and are looked after by a faculty of over 500 scientists and teachers. It has a school specialised in the study of apples, called Apple School, Nauni. The department of management is under the college of horticulture providing degree in three basic courses: Marketing, Finance, and Human Resources with agribusiness.

== Rankings ==
The NIRF (National Institutional Ranking Framework) ranked it 18th among Agriculture institutes in India and 151-200 overall in 2024.
