= Arkhangelsk State Technical University =

- Архангельский государственный технический университет
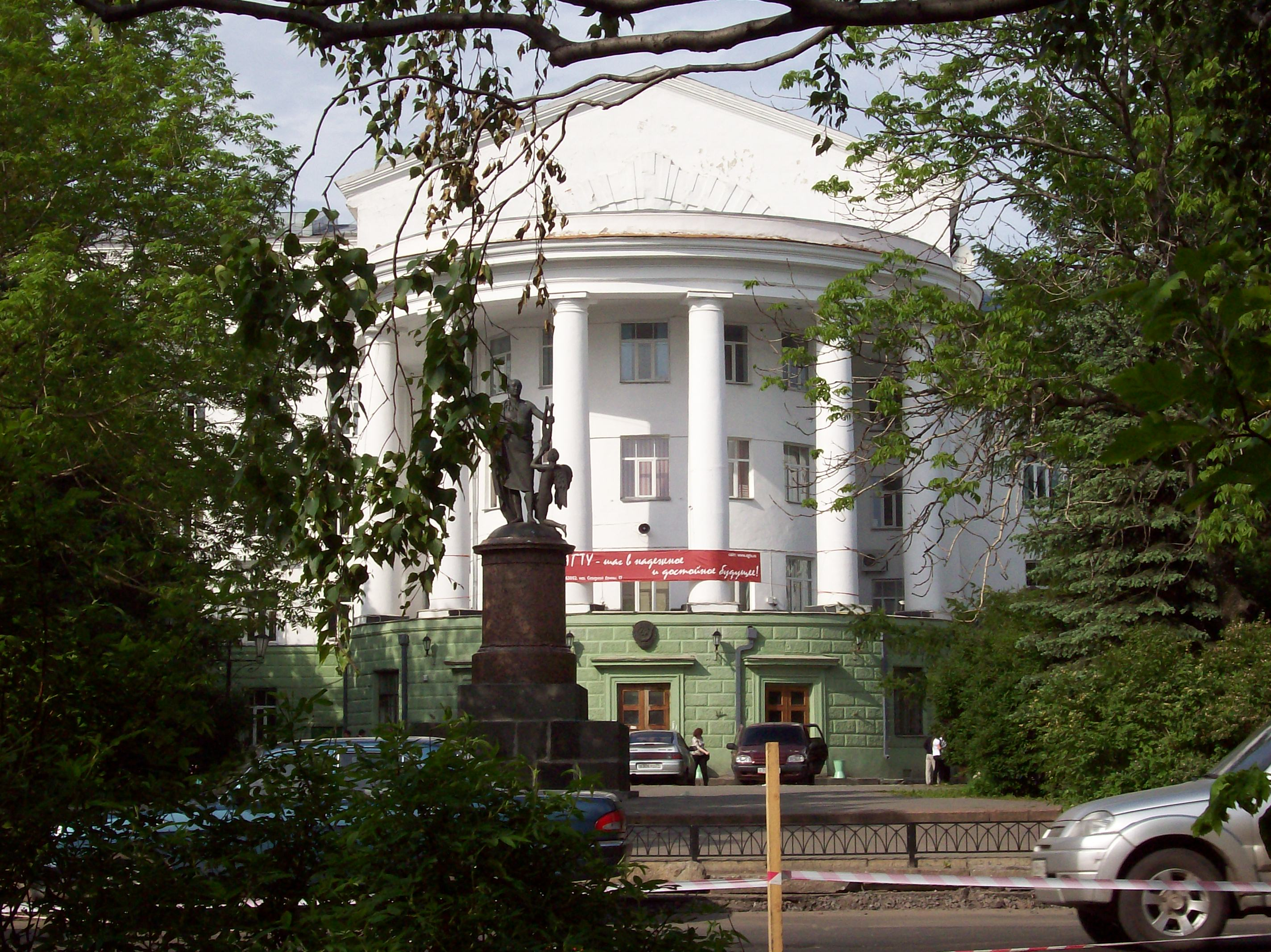
- Type: Public
- Established: 1994
- Affiliations: UArctic
- Rector: Alexander Nevzorov
- Location: Arkhangelsk, Arkhangelsk Oblast, Russia; 64°31′44″N 40°32′57″E
- Website: www.agtu.ru

Arkhangelsk State Technical University (Russian: Архангельский государственный технический университет) is a university founded in 1994. The university was created on the basis of the Arkhangelsk Forestry Engineering Institute. This university is composed of at least eight faculties and four institutes. The rector is Alexandr Nevzorov and the vice rector for foreign affairs is Galina Kamarova.

== See also ==
- List of forestry universities and colleges
