= Nauni =

- Town
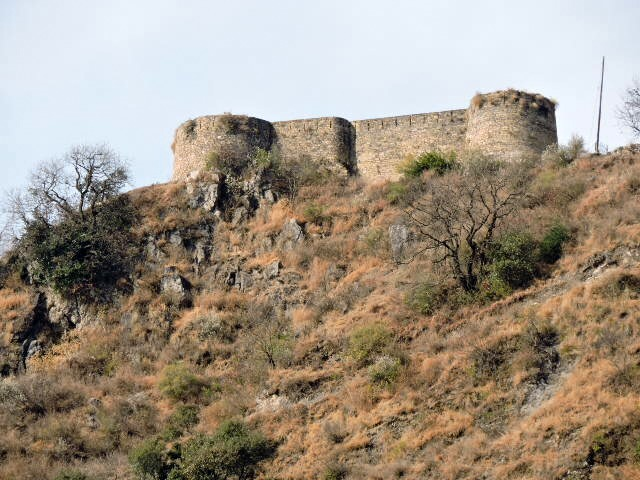
- Nauni Fort

- Location in Himachal Pradesh, India Nauni (India)
- Coordinates: 30.8625118°N 77.1679151°E
- Country: India
- State: Himachal Pradesh
- District: Solan

Languages
  - Official: Hindi
  - Regional: Mahasui (Baghati)
- Time zone: UTC+5:30 (IST)
- PIN: 173230
- Telephone code: 01792
- Vehicle registration: HP HP 14
- Nearest city: Solan
- Lok Sabha constituency: Shimla
- Vidhan Sabha constituency: Solan

Nauni is a small town on the Solan-Rajgarh Road about 15 km from the town of Solan, Himachal Pradesh, India. The Dr. Yashwant Singh Parmar University of Horticulture and Forestry campus is situated there. The ruins of an old Gorkha fort on the hill can be found overlooking the campus and can be reached about an hours climb from the road side. Giri River is about 9 km from here.
