= University of Parakou =

Public university in Parakou, Benin

- Université de Parakou
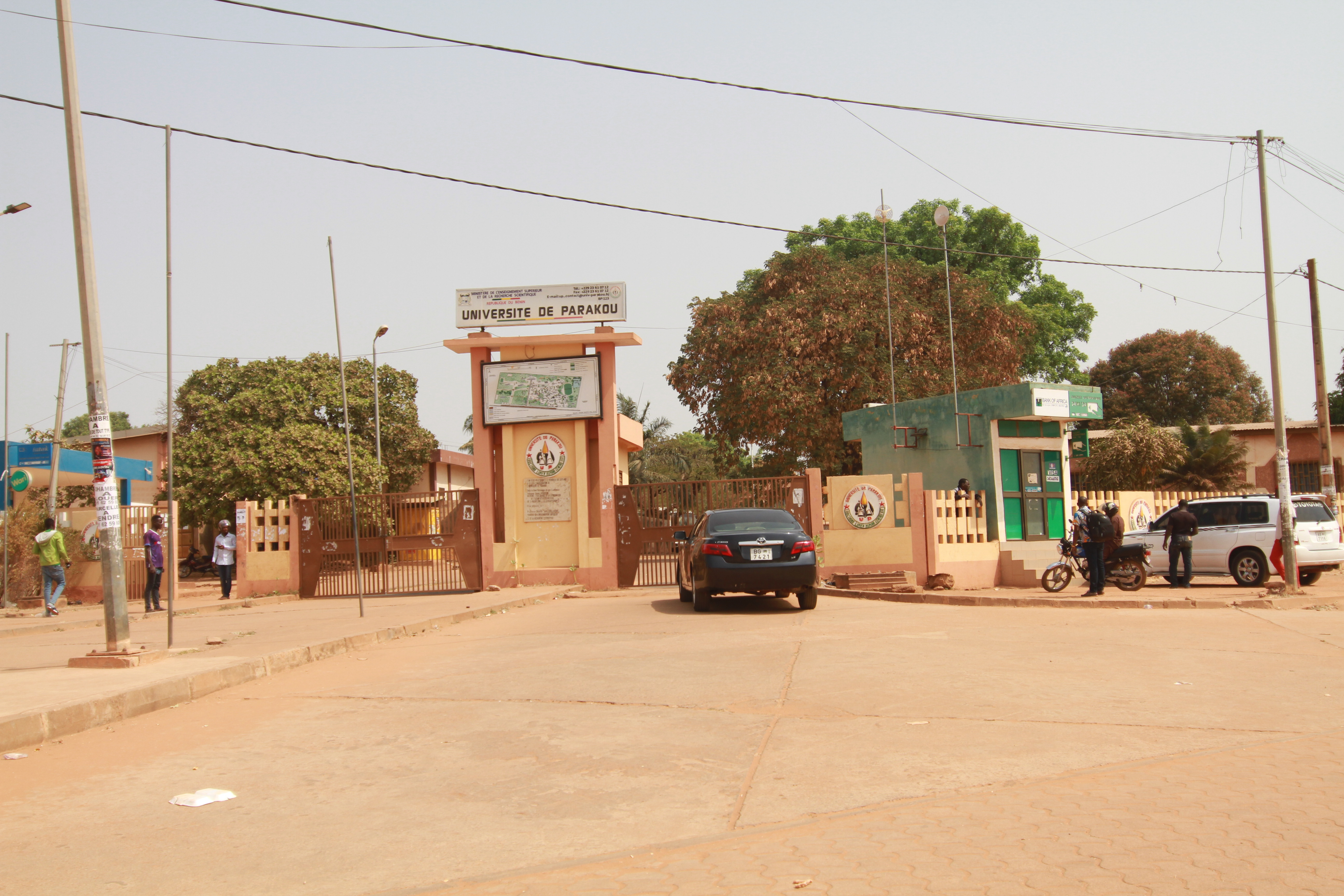
- The university in 2022
- Motto: Doctrina lumen humani generis est
- Type: Public university
- Established: 2001; 25 years ago
- Rector: Bertrand Sogbossi Bocco
- Location: Parakou, Benin; 9.338°N 2.645°E
- Campus: Parakou University Campus
- Language: French
- Affiliations: Association of African Universities; Agence universitaire de la Francophonie; CRUFAOCI; REESAO
- Website: www.univ-parakou.bj

The University of Parakou (UP) is a university in Parakou, in the northern region of Benin. It is the second public university in the Republic of Benin, following the University of Abomey-Calavi.

In the 2010s Benin officially had seven public universities, including those in Kétou, Abomey, Lokossa, Porto-Novo, and Natitingou. The latter resulted from the University of Parakou losing its university centers in Djougou and Natitingou.

== History ==
Founded on 18 September 2001 as an autonomous national institution (decree n°2001-365), the University of Parakou is a public, scientific, technical, and cultural university with legal personality and financial autonomy.

== Organization ==
UP consists of 11 training entities distributed among faculties, institutes of professional training, and doctoral schools.

=== List of rectors, 2001–2014 ===
N°	Name	Period
1	Michel Boko	2001–2002
2	D. Gilbert Avode	2002–2003
3	Alexis Hountondji	2003–2006
4	A. Simon Akpona	2006–2012
5	Barthélémy Biao	2012–2014
6	Prosper Gandaho	2014–2020
7	Bertrand Sogbossi Bocco	2021–present

=== Training entities ===
Entity	Programs
FA	– Plant Production Sciences and Techniques (STPV) – Natural Resources Management (AGRN) – Animal Production Sciences and Techniques (STPA) – Rural Economics and Sociology (ESR) – Nutrition and Agro-Food Sciences and Techniques (NSAA)
FM	– General Medicine
IFSIO	– Nursing and Obstetric Care
FDSP	– Private Law – Public Law – Political Science and International Relations >>Masters programs – Corporate and Business Law (JEA) – Labor Administration and Social Protection (ATPS) – Local Administration and Sustainable Development (ALDD) – Public Services Administration and Public Litigation Management (ASPGCP) – Public Procurement and Public-Private Partnership (M3P) – International Policy and Interest Representation (RIPI)
FASEG	– ECONOMICS: >>International Economics and Finance (EFI) >>Economic Analysis and Policy (APE) >>Agricultural Economics (EA) >>Local Finance and Economics (EFCL) – MANAGEMENT: >>Finance and Accounting (FC) >>Marketing and Organizational Management (MMO) >>Entrepreneurship and Business Management (EGE)
FLASH	– Department of Geography and Land Management – Department of Sociology and Anthropology – Department of English Studies – Department of Modern Languages – Department of Hispanic Studies – Department of German Studies
IUT	>>Bachelor programs – Bank Management (GB) – Business Management (GE) – IT Management (IG) – Transport and Logistics Management (GTL) – Commercial Management (GC) – Human Resources Management (GRH) >>Masters programs – Geosciences and Land Management – Sociology and Social Mediation – English Studies
EDSAE	– PhD in Natural Resource Economics (ERN) – PhD in Natural Resource Sociology (SRN) – PhD in Animal Production (PA) – PhD in Plant Protection (PV) – PhD in Natural Resources Management and Planning (AGRN) – PhD in Biodiversity Monitoring and Conservation (MCB) – PhD in Population, Demography, and Environment (PDE)
ENATSE	– Professional License in Public Health: Epidemiological Surveillance Option
ENSPD	– Applied Statistics and Planning and Evaluation
EDSJPA	– Law and Political Science

=== University centers ===
Since 2016 the University no longer has university centers. But within the university there are non-governmental organizations (NGOs) such as the "Amour et Vie" Center and the Center for Well-being in the Fight Against AIDS (CBELS), which raise awareness about HIV/AIDS and also hepatitis.
