= College of Agriculture in Gonbad =

Agricultural school in Gonbad-e Qabus, Iran

The College of Agriculture in Gonbad was first established as a junior college in 1985 in the city of Gonbad-e Qabus, Iran. The junior college changed into the Gonbad College in 1999. Associate degree courses in fields such as crop production and technology, forest technology, range and watershed management, wood technology, fisheries and animal sciences are offered at the college.
