= Association of African Universities =

Organization

- اتحاد الجامعات الأفريقية (Arabic); Association des universités africaines (French); Associação das Universidades Africanas (Portuguese); የአፍሪካ ዩኒቨርስቲዎች ማህበር (Amharic); Chama cha Vyuo Vikuu Afrika (Swahili)
- Abbreviation: AAU
- Formation: November 12, 1967
- Founder: African universities initiated by UNESCO
- Founded at: Rabat, Morocco
- Location: Accra, Ghana
- Origins: 1962 UNESCO Summit in Antananarivo, followed by the 1963 Khartoum preparatory committee meeting
- Region served: Africa
- Fields: International cooperation in higher education
- Website: www.aau.org

The Association of African Universities (AAU; Arabic: اتحاد الجامعات الأفريقية; French: Association des universités africaines) is a university association of African universities based in Accra, Ghana. AAU provides a forum for cooperation and exchange of information on higher education and research policies.

== History ==
AAU was founded in Rabat, Morocco on November 12, 1967, following recommendations made at an earlier conference organized by the United Nations Educational Scientific and Cultural Organization (UNESCO) in Antananarivo, Madagascar, in September 1962.

The Antananarivo recommendations were taken up by a preparatory committee of the heads of African institutions of higher education, which met in Khartoum in September 1963 and drafted the founding constitution of the association. With an initial membership of 34, the association now has over 373 members from 46 countries.

The association convenes African higher education institutional leaders and policy-makers on issues related to African higher education and development.

== Members ==
Institution	Country	Membership
2ie - Institut International d'Ingenierie de l'Eau et de l'Environnement	Burkina Faso	Full
Abdou Moumouni University	Niger	Full
Abia State University	Nigeria	Full
Abm University College	Botswana	Associate
Abubakar Tafawa Balewa University	Nigeria	Full
Accra Institute of Technology	Ghana	Full
Accra Technical University	Ghana	Full
Adama Science and Technology University	Ethiopia	Full
Adamawa State University	Nigeria	Full
Addis Ababa Science and Technology University	Ethiopia	Full
Adekunle Ajasin University	Nigeria	Full
Admiralty University of Nigeria	Nigeria	Associate
Afe Babalola University	Nigeria	Full
AFI – the University of Business	Senegal	Full
Africa University	Zimbabwe	Full
African University of Communications and Business	Ghana	Full
African University of Science and Technology	Nigeria	Associate
Afro-American University of Central Africa	Equitorial Guinea	Associate
Agitel Formation	Côte d'Ivoire	Full
Agostinho Neto University	Angola	Full
Ahfad University For Women	Sudan	Full
Ahmadu Bello University	Nigeria	Full
Ain Shams University	Egypt	Full
Ajayi Crowther University	Nigeria	Full
Akenten Appiah-Menka University of Skills Training and Entrepreneurial Development	Ghana	Full
Al Asmariya University of Islamic Sciences	Libya	Full
Al Fashir University	Sudan	Full
Al Neelain University	Sudan	Full
Al Qasimia University	United Arab Emirates	Full
Al Yarmourk College	Sudan	Full
Al-Azhar University	Egypt	Full
Al-Hikmah University	Nigeria	Full
Alexandria Higher Institute of Engineering and Technology	Egypt	Full
Alexandria University	Egypt	Full
All Nations University College	Ghana	Full
Alzaiem Alazhari University	Sudan	Full
Ambrose Alli University	Nigeria	Full
American International University	Gambia	Full
Ardhi University	Tanzania	Full
Ashesi University College	Ghana	Full
Assiut University	Egypt	Full
Aswan University	Egypt	Full
Babcock University	Nigeria	Full
Badr University in Cairo	Egypt	Full
Bayan College of Science and Technology	Sudan	Associate
Bayero University	Nigeria	Full
Bells University of Technology	Nigeria	Full
Benadir University	Somalia	Associate
Benha University	Egypt	Full
Benue State University	Nigeria	Full
Bindura University of Science Education	Zimbabwe	Full
Bluecrest University College	Ghana	Associate
Boston City Campus	South Africa	Full
Botho University	Botswana	Full
Botswana Accountancy College	Botswana	Full
Botswana International University of Science and Technology	Botswana	Full
Botswana University of Agriculture and Natural Resources	Botswana	Full
Bowen University	Nigeria	Full
Bugema University	Uganda	Full
Bule Hora University	Ethiopia	Full
Busitema University	Uganda	Full
Cairo University	Egypt	Full
Capital University of Somalia	Somalia	Full
Carnegie Mellon University	Rwanda	Full
Catholic University of Mozambique	Mozambique	Full
Catholic University of Zimbabwe	Zimbabwe	Full
Cavendish University	Zambia	Full
Central University	Ghana	Full
Central University of Technology, Free State	South Africa	Full
Chinhoyi University of Technology	Zimbabwe	Full
Chreso University	Zambia	Associate
College of Business Education	Tanzania	Full
Covenant University	Nigeria	Full
Crawford University	Nigeria	Associate
Cuttington University	Liberia	Full
Dalanj University	Sudan	Full
Daystar University	Kenya	Full
Dedan Kimathi University of Technology	Kenya	Full
Delta State University	Nigeria	Full
Dire Dawa University	Ethiopia	Full
DMI St. Eugene University	Zambia	Full
DMI St. John the Baptist University	Malawi	Full
Durban University of Technology	South Africa	Full
East Africa University	Somalia	Full
Ebonyi State University	Nigeria	Full
École de gouvernance et d'économie de Rabat	Morocco	Full
Ecole des Cadres	Togo	Associate
École des Mines, de L'industrie et de la Géologie	Niger	Full
École Nationale Supérieure de Statistique et d'Économie Appliquée	Cote d'Ivoire	Full
École Nationale Supérieure des Travaux Publics	Cameroon	Full
École Normale Supérieure de Bujumbura	Burundi	Full
École normale supérieure de Nouakchott	Mauritania	Full
École Supérieure Polytechnique d'Antsiranana	Madagascar	Associate
Edexcel University	Benin	Full
Edo State University	Nigeria	Full
Egerton University	Kenya	Full
Egypt-Japan University of Science and Technology	Egypt	Associate
Ekiti State University	Nigeria	Full
El Imam El Mahdi University	Sudan	Full
Elizade University	Nigeria	Full
Emir Abdelkader University of Islamic Sciences	Algeria	Full
Enugu State University of Science and Technology	Nigeria	Full
Ernest Bai Koroma University of Science and Technology	Sierra Leone	Full
Ethiopian Public Service University	Ethiopia	Full
Euclid University	Central African Republic	Full
Faculty of Islamic Call	Libya	Associate
Federal Polytechnic Oko	Nigeria	Full
Federal University of Agriculture, Abeokuta	Nigeria	Full
Federal University of Technology, Akure	Nigeria	Full
Federal University of Technology, Minna	Nigeria	Full
Federal University of Technology, Owerri	Nigeria	Full
Federal University Oye-Ekiti	Nigeria	Full
Fountain University	Nigeria	Full
Garden City University College	Ghana	Full
Ghana Communication Technology University	Ghana	Full
Ghana Institute of Languages	Ghana	Full
Ghana Institute of Management and Public Administration	Ghana	Full
Gollis University	Somalia	Full
Gombe State University	Nigeria	Full
Graduate School of Management	Côte d'Ivoire	Associate
Great Zimbabwe University	Zimbabwe	Full
Green Hope University	Somalia	Associate
Groupe Institut Supérieur De Commerce Et D'administration Des Entreprises	Morocco	Full
Haramaya University	Ethiopia	Full
Harare Institute of Technology	Zimbabwe	Full
Hawassa University	Ethiopia	Full
Helwan University	Egypt	Full
Henley Business School, Africa	South Africa	Full
Higher Institute of Science and Technology of Mozambique	Mozambique	Full
Himilo University	Somalia	Full
Ho Technical University	Ghana	Full
Hormuud University	Somalia	Associate
Horseed International University	Somalia	Associate
Hubert Kairuki University	Tanzania	Full
Ibn Tofail University	Morocco	Full
Ibrahim Badamasi Babangida University	Nigeria	Full
Igbinedion University	Nigeria	Full
Imo State University	Nigeria	Full
Institut Africain de Santé Publique	Burkina Faso	Associate
Institut de Formation aux Carrières de Santé	Morocco	Full
Institut des Hautes Etudes de Tunis	Tunisia	Full
Institut International des Sciences et Technologie Sénégal	Senegal	Full
Institut Supérieur d'Informatique et de Gestion	Burkina Faso	Full
Institut universitaire d'Abidjan	Côte d'Ivoire	Full
Institut Universitaire du Golf de Guinee	Cameroon	Full
Instituto Superior Politécnico de Tecnologias e Ciências	Angola	Full
Inter-State School of Veterinary Sciences and Medicine	Senegal	Associate
International Centre of Insect Physiology and Ecology	Kenya	Full
International Open University	Gambia	Full
International University of Africa	Sudan	Full
International University of Grand-Bassam	Côte d'Ivoire	Full
International University of Management	Namibia	Full
Islamic University In Uganda	Uganda	Full
IU International University of Applied Sciences	Germany	Associate
Jamhuriya University of Science and Technology	Somalia	Full
Jazeera University	Somalia	Full
Jimma University	Ethiopia	Full
Jomo Kenyatta University of Agriculture and Technology	Kenya	Full
Joseph Sarwuan Tarka University	Nigeria	Full
Kabale University	Uganda	Full
Kabarak University	Kenya	Full
Kampala International University	Uganda	Full
KCA University	Kenya	Full
Kenyatta University	Kenya	Full
Kesmonds International University	Cameroon	Associate
Kilmanjaro Christian Medical College	Tanzania	Full
Knutsford University College	Ghana	Associate
Koforidua Technical University	Ghana	Full
Kumasi Technical University	Ghana	Full
Kwame Nkrumah University of Science and Technology	Ghana	Full
Kwara State University	Nigeria	Full
Kwararafa University	Nigeria	Associate
Ladoke Akintola University of Technology	Nigeria	Full
Lagos State University of Science and Technology	Nigeria	Full
Landmark University	Nigeria	Associate
Licungo University	Mozambique	Full
Lilongwe University of Agriculture and Natural Resources	Malawi	Full
Lincoln University College	Malaysia	Associate
Lupane State University	Zimbabwe	Full
Lusaka Apex Medical University	Zambia	Full
Maflekumen Higher Institute of Health Sciences	Cameroon	Full
Makerere University	Uganda	Full
Malawi University of Science and Technology	Malawi	Full
Malawi University of Business and Applied Sciences	Malawi	Full
Manicaland State University of Applied Sciences	Zimbabwe	Full
Mansoura University	Egypt	Full
Marodijeh International University	Somalia	Full
Maryam Abacha Université Americane Du Niger	Niger	Full
Maseno University	Kenya	Full
Masinde Muliro College of Science and Technology	Kenya	Full
Matrouh University	Egypt	Full
Mekelle University	Ethiopia	Full
Menoufia University	Egypt	Full
Meru University of Science and Technology	Kenya	Full
Methodist University Ghana	Ghana	Full
Michael Okpara University of Agriculture, Umudike	Nigeria	Full
Midlands State University	Zimbabwe	Full
Minia University	Egypt	Full
Misr University for Science & Technology	Egypt	Full
Misurata University	Libya	Full
Modibbo Adama University, Yola	Nigeria	Full
Mogadishu University	Somalia	Full
Mohammed VI Polytechnic University	Morocco	Full
Moi University	Kenya	Full
Mount Kenya University	Kenya	Full
Mountain Top University	Nigeria	Full
Mountains of the Moon University	Uganda	Full
Muhimbili University of Health & Allied Sciences	Tanzania	Full
Multimedia University of Kenya	Kenya	Full
Mulungushi University	Zambia	Associate
Muslim University of Morogoro	Tanzania	Full
Mzumbe University	Tanzania	Full
Namibia University of Science and Technology	Namibia	Full
Nangui Abrogoua University	Côte d'Ivoire	Full
Nasarawa State University	Nigeria	Full
National Institute of Public Administration	Zambia	Full
National Open University of Nigeria	Nigeria	Full
National University of Lesotho	Lesotho	Full
National University of Science and Technology	Zimbabwe	Full
National University Sudan	Sudan	Full
Ndejje University	Uganda	Full
Nelson Mandela University	South Africa	Full
New Era College	Botswana	Full
Ngaoundéré de University	Cameroon	Full
Niger Delta University	Nigeria	Full
Nile University of Nigeria	Nigeria	Full
Nile Valley University	Sudan	Full
Njala University	Sierra Leone	Full
Nnamdi Azikiwe University	Nigeria	Full
North-west University	South Africa	Full
Obafemi Awolowo University	Nigeria	Full
Obour High Institute	Egypt	Associate
October 6 University	Egypt	Full
Olabisi Onabanjo University	Nigeria	Full
Omar Bongo University	Gabon	Full
Omdurman Ahlia University	Sudan	Full
Omdurman Islamic University	Sudan	Full
Open University of Mauritius	Mauritius	Full
Oromia State University	Ethiopia	Full
Osun State University	Nigeria	Full
Pan African Institute For Development – West Africa	Cameroon	Full
Pan African University	Ethiopia	Full
Pan-Atlantic University	Nigeria	Full
Pedagogical University of Maputo	Mozambique	Full
Pentecost University	Ghana	Full
Pigier Côte d'ivoire	Côte d'Ivoire	Full
Plasma University	Somalia	Full
Poma International Business University	Benin	Full
Presbyterian University College	Ghana	Full
Prince Abubakar Audu University	Nigeria	Full
Puntland State University	Somalia	Associate
Radford University College	Ghana	Associate
Red Sea University	Sudan	Full
Red Sea University, Somalia	Somalia	Full
Redeemer's University	Nigeria	Full
Regent University College of Science and Technology	Ghana	Full
Regional Maritime University	Ghana	Full
Rhodes University	South Africa	Full
Rivers State University	Nigeria	Full
Rusangu University	Zambia	Full
Sebha University	Libya	Full
Sefako Makgatho Health Sciences University	South Africa	Full
Simad University	Somalia	Associate
Sokoine University of Agriculture	Tanzania	Full
Solusi University	Zimbabwe	Full
Somali International University	Somalia	Full
South Eastern Kenya University	Kenya	Associate
South Valley University	Egypt	Full
Southern African Nazarene University	Eswatini	Full
Southshore University College	Ghana	Full
St. Augustine University	Tanzania	Full
St. Mary's University	Ethiopia	Full
Stella Maris Polytechnic University	Liberia	Full
Stellenbosch University	South Africa	Full
Strathmore University	Kenya	Full
Sudan Academy of Sciences	Sudan	Full
Sudan International University	Sudan	Full
Sudan University of Science and Technology	Sudan	Full
Suez Canal University	Egypt	Full
Sule Lamido University	Nigeria	Full
Takoradi Technical University	Ghana	Full
Tamale Technical University	Ghana	Full
Tanta University	Egypt	Full
Texila American University	Zambia	Associate
The American University in Cairo	Egypt	Full
The Arab Academy for Management, Banking and Financial Sciences	Egypt	Full
The British University in Egypt	Egypt	Full
The Catholic University of Eastern Africa	Kenya	Full
The Copperbelt University	Zambia	Full
The Egyptian e-Learning University	Egypt	Full
The Future University	Sudan	Associate
The Independent Institute of Education	South Africa	Full
The Nelson Mandela African Institution of Science and Technology Nm-ast	Tanzania	Full
The Open University of Tanzania	Tanzania	Full
Thomas Adewumi University	Nigeria	Associate
Uganda Christian University	Uganda	Full
Uganda Management Institute	Uganda	Full
Uganda Martyrs University	Uganda	Full
Uganda Technology and Management University	Uganda	Full
Umaru Musa Yar'adua University	Nigeria	Full
Umma University	Kenya	Associate
UNICAF University, Malawi	Malawi	Full
UNICAF University, Zambia	Zambia	Full
United Methodist University	Liberia	Full
Universidade Aberta ISCED	Mozambique	Associate
Universidade Catolica De Mozambique	Mozambique	Full
Universidade Eduardo Mondlane	Mozambique	Full
Universidade Jean Piaget de Cabo Verde	Cabo Verde	Associate
Universidade Joaquim Chissano	Mozambique	Full
Universidade Óscar Ribas	Angola	Full
Université Aube Nouvelle	Burkina Faso	Associate
Université Badji Mokhtar d'Annaba	Algeria	Full
Université d'Oran 1	Algeria	Full
Université de Lome	Togo	Full
Université des Sciences et de la Technologie Houari-Boumediene	Algeria	Full
Université Simon-Kimbangu	Democratic Republic of the Congo	Full
Université Tertiaire et Technologique Loko	Côte d'Ivoire	Full
Université de Kisangani	Democratic Republic of the Congo	Full
University André Salifou	Niger	Full
University for Development Studies	Ghana	Full
University Frères Mentouri Constantine 1	Algeria	Full
University of Abuja	Nigeria	Full
University of Antananarivo	Madagascar	Full
University of Asmara	Eritrea	Full
University of Bahr El-Ghazal	South Sudan	Full
University of Bahri	Sudan	Full
University of Bakht Er Ruda	Sudan	Full
University of Bamenda	Cameroon	Full
University of Benghazi	Libya	Full
University of Benin	Nigeria	Full
University of Botswana	Botswana	Full
University of Buea	Cameroon	Full
University of Calabar	Nigeria	Full
University of Cape Coast	Ghana	Full
University of Cape Town	South Africa	Full
University of Cross River State	Nigeria	Full
University of Dar es Salaam	Tanzania	Full
University of Dodoma	Tanzania	Full
University of Education, Winneba	Ghana	Full
University of Eldoret	Kenya	Full
University of Energy and Natural Resources	Ghana	Full
University of Eswatini	Eswatini	Full
University of Fort Hare	South Africa	Full
University of Gezira	Sudan	Full
University of Ghana	Ghana	Full
University of Global Health Equity	Rwanda	Full
University of Hargeisa	Somalia	Full
University of Health and Allied Sciences	Ghana	Full
University of Ibadan	Nigeria	Full
University of Ilorin	Nigeria	Full
University of Iringa	Tanzania	Full
University of Johannesburg	South Africa	Full
University of Jos	Nigeria	Full
University of Juba	South Sudan	Full
University of Kabridahar	Ethiopia	Associate
University of Kara	Togo	Full
University of Khartoum	Sudan	Full
University of Kordofan	Sudan	Full
University of KwaZulu-Natal	South Africa	Full
University of Lagos	Nigeria	Full
University of Liberia	Liberia	Full
University of Lusaka	Zambia	Full
University of Maiduguri	Nigeria	Full
University of Malawi	Malawi	Full
University of Mauritius	Mauritius	Full
University of Media, Arts and Communication	Ghana	Full
University of Mines and Technology	Ghana	Full
University of N'Djamena	Chad	Full
University of Nairobi	Kenya	Full
University of Namibia	Namibia	Full
University of Nigeria	Nigeria	Full
University of Nouakchott Al Aasriya	Mauritania	Full
University of Nyala	Sudan	Full
University of Oum El Bouaghi	Algeria	Full
University of Port Harcourt	Nigeria	Full
University of Pretoria	South Africa	Full
University of Professional Studies	Ghana	Full
University of Rwanda	Rwanda	Full
University of Sadat City	Egypt	Full
University of Science and Technology	Sudan	Full
University of Science and Technology of Oran Mohamed-Boudiaf	Algeria	Full
University of Science, Techniques and Technologies of Bamako	Mali	Full
University of Sierra Leone	Sierra Leone	Full
University of Sinnar	Sudan	Full
University of Somalia	Somalia	Full
University of South Africa	South Africa	Full
University of Technology, Mauritius	Mauritius	Full
University of the Free State	South Africa	Full
University of the Gambia	Gambia	Full
University of the Holy Qur'an and Taseel of Science	Sudan	Full
University of the Western Cape	South Africa	Full
University of Tlemcen	Algeria	Full
University of Tripoli	Libya	Full
University of Uyo	Nigeria	Full
University of Venda	South Africa	Full
University of Western Kordufan	Sudan	Full
University of Witwatersrand	South Africa	Full
University of Zalingei	Sudan	Full
University of Zambia	Zambia	Full
University of Zawia	Libya	Full
Central Christian University	Malawi	Full
University of Zimbabwe	Zimbabwe	Full
University of Zintan	Libya	Full
Université Africaine de Développement Coopératif	Benin	Full
Université Al Quaraouyine	Morocco	Full
Université catholique du Congo	Republic of the Congo	Full
Université Centrale	Tunisia	Full
Université Cheikh Anta Diop	Senegal	Full
Université d'Abomey-Calavi	Benin	Full
Université d'Alger 1	Algeria	Full
Université de Bangui	Central African Republic	Full
Université de Carthage	Tunisia	Full
Université de Douala	Cameroon	Full
Université de Dschang	Cameroon	Full
Université de Fianarantsoa	Madagascar	Full
Université de Kinshasa	Democratic Republic of the Congo	Full
Université de Lubumbashi	Democratic Republic of the Congo	Full
Université de Maroua	Cameroon	Full
Université de Parakou	Benin	Full
Université de Toamasina	Madagascar	Full
Université de Yaoundé I	Cameroon	Full
Université des sciences et techniques de Masuku	Gabon	Full
Université du Burundi	Burundi	Full
Université Félix Houphouët-Boigny	Côte d'Ivoire	Full
Université Gaston Berger	Senegal	Full
Université Hassan 1^{er}	Morocco	Full
Université Islamique du Congo	Democratic Republic of the Congo	Associate
Université Joseph Ki-Zerbo	Burkina Faso	Full
Université Kasdi Merbah Ouargla	Algeria	Full
Université Loyola du Congo	Republic of the Congo	Associate
Université Marien Ngouabi	Republic of the Congo	Full
Université Mohammed I	Morocco	Full
Université Mohammed V	Morocco	Full
Université Nazi Boni	Burkina Faso	Full
Université Nord Madagascar	Madagascar	Full
Université Péléforo-Gbon-Coulibaly	Côte d'Ivoire	Full
Upper Nile University	South Sudan	Full
Usmanu Danfodiyo University	Nigeria	Full
Valley View University	Ghana	Full
Wad Medani Ahlia College	Sudan	Full
Walter Sisulu University	South Africa	Full
William V. S. Tubman University	Liberia	Full
Wisconsin International University College	Ghana	Full
Wollega University	Ethiopia	Full
Women's University in Africa	Zimbabwe	Full
Zagazig University	Egypt	Full
Zambeze University	Mozambique	Full
Zambia Forestry College	Zambia	Associate
Zambian Open University	Zambia	Full
Zamzam University of Science and Technology	Somalia	Full
Zanzibar University	Tanzania	Full
Zenith University College	Ghana	Full
Zimbabwe Council for Higher Education	Zimbabwe	Associate
Zimbabwe Open University	Zimbabwe	Full

== See also ==
- List of higher education associations and alliances
- Universities in Africa
