= List of universities in Somalia =

This is a list of universities in Somalia, as well as the partially recognised state and dejure state of Somaliland.

== Mogadishu ==
- Baresan University, Mogadishu
- Benadir University, Mogadishu
- Hiiraan, Garoowe and Afgooye
- Indian Ocean University (IOU), Mogadishu
- Jamhuriya University of Science and Technology (JUST), Mogadishu
- Jazeera University (JU), Mogadishu
- Jobkey University (JU), Mogadishu
- Mogadishu University, Mogadishu
- SIMAD University, Mogadishu
- Somali International University, Mogadishu
- Somali National University, Mogadishu, Abudwaq and Badhan.
- University of Somalia (UNISO), Mogadishu
- Zamzam University of Science and Technology, Mogadishu
- Al-Imra International University (AIU), Mogadishu
- Abrar University, Mogadushu
- Adal Medical University,Borame
- Afro-Asian University
- Almaas University (AU), Mogadushu
- An-Nour University, Mogadishu
- Daaru Salaam University, Mogadishu
- Global University, Mogadishu
- Golden university
- Green Hope University (G H U), Mogadishi, Baladweyn, Garowe, Qardho,
- Hano Technical University, Mogadishu [Hano Technical University]
- Hansan Medical College, Mogadishu
- Hope university, (HU)
- Hormuud University, Mogadishu
- Imam University, Mogadishu(IU)
- Metropolitan University of somalia, Mogadishu
- Mogadishu Polytechnic University, Mogadishu
- Nile University of Science and Technology (NUST), Mogadishu, Beledweyne, Gedo,
- Plasma university, Mogadishu, Baladweyn, Kisamaayo, Duusamareeb, Baydhabo,
- Qudus university, Mogadishu,

== Badhan ==
Badhan is a city in Sanaag administered by Somaliland and Puntland.

- Iqra Institute for Higher Education
- Maakhir University

== Baidoa ==
- Upper Jubba University
- Green Somalia University, Baidoa

== Bari ==
- CITYCOT University, Bosaso
- East Africa University, Bosaso and Qardho
- Mogadishu University (Puntland branch), Bosaso
- Red Sea University (RSU) Bosaaso
- Sahal University, Bosaso
- University of Health Sciences (UOHS), Bosaso

== Berbera ==
Berbera is a city in Sahil administered by Somaliland.

- Berbera Marine University

== Burao ==
Burao is a city in Togdheer administered by Somaliland

- Burao University

== Erigavo ==
Erigavo is a city in Sanaag administered by Somaliland.

- Sanaag University of Science and Technology

== Gedo ==
- Bardera Polytechnic, Bardera
- University of Gedo, Bardera
- Bismo Professional College (Luuq)
- Bismo University (Luuq)
- Gedo International University (Balad-hawo).
- Nile University of Science and Technology, Garbaharey

== Lower Juba ==
- Kismayo University
- Jubba University of Somalia

== Nugal ==
- Admas University College, Garowe
- East Africa University, Garowe
- Puntland State University, Garowe
- Bosaso University (Garowe branch), Garowe
- Frontier University, Garowe
- Green Hope University (G H U),
- University of Northeastern (U N S) Garowe

== Mudug ==
- East Africa University, Galkayo and Galdogob
- Puntland State University, Galkayo
- Global Science University, Galkaio

== Hargeisa ==
Hargeisa is capital of the Republic of Somaliland.

- Admas University College–Hargeisa
- Gollis University
- Hope University
- Somaliland University of Technology
- University of Hargeisa
- Abaarso Tech University
- Addisababa Medical University
- Alpha University
- Edna University Hospital
- Frantz Fanon University
- International Horn University
- New Generation University
- Osman Guelleh Farah University (OGFU)
- The Unity University

== Hiiraan ==
- Central University of Science and Technology
- Jobkey University
- Beledweyne University
- Green Hope University
- Hiiraan University
- Nile University of Science and Technology
- Plasma University

== See also ==
- List of universities and colleges in Somaliland
