= Education in Somalia =

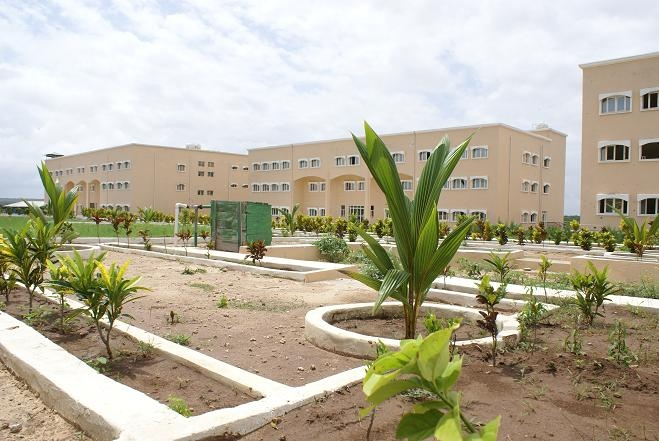
Mogadishu University campus.

Education in Somalia refers to the academic system within Somalia. The Ministry of Education is officially responsible for education in Somalia, with about 15% of the nation's budget allocated to scholastic instruction. The breakaway republic of Somaliland maintains its own advanced Ministry of Education.

== History ==
=== Civilian Era 1960-1969 ===
During the civilian government of Somalia (1960–1969), education received limited attention, resulting in Somalia's education system having the lowest standard in Africa. In 1968, a UNESCO inspection mission examined the education system in northern Somalia (the former British Somaliland). The mission reported that numerous schools suffered from poor cleanliness and inadequate maintenance, creating an uncomfortable environment for teachers and students.

In most cases, the general effect of the lack of maintenance is enhanced by a similar lack of cleanliness. Whether because there are not enough sweepers, or because they do not work properly, or because the responsible managers just do not care, the fact is that, in too many places, education takes place amid a general dirtiness.

=== Barre Era post 1969 ===
The Barre government initiated large-scale literacy programs in 1972, and successfully implemented an urban and rural literacy campaign, thus significantly increasing the literacy rate. By the end of the program, literacy rate in Somalia was estimated at 80%. In 1975 the Somali Ministry of education was awarded a UNESCO prize. According to a World Bank education survey on Somalia conducted in the 1970s, the expansion of education during this period was described as outstanding.

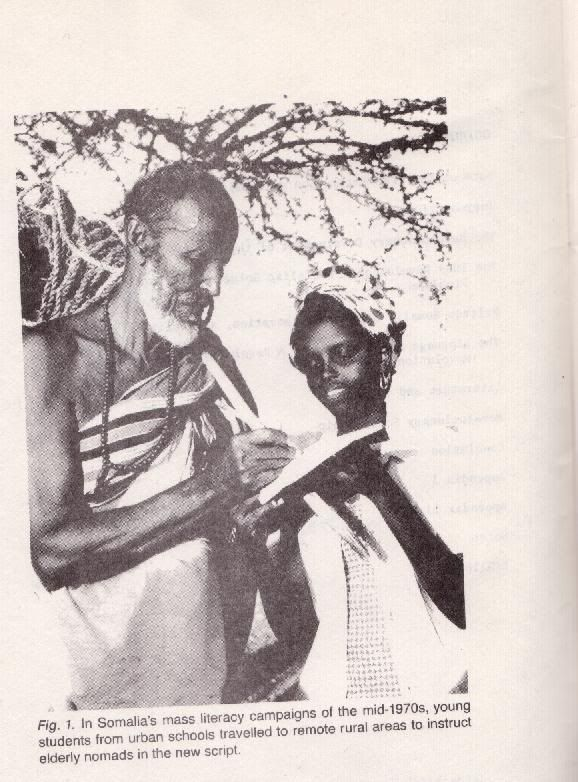
Rural Somali literacy program

Former US ambassador to Somalia praised Somali literacy efforts:

UNESCO reportedly examined this and found that when Somalis closed down the schools for two years and sent everybody to the field with chalk and blackboards and radio receivers, that they did, in a period of five years, go from a 12-16% literacy rate to an 86% literacy rate. The Somalis that I know, having been back four times since retirement, and having the privilege of traveling anywhere in the country, would say it certainly is well over 50%. Exactly how high it is, I have no way of judging. But I think it is one of the most remarkable achievements of any country in Africa.

UNESCO assessments at the time indicated that Ethiopia’s literacy efforts were less impressive than those in Somalia; the literacy rate in Ethiopia was recorded at a low of 3.5%. Following 1974, Kiflu Tadesse writes that Ethiopia copied literacy campaigns and related state-building measures of Siad Barre in Somalia.

== Overview ==
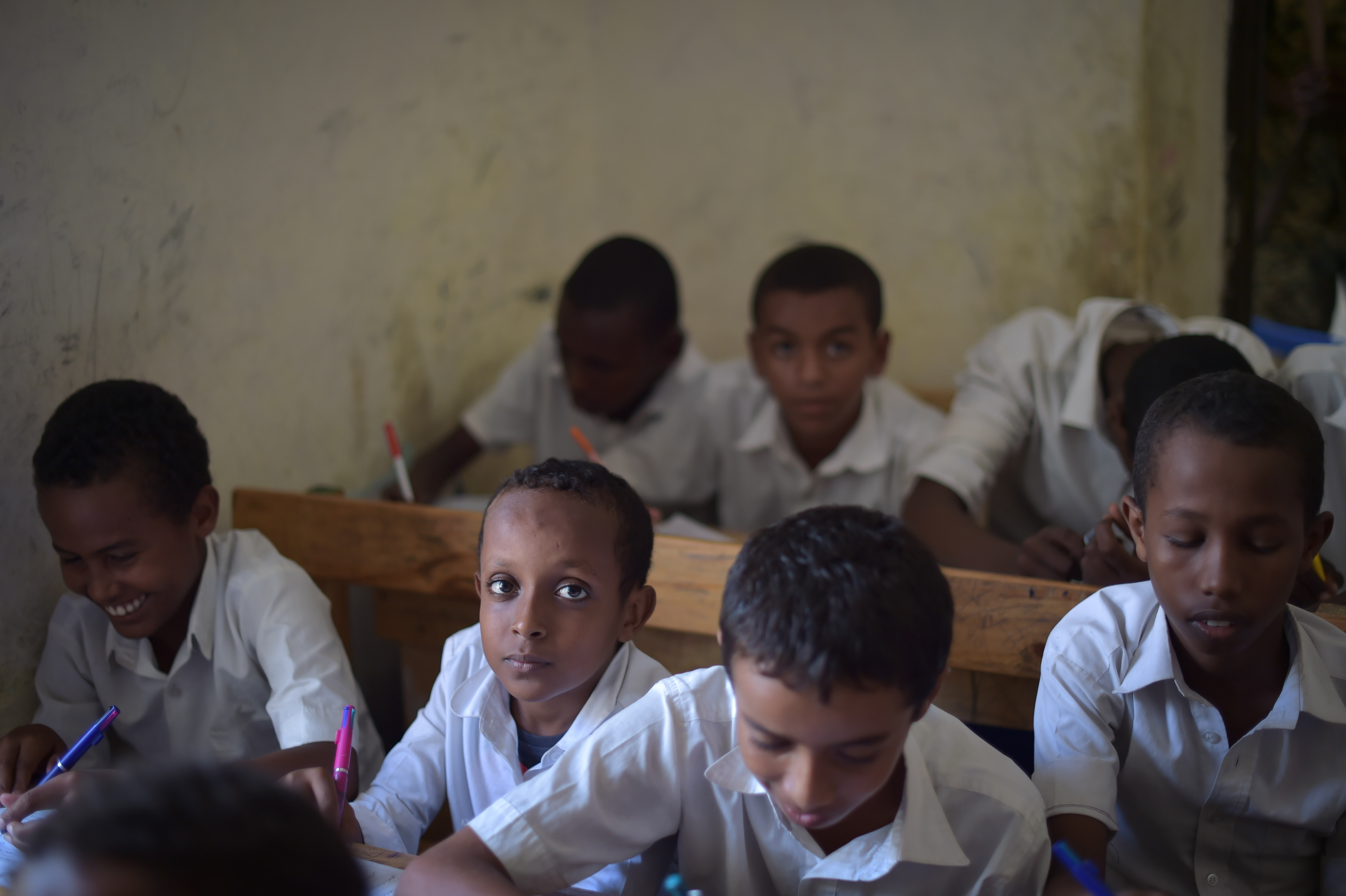
Children during a lesson at school in Barawe, Somalia.

The school system in the colonial era before WW2 was limited mainly to primary schools (like the "Scuola Regina Elena"), but in the capital Mogadishu of "Italian Somalia" there was an important high school. In this Lyceum was created in the early 1950s the "National Institute of Legal, Economic and Social Studies", as a post-secondary school in Italian language for pre-university studies in order to access the Italian universities.

The Somali National University was the first high level education institution in the territory of Somalia. It was established in 1954 as L'Universita' Nazionale Somala during the Trust Territory of Somaliland. In 1969, the institution obtained official university status in newly independent Somalia. The main university grounds were situated about six kilometers from the city center of Mogadishu. Here, during the institution's first thirty years, the main campus was known as Jaamacada Gaheyr ("Gaheyr University").

Following the outbreak of the Somali Civil War in 1991, the task of running schools in Somalia was initially taken up by community education committees established in 94% of the local schools. Numerous problems had arisen with regard to access to education in rural areas and along gender lines, quality of educational provisions, responsiveness of school curricula, educational standards and controls, management and planning capacity, and financing. To address these concerns, the Puntland government is in the process of developing an educational policy to guide the region's scholastic process as it embarks on the path of reconstruction and economic development. The latter includes a gender sensitive national education policy compliant with world standards, such as those outlined in the Convention on the Rights of the Child (CRC) and the Convention on the Elimination of All Forms of Discrimination against Women (CEDAW). Examples of this and other educational measures at work are the government's enactment of legislation aimed at securing the educational interests of girls, promoting the growth of an Early Childhood Development (ECD) program designed to reach parents and care-givers in their homes as well as in the ECD centers for 0-5-year-old children, and introducing incentive packages to encourage teachers to work in remote rural areas.

In 1992 Tadamun was established a nongovernmental, non-profit, and non-political organization based in Bosaso as the organization is registered in Puntland and closely collaborates with line ministries to provide inclusive services to communities.

== Educational structure ==
Within the Puntland government, the Ministry of Education is responsible for developing and managing the region's educational needs. It is headed by the Minister Abdullahi Mohamed Hassan, under whom a Vice Minister and Director General help oversee a Post-Primary Education Division (PPED) and a Basic Education Directorate (BED), among other boards.

The educational system of Puntland comprises two years of Early Childhood Development (ECD), eight years of primary education (four years of lower primary and four years of upper primary) and four years of secondary education. University education comprises an average of four years. Thus, it is a 2-4-4-4 system. Puntland's Ministry of Education also recognizes non-formal and technical and vocational education as integral parts of the region's educational system.

=== Early Childhood Development (ECD) ===
Early Childhood Development (ECD), as with primary education and non-formal education programs, falls within the category of basic education and entails the essential skills of literacy and numeracy upon which further learning is built. Qur'anic education also forms a component of ECD. ECD is offered to children in the 0-5 age bracket, with the focus on stimulating and developing the cognitive, affective and psycho-motor skills of the toddler and his/her holistic development. It also prepares children for school and facilitates the transition from home to primary school.

=== Primary education ===
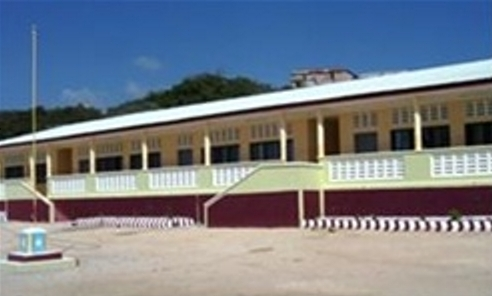
The Hammar Jab Jab School in Mogadishu.

Primary education features nine compulsory subjects: Arabic, Islamic studies, Somali, mathematics (including business education), science (health, environmental education, and agriculture), social studies (including history, geography and civics), English, physical education and arts and crafts. Lower and upper primary students are taught for 36 and 42 lesson periods, each lasting 35 and 40 minutes, respectively, per week. The language of instruction is Somali in subjects other than Arabic and Islam; English is taught as a subject from Grades 2 to 8.

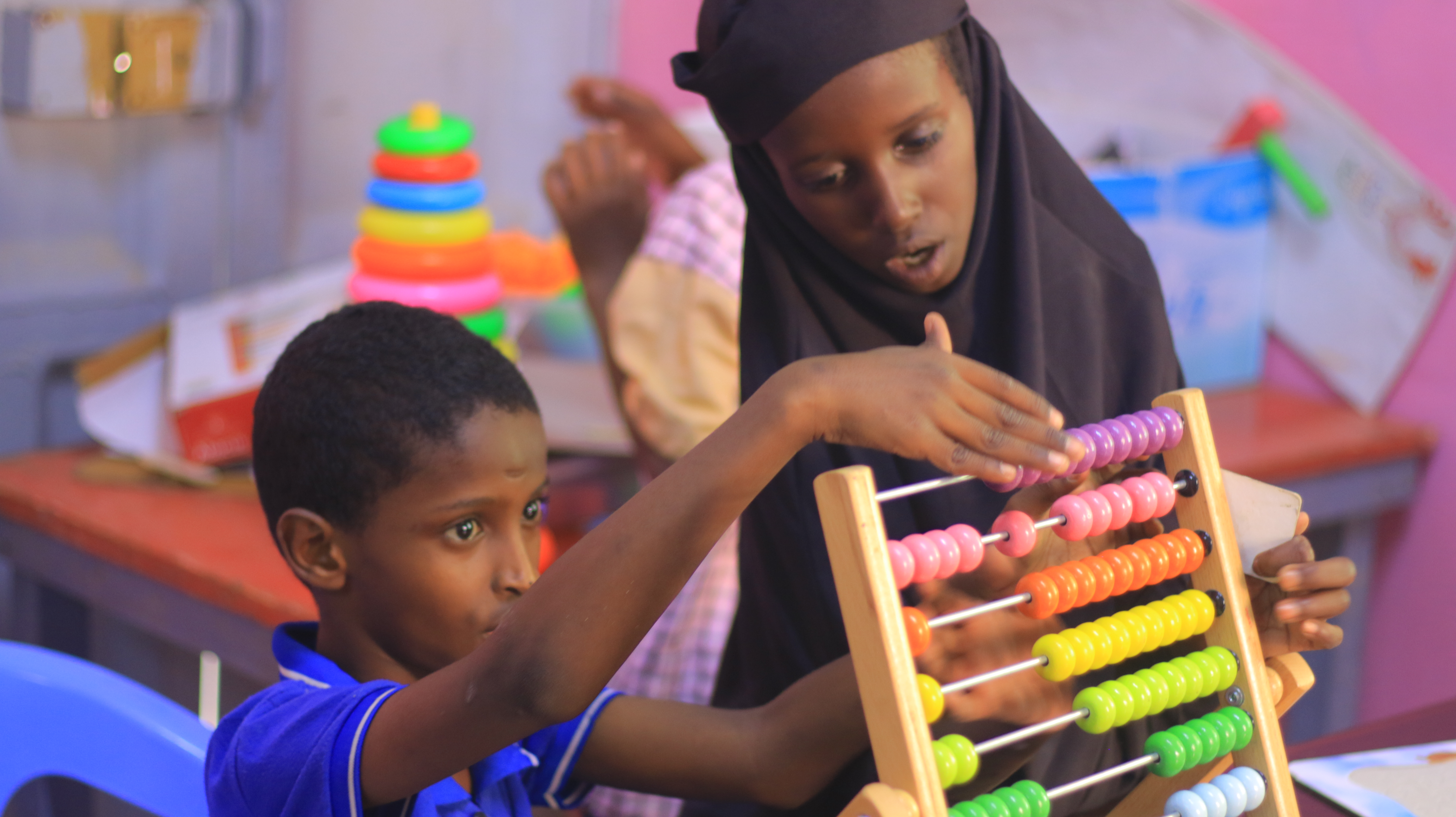
The Autism Somalia Center in Garowe provides specialized care and education for children with special educational needs.

Special education programs for students with disabilities are available in some places.

=== Secondary education ===
Secondary school education is offered for four years to pupils between the ages of 15–18, and leads to a Puntland Secondary School Certificate Examination (PSCE). Ten subjects are taught in secondary schools, namely: mathematics, physics, chemistry, biology, Somali, Arabic, Islamic studies, English, physical education, geography and history. All subjects, with the exception of physical education, are compulsory. English is the language of instruction in secondary schools, except in the Somali, Arabic, and Islamic courses. Each school week is composed of 40 periods of 45 minutes each.

=== Tertiary education ===
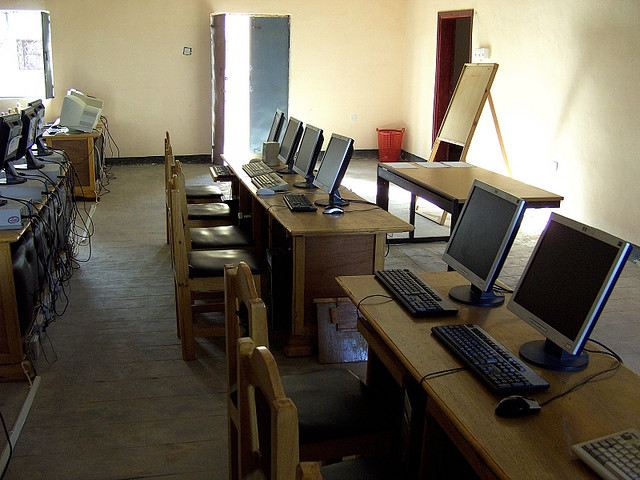
A computer classroom in Puntland State University.

Tertiary education in Somalia refers to education offered on completion of secondary education. Teacher education, for convenience, is grouped under this category. Tertiary education in the context of Puntland thus includes university education, instruction offered through diploma–level institutions such as community and teacher colleges. The Puntland region currently counts five major universities: Puntland State University in Garowe, Puntland State University in Galkayo, Bosaso College in Bosaso, Mogadishu University Puntland Branch in Bosaso, and East Africa University in Bosaso, Galkayo and Garowe.

In the northwestern Somaliland region, tertiary academic instruction is provided by the University of Hargeisa, Admas University College, International Horn University and Somaliland University of Technology in Hargeisa, and Burao University in Burao.

In the Sanaag region, Maakhir University in Badhan offers undergraduate courses. Nugaal University in Las Anod also provides tertiary instruction to residents of Sool. In the Awdal province, Amoud University in Borama serves the local community. The East Africa University-Buuhoodle has been in operation since 2012 and gives undergraduate degree of four major faculties.

Universities offering higher education in southern Somalia include Indian Ocean University, Mogadishu University, Benadir University, Zamzam University of Science and Technology, the Somalia National University, SIMAD University, the University of Southern Somalia, Kismayo University, the University of Somalia and the University of Gedo. The Gedo region is also home to Bardera Polytechnic, the region's first polytechnic school.

=== Technical/Vocational education and training (TVET) ===
Technical/Vocational education and training (TVET) is offered at both the post-primary and post-secondary levels. The objectives of technical/vocational instruction and training at both the post-primary and post-secondary levels are to provide training opportunities for school drop outs to enable them to be productive citizens and self-supporting, to provide technical/vocational education and training that is relevant to the industrial, commercial and economic needs of Puntland, and to reduce disparities through increased training opportunities for the handicapped and learners from disadvantaged communities, as well as women.

=== Non-formal education (NFE) ===
The last tier of academic instruction offered in Somalia is non-formal education (NFE), which refers to a broad set of learning opportunities that are offered to out-of-school children, youth and adults. These include vocational skills training, adult literacy, community health education, and agricultural extension activities.

=== Religious education ===
Qur'anic schools (also known as duqsi) remain the basic system of traditional religious instruction in Somalia. They provide Islamic education for children, thereby filling a clear religious and social role in the country. Known as the most stable local, non-formal system of education providing basic religious and moral instruction, their strength rests on community support and their use of locally made and widely available teaching materials. The Qur'anic system, which teaches the greatest number of students relative to other educational sub-sectors, is often the only system accessible to Somalis in nomadic as compared to urban areas. A study from 1993 found, among other things, that about 40% of pupils in Qur'anic schools were girls. To address shortcomings in religious instruction, the Somali government on its own part also subsequently established the Ministry of Endowment and Islamic Affairs, under which Qur'anic education is now regulated.

== Performance ==
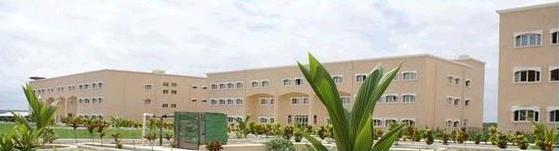
New Mogadishu University campus.

In 2006, the autonomous Puntland region in the northeast was the second territory in Somalia after the Somaliland region to introduce free primary schools, with teachers now receiving their salaries from the Puntland administration.

From 2005/2006 to 2006/2007, there was also a significant increase in the number of schools in Puntland, up 137 institutions from just one year prior. During the same period, the number of classes in the region increased by 504, with 762 more teachers also offering their services. Total student enrollment increased by 27% over the previous year, with girls lagging only slightly behind boys in attendance in most regions. The highest class enrollment was observed in the northernmost Bari region, and the lowest was observed in the under-populated Ayn region. The distribution of classrooms was almost evenly split between urban and rural areas, with marginally more pupils attending and instructors teaching classes in urban areas.

Higher education in Somalia is now largely private. Several universities in the country, including Mogadishu University, have been scored among the 100 best universities in Africa, which has been hailed as a triumph for grass-roots initiatives. The table below shows the level of education completed by surveyed residents of Puntland and Somaliland in 2013.

Level of Education	Puntland	Somaliland	Urban	Rural	Total
Illiterate	28%	13%	35%	51%	42%
Madrasssa/Koranic school	36%	41%	24%	29%	26%
Primary school completed	22%	30%	21%	15%	18%
Vocational school	4%	1%	4%	1%	3%
Secondary school completion	7%	12%	11%	4%	8%
Tertiary education or higher	2%	7%	5%	0%	3%

== See also ==
- List of universities in Somalia
- List of universities in Africa
- List of Arab universities
- Literacy in Somalia
- Traditional education in Somalia
