= Admas University College =

Admas University College may refer to:

- Admas University College–Addis Ababa, university in Addis Ababa, Ethiopia
- Admas University College–Hargeisa, branch of Admas University College founded in Somaliland, Somalia
- Admas University College–Garowe, branch of Admas University College founded in Puntland, Somalia
