= Education in Puntland =

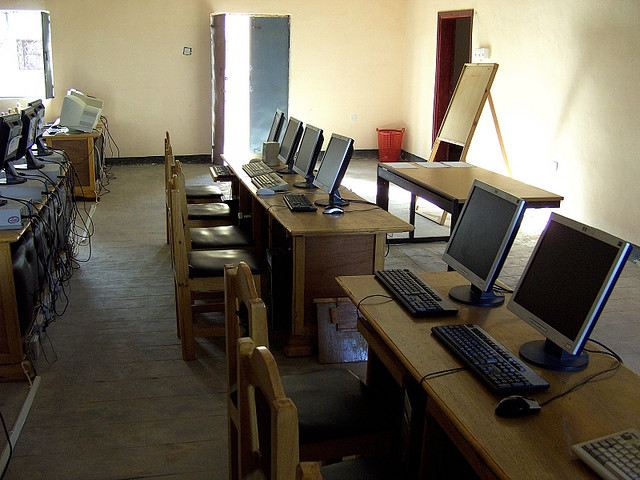
A computer classroom in Puntland State University

Education in Puntland refers to the academic system within Puntland, Somalia. The Ministry of Education and Higher Education is officially responsible for education in Puntland, with about 15% of the government's budget allocated to scholastic instruction.

== Overview ==
Following the outbreak of the civil war in Somalia, numerous problems arose with regard to access to education in rural areas and along gender lines, quality of educational provisions, responsiveness of school curricula, educational standards and controls, management and planning capacity, and financing. To address these concerns, the Puntland government is in the process of developing an educational policy to guide the region's scholastic process as it embarks on the path of reconstruction and economic development. The latter includes a gender sensitive national education policy compliant with world standards, such as those outlined in the Convention on the Rights of the Child (CRC) and the Convention on the Elimination of All Forms of Discrimination against Women (CEDAW). Examples of this and other educational measures at work are the government's enactment of legislation aimed at securing the educational interests of girls, promoting the growth of an Early Childhood Development (ECD) program designed to reach parents and care-givers in their homes as well as in the ECD centers for 0- to 5-year-old children, and introducing incentive packages to encourage teachers to work in remote rural areas. Puntland's education system is considered the most progressive, and is attempting to close the gender gap so that more females will be able to attend school. Other regions are following Puntland's lead in that regard.

Within the Puntland government, the Ministry of Education is responsible for developing and managing the region's educational needs. It is headed by the Minister Mohamud Bile Dubbe, under whom a Vice Minister and Director General help oversee a Post-Primary Education Division (PPED) and a Basic Education Directorate (BED), among other boards.

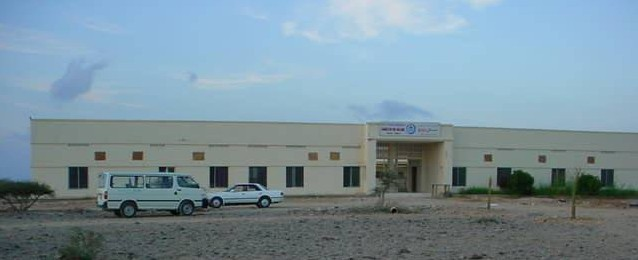
Entrance to East Africa University's Bosaso campus

The educational system of Puntland comprises two years of Early Childhood Development (ECD), eight years of primary education (four years of lower primary and four years of upper primary) and four years of secondary education. Tertiary education comprises an average of four years, with the region currently counting seven major universities: Puntland State University in Garowe, Puntland State University in Galkayo, Bosaso College in Bosaso, East Somalia University in Qardho, Mogadishu University (Puntland branch) in Bosaso, Maakhir University in Badhan, Sanaag, and Nugaal University in Las Anod. East Africa University also has six branches in Puntland, with campuses in Bosaso, Erigavo, Galdogob, Galkayo, Garowe and Qardho. Thus, it is a 2-4-4-4 system. Puntland's Ministry of Education also recognizes non-formal education (NFE) and technical/vocational education and training (TVET) as integral parts of the region's educational system.

From 2005/2006 to 2006/2007, there was a significant increase in the number of schools in Puntland, up 137 institutions from just one year prior. During the same period, the number of classes in the region increased by 504, with 762 more teachers also offering their services. Total student enrollment increased by 27% over the previous year, with girls lagging only slightly behind boys in attendance in most regions. The highest class enrollment was observed in the northernmost Bari region, and the lowest was observed in the under-populated Ayn region. The distribution of classrooms was almost evenly split between urban and rural areas, with marginally more pupils attending and instructors teaching classes in urban areas.

Following the COVID-19 crisis, the Government of Puntland launched the Learning Passport, a digital remote learning platform where children can access educational content both online and offline from their homes. The Learning Passport is a ground-breaking partnership between UNICEF, Microsoft and the University of Cambridge.
