= Tadamon =

Tadamon or with the definite article al-Tadamon (Arabic: التضامن) is an Arabic word meaning solidarity. It may refer to:

== Sports clubs ==
- Tadamon SC, a Syrian football club based in Latakia
- Al-Tadamon SC, a Kuwaiti professional football club based in Al Farwaniya
- Tadamon SC Beirut, a Lebanese football club based in Beirut
- Tadamon SC Sour, a Lebanese football club based in Tyre
- Tadamon Zouk, a Lebanese sports club based in Zouk, Keserwan District

== Other uses ==
- Tadamon, Syria, a neighborhood and district of the al-Midan municipality of Damascus, Syria
- Hizb Al-Tadamon Al-Lubnany, the Solidarity Party of Lebanon
- Al-Tadamon in Sudan

== See also ==
- Tadamun, a Somalia-based NGO
