= AIET =

AIET can refer to:

- Autologous Immune Enhancement Therapy
- Alexandria Higher Institute of Engineering and Technology
