= Youcef Chorfa =

Algerian politician (born 1954)

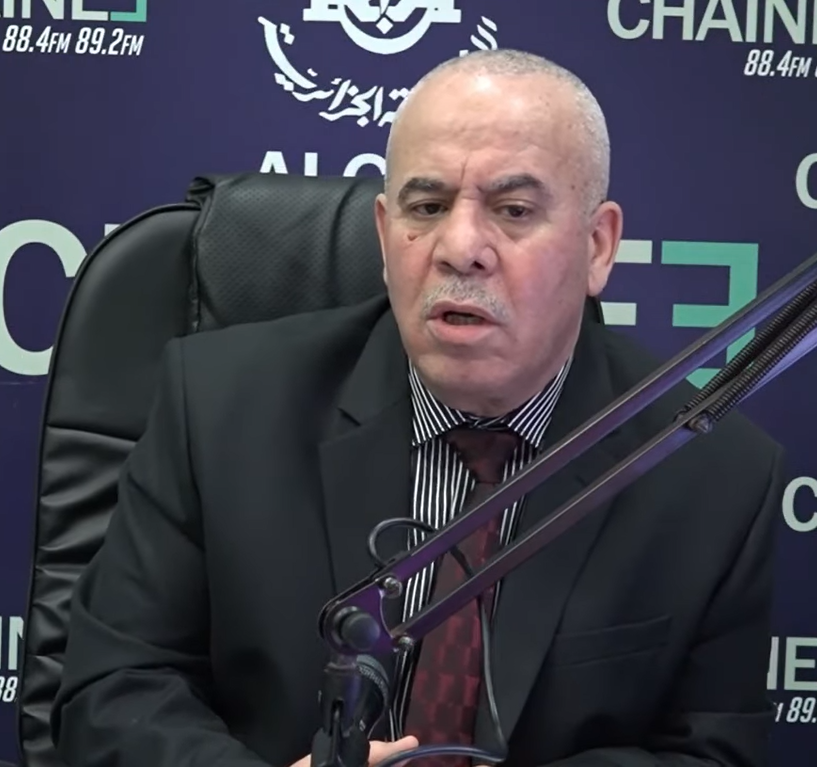
- Youcef Chorfa

Minister of Transport
- In office 16 March 2023 – 29 November 2023
- President: Abdelmadjid Tebboune
- Prime Minister: Aymen Benabderrahmane; Nadir Larbaoui
- Preceded by: Kamel Beldjoud
- Succeeded by: Mohamed El Habib Zahana

Minister of Labor, Employment and Social Security
- In office 11 November 2021 – 16 March 2023
- President: Abdelmadjid Tebboune
- Prime Minister: Aymen Benabderrahmane; Nadir Larbaoui

Personal details
- Born: December 21, 1954 (age 71)
- Education: Institut des Techniques de Planification et de l’Économie Appliquée (GDip)

Youcef Chorfa (born 21 December 1954) was the Algerian Minister of Transport. He held the office from 16 March 2023 to 29 November 2023. Previously, he had served as Minister of Labor, Employment and Social Security from 11 November 2021 until 16 March 2023.

== Education ==
Chorfa holds a Diploma in Planning Engineering from the Institut des Techniques de Planification et de l’Économie Appliquée (1979).

== Career ==
From 1984 until 1996, Chorfa was the Director of Planning and Regional Development in Batna and from 1996 until 2001 in Guelma. In 2001 Chorfa was appointed Secretary General of Batna and in 2005 Secretary General of Souk-Ahras.

Between 2010 and 2021, he was the Wali of Laghouat, Annaba, Blida and Algiers. Additionally, he was the Minister of Housing, Urban Planning and Urban Affairs in 2017.

In 2021, Chorfa was appointed Minister of Labor, Employment and Social Security.

Since 16 March 2023, Chorfa has been Minister of Transport.
