= Nasra Ali Abukar =

Somali track athlete

- Nasra Abuukar Cali
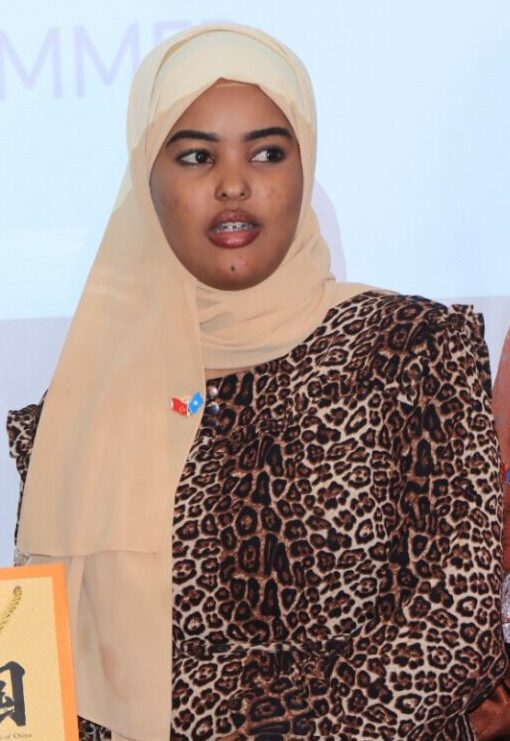
- Abukar in 2023
- Born: September 15, 2004 (age 21); Mogadishu, Somalia
- Education: Jobkey University
- Occupation: Athlete
- Known for: Poor result at the XXXI FISU World University Games (2023)
- Relatives: Khadija Aden Dahir Somali Athletics Federation (chairwoman)
- Sports career
- Country: Somalia
- Event: 100 metres

Nasra Ali Abukar (Somali: Nasra Abuukar Cali; born September 15, 2004) is a Somali university student known for her participation in the 100-meter race at the XXXI FISU World University Games in Chengdu, China, in 2023, where she came last. Her remarkably poor result and perceived lack of athleticism caused international outrage and accusations of nepotism when she was found out to have family ties with the chair of the Somali Athletics Committee.

== XXXI FISU World University Games ==
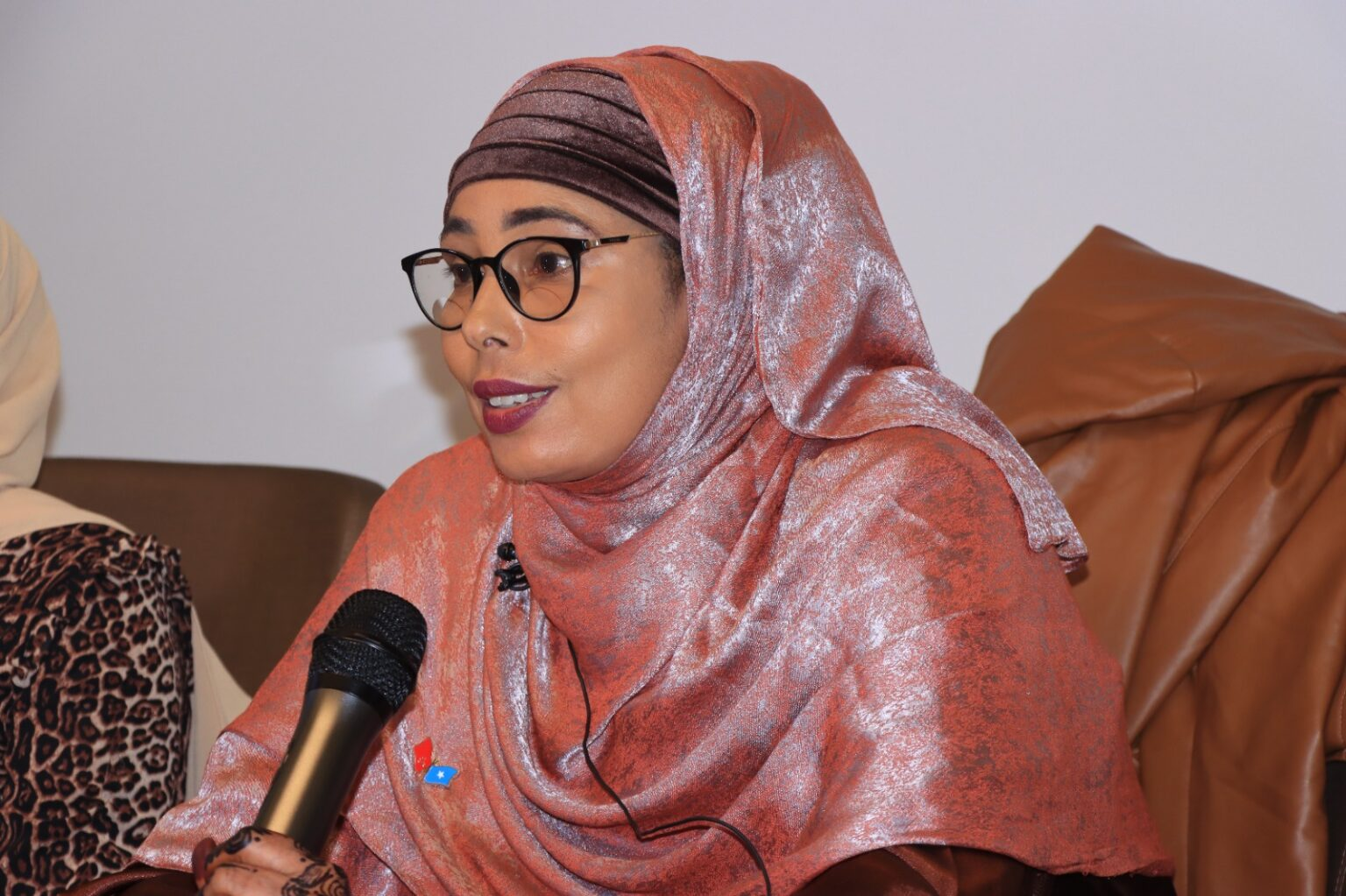
Asha Aden Dahir, Deputy Head of Delegation and Doctor from Banadir Hospital

Ali Abukar's mother is Deka Aden Dahir, whose sister Asha Aden Dahir held the position of deputy head of delegation for Somalia at the XXXI FISU World University Games and is also a doctor at Banadir Hospital, while her other sister Khadija Aden Dahir chaired the Somali Athletics Federation.

On July 26, 2023, during a press release, Ali Abukar stated, "Today, I am very happy to represent Somalia as a runner for the 100 meters [sic]", before heading to the games.

In the video of the race, Ali Abukar can be seen lagging behind the rest of the field as the athletes sprint to the finishing line. She ultimately finished the distance in 21.81 seconds, approximately 10 seconds behind the leader's 11.4.

It has been noted that the qualifying standard for the U.S. women's Olympic 100 m team is 11.15 seconds, and the slowest recorded time in the women's 100 m at the 2020 Olympics was 15.26 seconds, which is more than six seconds faster than Ali Abukar's time. Some international media sources have claimed that her finish time set a "record for the slowest finish" in the history of women's 100 m. However, due to the lack of historical data, it is not possible to determine whether this is true.

In the scoring system of World Athletics, the international governing body for track and field, points are awarded based on performance, with a maximum of 1,400 points for women who finish the 100 m in 10.12 seconds or less. Ali Abukar's time of 21.81 seconds, though slower than the qualifying standard, would still award just 1 point.

=== Reactions ===
The video of Ali Abukar's performance garnered significant attention and went viral, surpassing 19.8 million views on Twitter. The video's popularity sparked questions and criticism, as many wondered why an athlete without prior racing experience and apparent lack of preparation was selected by the Ministry of Youth and Sport to represent Somalia.

Long-distance runners of Somali descent Mo Farah and Abdi Nageeye expressed outrage and shame at the Ministry of Sports and the Somali Olympic Committee over the selection of an untrained athlete instead of a qualified runner.

Questions were raised on social media about the validity of her inclusion in the team, which was claimed to be linked to Ali Abukar being the niece of Somali Athletics Federation President Abdullahi Ahmed Tarabi and of Khadija Adan Dahir, chair of the athletics committee. This led to allegations of nepotism and financial irregularities, with screenshots being presented indicating that Adan Dahir had congratulated her on joining the team. Adan Dahir told BBC Somali that Ali Abukar had undergone rigorous training to prepare for participation in the last two years. However, Ali Abukar declared that she had only been training for one month.

== Aftermath ==
=== Response ===
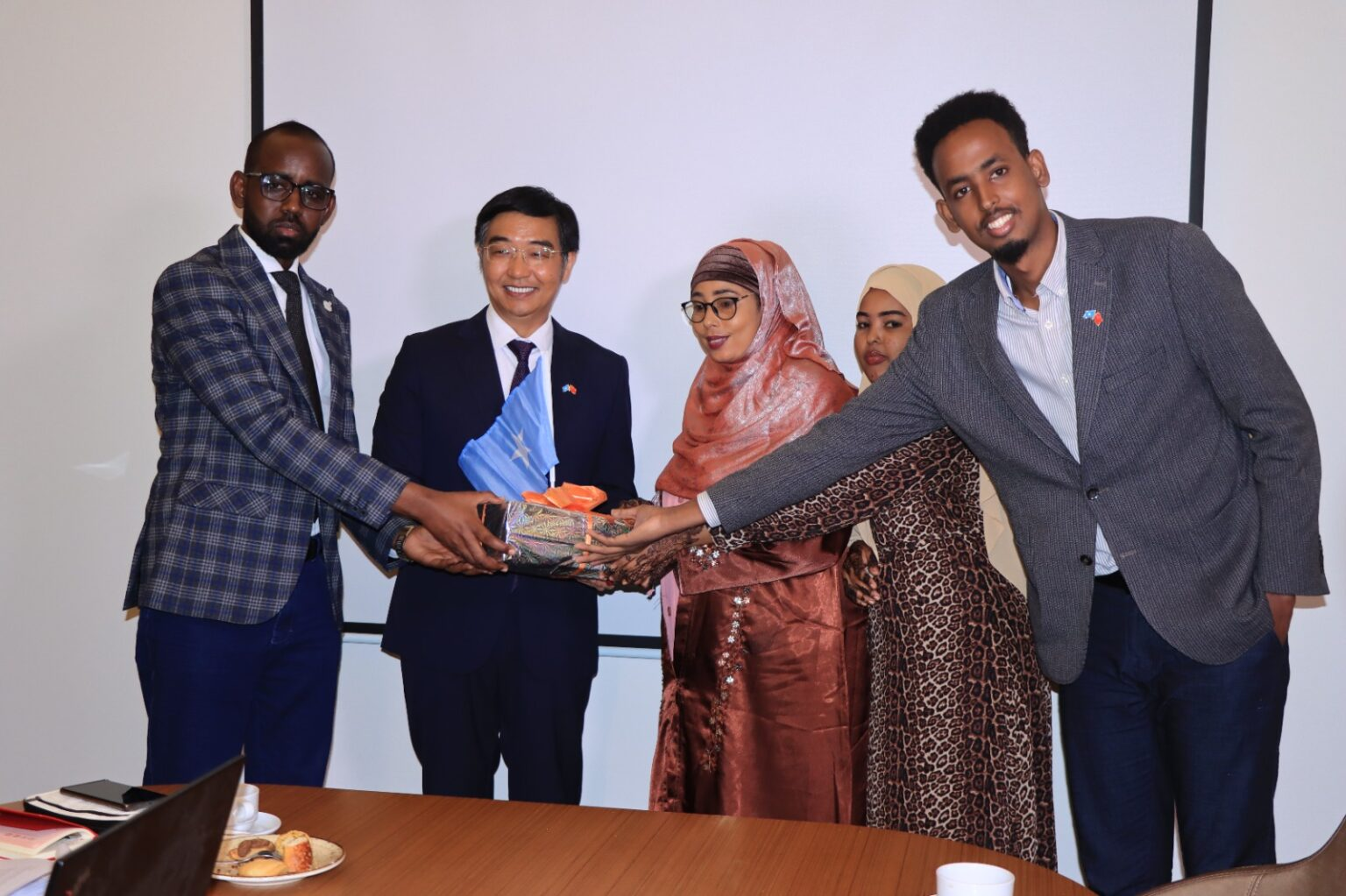
Senior officials from the Somali Ministry of Sports during the farewell ceremony for their delegation participating in the 31st Summer World University Games

The Somali Athletics Committee issued an apology regarding the contentious selection of the athlete. Somali Minister of Sports Mohamed Barre also apologized over the incident, claiming that his ministry was not aware Ali Abukar had been selected to compete at the games, and expressed his concern, stating that it was a "misrepresentation and embarrassment" for the country.

On August 3, 2023, Ali Abukar responded to criticism from fellow nationals labeling her "the worst athlete in international games", stating, "Somalis deserve to be represented in a running competition; I ran with a sprained leg, […] but I still managed to finish the run."

=== Suspension and investigation ===
Mohamed Barre vowed to conduct a thorough investigation into the selection process that resulted in Ali Abukar being chosen. He later stated that inquiries with the Somali Olympic Committee revealed that Ali Abukar had no background in running or any other sports. On August 2, 2023, The Olympic committee implemented an order by the minister to suspend Khadija Aden Dahir from her position for "abuse of power, nepotism, and defaming the name of the nation".

== See also ==
- Eric Moussambani
- Rachael Gunn
- List of uncompetitive athletes
