= Ocean University =

Ocean University may refer to

- Dalian Ocean University
- Guangdong Ocean University
- Indian Ocean University
- Korea Maritime and Ocean University
- National Taiwan Ocean University
- Ocean University of China
- Ocean University of Sri Lanka
- Shanghai Ocean University
- Zhejiang Ocean University
