= ZFC (disambiguation) =

ZFC — Zermelo–Fraenkel set theory, with choice — is a foundation of modern mathematics.

ZFC may also refer to:

== Association football ==
- Zeyashwemye F.C., Burma
- ZFC Meuselwitz, Germany
- Zhejiang Professional F.C., China

== Places ==
- Zico Football Center, Rio de Janeiro, Brazil
- Zambia Forestry College, Kitwe

== Mathematics ==
- ZF¬C (ZF with the negation of the axiom of choice added as axiom) from Paul Cohen on top of Zermelo–Fraenkel
- ZF(C) (ZF with or without the axiom of choice), variations on Zermelo–Fraenkel set theory

== Other uses ==
- Nikon Zfc, a crop-sensor mirrorless camera produced by Nikon
