= Clément Antoine Bayema =

Cameroonian footballer

Clément Bayema
Personal information
- Full name: Clément-Antoine Bayema
- Date of birth: July 9, 1988 (age 38)
- Place of birth: Douala, Cameroon
- Height: 1.86 m (6 ft 1 in)
- Position: Midfielder

Team information
- Current team: University of Ngaoundéré
- Number: 26

Senior career*
Years	Team	Apps	(Gls)
2004–2006	Cotonsport Garoua	22	(7)
2006–2007	Étoile du Congo	11	(0)
2008–2010	Cotonsport Garoua	20	(0)
2010–	University of Ngaoundéré		

International career
2009–	Cameroon B	2	(0)
- * Club domestic league appearances and goals

Clément-Antoine Bayema (born July 9, 1988 in Douala) is a professional Cameroonian footballer currently playing for University of Ngaoundéré.

== Career ==
He played previously for Cotonsport Garoua and Étoile du Congo.

== International career ==
Bayema was called to the Cameroonian national team for play the 2009 CEMAC Cup.
