= Sutech =

Sutech can mean

- Shiraz University of Technology - a university in Shiraz, Iran
- SUTECH - Somaliland University of Technology, Hargeisa, Somaliland
- Set (mythology), an ancient Egyptian god of strength, violence, and disorder
