= MOEHE =

MoEHE may refer to:

- Ministry of Education and Higher Education (Palestine)
- Ministry of Education and Higher Education (Quebec)
- Ministry of Education and Higher Education (Lebanon)
- Ministry of Education and Higher Education (Puntland)
- Ministry of Education and Higher Education (Qatar)
