= Salah Eddine Dahmoune =

Algerian politician

Minister of the Interior and Local Authorities
- In office April 2, 2019 – December 19, 2019
- President: Abdelmadjid Tebboune
- Preceded by: Noureddine Bedoui
- Succeeded by: Kamel Beldjoud

Personal details
- Born: December 8, 1964 (age 61) Guelma Province, Algeria
- Education: National School of Administration, Algeria

Salah Eddine Dahmoune is an Algerian politician who served as the Minister of the Interior from April 2 to December 19, 2019.

== Biography ==
Dahmoune was born in Guelma Province on December 8, 1964. He attended the El Feth Primary school until 1974, when he moved to Bordj Bou Arréridj Province and attended Ben Tabib Abderrachid school. He graduated from Said Zerrouki high school in 1984, and attended the National School of Administration in Algiers and obtained a diploma in health administration in 1988.

He was appointed Minister of the Interior on April 2, 2019, having previously served as the Secretary-General for the Ministry of the Interior. In his swearing-in ceremony, Dahmoune stated that stability and national security were his priorities. During his time as Interior Minister, Dahmoune held summits with his Libyan counterpart Fathi Bashagha, developed the Algerian Space Agency, and insisted on developing more nursing and police schools.

On December 3, 2019, amidst the Hirak protests, Dahmoune called protesters and opponents of the 2019 Algerian presidential election "pseudo-Algerians, traitors, deviants, and homosexuals" who "convey the remaining ideas of colonialism." His remarks sparked massive backlash among the Algerian public, and he was forced to retract his statements. Dahmoune was dismissed by President Abdelmadjid Tebboune on December 19 following the resignation of the Bedoui government.
