= Khadra Hussein Mohammad =

Somali lawyer

- Education: University of Hargeisa
- Occupation: Lawyer
- Known for: First National Deputy Prosecutor in Somaliland

Khadra Hussein Mohammad is a Somali lawyer, who became the first National Deputy Prosecutor in Somaliland in 2010. She was supported in her training by the United Nations Development Programme. Mohammad is also the first female judge in Somalia.

== Career ==
Khadra Hussein Mohammad's legal training was supported by the United Nations Development Programme. She studied at the Law School within the University of Hargeisa, which was established by the UNDP. Mohammad then joined the Somaliland Lawyers Association which enabled her to access further legal training from the UNDP. She praised the organisation, saying that it was one of the main components that has led to her success as a lawyer.

After completing that training, she worked for a year as a paralegal in the National Prosecutor's office. She was named as the National Deputy Prosecutor in 2010, the first time that a woman had held the position. She said that the increase in the number of female lawyers due to the work of the UNDP has meant that female victims have been more willing to engage with them.

== See also ==
- First women lawyers around the world
