= Kamel Beldjoud =

Algerian politician

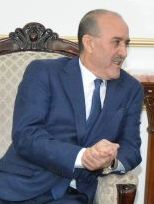

Minister of Transport
- In office 8 September 2022 – 16 March 2023
- President: Abdelmadjid Tebboune
- Prime Minister: Aymen Benabderrahmane
- Preceded by: Salah Eddine Dahmoune
- Succeeded by: Youcef Chorfa

Minister of Housing and Urban Development
- In office 2 April 2019 – 4 January 2020
- President: Abdelmadjid Tebboune; Abdelkader Bensalah (Acting)
- Preceded by: Abdelwahid Temmar
- Succeeded by: Kamel Nasri

Minister of Interior and Local Government
- In office 19 December 2019 – 7 September 2022

Personal details
- Born: 1957 (age 68–69) Algiers, French Algeria

Kamel Beldjoud (Arabic: كمال بلجود; born 1957 in Algiers) is an Algerian politician. Previously he had served as minister of transport between 8 September 2022 and 16 March 2023.

He has held several positions in state institutions since 1982. He was minister of housing, town planning and the city from March 31 to December 19, 2019, then minister of the interior, Local Government and Regional Planning since December 19, 2019.

In August 2022, Beldjoud responded to the country's widespread wildfires.

== Education ==
Beldjoud holds a diploma in statistical engineering.

== See also ==
- Cabinet of Algeria
