= Jamhuriya University of Science and Technology =

Private university in Mogadishu, Somalia

Jamhuriya University of Science & Technology (JUST) جامعة جمهورية للعلوم والتكنولوجيا Jaamacada Jamhuriya
- Motto: Home of Quality Education
- Type: Private, Non-profit
- Established: 2011; 15 years ago
- President: Eng. Abdirizak Warsame Abdulle
- Undergraduates: Yes
- Postgraduates: Yes
- Location: Mogadishu, Somalia
- Campus: Digfeer and Banaadir
- Colours: Green and Blue
- Website: just.edu.so

Jamhuriya University of Science and Technology (JUST; Arabic: جامعة جمهورية للعلوم والتكنولوجيا, Somali: Jaamacada Jamhuriya) is an accredited private, private higher educational institution located in Mogadishu, Somalia. Established in 2011 by a group of Somali scholars and intellectuals, the university was founded to address the demand for high-quality higher education in the region.

== Academics ==
Jamhuriya University offers undergraduate and postgraduate programs across several disciplines, with an emphasis on science, technology, and healthcare fields.

== Campuses ==
JUST operates across two primary campus facilities within Mogadishu:

- Digfeer Campus
- Banaadir Campus

== See also ==
- List of universities in Somalia
- Education in Somalia

== Faculties ==
The university has currently the following faculties:

=== Faculty of Medicine & Health Science ===
- Bachelor of Medicine and General Surgery
- Bachelor of Nursing
- Bachelor of Public Health
- Bachelor of Medical Lab Technology
- Diploma in Pharmacology

=== Faculty of Engineering ===
- Bachelor of Civil Engineering
- Bachelor of Biomedical Engineering
- Bachelor of Electrical Engineering majoring in Telecommunications and Networking or Power and Energy

=== Faculty Computer & Information Technology ===
- Bachelor in Computer Application
- Bachelor in Multimedia
- Bachelor in Computer Networking and Security

=== Faculty Economic & Business Management ===
- Bachelor of Business Administration
- Bachelor of Public Administration
- Bachelor of Accounting & Finance

== Accreditation ==
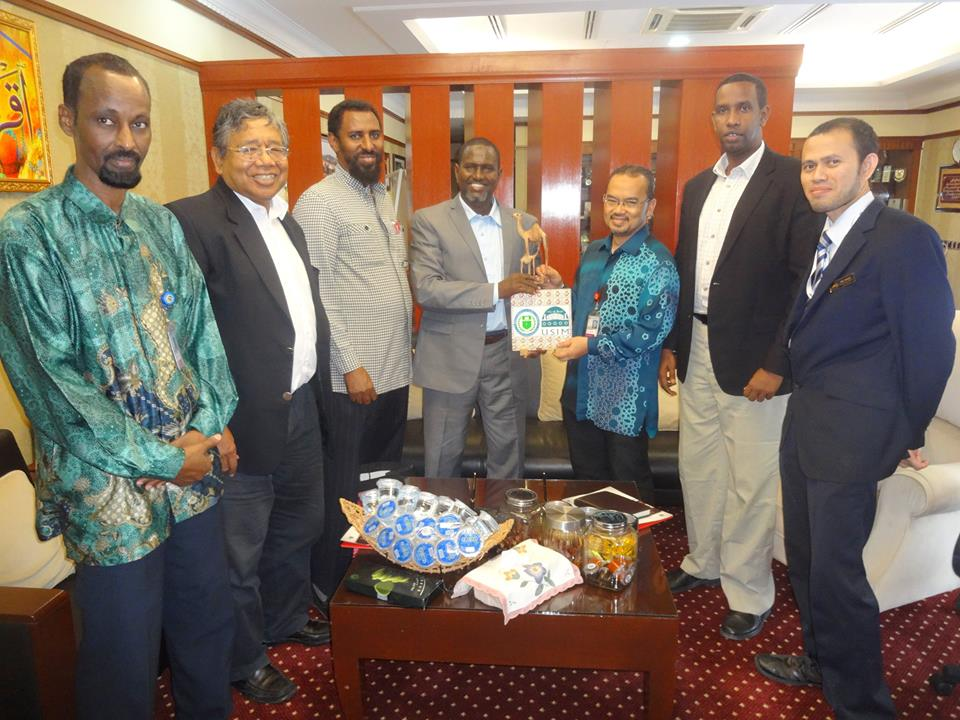
HESHIIS DHEXMARAY KULYADA CULUUMTA KUMBIYUTARKA EE UNIVERSITY MALAYA (UM) IYO JUST

As of 2013, Jamhuriya University of Science & Technology (JUST) has the full accreditation of the Directorate of Higher Education and Culture of the Federal Government of Somalia.

== Miscellaneous ==
Jamhuriya University Official Opening Ceremony., Jamhuriya University Blog.
