= Jazeera University =

Private university in Mogadishu, Somalia

Jazeera University جامعة الجزيرة Jaamacadda Jazeera
- Motto: Teach me goodness, discipline and knowledge
- Type: Private university
- Established: February 2010
- President: Dr. Sheikhdon Salad Elmi
- Undergraduates: Yes
- Postgraduates: Yes
- Location: Mogadishu, Somalia
- Colors
- Website: jazeerauniversity.edu.so

Jazeera University Arabic: جامعة الجزيرة, Somali: Jaamacada Jazeera, is a private university in Mogadishu, Somalia. It was established in February 2010 by a group of Somali scholars.

The university is listed in the International Association of Universities World Higher Education Database (WHED) and is recognized by Somalia's National Commission for Higher Education and Ministry of Higher Education and Culture. It offers bachelor's degrees in fields including agriculture, business administration, computer science, education, engineering, health sciences, information technology, medicine, and veterinary science.

== History ==
Jazeera University was established in February 2010 in Mogadishu by a group of Somali scholars. A 2013 report by the Heritage Institute for Policy Studies listed Jazeera University among Somalia's private higher education institutions and recorded its establishment year as 2010.

== Campus and facilities ==
The university's main campus is located in the Hodan District of Mogadishu. Facilities listed by the university include a library, medical laboratory, and computer laboratory.

== Academics ==
Jazeera University offers undergraduate degree programs in a range of professional and academic fields. The International Association of Universities lists bachelor's degree programs in agriculture, Arabic, business administration, computer science, economics, education, engineering, geology, health sciences, information technology, medicine, public health, surgery, technology, and veterinary science.

The university's current academic structure includes nine faculties: Medicine and Surgery, Dentistry, Health Sciences, Engineering and Technology, Computer Science and Information Technology, Economics and Management Science, Agricultural Science, Veterinary Science, and Education.

=== Faculties ===
- Faculty of Medicine and Surgery
- Faculty of Dentistry
- Faculty of Health Sciences
- Faculty of Engineering and Technology
- Faculty of Computer Science and Information Technology
- Faculty of Economics and Management Science
- Faculty of Agricultural Science
- Faculty of Veterinary Science
- Faculty of Education

== Research ==
Researchers affiliated with Jazeera University have published studies on topics including antimicrobial resistance, health financing, and food security in Somalia.

== Student life ==
=== Student governance ===
The university has a student representative body known as the Jazeera University Students Union (JUSU), which represents student interests and coordinates student activities.

== Accreditation and affiliations ==
Jazeera University is recognized by Somalia's National Commission for Higher Education and Ministry of Higher Education and Culture.

The university is listed in the International Association of Universities World Higher Education Database (WHED), which records it as a private institution founded in 2010 in Mogadishu.

The Association of Arab Universities lists Jazeera University among its member universities in Somalia.

== See also ==
- List of universities in Somalia
- Education in Somalia
