= Baresan University =

University in Somalia

- Other names: BSU
- Motto: Education is a powerful Weapon to change the World.
- Type: Private
- Established: 2010; 16 years ago
- President: Abdulrazak Adam Jimale
- Rector: Abdi Abdullahi Mohamed
- Students: 2,625
- Undergraduates: 2,195
- Postgraduates: 430
- Location: Mogadishu, Banaadir, Somalia
- Campus: Mogadishu Campus, Lower Shabelle Compus
- Colors: Orange and navy
- Website: baresanuniversity.net

Baresan University (BSU) (Arabic: جامعة بريسن, Somali: Jaamacada Bare san) is a private higher education institution which is non-political, non-partisan and non-sectarian. It was established in 2010. Baresan University was established at a time when young Somali secondary graduates could hardly get an opportunity to continue their education after secondary school due to the scarcity of tertiary education institutions in Somalia.

== History ==
The collapse of the Somali state and the subsequent civil war(s) from 1990s have altered most aspects of Somali lives; but they have been particularly devastating in the area of education, where an entire generation has lost out on one of the most precious opportunities of childhood and adults. The restoration of regular schooling and universities are critical if Somalis expect to survive the present upheaval and envision a hopeful future.

The scheme to launch Baresan University was advanced by a group of intellectuals led by Dr Abdulrazak Adam Jimale. After more than five years of investigation and consultation the university began at the end of 2010.

== Campus ==
Baresan University has one campus in Banaadir

=== Mogadishu campus ===
The main campus is located in Mogadishu Banadir.

== Academics ==
The university offers undergraduate courses in the natural sciences, the social sciences, the Technology and professional studies. Scholarships are available.

The medium of instruction in undergraduate programs is English and Arabic. Applicants are required to pass an English examination if they are from a non-English speaking country. Engalish language support at all levels is provided by the Languages Unit.

== Colleges ==
=== Economics and Management Science College ===
- Faculty of Business Management
- Faculty of Banking & Finance
- Faculty of Accounting
- Faculty of Economics
- Faculty of Marketing
- Faculty of HRM

=== Agriculture and Vet medicine College ===
- Faculty of Agriculture
- Faculty of Veterinary Medicine

=== Medicine & Health Science College ===
- Faculty of Medicine & Surgery
- Faculty of Medical Laboratory
- Faculty of Public Health
- Faculty Of Neuroscience
- Faculty Of Nutrition

=== Education & Mass Media College ===
- Faculty of Education
- Faculty of Journalism

=== Engineering College ===
- Faculty of Computer Science
- Faculty of Civil Engineering

=== Islamic Studies College ===
- Faculty of Sharia & Law

=== Languages College ===
- Faculty of Arabic Language
- Faculty of English Literature
