= Al Qasimia University =

National university in Sharjah

- الجامعة القاسمية
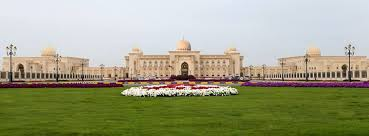
- Other names: Qasimiyya University, AQU
- Established: 2014
- Founders: Sheikh Dr. Sultan Bin Mohammed Al Qasimi
- Chancellor: Sheikh Dr. Sultan Bin Mohammed Al Qasimi
- Vice-Chancellor: Dr. Rashad Mohammed Salem
- Director: Dr. Awad Al-Khalf
- Location: University City, Sharjah, United Arab Emirates; 25.2964°N 55.4627°E
- Language: Arabic, English
- Website: www.alqasimia.ac.ae

Al Qasimia University (also called as AQU) is a national university located in Sharjah. It was established in year 2014 by its founder, president and chairman, the ruler of Sharjah His Highness Sheikh Dr. Sultan Bin Mohammed Al Qasimi.
