= Higher Normal School of Bujumbura =

Coordinates: 3.3596°S 29.3844°E

- École Normale Supérieure de Bujumbura
- Type: Public
- Established: 1965; 60 years ago
- Location: Bujumbura, Burundi
- Website: ens.bi

The Higher Normal School of Bujumbura (ENS) is a public higher education institution in Burundi.

== History ==
The Higher Normal School of Bujumbura was established in 1965, a year after the foundation of the official university of Bujumbura. The ENS aims to train educators for the general, pedagogical, technical, and professional secondary education.

In 1973, the ENS merged with the Official University of Bujumbura (UOB) and the National School of Administration (ENA) to become the University of Burundi.

In 1999, the ENS became an independent structure again with 3 departments, the same departments it had since its establishment.

Since 2011, the Higher Normal School has adopted the BMD system (Bachelor-Master-Doctorate).
