= Traditional education in Somalia =

Educational system of Somalia before colonialism

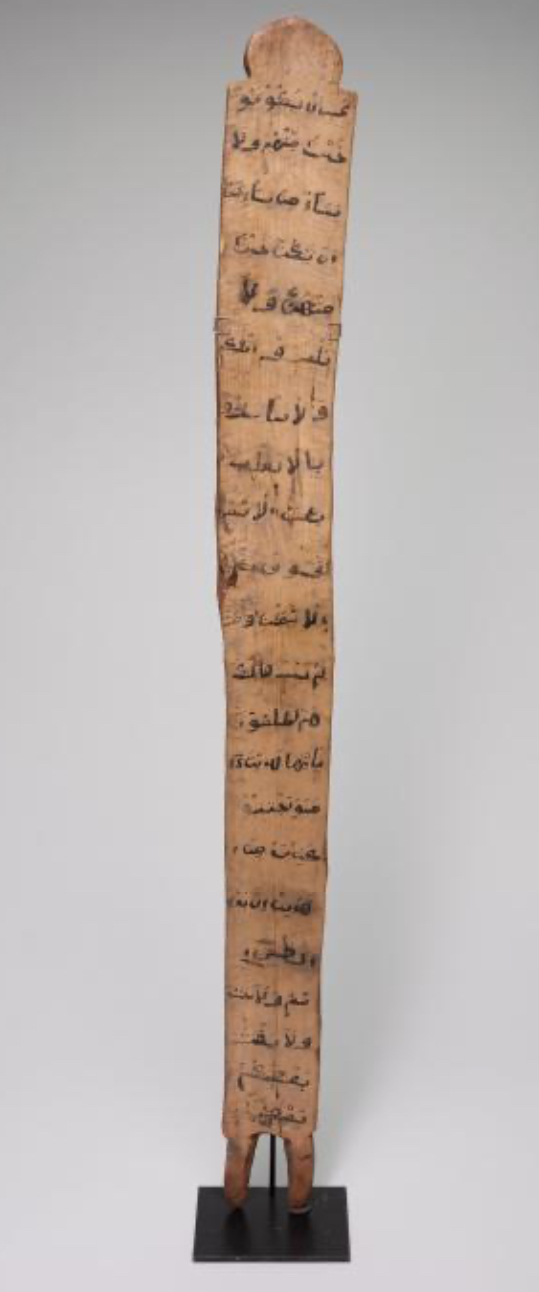
Surah Al-Hujurat written on a wooden Somali Loox board

Somali Traditional education revolves around Islamic teaching through Quran’ic schools how would teach who to read and write Arabic. These schools were mainly taught by Wadaads, wandering literate clergymen who would mediate between clans and perform rites of passage (births, marriages, funerals).

== Quran’ic Schools ==
The earliest records of Quran’ic schools in Somalia come from Francisco Alvarez’s description of the port town of Maydh in northern Somalia in 1520. Alvarez describes a large school for children in the middle of the town with ink pots and wooden boards for writing. The medieval Yemeni chronicler Shihab ad Din Ahmed notes the Somali leader of the Adal Sultanate, Ahmed Gurey, communicated with his governors and subordinates through letters which were exchanged throughout their campaign in Abyssinia. This implies that most Somali elites were literate unlike their Abyssinian peers.
