= Ministry of Education (Somalia) =

Government ministry of Somalia

The Ministry of Education of Somalia (Somali: Wasaaradda Waxbarashada) (Arabic: وزارة التعليم) is the ministry responsible for education in Somalia. The current Minister of Education of Somalia is Dr. Farah Sh. Abdulkadir Mohamed, who hails from Reer aw hassan (Sheekhaal).

== Introduction ==
Ministry of Education & Culture was the ministry that was responsible for education and culture in Somalia. The ministry has ten departments. On 17 January 2014, newly appointed prime minister, Abdiweli Sheikh Ahmed, split the ministerial portfolio into Ministry of Education, Ministry of Culture, and Higher Education, respectively.

== Organization ==
- Minister of Education
  - Deputy Minister
    - Secretary-General
    - Under the Authority of Secretary-General
      - Internal Audit Division
      - Corporate Communications Unit
      - Education Performance and Delivery Unit
    - Deputy Secretary-General (Education Development)
      - Education Development Division
      - Procurement and Asset Management Division
      - Policy and International Relations Division
    - Deputy Secretary-General (Management)
      - Finance Division
      - Human Resource Management Division
      - Account Division
    - Director-General of Education
      - Deputy Director-General of Education
        - Educational Planning and Research Division
        - Curriculum Development Division
        - Examination Syndicate
      - Under the Authority of Director-General of Education
        - Banaadir Education Department
        - Lower Shabele Education Department
        - Baay Education Department
        - Bakool Education Department
        - Gedo Education Department
        - Middle Juba Education Department
        - Lower Juba Education Department
        - Middle Shabele Education Department
        - Hiiraan Education Department
        - Galgaduud Education Department
        - Puntland State Education Department
        - Somaliland State Education Department
      - Department of umbrella and private education
      - Department of Public Schools
      - Office of examinations and Certification
