= Horseed International University =

Somali university

Coordinates: 2.03150°N 45.31057°E

- Location: Mogadishu, Somalia

Horseed International University (HIU) is a university based in Banaadir, Mogadishu, Somalia.

The university was founded in 2010. It is a non-profit private university. HIU is part of an international collaboration on health education led by RIT Croatia.
