= Arab Academy for Management, Banking and Financial Sciences =

Academic organization in Cairo, Egypt

- الأكاديمية العربية للعلوم الإدارية والمالية والمصرفية
- Other names: AAMBFS
- Former names: Arab Academy for Banking and Financial Sciences (AABFS)
- Established: 1988
- Location: 8 Fawakeh, Ad Doqi, Dokki, Giza, Cairo, Egypt; 30.050820°N 31.202388°E
- Website: www.aambfs.org

The Arab Academy for Management, Banking and Financial Sciences (AAMBFS), formerly known as The Arab Academy for Banking and Financial Sciences (AABFS), is a regional non-profit organization founded in 1985 and established in 1988 in Amman, Jordan with campuses across all the Arab countries. It is affiliated with the Council of Arab Economic Unity and works under the auspices of the Secretariat General of the Arab League; enjoying financial and administrative independence. In 2015, the university relocated from Amman, Jordan to Cairo, Egypt.
