= Pigier Côte d'Ivoire =

Private educational institution in Abidjan, Côte d'Ivoire

- Type: Private Grande école
- Established: 1956
- Location: Abidjan, Côte d'Ivoire
- Campus: Plateau
- Website: www.pigierci.com

Pigier Côte d'Ivoire, located in Plateau in Abidjan, is one of the first international establishments of the Pigier network of private schools. It educates and trains both students and professionals. This institution has existed since 1956 in Côte d'Ivoire, and the global network has over 150 years of existence.

== Fields of study ==
Pigier Côte d'Ivoire offers training in various fields including:

=== Finance and Accounting ===
These programs teach mastery of accounting and financial management techniques in business. The training includes:

- Undergraduate (Professional License in Finance and Accounting; Auditing and Management Control)
- Graduate (Professional Master in Finance/Accounting; Master in Auditing and Management Control)

=== Administration and Commerce ===
This training focuses on mastering business management techniques. It prepares students for:

- Undergraduate degrees such as Professional License in Office Secretariat, Bilingual Secretariat, Corporate Communication, SME/SMI Management Assistant, Commercial Management, Bilingual Executive Assistant, and Negotiation/Multimedia Communication
- Graduate degrees such as Professional Master in Marketing and Communication and Professional Master in Business Administration

=== Information Systems and Telecommunications ===
This training focuses on mastering IT and telecommunications systems in business. It includes:

- Undergraduate (Application Developer, Software Engineering Networks)
- Graduate (Master in IT Engineering and Networks)

== Description ==
Pigier Côte d'Ivoire claims:

- More than 3000 students
- Over 48 classrooms
- An audiovisual production workshop
- A placement office that maintains close relations with the job market (assisting students in job searching and following up with them)
- A digital documentation center
- A wide range of tertiary and IT training up to BAC+5 level
- State-recognized diplomas (BTS) and diplomas recognized by the CAMES BAC+5
- Over 150 years of global existence and 50 years in Côte d'Ivoire
