= CITYCOT University =

University in Puntland, Somalia

- Motto: Skills for Tomorrow:
- Established: 2016; 10 years ago
- Founder: Eng. Abdulhakim Husein Osman (URUG)
- Location: Bosaso, Somalia
- Campus: Urban
- Colours: Red, blue
- Website: www.citycot.edu.so

CITYCOT University is in Bosaso, Puntland state of Somalia. It is a non-profit higher education institution.
