= Admas University College–Addis Ababa =

Tertiary higher education institution in Ethiopia

Coordinates: 9.0235557°N 38.7864765°E

Admas University
- አድማስ ዩኒቨርሲቲ
- Type: Tertiary
- Established: October 1998
- Accreditation: Regional Educational Bureaus; Higher Education Relevance and Quality Assurance Agency (HERQA); Ministry of Education
- President: Molla Tsegay
- General Manager: Yibrah Girmay
- Academic staff: 51–200
- Students: 9,489
- Undergraduates: 37,000
- Location: Addis Ababa, Ethiopia
- Colors
- Website: www.admasuniversity.edu.et

Admas University (Amharic: አድማስ ዩኒቨርሲቲ) is a tertiary higher education institution based in Addis Ababa, Ethiopia. It was established in 1998.

== Overview ==
The Admas University is accredited by Regional Educational Bureaus, Higher Education Relevance and Quality Agency (HERQA), and the Federal Ministry of Education of Ethiopia. It offers both on-campus education and distance learning in various programs. These courses are in turn offered at a number of levels: certificate, diploma and degree.

The University has also started many e-Learning programs to develop the Ethiopian Higher Educational System. To reach these goals, it is currently working in partnership with institutions such as Cisco and the University of Lübeck in Germany.

Admas has additional branches in Hargeisa and Garowe, situated in the Republic of Somaliland and the autonomous Puntland region of Somalia, respectively.

== See also ==
- List of universities and colleges in Ethiopia
- Education in Ethiopia
