= Ministry of Education and Higher Education (Puntland) =

Ministry within the Government of Puntland

- Wasaaradda Waxbrashada iyo Tacliinta Sare وزارة التربية والتعليم العالي

Agency overview
- Formed: 1 August 1998
- Jurisdiction: Government of Puntland
- Headquarters: Garowe, Puntland
- Minister responsible: Fu’aad Abshir Ahmed
- Website: https://moeplstate.so/

The Puntland Ministry of Education and Higher Education MOEHE (Somali: Wasaaradda Waxbrashada iyo Tacliinta Sare; Arabic: وزارة التربية والتعليم العالي) is a government ministry of the Government of Puntland, responsible for the supervision of public and private educational system, agreements and authorizations under a national curriculum and syllabus in Education in Puntland. The ministry is headed by Fu’aad Abshir Ahmed.

== List of ministers ==
- Abdi Farah Said Juha, 2009–2014.
- Ali Haji Warsame, 2014–2015.
- Abshir Aw-Yusuf Isse, 2015–2019.
- Abdullahi Mohamed Hassan, 2019–2024.
- Fuad Abshir Ahmed, 2024–present.
