= Jobkey University =

University in Mogadishu, Somalia

Coordinates: 2.03210°N 45.30475°E

- Established: 2011; 15 years ago
- Location: Mogadishu, Somalia

Jaamacadda Jobkey or Jobkey University (JU), founded in 2011, is a university located in Somalia with its main campus in Mogadishu, Somalia's capital city. It is a chartered university and is approved by the Somali Federal Government and the Ministry of Higher Education and Culture. Its motto states, 'Success Starts Here'.

It has an enrollment range of 1,000-1,999 students in its coeducational higher education institution formally affiliated with the Islamic religion. Its admission rate is between 60 and 70%, making it a somewhat selective Somali higher education organization.

The idea of launching the university was advanced by a group of intellectuals and other diaspora people. After more than three years of preparation, the university became operational at the end of 2011. The university has two campuses in Mogadishu, Banaadir: one is in Jowhar and the other one is in Beledweyne.
