= Tadamun =

Organization based in Bosaso, Somalia

Tadamun Social Society
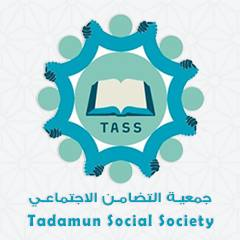
- Founded at: Puntland
- Type: NGO; Nonprofit organization
- Headquarters: Bosaso, Puntland
- Region served: National
- Official language: Somali, Arabic, English
- Website: http://www.tadamun.so

Tadamun Social Society (TASS) is a national, NGO, non-profit, and non-political organization based in Bosaso, Bari region. The organization is registered in Puntland and closely collaborates with line ministries to provide inclusive services to communities.

== History ==
Tadamun was established in 1992 by Somali national intellectuals who felt the importance and need in the region of such NGO and it started it operation in Bosaso through establishing schools. Tadamun started its operation in Bosaso and later expanded to major cities of Puntland. Currently, the organization has branch offices in Garowe and Galkayo.

Gradual expansion occurred and Tadamun schools became popular in whole of Puntland producing yearly large numbers of students both primary and secondary.

== Management ==
As of 2016, Abdirahman Abdirazak Abdirahman is the CEO of Tadamun Social Society.

== Programs ==
=== Education ===
Tadamun focuses in education and getting children back to school. This has been successful and the organization has sent thousands of children to education centers.

=== Other programs ===
The other activities of the organization include water and sanitation hygiene, protection and relief.
