= AES Algiers =

Higher education institution in Algeria

Coordinates: 36°38′27.5″N 2°47′29.1″E

National Higher School of Statistics and Applied Economics المدرسة الوطنية العليا للاحصاء و الاقتصاد التطبيقي الجزائر
- Type: Public
- Established: 1970
- President: Ahmad Zekane
- Provost: Khaled Ben Azzouz
- Students: ≥5000 (2009–10)
- Location: (Algeria) Algiers, Algeria
- Website: https://enssea.net/

The National Higher School of Statistics and Applied Economics in Algiers (in French: École nationale supérieure de statistique et d'économie appliquée, ENSSEA d'Alger, in Arabic: المدرسة الوطنية العليا للاحصاء و الاقتصاد التطبيقي), called as well AES Algiers, is a public institution of higher education in Algeria. It was founded as αν institute of planning technics in 1970. The school is among the few institutions in the field of statistics and applied economics in Africa. It ensures the best programs of Statistics, Finance and Economy in Algeria.

== History ==
In 1970, governmental decree N° 7-109 gave the green light to establish the Institute of Planning Technics (IPT) in order to form trained economists to the development of national plans for development in the field of economic analysis and technics. The institute was renamed to Institute of Planning Technics and Applied Economy (IPTAE) in 1972 and to National Institute of Planning and Statistics (NIPS) in 1983.

By 2008, the National Institute of Planning and Statistics (NIPS) became National Higher School of Statistics and Applied Economy.

List of AES Algiers ex-names
Name	Period	French	Arabic
IPT IPTAE NIPS AES Algiers	1970 - 1972 1972-1983 1983-2008 2008 - today	ITP ITPEA INPS ENSSEA d'Alger	معهد تقنيات التخطيط معهد تقنيات التخطيط و الاقتصاد التطبيقي المعهد الوطني للتخطيط و الاحصاء المدرسة الوطنية العليا للاحصاء و الاقتصاد التطبيقي الجزائر

== Admissions ==
Students take a competitive entrance examination, known as Le Concours Nationale.

== Programs ==
AES Algiers offers undergraduate and postgraduate programs.

=== Undergraduate ===
There are two cycles, first and second.

First cycle The students study for three years in order to make the best choice for the second cycle. In the first year, students study political economy, law, economic geography, mathematical analysis and descriptive statistics.

Students are given a grounding in microeconomic and macroeconomic theory during the second and third of study, when they study probabilities, accounting, international and national economy, operational research, mathematical statistics and computer science.

During the two first years, the students are giving courses in Business English and Business French.
