= Zamzam University of Science and Technology =

Higher education institution in Somalia

Coordinates: 2.07024°N 45.26444°E

- Zamzam University logo
- Motto in English: Connects Learning to Real Life
- Type: Privet Non profit university
- Established: 2014; 12 years ago
- Affiliations: Zamzam Foundation [IHH Humanitarian Relief Foundation] AAU; AARU; ASU; AARINENA
- Rector: Mohamud Mohamed Harbi
- Location: Mogadishu, Somalia
- Colours: Light Blue and Blue
- Website: zust.edu.so

Zamzam University of Science and Technology (ZUST) is a Somali higher education institution founded in 2013 for the purpose of excelling human capacity needed in the nation. The university has main campus in Mogadishu, Somalia and also has campuses in the cities of Baidoa and Jowhar.

== History ==
In 2012, Zamzam foundation started agricultural training school declared its purpose to be “rebuilding food production system of the country and accelerate its yield, while promoting income generation for low-income families”. The School conducted 22 training programs during that period. Agricultural training school became Zamzam University of Science & Technology (ZUST) in 2013.

(ZUST) served a platform that can support the production of human capacity and reduce poverty and hunger. In 2013, the university offered its first graduate-level courses. The faculty of agriculture opened in 2014, followed in 2015 by the faculty of Medicine. Currently the ZUST has six faculties and center for graduate studies. The permanent campus of the university is located in the KM11 weydoow Mogadishu and is began operations on 4 September 2016.

== Academics ==
Faculty	Program
Faculty of Agriculture	Bachelor of Agriculture
Faculty of Agriculture	Bachelor of Animal Science
Faculty of Medicine & Surgery	Bachelor of Medicine
Faculty of Health Science	Bachelor of Medical Laboratory
Faculty of Health Science	Bachelor of Nursing
Faculty of Health Science	Bachelor of Public Health
Faculty of Business and Management	Bachelor of Public Administration
Faculty of Business and Management	Bachelor of Banking and Finance
Faculty of Business and Management	Bachelor of Economics
Faculty of Computer and Information Science	Bachelor of Information Technology
Faculty of Engineering	Bachelor of Engineering

== Centers ==
- Research and Innovation Center (RIC)
- Center for Sustainable Agriculture and Environmental Studies (SAES)
- Center for Poultry Production
- Zamzam Techno Park
- BINA Business Incubator - Somalia

== Notable former and current administrators ==
- Prof. Dr. Ahmed Mumin Warfa
- Mohamud Mohamed Harbi (2022–Present)

== See also ==
- List of universities in Somali
