= Alexandria Higher Institute of Engineering and Technology =

Academic institution in Alexandria, Egypt

Coordinates: 31°13′13″N 29°57′00″E

Alexandria Higher Institute of Engineering and Technology (AIET) is a private institute for higher education founded in 1996 and owned by "Mohamed Ragab Foundation for Social Development" which is an organization registered with the Egyptian Government. It was named "Alexandria Institute of Technology (AIT)" till 2007 when its name was changed to "Alexandria Institute Of Engineering and Technology". It provides a bachelor's degree in engineering. Graduates can also be a member in Egyptian Engineering Syndicate.

== Undergraduate programs ==
The Alexandria Institute of Technology comprises four departments:

1. Electronics and Communications engineering department.
2. Computer engineering department.
3. Mechatronics engineering department.
4. Industrial engineering department.

== AIET Dean ==
The dean of AIET from 1996 till 2006 was Prof Dr. Mahmoud M. Shabana. The current dean is Prof Dr. El-Sayed Abdel-Moety El-Badawy who became dean in 2007. From 1996 till 2007 Prof Dr. M.Salah El-Dein Khalil served as the assistant dean.

== AIET Continuous Learning Center ==
Continuous learning center is aimed at developing community, student & teaching assistance skills by providing helpful courses and certificates. It has been certified by UNESCO, Microsoft, Cisco and Prometric International Exams Testing Lab. Business and Languages courses are also provided. The center is under the supervision of:

1. Dr. Ayman Shawky
2. Dr.Tamer Fouad Mabrok

== AIET Student Community ==
AIET Student Union Contains 6 Committee including:

1. Cultural Committee
2. Sports Committee
3. Social Committee
4. Arts Committee
5. Scouts Committee
6. Families Committee

== AIET Graduate Association ==
Graduate Association was established for the graduates in 2002, it is responsible for getting jobs for the graduates and organizing graduate parties & re-union meetings.

== See also ==
- Education in Egypt
- List of universities in Egypt
