= Admas University College–Garowe =

University in Puntland, Somalia

Coordinates: 8.397133478448904°N 48.47830588775727°E

Admas University–Garowe
- Established: March 2014; 12 years ago
- Accreditation: Ministry of Science and Higher Education; Higher Education Relevance and Quality Assurance Agency (HERQA)
- Location: Garowe, Nugal, Puntland, Somalia
- Colors
- Website: www.au.edu.et

Admas University Garowe Campus is a tertiary higher education institution in Garowe, the administrative capital of the autonomous Puntland region in northeastern Somalia. A campus of the Addis Ababa-based Admas University, it was established in March 2014. The university also has a second campus in Hargeisa, the administrative capital of the autonomous Somaliland republic.

== Faculties ==
Faculty of Business

- Accounting
- Economics
- Management
- Marketing Management

Faculty of Informatics

- Computer Science
- Information Technology
- Office Administration and Technology Systems

Faculty of Social Sciences

- Developmental Studies
- Sociology
- Educational Planning and Management

Faculty of Health Sciences

- Health Officer

== See also ==
- Admas University College–Hargeisa
