= Burao University =

University of Burao (UB)
- Motto: Cilmi, Iimaan, Tacab; Knowledge, Faith, Effort
- Type: Public
- Established: 27 September 2004; 21 years ago
- Vice-Chancellor: Dr. Eisse Nour Liban
- Location: Burao, Togdheer, Somalia
- Campus: 2 suburban campuses
- Website: www.uob-edu.net

The University of Burao UB is a university in Burao, Somalia. It is an independent community-based higher education institution established in 2004 in Burao second best university in Somaliland, the capital city of Togdheer region in Somalia. Six batches graduated from UB until 2016. It has branches in other districts outside of Burao such as Sheikh, Aynabo and Oodweyne. In 2016, the school was selected as member of Association of Arab Universities. It has a bio-gas initiative done by faculty of Veterinary students and web development research done by faculty of ICT students. It has more than 10 faculties and departments.

== Campuses ==
The University of Burao main campus is located in the northwestern Shacab suburb of Burao, situated about two kilometres from the city center. The site has a fenced area of about 3.75 hectares (9.3 acres), and consists of:

- One hall for public lectures, workshops and other events
- Conference room
- Classrooms
- abdalle Area
- ICT Lab
- Science LAB
- Engineering LAB
- Veterinary LAB
- Library
- Printing press
- Bookshop
- Office block
- Laboratories
- Guest house
- Sports ground
- Cafeteria
- Prayer room (Mosque)

== Faculties ==
- Faculty of Animal Science & Agriculture
- Faculty of Education
- Faculty of Business Administration, Public Management and Economics.
- Faculty of Information Communication Technology
- Faculty of Medicine and Health Sciences
- Faculty of Languages
- Faculty of Sharia & Law
- Faculty of Community Development
- Faculty of Engineering
- School of Rural Development and Somali Studies
- Department of Research, Training and Short Courses

The first students were registered in September 2004. There are 167 pupils enrolled in four colleges and 430 in a short-term training program designed to upgrade the skills of the primary teachers in the region.

The university has a board of trustees responsible to the Togdheer Development Committee, and a president who is accountable to the board of trustees and who is in charge of the day-to-day affairs of the university.

=== Faculty of Veterinary Medicine ===
Livestock is the backbone of the nation's economy. About 50-60% of the population are classified as pastoralists, and another 20% as agro-pastoralists. The 1997 official government statistics estimates total livestock population in the country at around 23.5 million heads. Yet there are only about three dozen qualified veterinarians in the whole country, which means a doctor/stock ratio of about 1: 653,000, and there are no training institutions (apart from a middle level technical institute recently opened in Sheikh), or research facilities to support this vital sector. The aim of the department is to prepare professionals in the field of animal health and husbandry and to carry out research.

=== Faculty of Education ===
According to the Ministry of Education statistics 106,480 students are enrolled in both public and private schools in the Scholastic Year 2003/4. The number of teachers serving is 2,590, out of which only 241 have university degrees. This means a teacher/student ratio of 1:41, and a graduate teacher/student ratio of only1:442. Both ratios are extremely low. The reason why there is such a small number of graduate teachers is that the only college, Lafoole (Somali National University) which trained teachers has been closed for the past 13 years due to the civil war.

=== Faculty of Business and Finance ===
The college carries out business research, provides technical support to the business community, and organizes business seminars and conferences and exhibitions

=== Facultyof Islamic Studies ===
There are no proper institutions of higher education for training and accreditation for pre-primary Qur'anic school teachers, nor for Islamic teachers in primary and secondary schools, nor for the imams who provide spiritual guidance to congregations in Mosques, nor for the judges who sit on Islamic Courts, which is part of the judicial system.

The aim of the Islamic college is to:

- Further the knowledge of Islam,
- Prepare Islamic teachers, preachers and judges,
- Re-train and accredit existing teachers, preachers and judges

=== Department of Continuing Education and Community Development ===
The college provides training and technical support to:

- Private sector entrepreneurs and employees
- Public sector workers
- Voluntary sector staff and volunteers
- Unemployed

=== Center for Somali Studies ===
The center:

- studies and advances Somali language and literature,
- preserve Somali culture and heritage,
- documents and analyzes Somali history and political development.

These are achieved by:

- undertaking research,
- organizing seminars, symposia and conferences,
- offering courses at the centre and on the internet,
- producing publications,
- establishing a library and an archive for records in print, microfiche, tape, electronic and film,
- creating a museum for photographic records, paintings, memorabilia, and artefacts.

=== Institute of Rural Development and Environmental Studies ===
The significance of this centre emerges from the fact that approximately two thirds of the population live in a rural or semi-rural setting. Their livelihood is under threat due to environmental degradation and climate changes.

The institute:

- carries out research into the causes of environmental degradation,
- monitors environmental degradation and the effects of such degradation on the lives of the pastoral community,
- raises national and international awareness of the environmental problems facing the rural population,
- carries out a national survey of the flora and the fauna stock,
- builds and maintains a data bank on rural ecosystems,
- publishes and promote research results,
- promotes good range and forestry management,
- provides training on rural development issues,
- links up with similar institutions worldwide.

== Organisation ==
The university has a charter and statutes that define its organisational structure, policies and procedures. At the top of its organisational pyramid is Togdheer Development Committee (TDC) which governs the university on behalf of the people of the Togdheer. The TDC elects a Board of trustees, which is the primary decision-making body of the university. The Board of trustees consists of 15 prominent members of the community, including businessmen, professionals, ex-officials and serving officials. The Board nominates, in turn, an executive committee, which consists of a chairman, a vice-chairman, a treasurer and a secretary.

The executive committee is represented by:

- Mohamud Adan Dheri (former governor) Chairman
- Farah Yusuf Hadhigele (Businessman) Vice Chairman
- Mohamed Hussien Adan (former mayor) Treasurer
- Dr. Issa Nur Liban (veterinary doctor) Secretary

The Board appoints a president who is responsible for the day-to-day running of the university and for carrying out decisions. Working with the president is the University Council, who is responsible for academic matters in relation to teaching, research and discipline. The university council consists of the deans of the colleges, the president, the vice president for admission and student affairs, the vice president for academic affairs and the vice president for administration and finance.

There are college and department councils: each college is headed by a dean and each department is headed by the head of department. The Deans are responsible for their respective colleges and are accountable to the President. In addition the university has a Research and Enterprise unit, charged with the coordination of research carried out by the university's own colleges and institutes and by international research associates.

The university has fundraising and technical support groups in most of the countries in the Middle East, Europe, Canada and USA.

=== Officials ===
- Chairman: Mohamud Adan Dheri (former governor)
- Vice Chairman: Farah Yusuf Hadhigele (businessman)
- Secretary: Dr. Issa Nur Liban (veterinary doctor)
- Treasurer: Mohamed Hussien Adan (former mayor)

== History ==
According to the statistics of the Somaliland Ministry of Education, there were 31 public and private primary schools in Burao, in which 11,627 students were enrolled in the scholastic year 2003/4. The region as whole had 73 primary schools in which nearly 16,000 students were enrolled. The expansion of secondary education has been equally rapid. The city has now six secondary schools, and a seventh secondary school is under construction.

The first class graduated from Burao secondary schools in 2003, and many more will do so in the coming years. The establishment of Burao University offers them an opportunity for higher education without leaving home.
