= University of Ngaoundéré =

Public university in Adamawa Region, Cameroon

University of Ngaoundere
- Université de Ngaoundéré
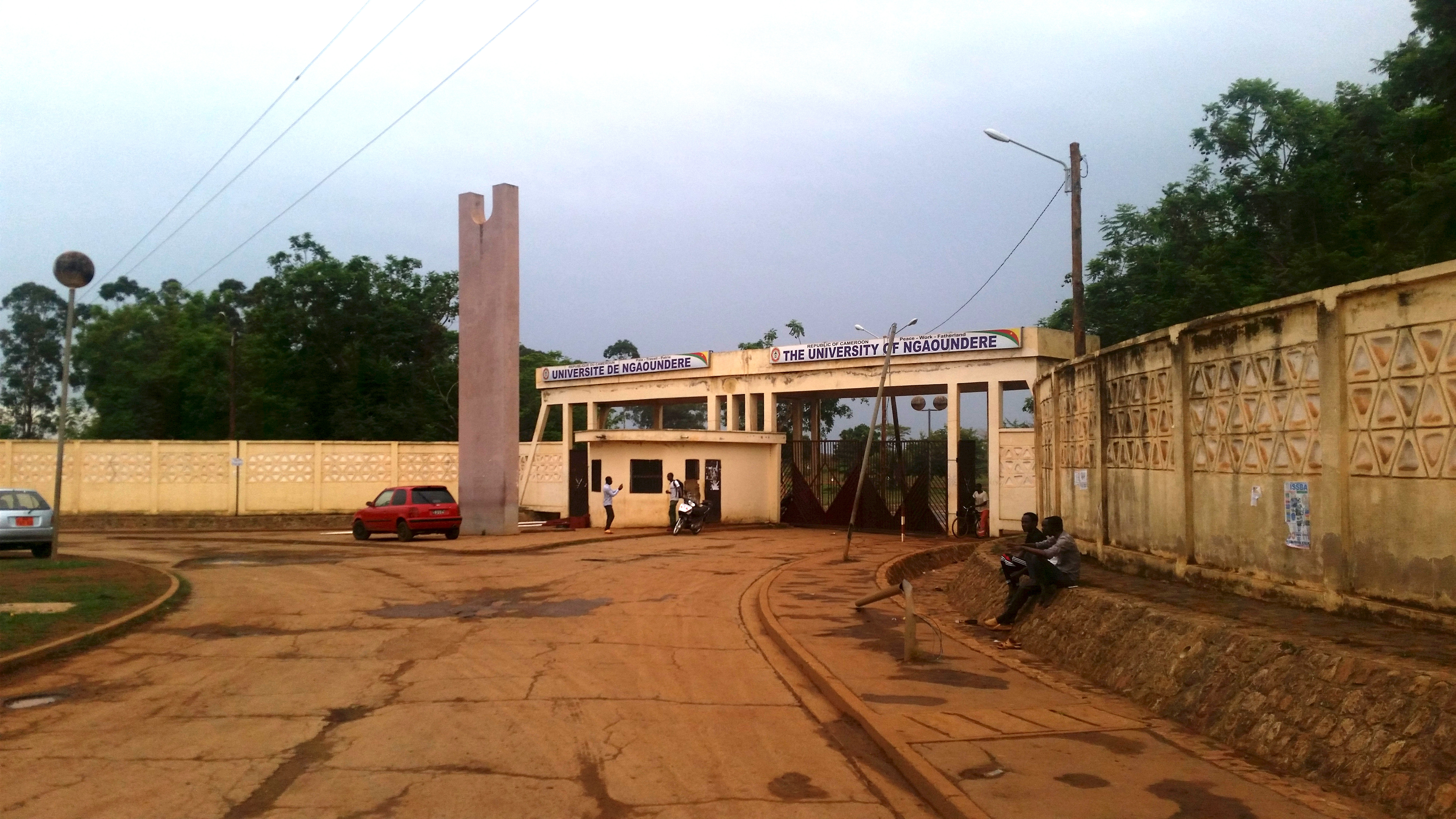
- University of Ngaoundere campus entry
- Established: 19 July 1993; 32 years ago
- Rector: Professor MAMOUDOU ABDOULMOUMINI
- Academic staff: 400
- Students: 30,000
- Location: Ngaoundéré, Adamawa, Cameroon
- Campus: Dang
- Language: French, English
- Website: Official website

The University of Ngaoundéré (French: Université de Ngaoundéré) is a public university located in Ngaoundéré, Adamawa Region in Cameroon. It was established on 19 January 1993 by Presidential decree.

== History ==
The university was created by the Presidential Decree of 19 January 1993 transforming the Ngaoundere University Centre into a statutory State owned university.

Initially made up of two professional schools and four faculties, the institution today has four professional schools and faculties with an estimated 30,000 student population and welcomes students from all regions of Cameroon and neighbouring countries in the sub-region like Chad and the Central African Republic.

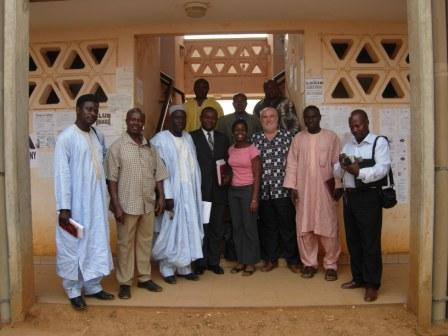
University staff

== Organization ==
The Board of Directors is the supreme body of the university, which ensures the implementation of the development plan of the University as defined by the Council of Higher Education and Scientific and Technical Research and approved by the President of the Republic of Cameroon. The University of Ngaoundéré is guided administratively and academically by a rector, appointed by presidential decree.

The rector chairs the university council, the competent authority in the academic and scientific field. He is assisted at the administrative level by the central government consisting of a secretary-general, three vice-presidents and four administrative units.

== Faculties and schools ==
=== Faculties ===
- Faculty of Arts Letters and Human Sciences
  - English Department
  - Department of Anthropology and Sociology
  - Department of Arts
  - Department of French
  - Department of Geography
  - Department of History
  - Department of Arabic Language and Civilization
  - Department of Linguistics and African languages.
- Faculty of Science
  - Department of Physics
  - Department of Mathematics and Computer Science
  - Department of Biological Sciences
  - Department of Earth (Geological) Sciences
  - Department of Chemistry
  - Department of Environmental Sciences
  - Department of Health Sciences and Biomedical Sciences
  - Department of Sciences and Techniques of Organic Agriculture
  - Department of Renewable Energy
- Faculty of Economic Science and Management
  - Department of Accountancy and Finance;
  - Department of Management, Strategy and Forecasting;
  - Department of Marketing;
  - Department of Monetary and Banking Economics.
- Faculty of Law and Political Sciences
  - Department of Public Law;
  - Department of Private Law;
  - Department of the Legal Theory and Epistemology
- Faculty of Medicine and Biomedical Sciences

=== Schools ===
- School of Geology and Mining Engineering
- National School of Agro-Industrial Sciences
- School of Science and Veterinary Medicine
- School of Chemical Engineering and Mineral Industries
- University Institute of Technology
