= Zambia Forestry College =

Coordinates: 12.85517°S 28.35642°E

Zambia Forestry College (ZFC)
- Type: Government
- Established: 1949
- Location: Kitwe, Zambia
- Campus: Urban

The Zambia Forestry College (ZFC) is a government-run educational institution in Kitwe, Zambia, providing training in environmental sciences and natural resource management. The college is well known for its apiaries and training for beekeepers.

== History ==
It was established in 1949 to provide technical training in forestry. In the same year, it produced the first forest guards.

In the following year, Forest Rangers were trained. The college has since been growing to cope with the changing demand for natural resource trained staff. By 1963, over 300 Forest Rangers (Certificate holders) and Forest Guards had been trained.

Training for Foresters (Diploma holders) commenced in 1963 with nine students. By the end of 1977, 131 male Foresters and one female Forester completed their training. The college has now been upgraded with equipment, facilities and staff.

The Government strive to Improve Expertise and Technical Knowledge a School of Natural Resources was formed at the Copperbelt University

In 1995, the School of Natural Resources started operating as one of the Schools of the Copperbelt University to offer degree programmes in Agroforestry, Fisheries and Aquaculture, Forestry, Wildlife Management and, Wood Science and Technology.

In 1996, the first student intake was enrolled for the Bachelor of Science Degree in Forestry only. Other degree programmes were later introduced as follows; - Wood Science and Technology in 2002, Agroforestry in 2006, Wildlife Management; Fisheries and Aquaculture in 2009 and Bioenergy Science, Plant and Environmental Sciences as well as Sustainable Natural Resource Management and Climate Change in 2016.

== Programs ==
In 2011 Post Graduate programs were introduced and these are M.Sc. degree in Natural Resource Management, M.Sc. degree in Sustainable Agriculture production and a PhD. in Natural Resources.

The school offers teaching, research and consultancy services in agriculture, environment and natural resources management related fields. The school is also engaged in issues of environmental management and development. It has participated and continues to participate at both national and international levels in issues of climate change, biodiversity conservation, carbon trading, ecotourism and management of natural resources for socio-economic development.
