= Mogadishu University =

University in Mogadishu, Somalia

Mogadishu University; جامعة مقديشو; (Jaamacadda Muqdisho)
- Motto in English: "Towards a Better Future"
- Type: Private
- Established: 1997; 29 years ago
- Affiliations: AAU; AARU; FUIW
- Faculty: 11 faculties
- Location: Via Lenin, Mogadishu, Somalia
- Campus: 6 Different Campuses in Mogadishu
- Colours: Yellow & Black
- Website: mu.edu.so

Mogadishu University (Arabic: جامعة مقديشو, Somali: Jaamacadda Muqdisho) is an accredited non-state university in Mogadishu, Somalia.

== Admission ==
The university accepts students who have graduated from secondary schools or those who have GCE equivalent certificates. Before enrollment, students have to pass a qualifying examinations (oral and written) in order to enroll in their program of study.

== Institutes and centers ==
University institutes and centers are:

- The Institute for Somali Studies (ISOS)
- Institute of Peace and Environment
- The Institute of Languages
- The Center for Community Services and Continuing Education
- MU Legal Clinic
- Somali Center for Water & Environment
- Mother & Child Educational Care (MCEC)
- Media Training Center (MTC)
- Research Unit
- MU-IRB
- Radio Himilo

== Faculties of health science ==
The university has nine faculties, which award BA and B.Sc degrees. The university's faculties are:

- Faculty of Sharia and Law
- Faculty of Education and Humanities
- Faculty of Economics & Management Sciences
- Faculty of Health Sciences
- Faculty of Computer Science & Information Technology
- Faculty of Political Sciences & Public Administration
- Faculty of Engineering
- Faculty of Medicine
- Faculty of Agriculture
- Faculty of Veterinary
- Faculty of Dentistry

== Post-graduate Program ==
MU offers its own post-graduate programs as well as in conjunction with the Omdurman Islamic University in Sudan, Malaysia Open University and Asian e-University.

== Accreditation ==
Mogadishu University has accreditation with:

- Minister of Education, Culture and Higher Education
- The Board of the Intergovernmental Organization EDU.

== See also ==
- List of Islamic educational institutions
