= University of Somalia =

Private university in Mogadishu, Somalia

- Motto: A brighter future
- Established: 2005; 21 years ago
- Vice-Chancellor: Hassan Mohamed Sayid
- Students: 11,000
- Location: Mogadishu, Somalia; 2.034°N 45.308°E
- Campus: Urban, near KM4
- Colors: Green
- Website: www.uniso.edu.so

The University of Somalia (UNISO) (Somali: Jaamacada Soomaaliya, Arabic: جامعة الصومال) is a private university in Mogadishu, Somalia.

== Overview ==
The institution was founded in 2005 by a group of independent scholars. It is headquartered in downtown Mogadishu, and also has a branch in El-sha Biyaha.

As of 2014, the university provides higher instruction to a student body of 6,000 pupils. It is a co-educational institution.

== Colleges ==
University of Somalia has six colleges:

- College of Health Science
- College of Business administration
- College of Engineering and Computer
- College of Education and Social Science
- College of Sharea and Law
- College of agroveterinary science

== Medical ==
Facilities operated by the university include:

- Networking labs
- Programming labs
- Medical labs
- Libraries
- Teaching hospitals
- Printing services
- Internet

== Postgraduate ==
It has also Postgraduate Department which provides the following programs

- Master of Business Administration (MBA)
- Master of Leadership and governance
- Master of Computer Systems
- Master of Public Health
- Master of Anatomy
- Master of Physiology
- Master of Pathology

== See also ==
- List of Islamic educational institutions
