= University of Hargeisa =

University in Somaliland

- Jaamacadda Hargeysa
- Other names: جامعة هرجيسا
- Motto: Towards a better future; Knowledge is Light
- Type: Public
- Established: September 27, 2000; 25 years ago
- President: Mohamed Ahmed Sulub, PhD
- Students: 7000 (approx.)
- Location: Hargeisa, Maroodi Jeex, Republic of Somaliland; 9.546°N 44.0472°E
- Campus: Urban, 494 acres (2.00 km^{2})
- Colors: Blue and red
- Website: www.uoh-edu.net

The University of Hargeisa (Somali: Jaamacadda Hargeysa, Arabic: جامعة هرجيسا, abbreviated UoH) The University of Hargeisa was founded by Hon. Fawzia Yusuf H. Adam in 2000, and she was the first Chancellor between 2000 - 2006. It is the leading and largest higher education institution in the country and provides a wide range of undergraduate and postgraduate courses in different fields.

== History ==
The institution was founded in 1998 by Fawzia Yusuf H. Adam. Fawzia Yusuf H. Adam is the founder of the University of Hargeisa, which was established in between 1998 - 2000. Fawzia is the First woman Deputy Prime Minister of Somalia, first woman Minister of Foreign Affairs of Somalia, and also an advocate for women's rights. She is an influential leader in Somali politics and communities. In early 2024, she was nominated by Somalia to run for the African Union Commission Chairperson position.

Since its establishment, the university has collaborated with many academic and international partners in different capacities, including UCL, King's College, Harvard University, UCSI, International University of Africa, and other local universities in the horn of Africa.

== Leadership ==
The current president of the university is Dr. Mohamed Ahmed Sulub, who holds a PhD in Organizational Management and Development from the Universiti Malaysia Terengganu in Malaysia. The university had previously been led by some of the other well-known Somali scholars, including Professor Hussein A. Bulhan, a graduate of Harvard University.

== Students ==
The university has over 7,000 students and operates on a four to six years system.

== Notable alumni ==
Notable alumni include the former president of Somaliland Muse Bihi Abdi and the first National Deputy Prosecutor in Somaliland Khadra Hussein Mohammad.

The university has also an annual honorary doctorate award to outstanding members of society, the first of which was awarded to Abdi Waraabe.

== Schools and colleges ==
The university consists of 14 different colleges, schools and institutes, which offer different undergraduate and postgraduate programs:

- College of Agri & Veterinary Medicine
- College of Applied & Natural Science
- College of Business & Public Administration
- College of Education
- College of Engineering
- College of Computing & IT
- College of Law
- College of Medicine & Health Science
- College of Social Science & Humanities
- College of Islamic Studies & Arabic Language
- Hargeisa School of Economics
- School of Graduate Studies
- Institute for Peace & Conflict Studies
- Gaariye Institute of Somali Studies and Literature Studies

== Postgraduate programs ==
The university offers postgraduate programs, including postgraduate diploma and master's, in the following areas:

International Relations and Diplomacy	Duration: 2 years
Governance and Leadership	Duration: 2 years
Development Studies	Duration: 2 years
Project Planning and Management	Duration: 2 years
Public Health and Nutrition	Duration: 2 years
Educational Leadership & Mgt	Duration: 2 years
Reproductive Health	Duration: 2 years
Ophthalmology	Duration: 2 years

== Institute for Peace & Conflict Studies ==
The Institute for Peace and Conflict Studies (IPCS) was established in February 2008.

Graduates include Abdirahman Aw Ali Farrah, former vice president of Somaliland; Musa Bihi Abdi, current president of the Republic of Somaliland and chairman of the ruling party Kulmiye; and Abdirahman Mohamed Abdilahi, former speaker of the Somaliland House of Representatives and the chairman of Waddani Party.

The IPCS offers two locally reputable master's degrees: a Master of Arts in Peace and Conflict Studies and a Master of Arts in Education, Conflict & Peace Building.

== College of Medicine & Health Science ==
The College of Medicine & Health Science is part of the university.

== Teaching staff ==
The university has a wide number of academics in all its faculties. Around 60 percent of the staff were PhD and master's holders in the academic year 2017/2018.

Academic year, 2017/2018
#	College name	PhD	MA/MSc	BA/BSc	Total
1	IPCS/SPGS	23	11	0	34
2	Agr/Vet	3	18	7	28
3	ICT	2	11	15	28
4	Engineering	1	17	24	42
5	Law	0	15	6	51
6	BA	2	15	8	25
7	Economics	0	16	2	18
8	Medicine	2	23	22	47
9	App. Science	2	32	35	69
10	Islamic Stud.	1	10	7	18
11	Education	2	3	24	29
12	Social Work	0	9	2	11
Total		38	180	152	370
