= Indian Ocean University =

University in Somalia

- Jaamacadda Badweynta Hindiya
- Motto: Educating Tomorrow's Leaders
- Type: Private – Research
- Established: 1993; 32 years ago
- President: Samawade Moh'ed Ali-Dahir
- Provost: Abdulkadir Mohamud Mohamed
- Location: Mogadishu, Somalia
- Campus: KM 4, Wadada Garoonka Diyaaradaha
- Language: English
- Website: http://www.iou.edu.so

Indian Ocean University, known as IOU or Jaamacadda Bedweynta Hindiya, is the oldest private, nonprofit provider of accredited University education in Somalia, located in the city of Mogadishu. It was established in 1993 and is registered as a higher education institution under the Ministry of Higher Education and Culture.

== History ==
The 1991 civil war in Somalia caused collapse of all of the institutions in Somalia, including the only government-run university, Somali National University. Without a functional central government in Somalia, and its capacity to provide key public goods and services to its citizens, a group of Somali intellectuals got together on May 3, 1993 to establish Indian Ocean University. Its dedicated campus is on the airport road in KM4 square, about 1 kilometer (0.6 miles) from Aden Adde International Airport.

The first batch of students started in September 1993, studying limited academic disciplines like Business Administration and Nursing.

As of 2015, Samawade Ali-Dahir was the president.
