= Admas University College–Hargeisa =

University in Hargeisa, Somaliland

Coordinates: 9.578507713648722°N 44.03176812765892°E

Admas University–Hargeisa
- Motto: Works for Ethiopia
- Type: Private; Research
- Established: September 2006
- Founder: Tesfaye Zewge
- Chairman: Tesfaye Zewge
- President: Hussein Abdillahi Mohamoud
- Location: Hargeisa, Somaliland
- Colors
- Website: www.admasuniversity.com//

Admas University College–Hargeisa is a private research university located in Hargeisa, Somaliland not somalia , and one of campuses of Admas University outside Ethiopia. The other campus is located in Garowe, Puntland, Somalia.

== Overview ==
Admas University commenced its in Hargeisa, Somaliland, in September 2006 as the first private Higher Education Institution in Somaliland on the basis of two legally binding Memoranda of Understanding. The first was drawn by and between the Ministries of Education of the two neighboring Horn of Africa Countries: Ethiopia and Somaliland, while the second one was drawn by and between the owners and operators of the respective institutions: Admas University, Ethiopia and Admas University, Hargeisa.

Initially, Admas University, Hargeisa, started serving the society with a small intake of about 150 students in four fields of studies in undergraduate degree programs namely, Information and Communication Technology (ICT), Accounting, Economics, and Management. The university then exhibited a tremendous growth and expansion in the following years to over 3,000 students attending their studies both at undergraduate and postgraduate levels in its five nearby campuses.

Throughout its existence the University has produced more than 7,000 graduates in various bachelor's and master's degrees as well as postgraduate diploma programs. Graduates are now holding key positions in Somaliland's private, public and nongovernment sectors which enabled the university to highly contribute to the country's social and economic development.

All the offered eleven undergraduate and seven postgraduate programs are recognized and accredited by Somaliland's National Commission for Higher Education as well as Federal Democratic of Ethiopia's Education and Training Authority (ETA), which was formerly known as Higher Education Relevance and Quality Agency (HERQA).

The University has also ran joint academic postgraduate programs in collaboration with certain foreign universities in addition to facilitating scholarship opportunities for great number of Somalilanders to support their career development.
