= Somaliland University of Technology =

Technology university in Hargeisa, Somaliland

Somaliland University of Technology (SUTECH)
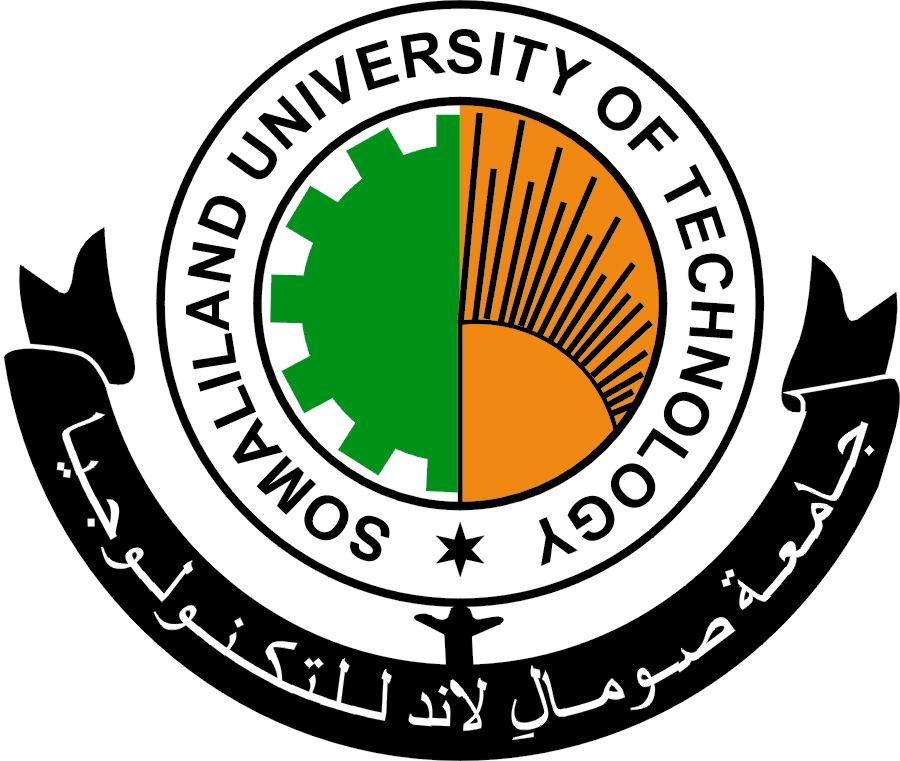
- Former names: Hargeisa College of Applied Arts & Technology
- Type: Private
- Established: 2000 (gained university status in 2007)
- President: Dr. Saeed Sheikh Mohamed
- Location: Berbera Road, Geed Habeeya, Hargeisa, Woqooyi Galbeed, Somaliland
- Campus: 20 hectares (49 acres)
- Colours: Green and orange
- Website: somalilanduniversity.org

The Somaliland University of Technology (SUTECH) (Somali: Jaamacadda Teknoolajiyadda Somaliland) is a tertiary academic institution located in Hargeisa, Woqooyi Galbeed, Somaliland.

== Overview ==
The university was founded in 2000 as a small non-profit educational institution by Dr. Saeed Sheikh Mohamed. It was formerly known as the Hargeisa College of Applied Arts & Technology (CAAT). The CAAT was an approved center of City & Guilds and Edexcel.

The Somaliland University of Technology is situated in a campus of 20 hectares donated by Dr. Mohamed. Building construction was funded by the Islamic Development Bank based in Jeddah, Saudi Arabia and opened in 2007.

The university has two partnership agreements with the University of Khartoum and Ahfad University for women in Sudan.

The Somaliland University of Technology signed an agreements of cooperation with three African universities. The four universities agreed to work together as full partners within the framework of Intra-ACP Academic EU Funded Program. The main objective of the program is to develop and/or enhance the graduate studies programs of each university (Master's degree and PhD), and to exchange staff, faculties, and students.

== Faculties and institutes ==
The university consists of the following faculties and institutes:

- Faculty of Engineering and Architecture
- Institute of Global Studies
- Faculty of ICT & Computer Sciences
- Faculty of Economics and Business Administration
- Faculty of Allied Sciences
- Faculty of Natural Sciences
- Faculty of Environment Studies
- Faculty of Social Sciences
- Hargeisa College of Vocational Training & Alternative Studies:
  - Accounting Technician Program
  - Office Management
  - Computer Skills
  - Agriculture Extension
  - Women Empowerment

There are two independent centers which work closely with different faculties:

- School of Foreign Languages
- High school diploma program
