= Puntland State University =

University in Somalia

- Former name: Garowe School of Management
- Motto: PSU is an Agent of Change
- Type: Public
- Established: 2004; 22 years ago
- Vice-Chancellor: Mahamud Hamid Mohamed
- Academic staff: Over 60
- Students: Over 1000
- Location: Garowe, Puntland, Somalia
- Campus: Garowe Main Campus, Galkacyo Campus, Bosaso Campus
- Website: Official website

Puntland State University is a public university in Garowe, Puntland, Somalia.

== History ==
The school traces its roots back to the Garowe School of Management, a women's school in Garowe offering courses in accounting, computer skills, business English and business management. After a year of operation, which saw the graduation of 60 women, the school was expanded to a two-year structure and renamed to Puntland Community College. In 2004, in cooperation with the United Nations Development Program and USIU Nairobi, PCC was expanded to include four-year programs. It was also renamed Puntland State University (PSU).

== Degrees ==
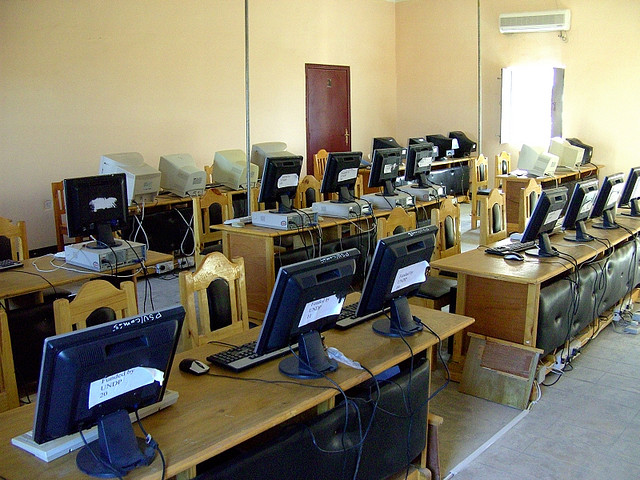
A computer classroom in Puntland State University.

Degrees offered at PSU include:

- Bachelor of Science in Business Administration (BBA): two- and four-year programs
- Bachelor of Science
  - Information technology
  - Public administration
  - Journalism
  - English language
  - Sharia and Law

The school is participating in the Puntland Resource and Service Center, which began construction in January 2007 in Garowe.

== Faculties ==
- Faculty of Business and Economics
- Faculty of Social Science
- Faculty of Computer Science
- Faculty of Health Sciences
- Faculty of Shari'a and Law

== Partnership ==
Puntland State University has entered into a sister institution relationship with the Minneapolis Community and Technical College (MCTC) based in Minneapolis, Minnesota in the United States.
