= Sudanese Armed Forces =

Combined military forces of Sudan

- القوات المسلحة السودانية
- Insignia of the Sudanese Armed Forces
- Founded: 1925; 101 years ago (as Sudan Defence Force)
- Current form: 1956; 70 years ago
- Service branches: Sudanese Army; Sudanese Navy; Sudanese Air Force; Republican Guard
- Headquarters: Khartoum

Leadership
- Supreme Commander: Transitional Sovereignty Council
- Commander-in-Chief: General Abdel Fattah al-Burhan
- Minister of Defence: Hassan Daoud Kayan
- Chief of Staff: Yasser al-Atta

Personnel
- Military age: 18
- Active personnel: 300,000
- Reserve personnel: 200,000

Expenditure
- Budget: $2.47 Billion (2017 est.)
- Percent of GDP: 1.0% (2017 est.)

Industry
- Domestic suppliers: Military Industry Corporation
- Foreign suppliers: China; Czech Republic; Iran; North Korea; Russia; Turkey; Pakistan

Related articles
- History: Military history of Sudan: World War II; First Sudanese Civil War; Second Sudanese Civil War; War in Darfur; Sudanese conflict in South Kordofan and Blue Nile; Heglig Crisis; Yemeni civil war; Saudi Arabian–led intervention in Yemen; 2019 Sudanese coup d'état; Al-Fashaga conflict; 2021 Sudanese coup d'état; Sudanese civil war (2023–present)
- Ranks: Military ranks of Sudan

The Sudanese Armed Forces (SAF; Arabic: القوات المسلحة السودانية, romanized: Al-Qūwāt Al-Musallaḥah as-Sūdāniyah) are the military forces of the Republic of the Sudan. The force strength has been estimated at 109,300 personnel in 2011 (by IISS), 200,000 personnel before the current war in Sudan broke out in 2023 (by the CIA), and 300,000 personnel in 2024 (by Al Jazeera). (Note: Does not count the reserve forces and paramilitaries)

As of 2026, the SAF and Rapid Support Forces (RSF) remain in armed conflict against one another in the ongoing civil war in Sudan. In 2016–2017, the RSF had 40,000 members participating in the Yemeni Civil War (of which 10,000 returned to Sudan by October 2019).

== History ==
The origins of the Sudanese army are traced to southern Sudanese battalions recruited by the British during the reconquest of Sudan in 1898, and later to Sudanese auxiliary units in the Egyptian Army known as al-Awtirah. After the assassination of Sir Lee Stack in Cairo in 1924, Britain removed Egyptian forces from Sudan and created the Sudan Defence Force in January 1925 under Lewa Huddleston Pasha, with about 140 British officers transferred from the Egyptian Army.

The British Army organized the SDF into local auxiliary regiments, including northern units recruited from local Arab, Beja, and Nubian soldiers, while the southern Equatoria Corps drew from local Nilotic peoples. During the Second World War, the SDF served with Allied forces in Ethiopia and the Western Desert Campaign, including operations around Kufra and Jalo in the Libyan Desert. In 1947, Sudanese military schools were closed and troop numbers were reduced to 7,570.

In the 1948 Arab–Israeli War, Colonel Hamid Saleh al-Malik selected 250 Sudanese soldiers, many of whom had combat experience from World War II, to serve with the Egyptian Army. After arriving in Cairo for a parade, the Sudanese troops were distributed among different Egyptian units, a decision later criticized for weakening the cohesion of soldiers who had previously fought together. Forty-three Sudanese soldiers were killed in action during the war.

In 1953, the British and Egyptian authorities agreed to place Sudan on the path toward independence. General Ahmed Mohammed became Sudan's first army chief in August 1954, marking the first time the Sudanese army had an independent command not governed by either Britain or Egypt.

In July 1951, Maj Gen Lashmer Whistler, then Commandant of the Sudan Defence Force, wrote in the British Army Review that the SDF comprised four infantry/camel units, a signals regiment, an anti-aircraft artillery regiment and other units. By March 1954, British forces in Sudan had been reduced to one battalion in Khartoum, under the Governor-General's military commander, who also served as Commandant of the SDF. From 1950, this post was held by Major General Reginald "Cully" Scoons. The last British unit, the 1st Battalion Royal Leicestershire Regiment, left Sudan on 16 August 1955, and all British troops had departed by the end of that month.

On 18 August 1955, shortly before Sudanese independence, No. 2 Company of the Equatoria Corps mutinied at Torit after being ordered to transfer north for the ceremonies of the departure of British troops. The mutiny spread among other southern soldiers in Juba, Yei, Yombo, and Maridi. Northern troops were airlifted to suppress the revolt, and by the end of the month the Equatoria Corps had been dismantled as an effective formation. The Torit mutiny marked the start of South Sudanese wars of independence, the emergence of the Anyanya movement and the beginning of the First Sudanese Civil War.

=== Independence ===
Following the 1954 Torit mutiny, the Northern forces increased their numbers by recalling World War II veterans and launching new recruitment drives.

Although regarded as competent at 1956 independence, the army's character changed as officers had already begun considering political involvement. Numbers began expanding before independence, reaching 12,000 personnel by 1959, and leveled off at nearly 50,000 in 1972. After independence, the military -particularly the educated officer corps- became more and more politically involved; soldiers associated themselves with parties and movements across the political spectrum." On November 17, 1958, the army's two senior generals, Major General Ibrahim Abboud, the armed forces commander, and Ahmad Abd al Wahab, seized power in a military coup. "The coup in the Sudan, far from being a take-over.. by the army, was a hand-over to the army. It was a coup by courtesy.. in response to the demand for emergency measures.." by the head of the government, Abdallah Khalil.

The First Sudanese Civil War broke out in a series of actions in the south in late 1963 and early 1964. Attacks on police posts and convoys began in September 1963, and the higher-profile early attack on the Armed Forces came in January 1964, when rebels attacked the barracks at Wau, Sudan. President Abboud was forced to step down following demonstrations which began in mid-1964.

In 1969, the 26,500-strong Sudanese Army comprised four infantry brigades, three independent battalions, two armoured regiments, one parachute regiment, and three artillery regiments. After independence, British advisers helped train the Army and Air Force, and British equipment predominated in the ground forces. There were 50 Alvis Saladins, 60 Ferret armoured cars, and 45 Commando armoured cars, about 50 25-pounders, 40 105-mm howitzers, 20 120-mm mortars, and 80 Bofors 40-mm guns.

On 25 May 1969, Colonel Jaafar Nimeiry led a military coup. A factional military government, the National Revolutionary Command Council, ruled until 1971 when Nimeiri transitioned to a civilian-based government. The first civil war ended via a negotiated settlement in 1973 by General Ismail. Sudan sent a reinforcement brigade to Egypt for the 1973 Yom Kippur War, but it arrived too late on 28 October and saw no action.

Following the June 1967 Arab–Israeli War, Sudan severed Western relations and established close military cooperation with the Soviet Union. This Soviet assistance coincided with the Sudan Armed Forces expanding from 18,000 personnel in 1966 to nearly 50,000 by 1972. Consequently, Soviet-manufactured tanks, artillery, and MiG combat aircraft formed the bulk of Sudan's ground and air equipment from the 1970s until the early 1980s.

The Second Sudanese Civil War broke out again in 1983 and continued until 2005. The Armed Forces operated under the authority of the People's Armed Forces Act 1986.

=== Al-Bashir era ===
By the time of the 1989 Sudanese coup d'état, reports claimed that soldiers and non-commissioned officers from southern Sudan made up more than half of many army units. It characterized many of these troops as motivated largely by pay and rations rather than loyalty to the government, while noting that they could fight effectively but were often reluctant to undertake offensive operations. The new government established the Popular Defence Forces under the Popular Defence Act of October 1989 as a paramilitary body aligned with the political objectives of the government and the National Islamic Front. The majority of these forces were recruited from the northern regions of the country.

The Land Forces were "basically a light infantry force in 1991, supported by specialized elements. ... [C]ontrol extended from the headquarters of the general staff in Khartoum to the six regional commands (central, eastern, western, northern, southern, and Khartoum). Each regional command was organized along divisional lines. Thus, the Fifth Division was at al-Ubayyid in Kurdufan (Central Command), the Second Division was at Khashm El Girba (Eastern Command), the Sixth Division was assigned to al-Fashir in Darfur (Western Command), the First Division was at Juba (Southern Command), and the Seventh Armoured Division was at As Shajarah just south of Khartoum (Khartoum Command). The Airborne Division was based at Khartoum International Airport. The Third Division was located in the north, although no major troop units were assigned to it. Each division had a liaison officer attached to general headquarters in Khartoum to facilitate the division's communication with various command elements. This organisational structure did not provide an accurate picture of actual troop deployments. All of the divisions were understrength. The Sixth Division in Darfur was a reorganised brigade with only 2,500 personnel. Unit strengths varied widely. Most brigades were composed of 1,000 to 1,500 troops." Keegan, writing in 1983, indicated that the northern command was located at Shendi.

To reduce the pressure on the regular armed forces, the Sudanese government made extensive use of militias, such as the South Sudan Defence Forces. This largely symbolic coalition of seven groups was formed with the signing of the Khartoum Peace Agreement with the NIF in 1997. The SSDF was led by former Garang lieutenant Riek Machar.

In 2004, the Federal Research Division of the Library of Congress estimated that the Popular Defence Forces, the military wing of the National Islamic Front, consisted of 10,000 active members, with 85,000 reserves. The Popular Defence Forces were deployed alongside regular army units against various rebel groups. In 2005, in accordance with the provisions of the Naivasha Comprehensive Peace Accord, Joint Integrated Units were formed together with the rebels of the Sudan People's Liberation Army. In this regard, Afdevinfo did report that the 1st Division at Juba had been disbanded.

Flag of the 9th Airborne Division

In 2007 the IISS estimated that the SAF had 104,800 personnel supported by 17,500 paramilitary personnel. Jane's Information Group said in May 2009 that 'There are a number of infantry divisions, divided among [the six] regional commands. The commander of each military region traditionally commanded the divisional and brigade commanders within his territory. It is understood that there are six infantry divisions and seven independent infantry brigades; a mechanised division and an independent mechanised infantry brigade; and an armoured division. Other elements are understood to include a Special Forces battalion with five companies; an airborne division and a border guard brigade. Support elements include an engineer division.' Jane's reported the army's strength as 100,000 plus militias.

Jane's Sentinel reports that there are two engineer brigades supporting the 9th Airborne Division. Jane's Amphibious and Special Forces, 2010, listed the 9th Airborne Division headquartered in Khartoum which includes two airborne brigades and the 144th Special Forces Battalion, an anti-terrorist unit. It also mentioned the two engineer brigades for special forces support. The 9th Airborne Division carried out projects north of the capital in 2022; in January 2022 it confronted demonstrators in Omdurman. In 2010 it was reported that a Republican Guard existed as a presidential security unit, led by Major General Khalid Hamad.

The SAF and government-aligned militias have fought in the Sudanese Civil War, the Darfur Conflict, the Sudan–SPLM-N conflict and the 2012 South Sudan-Sudan border conflict. As part of the Yemeni Civil War, dozens of Sudanese soldiers were reported killed in an ambush by Houthis in Hajjah Governorate in April 2018.

=== Joint Integrated Units (2005–2011) ===
The 2005 Comprehensive Peace Agreement which ended the second civil war, stated that "... there shall be formed Joint/Integrated Units during the Pre-Interim and Interim Period from the SAF and the Sudan People's Liberation Army (SPLA). ... These shall form the nucleus of the future Sudanese National Armed Forces, should the result of the referendum ... confirm unity of the country, [otherwise] the JIUs shall dissolve with each component reverting to its mother Armed Forces."

The Comprehensive Peace Agreement provided for five Joint Integrated Unit infantry divisions, one independent brigade, and a separate infantry battalion for Abyei:

- 1st Infantry Division, with 9,000 officers, NCOs and men, deployed in Equatoria;
- 2nd Infantry Division, with 8,000 officers, NCOs and men, deployed in Upper Nile;
- 3rd Infantry Division, with 7,000 officers, NCOs and men, deployed in Bahr el Ghazal;
- 4th Infantry Division, with 6,000 officers, NCOs and men, deployed in southern Blue Nile;
- 5th Infantry Division, with 6,000 officers, NCOs and men, deployed in Southern Kordofan/Nuba Mountains;
- an Independent Brigade, with 3,000 officers, NCOs and men, deployed in Khartoum;
- a JIU Infantry Battalion for the Abyei Area, attached to the 3rd Infantry Division.

According to the Catholic "Voice of Hope" radio station in Wau, the Salam Forces military of Major-General Eltom Elnur Daldoum, who has a Misseriya background and operated in the Deim Zubeir area, joined the Sudan Armed Forces and became part of the Joint Integrated Units in Wau during the interim period. The number of his fighters was estimated at 400.

After its formation, the Joint Defence Board (JDB) met for the first time in January 2006. The Board was jointly chaired by SAF and SPLA lieutenant generals. The National Assembly passed the Joint Integrated Units Act on 17 January 2006. The JIUs were commanded by SPLA Major General Thomas Cirillo Swaka. But in the face of high hopes, the three most serious breaches of the CPA's permanent ceasefire resulted directly from the actions of JIU battalions and brigades. North/South distrust resulted in the JDB struggling to providing oversight and management of the JIUs.

With the dissolution of the JIUs following the Southern Sudanese independence referendum, 2011, the SPLA components were either integrated back into the SPLA or demobilised. The SPLA components however were seen as less of a concern than the SAF components. Many of the SAF JIU personnel were former militia ('Other Armed Groups' or OAGs) who were 'aligned' rather than being formally 'incorporated' within the Sudanese Army. 'Aside from regular SAF units in locations such as Malakal and Bor, many of the SAF elements of the JIUs hail from the areas where they are serving and have strong family ties in these locations. As with the SPLA components, integration into the SPLA or increased incentives to demobilize are the only options the SAF components are likely to consider—movement north being out of the question.'

=== After al-Bashir's fall (2019–2023) ===
On 11 April 2019, the Sudanese Armed Forces launched a coup against Omar al-Bashir after months of protests against his rule. On 3 June 2019, the Sudanese Armed Forces, led by the Rapid Support Forces carried out the Khartoum massacre, leaving over 128 people dead.

Article 10.(a) of the August 2019 Draft Constitutional Declaration states that the mixed civilian–military "Sovereignty Council is the head of state, the symbol of its sovereignty and unity, and the Supreme Commander of the armed forces, Rapid Support Forces, and other uniformed forces." Article 34.(a) states that the "armed forces and Rapid Support Forces are a national military institution that protect the unity and sovereignty of the nation" and Article 34.(b) states that the relationship between the military institution and executive authority is to be organised by the "Armed Forces Law and the Rapid Support Forces Law".

On 28 October 2019, the chair of the Sovereignty Council, Abdel Fattah al-Burhan, issued a decree appointing a new military top-level command, called the General Staff, including Lt. Gen. Mohamed Osmana al-Hassan as Chief of General Staff; Lt. Gen. Abdallah al-Matari Hamid, Inspector General of the Armed Forces; several Deputy Chiefs of Staff; Lt. Gen. Essam Mohamed-Hassan Karar as commander-in-chief of the land forces; Rear Admiral Mahjoub Bushra Ahmed Rahma as commander of the naval forces; Lt. Gen. Essam al-Din Said Koko as commander-in-chief of the Air Force; and Major General Abdel Khair Abdallah Nasser Darjam as Commander of the Air Defence Forces. Sudan Tribune interpreted the changes in military leadership as a strategy by al-Burhan to "tighten his grip on the army after the removal of Islamist generals."

=== Sudanese Civil War (2023–present) ===
Map of Sudanese Civil War (2023–present) Controlled by Sudanese Armed Forces and allies Controlled by Rapid Support Forces Controlled by SPLM-N (al-Hilu) Controlled by allied Rapid Support Forces and SPLM-N (al-Hilu) Controlled by SLM (al-Nur)

Since the outbreak of the Sudanese Civil War, the armed forces have garnered increasing popular support against the Rapid Support Forces from the Sudanese population, even from the staunchest critics of the military. The conflict has also deepened the SAF's reliance on Islamist networks, which have mobilized civilians through popular resistance brigades. The al-Bara' ibn Malik Battalion in particular has been supporting the SAF on the Khartoum front lines. Despite General Burhan's repudiations, reports indicate that upwards of 75% of the SAF consists of Muslim Brotherhood aligned elements.

Since April 2023, the Sudanese Armed Forces have shifted from conventional operations to a decentralized strategy, utilizing artillery, siege warfare, and UAVs to prioritize territory denial over control against mobile paramilitary forces.

To offset personnel losses, the SAF integrated paramilitaries and local committees into a "two-tiered" force. This combination of degraded professional units and undisciplined militias has complicated unified command and control.

Despite Omar al-Bashir’s 2019 ouster, his networks retain influence within Sudan’s security institutions. Reuters reports that thousands of Bashir-linked Islamist operatives are fighting alongside the army, though the military denies any political affiliations. ACLED later reported that the Al-Bara' ibn Malik Battalion drew on former Popular Defence Forces and intelligence-service networks and used ties with SAF commanders to integrate into military ranks after the outbreak of war. In 2025, the U.S. Treasury sanctioned the Al-Baraa Bin Malik Brigade and the Justice and Equality Movement leader Jibril Ibrahim, describing them as Sudanese Islamist actors involved in the war and linking the brigade to the former Popular Defence Forces.

In April 2023, several Islamists escaped from Kober prison, including Ahmed Haroun, who had been indicted by the International Criminal Court (ICC) for war crimes and crimes against humanity; Ali Osman Taha. Haroun claimed that their escape was aided by prison guards and the SAF. Suliman Baldo, founder of the think tank Sudan Transparency and Policy Tracker, commented that the prison escape empowers the Islamists to manipulate the conflict. The Islamist leader Haroun called on the population to support the SAF in their fight against the RSF.

Despite its anti-Islamist claims, the RSF includes former Bashir-era Islamist figures like Hassabu Mohamed Abdelrahman. The U.S. Treasury also sanctioned former Bashir aide Taha Osman Ahmed al-Hussein, stating that he had played a pivotal role in managing the RSF's relationship with regional actors to advance its war effort.

A 2016 Amnesty International report documented approximately 30 suspected chemical weapons attacks in Darfur’s Jebel Marra under Omar al-Bashir, killing an estimated 200–250 people, including many children.

In May 2025, the U.S. sanctioned SAF leadership, including Abdel Fattah al-Burhan, after determining the SAF used chemical weapons in 2024 during its conflict with the RSF.

On 6 May 2025, Sudan cut ties with the UAE, declaring it a “state of aggression” following East Sudan drone attacks. Sudan accused the UAE of arming the RSF and committing aggression for over two years. Sudan’s Defense Minister Yassin Ibrahim said they were also withdrawing the Sudanese embassy and consulate general from the Emirates.

== Education and training ==
The Military Academy at Wadi Seidna, near Omdurman, had been Sudan's primary source of officer training since it opened in 1948. A two-year program, emphasizing study in political and military science and physical training, led to a commission as a second lieutenant in the SAF. In the late 1970s and early 1980s, an average of 120 to 150 officers were graduated from the academy each year. In the late 1950s, roughly 60 graduated each year, peaking to more than 500 in early 1972 as a result of mobilisation brought on by the first southern rebellion. Students from other Arab and African countries were also trained at the Military College, and in 1982 sixty Ugandans were graduated as part of a Sudanese contribution to rebuilding the Ugandan army after Amin's removal from power.

== Equipment ==
The Sudanese Armed Forces today are equipped mainly with Soviet, Russian, Chinese, Ukrainian, and Sudanese manufactured weaponry. They have a weapons production company called the Military Industry Corporation. Significant data has been made available by the UN Experts' Groups on the Sudan on arms supplies to Sudanese forces.

Flag of the Sudanese Army

The proliferation of small arms in Sudan originated during the occupation of the country by Ottoman and Egyptian forces and by the colonial powers, especially Britain and France, in the late nineteenth and early twentieth centuries. Sudan had only a limited arms industry until the late 1990s, except for a production line for small-caliber ammunition. Consequently, foreign sources for weapons, equipment, ammunition, and technical training have been indispensable. The standard issue battle rifle is now an H&K G3 variant that is domestically manufactured by Military Industry Corporation and referred to as the Dinar.

The IISS reported in 2007 that the SAF had 200 T-54/55 main battle tanks and 70 Type 62 light tanks. By 2011 the total that the IISS listed was 360: 20 M-60, 60 Type 59, 270 T-54/55, and 10 'Al Bashier' (Type-85-IIM). The 'Al-Bashier' is a licensed version of the Type 85M-II tank. In addition, the 'Digna'a modernisation programme for the T-55 has been reported. Chinese Type 96 tanks have also been known to serve in the Sudanese Army. These are by far and away Sudan's most modern and powerful tanks.

The IISS reported 218 armoured cars (6 French Panhard AML-90, 60 BRDM-2, 80 British Ferret, and 30 British Alvis Saladin) in 2007, alongside 15 Soviet BMP-2. Also reported were 42 US M-113, 19 US LAV-150/V-100 Commando, Soviet BTR-152/BTR-50, 20 Czech or Polish OT-62/OT-64. 104 Egyptian Walid were ordered in 1981–1986.

The IISS estimated in 2011 that Sudan had 778+ artillery pieces, including 20 US M-101, 16 D-30, Soviet D-74, Soviet M-30, and 75 Soviet 130mm M-46/Type-59-I. The IISS estimated in 2011 that the Army had 20 pieces of self-propelled artillery, including 10 Soviet 2S1 Gvozdika and 10 French (AMX) Mk F3. Multiple rocket launchers in service include the Soviet 122mm BM-21 Grad and the Chinese PHL-81.

Also reported in 2013 were Soviet M43 mortars (120mm). Anti-tank and anti-aircraft weapons reported included a number of British-made Swingfire, 54 Soviet 9K32 Strela-2 (SA-7 Grail), and a large number of various anti-aircraft guns.

Open-source inventories published after the outbreak of the 2023 Sudan war listed Sudanese equipment including T-72 operators and variants main battle tanks, FB-6A mobile air-defence systems (a motorized adaptation of the shoulder-fired FN-6), 9K33 Osa/SA-8 mobile surface-to-air missile systems, and WS-1B and WS-2B multiple rocket launcher systems. During the war, additional reports described continued Sudanese Armed Forces use of T-72Z/Al-Zubair I tanks in 2025 and a growing operational emphasis on drones and air-defence systems in 2026.

By May 2026, reports from the conflict described intensified use of drones and counter-drone air-defence operations, including Sudanese army drone strikes against RSF positions in Nyala and the reported interception of a long-range RSF drone over White Nile state.

Armored vehicles are produced, maintained, and repaired at the Elshaheed Ibrahim Shams el Deen Complex in Khartoum.

== Air Force ==
The Sudanese Air Force operates Mil Mi-24 attack helicopters, Karakuram K-8 training aircraft, MiG-29, MiG-23 and MiG-21 fighters, Su-25, Su-24, F-5, and Nanchang Q-5 'Fantan' fighter-attack aircraft and much more. Soon after agreeing in November 1976 to provide Sudan with selected arms, the United States sold Sudan transport aircraft, a purchase financed by Saudi Arabia, followed several years later by F-5 combat aircraft.

A long-established training center and airbase is at Wadi Sayyidna, where No. 2 Fighter-Attack Squadron SuAF operated J-7s for a period.

The Sudanese Armed Forces have lost senior personnel in several fatal aviation incidents. In April 2001, a military aircraft carrying senior army officers crashed at Adar Yill in Upper Nile, killing 15 people, including State Defence Minister Col. Ibrahim Shams al-Din. In August 2012, an Antonov An-26 carrying a Sudanese government delegation crashed near Talodi, killing 32 people, including ministers, politicians and senior military or security figures. In February 2025, a Sudanese army aircraft crashed in Omdurman near Wadi Sayidna military airport, killing 46 people; the dead included senior military officers, among them Maj. Gen. Bahr Ahmed Bahr and Lt. Col. Awad Ayoub. Fatal military aviation accidents continued later in 2025; in December, an Il-76 military cargo aircraft crashed while attempting to land at Osman Digna Air Base in Port Sudan, killing all crew members on board.

== Navy ==
Naval ensign

A visit by Josip Broz Tito, the President of Yugoslavia, to Sudan in 1959 helped build the impetus to create the Sudanese Navy. Yugoslavia was instrumental in the founding, training, and supply of vessels for the Sudanese Navy. Yugoslavia initially provided four coastal patrol boats. It was eventually established in 1962 to operate on the Red Sea coast and the River Nile.

In 1971, British Defence Intelligence said the Navy comprised six patrol craft, two landing craft, and three auxiliary vessels with its base at Port Sudan. In 1999, estimated naval strength was 1,300 officers and men. Reported bases were at Port Sudan and Flamingo Bay on the Red Sea and at Khartoum. The navy had two 70-ton, 75-foot, Kadir-class coastal patrol craft (Kadir [129] and Karari [130]), both transferred from Iran to Sudan in 1975, as well as sixteen inshore patrol craft and two supply ships:

- 4 Kurmuk class patrol boats
- 1 Swiftship type patrol boat
- 2 ex-Yugoslav patrol boats (Kraljevica class)
- 3 Sewart type patrol craft
- 2 Sobat class amphibious/Transport/Supply boats

The navy, according to 2004 estimates from the International Institute for Strategic Studies, had 1,800 personnel, and a base at Marsa Gwayawi on the Red Sea. By 2017 IISS estimates for navy personnel had fallen to 1,300.

== Foreign military assistance ==
Relations with the Soviets cooled in the late 1970s, and Sudan turned to China and Britain for training and equipment. In addition, Sudan received financing from Arab states, particularly Saudi Arabia, for the purchase of Western equipment. Until 1985, however, Sudan's closest military ties were with Egypt, defined by a 25-year defense agreement signed in 1976. The accord provided for shared planning and staffing; the Egyptians also supplied Sudan with ammunition and various types of weaponry, such as antitank missiles and armored personnel carriers. Al-Bashir reaffirmed the pact after his 1989 coup, but the Egyptians declined to supply additional military aid after Sudan refused to condemn the Iraqi invasion of Kuwait in 1990.

U.S. military aid to Sudan initially consisted primarily of training a small number of Sudanese officers. Between fiscal year (FY) 1979 and FY 1982, military sales credits rose from US$5 million to US$100 million. Apart from aircraft, the United States provided Sudan with artillery, armored personnel carriers, Commando armored cars, and M–60 tanks. U.S. grant aid reached a peak of US$101 million in FY 1982. Sudan granted the United States naval facilities at Port Sudan and gave the United States Central Command some airport-prepositioning rights for military equipment for contingent use. In 1981 and 1983, Sudanese and U.S. forces participated in the multi-national Exercise Bright Star maneuvers.

The United States reduced military grants and credits when the Southern Sudanese civil war resumed in 1983. After FY 1987, no assistance was extended with the exception of less than US$1 million annually for advanced training for SAF officers and maintenance for previously supplied equipment. Washington suspended military aid in 1989 under a provision of the United States Foreign Assistance Act that prohibits assistance to countries in arrears on interest payments on previous loans. In March 1990, the United States invoked a provision of the act barring aid to regimes that overthrow a democratic government. The United States terminated arms sales to Sudan in late 1992, while the European Union instituted an arms embargo against Sudan in 1994. These actions, however, had no impact on Sudan's ability to replenish its arsenals.

According to the U.S. Arms Control and Disarmament Agency, Sudan obtained about US$350 million in military arms and equipment between 1983 and 1988. The United States was the largest supplier, accounting for US$120 million. China and France each provided US$30 million and Britain, US$10 million. About US$160 million came from unidentified sources, probably largely from Egypt and Libya, and as purchases from other Western suppliers financed by Arab countries.

Various Middle East and Gulf countries, particularly Iran and Libya but also Egypt, provided more than US$2 billion in "economic aid" in the 1970s, much of which Khartoum used to buy weapons. Additionally, each of Sudan's neighbors provided weapons and/or sanctuary to various anti-Khartoum rebel groups and militias. Since the early 1990s, at least 34 countries have exported ammunition, light arms, and small arms to Sudan. In more recent years, reliable sources have suggested that there were between 1.9 and 3.2 million small arms in Sudan. About one-fifth of these weapons were held by the Sudanese government and/or pro-Khartoum militias.

Sudan constituted one of Africa's major consumers of weapons in the early 2000s. As was the case in earlier decades, Sudan continued to rely on an array of suppliers, among them Belarus, China, Egypt, Iran, Romania, Russia, Poland, and South Africa, for ammunition, armored vehicles, helicopters, howitzers, infantry fighting vehicles, attack and fighter aircraft, multiple rocket launchers, main battle tanks, and transport aircraft. Additionally, China supervised arms assembly and assisted in the construction of weapons factories.

Sudan manufactured at least a small amount of ammunition for light weapons in the early 1960s, but the country's capacity to produce arms greatly expanded with the opening of the GIAD industrial city south of Khartoum in October 2000. Under the auspices of the Military Industry Corporation within the Ministry of Defense, engineering and industrial enterprises produced or imported a range of equipment and technology for ground and air forces. Although information was limited, in the early 2000s this equipment included heavy and light artillery, antitank and antiaircraft guns, machine guns and small arms, tanks, and armored personnel carriers, as well as ammunition for these weapons; the country also had acquired the ability to assemble and maintain aircraft, including fighter and cargo airplanes and helicopters.

The SPLM/A, under the late John Garang's leadership, regularly accused the SAF of using chemical weapons in South Sudan, but these allegations were never substantiated. The same was true of the U.S. charge in 1998 that the al-Shifa Pharmaceuticals Industries factory in Khartoum North was developing chemical weapons or precursor chemicals, a claim that led to the United States bombing of the plant. Similarly, news reports in 2004 that Sudanese and Syrian troops had tested chemical weapons against civilians in Darfur were never confirmed. Some independent observers maintain that Garang on his part used the chemical-weapons issue as a disinformation campaign against Khartoum and Washington.

The UAE in recent years has supplied arms to both the RSF and the SAF, which has created clashes in Sudan. Since 2014, The UAE supplied arms and also trained RSF members for using heavy weapons. On 25 April 2023, footage emerged of thermobaric shells captured by Sudanese army, which shows its manufacturing in Serbia in the year 2020, then supplied through the UAE to Sudan. Sudanese military received training by Egyptian forces. On the contrary Egypt also mediated the ceasefire as per the Egyptian source.

== Foreign relations ==
=== Relationship with Iran ===
The SAF has relied heavily on Iranian drones for its fighting. In 2024, the Washington Post reported on the Sudan Conflict Observatory, which tracked seven flights from Iran, which were believed to contain military cargo. The Observatory noted that since the outbreak of fighting in 2023, there has been an increase in Iranian weapons such as the Iranian-made Mohajer-6 drones.

In 2026, the United States authorities arrested a woman, Shahim Mafi, in Los Angeles. Federal prosecutors charged her with trafficking weapons to the SAF, including the sale of: “drones, bombs, bomb fuses, and millions of rounds of ammunition.”

Intelligence from within Sudan’s own security apparatus also points to the risks posed by growing ideological and political affinities between elements of the Sudanese Armed Forces (SAF) camp and Iran. A leaked assessment from the Analysis and Assessment Department of Sudan’s General Intelligence Service warns that rhetoric from Islamist factions aligned with the SAF has increasingly expressed support for Tehran amid broader regional tensions. According to the report, these statements — widely circulated through traditional and social media — risk creating the perception among regional actors that Khartoum is drifting toward the Iranian axis. Sudanese intelligence officials cautioned that such messaging could damage relations with key Gulf partners, particularly Saudi Arabia and Qatar, whose economic and political support remains critical to Sudan’s stability. The document ultimately recommended urgent diplomatic engagement with Gulf capitals to reassure them that pro-Iranian rhetoric from Islamist factions does not formally represent Sudan’s foreign policy—an implicit acknowledgment of the sensitivity surrounding any perceived alignment between the SAF and Tehran.

=== Relationship with Russia ===
Russia has long provided military aid to the Sudanese Armed Forces (SAF), including tanks, aircraft, and artillery. For example, the Sudanese Air Force operates Russian-made aircraft, with current inventories including 4 MiG-21M, 3 MiG-23MS, and 11 MiG-29SE fighters Sudanese Air Force. By mid-2024, Russia began favoring the SAF over the Rapid Support Forces (RSF), offering weapons for a naval base in Port Sudan. The relationship between the SAF and Russia deepened, with military aid focusing on sustaining the SAF's operations against the RSF. The naval base agreement, if finalized, would provide Russia with a strategic foothold in the Red Sea, enhancing its global naval presence and access to African interior supply lines. However, the role of the Wagner Group introduces complexity. Despite Russia's state-level support for the SAF, Wagner continues to engage with the RSF, as evidenced by May 2024 reports of facilitating arms supplies from the United Arab Emirates via the Central African Republic. Russia hedges bets by aiding both sides in conflict.

=== Relationship with Ukraine ===
Despite Sudan's initial pro-Russian stance in the UN, it supplied weapons to Ukraine after Russia's 2022 invasion. Ukraine plans to build a new embassy in Sudan to strengthen ties, reflecting mutual interests in countering Russian aggression. The Embassy of Sudan in Ukraine was established in September 2013, with an Honorary Consulate of Ukraine in Khartoum, further formalizing ties. Ukrainian special forces have been active in Sudan's civil war, focusing on operations against the Russian Wagner Group and their allies. Reports from sources like The Kyiv Post and CNN indicate their involvement since September 2023, with activities including drone strikes and ground attacks. The strategic importance of Sudan for both Ukraine and Russia lies in its location and resources, with Wagner's gold mining concessions adding economic layers to the conflict. Ukraine's involvement may force Russia to divert Wagner fighters, as seen in reports of recalls from central Africa to reinforce efforts in Ukraine, potentially impacting Sudan's stability.

== Uniforms, ranks, and insignia ==
Before 1970 the highest officer grade in the rank structure was that of Bajalee (equivalent to a lieutenant general), but new grades were added when Nimeiri became a general and, later, a field marshal. As of 1991, however, there were no officers higher than lieutenant general, and only five, including Bashir, at that rank.

The army service uniform was dark green, with insignia of rank displayed in gold on shoulder boards. It differed only slightly from police officer uniforms, which were another shade of green with black shoulder boards. A green beret was standard in the army except for airborne units, which wore red berets. The police wore black berets. Officers of field grade and above frequently wore service caps. The air force uniform was blue, although the insignia of rank were the same as for the army. The standard naval uniform was white with blue shoulder boards.
