= Military ranks of Sudan =

The Military ranks of Sudan are the military insignia used by the Sudanese Armed Forces. Being a former colony of United Kingdom, Sudan shares a rank structure similar to that of the United Kingdom. Prior to 1970, Fariq was the highest rank.

== Commissioned officer ranks ==
The rank insignia of commissioned officers.

Rank group	General / flag officers					Senior officers			Junior officers
Sudanese Army
Sudanese Army	مشیر; Mushir	فريق أول; Fariq 'awal	فريق; Fariq	لواء; Liwa	عميد; Amid	عقيد; Aqid	مقدم; Muqaddam	رائد; Ra'id	نقيب; Naqib	ملازم أول; Mulazim awwal	ملازم; Mulazim
Sudanese Navy
Sudanese Navy	مشیر; Mushir	فريق أول; Fariq 'awal	فريق; Fariq	لواء; Liwa	عميد; Amid	عقيد; Aqid	مقدم; Muqaddam	رائد; Ra'id	نقيب; Naqib	ملازم أول; Mulazim awwal	ملازم; Mulazim
Sudanese Air Force
Sudanese Air Force	مشیر; Mushir	فريق أول; Fariq 'awal	فريق; Fariq	لواء; Liwa	عميد; Amid	عقيد; Aqid	مقدم; Muqaddam	رائد; Ra'id	نقيب; Naqib	ملازم أول; Mulazim awwal	ملازم; Mulazim
Sudanese Rapid Support Forces
Sudanese Rapid Support Forces		فريق أول; Fariq 'awal	فريق; Fariq	لواء; Liwa	عميد; Amid	عقيد; Aqid	مقدم; Muqaddam	رائد; Ra'id	نقيب; Naqib	ملازم أول; Mulazim awwal	ملازم; Mulazim
Rank group	General / flag officers					Senior officers			Junior officers

== Other ranks ==
The rank insignia of non-commissioned officers and enlisted personnel.

Rank group	Senior NCOs			Junior NCOs		Enlisted
Sudanese Army						No insignia
Sudanese Army	مساعد; Mosa'id	رقيب أول; Raqib awwal	رقيب; Raqib	عريف 'arif	وكيل عريف; Wakil 'arif	جندي; Jundiun
Sudanese Navy						No insignia
Sudanese Navy	مساعد; Mosa'id	رقيب أول; Raqib awwal	رقيب; Raqib	عريف 'arif	وكيل عريف; Wakil 'arif	جندي; Jundiun
Sudanese Air Force						No insignia
Sudanese Air Force	مساعد; Mosa'id	رقيب أول; Raqib awwal	رقيب; Raqib	عريف 'arif	وكيل عريف; Wakil 'arif	جندي; Jundiun
Rank group	Senior NCOs			Junior NCOs		Enlisted
