= Comparative navy enlisted ranks of Arabophone countries =

Rank comparison chart of Non-commissioned officer and enlisted ranks for navies of Arabophone states.

== Other ranks ==
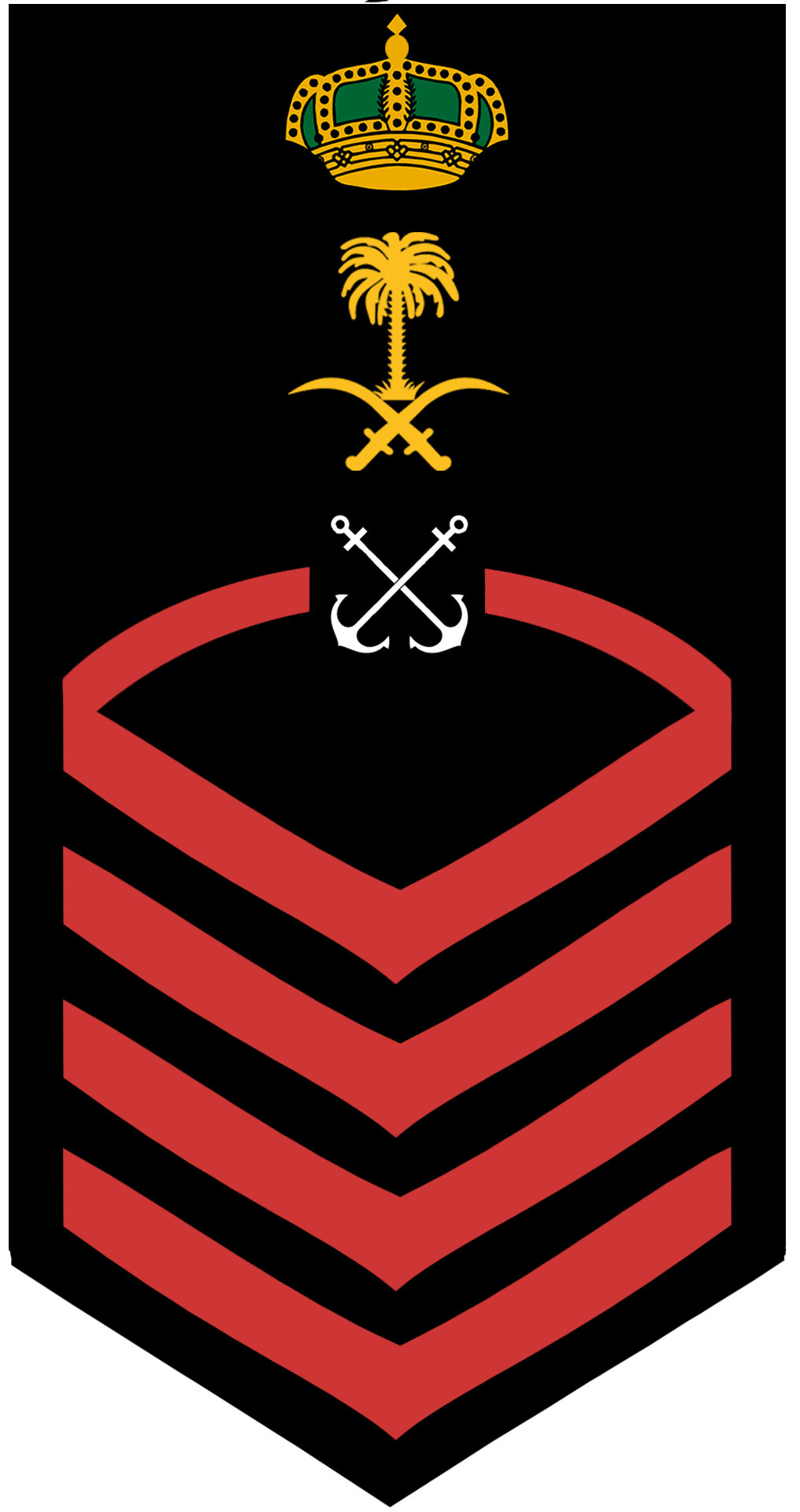
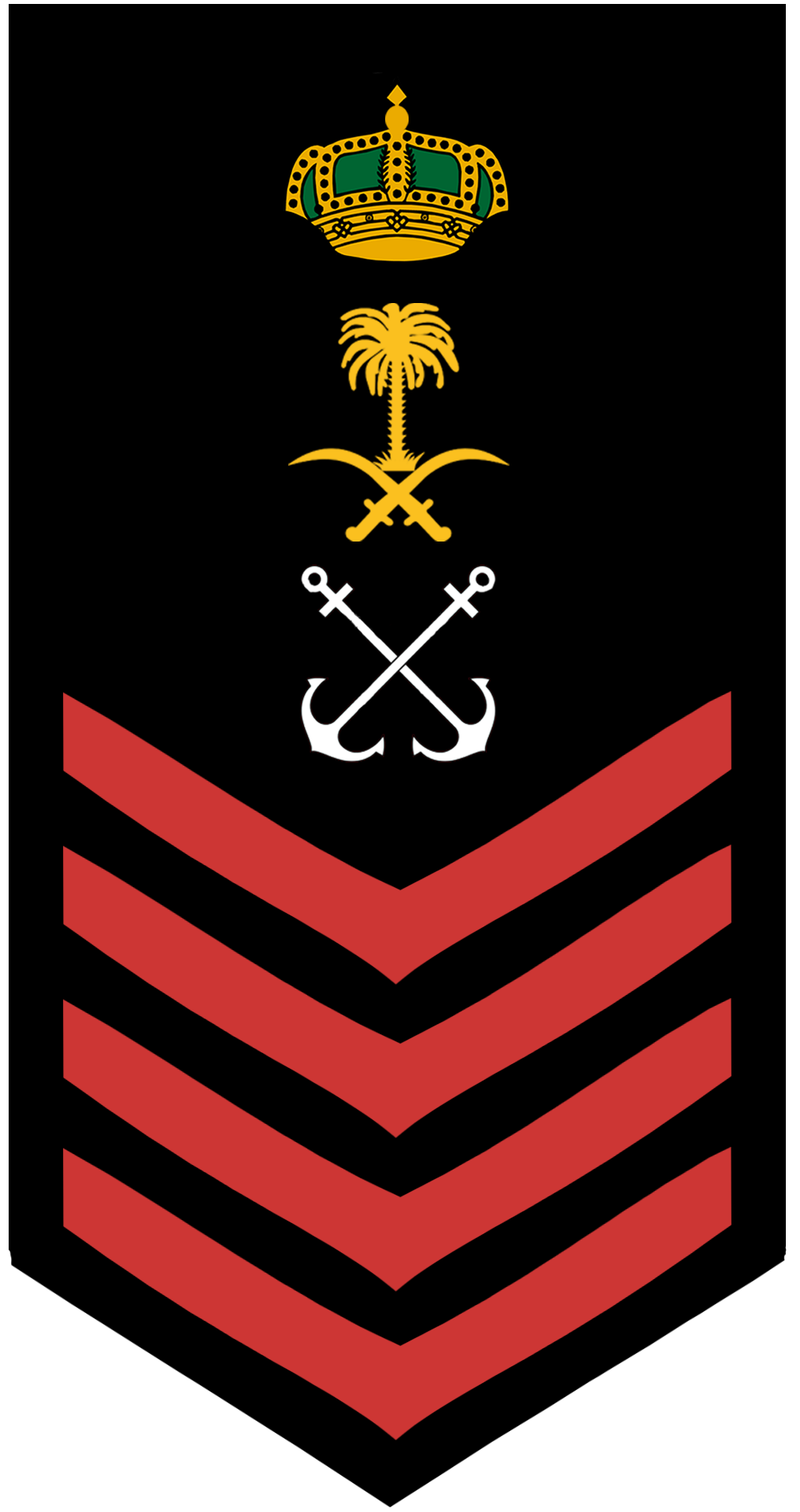
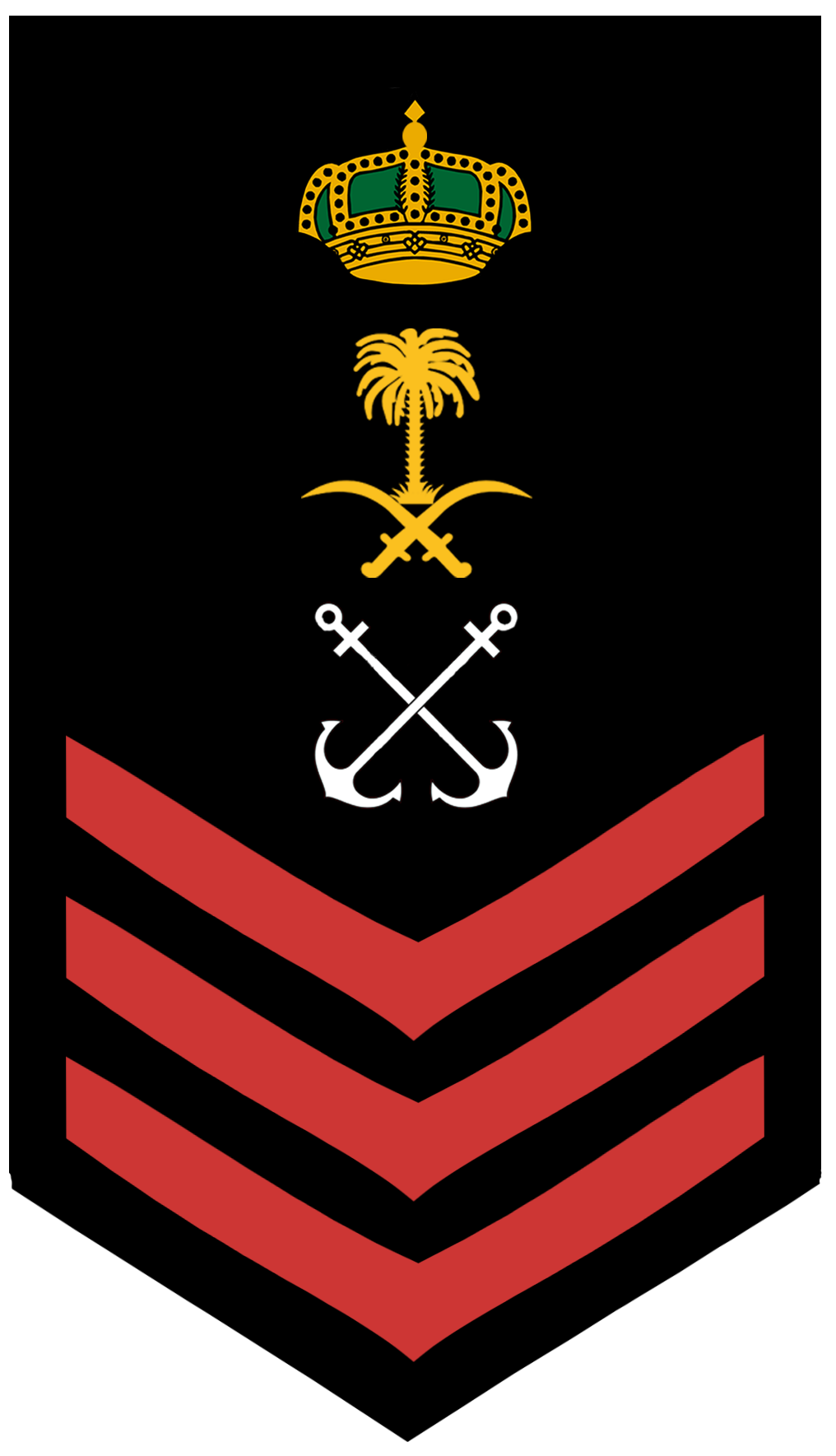
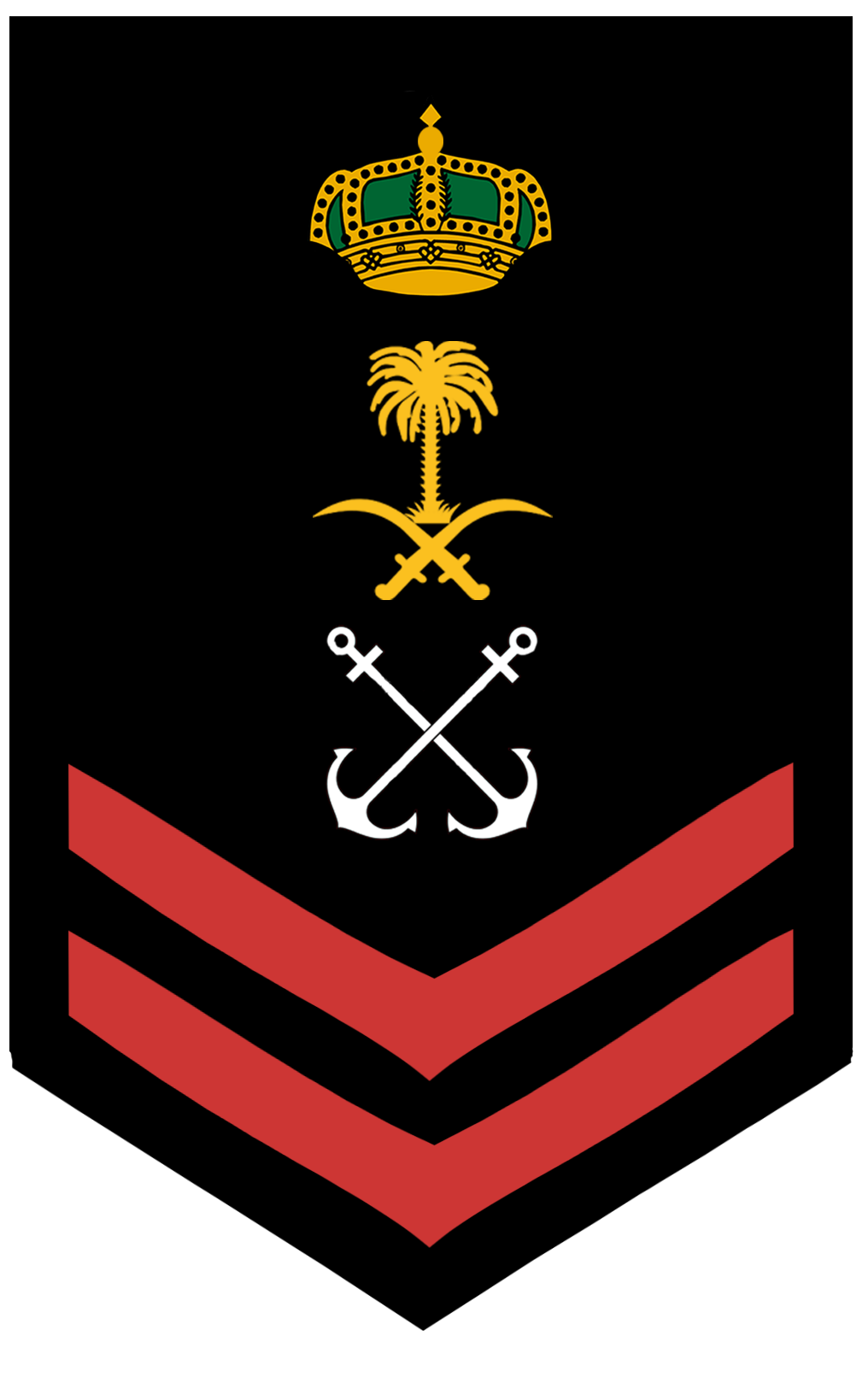
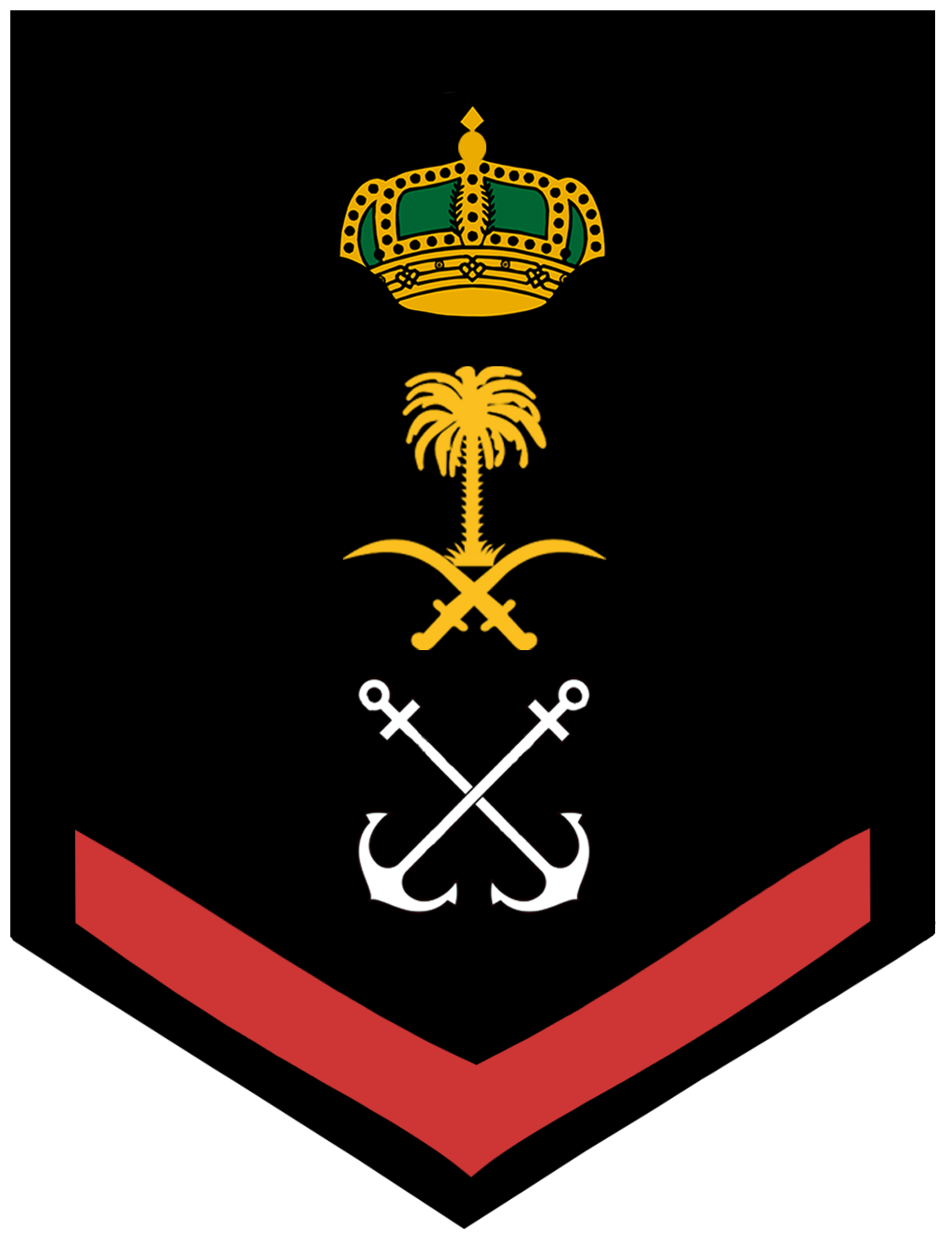
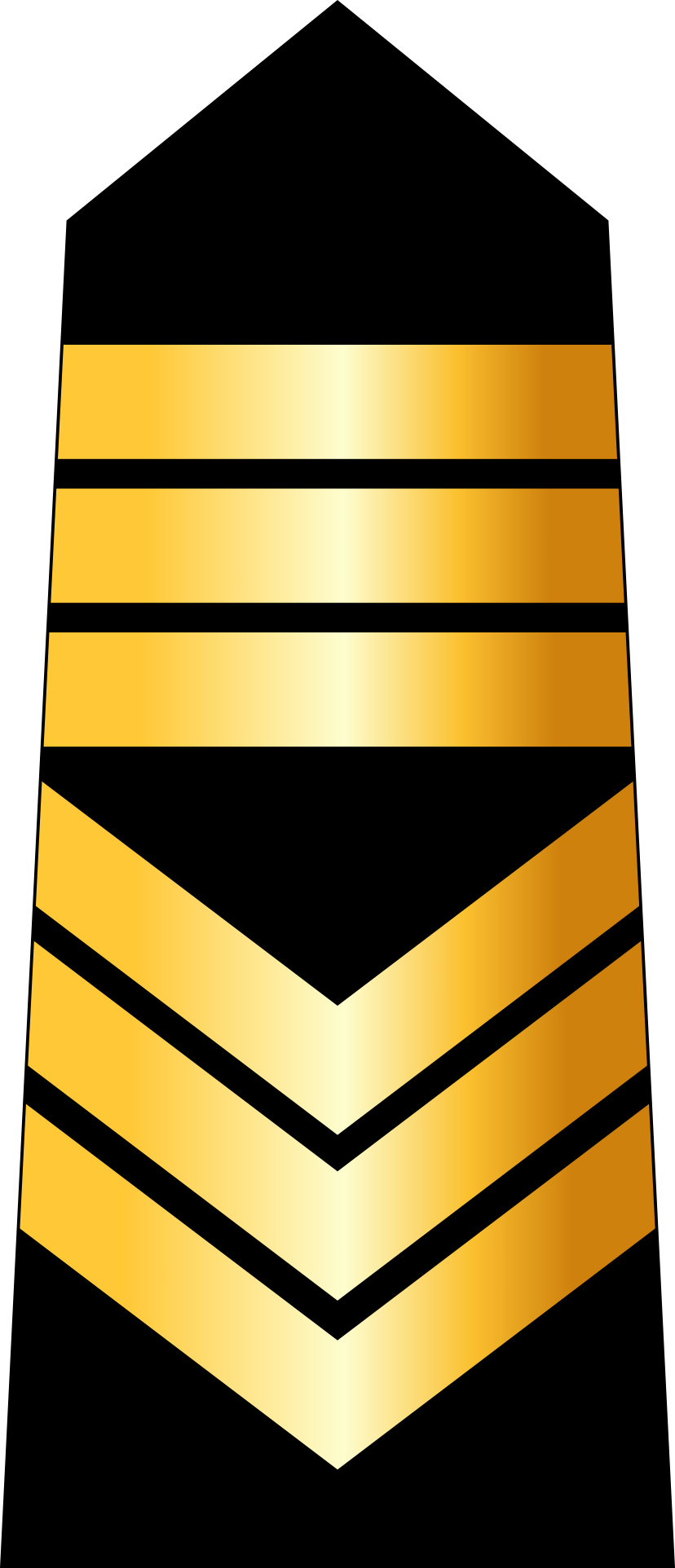
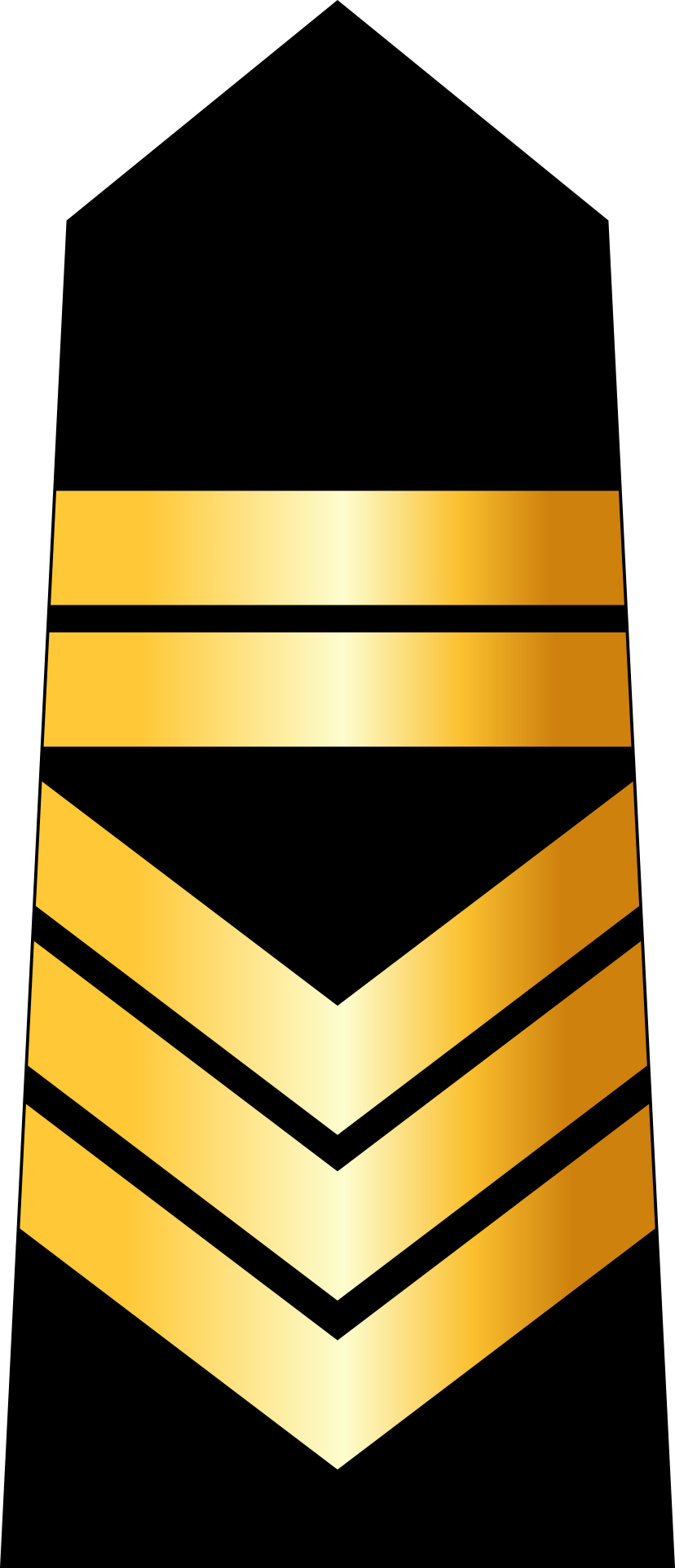
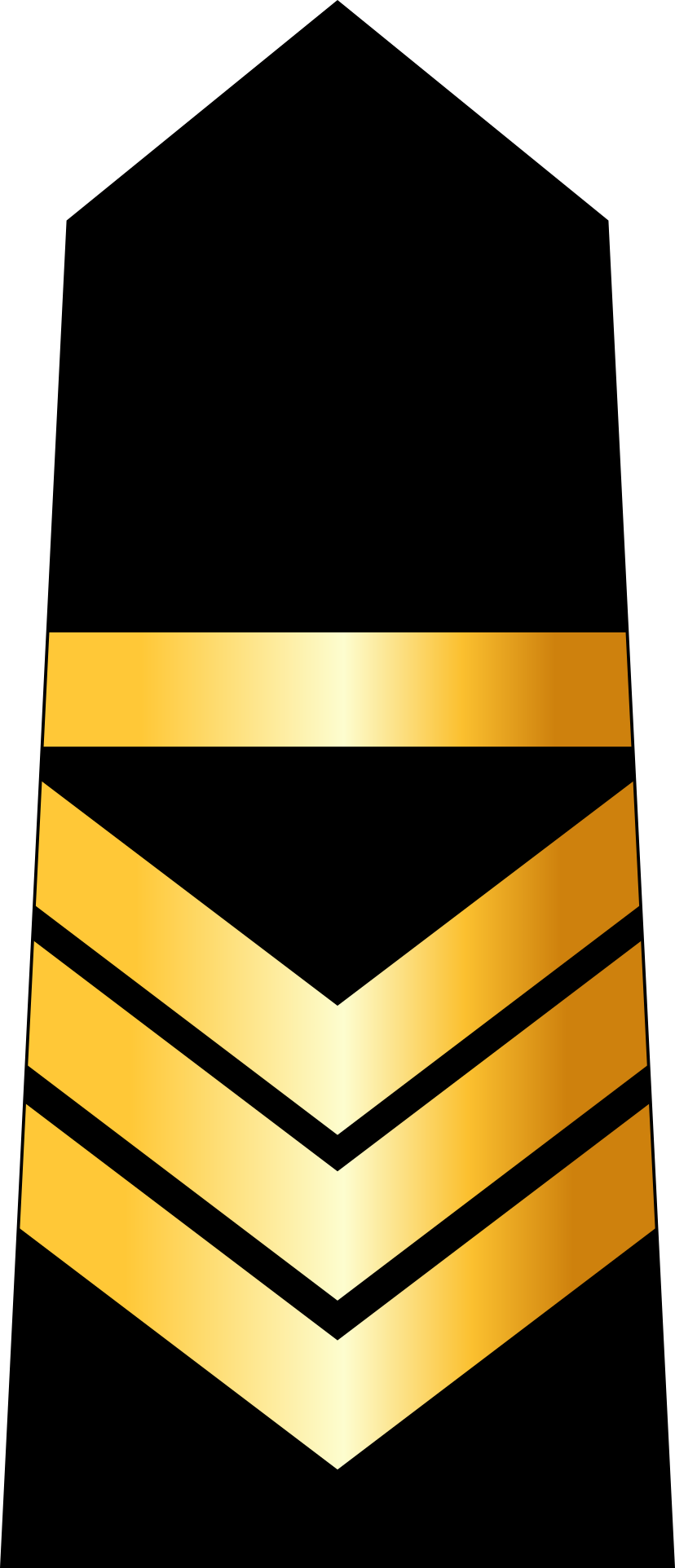
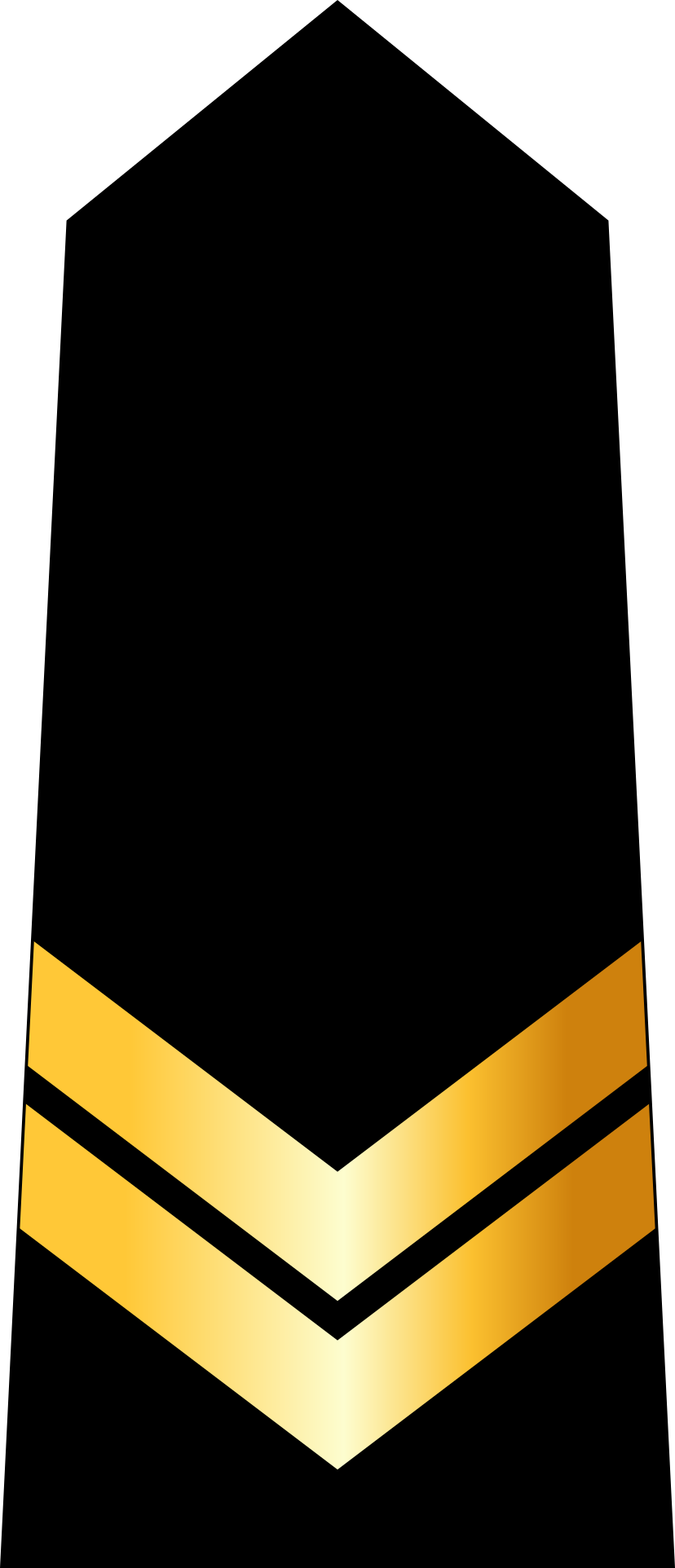
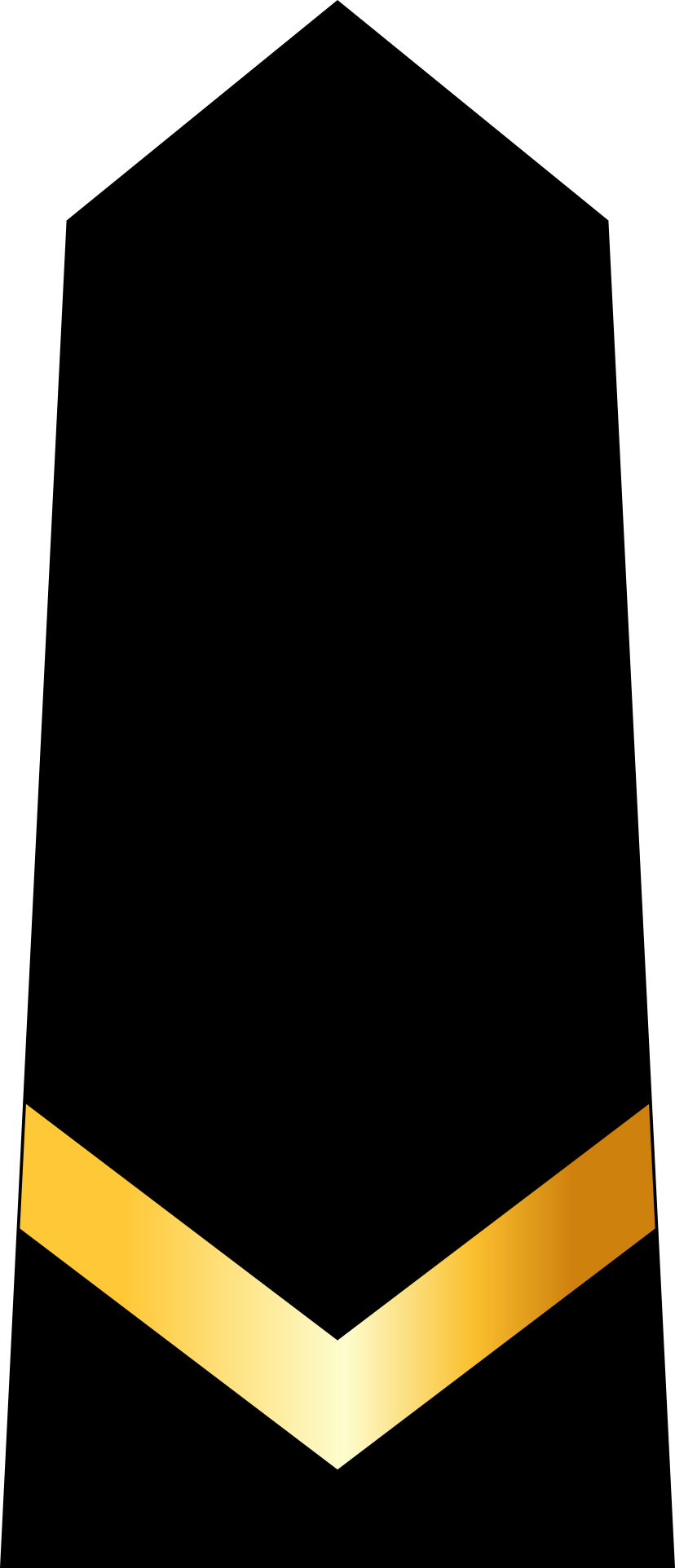
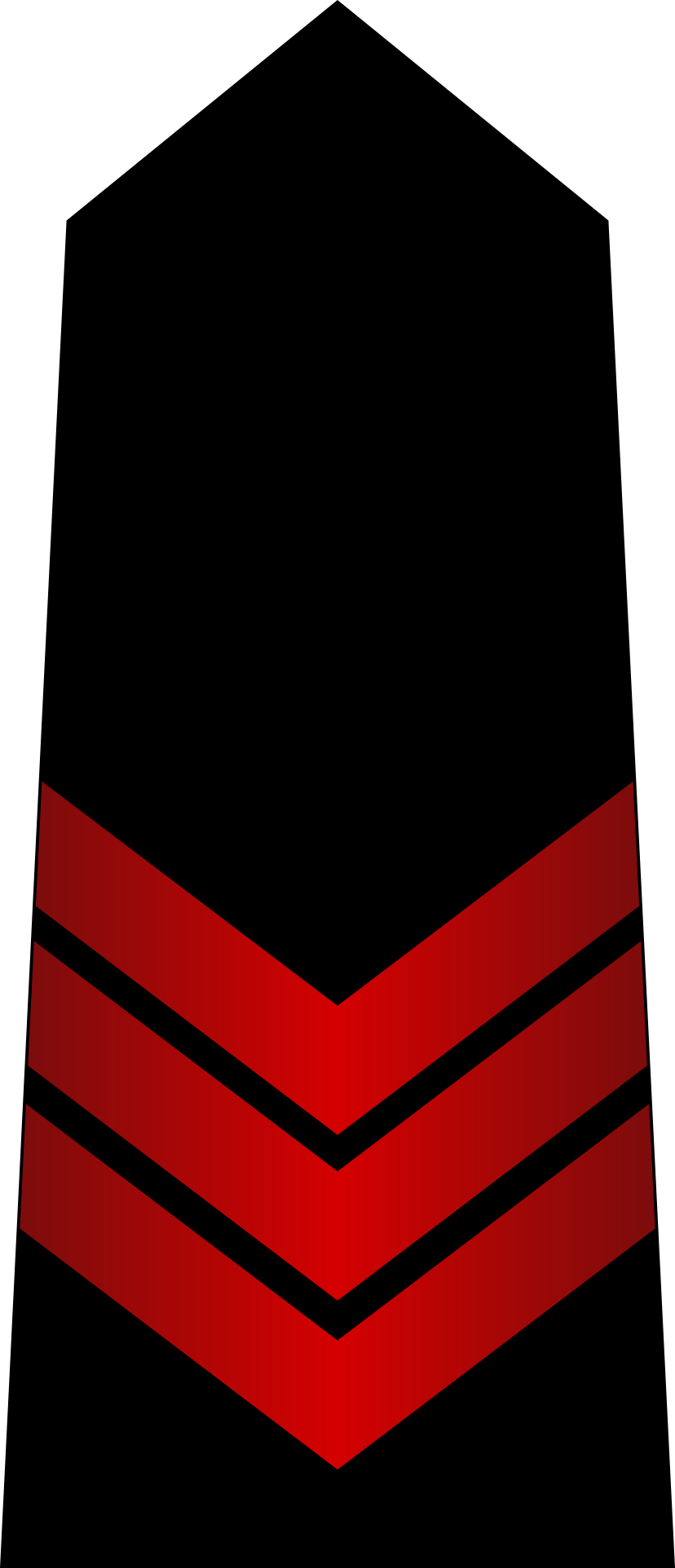
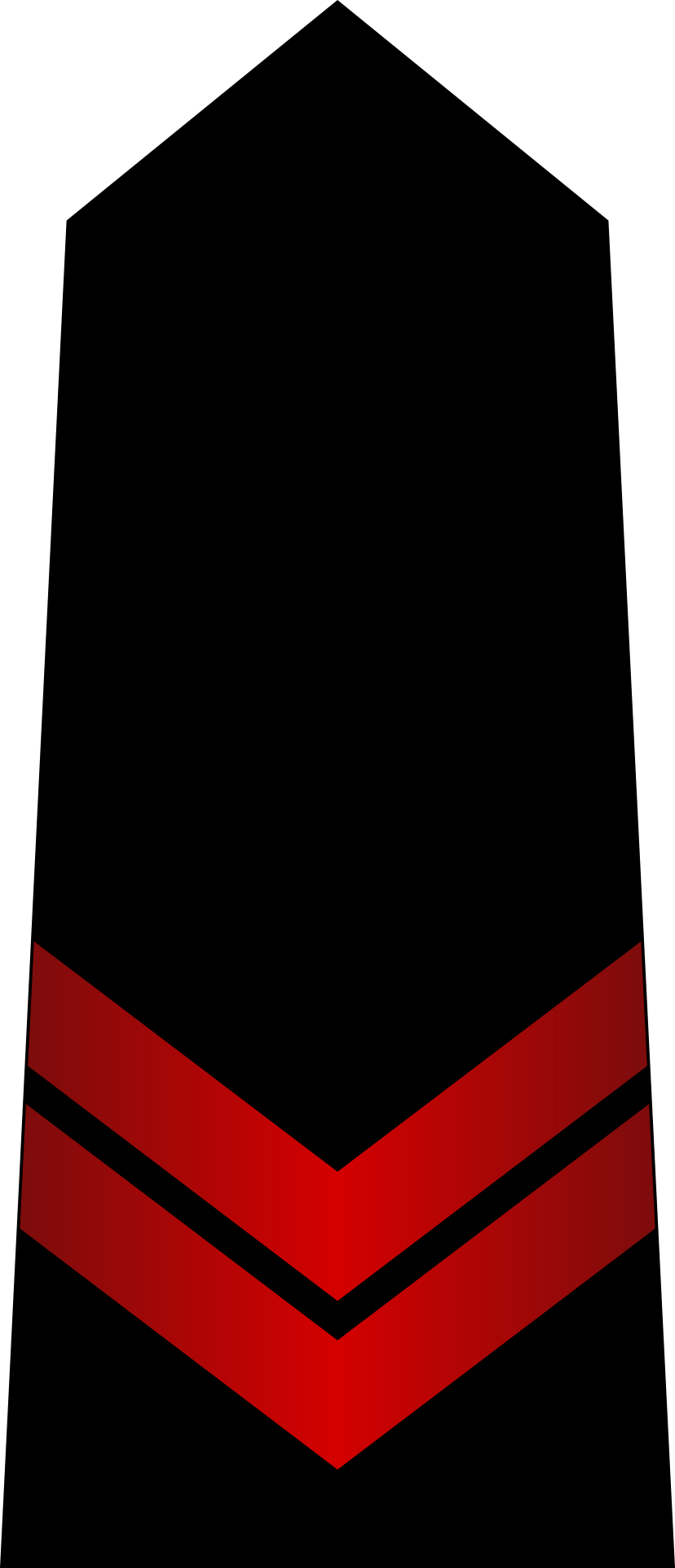
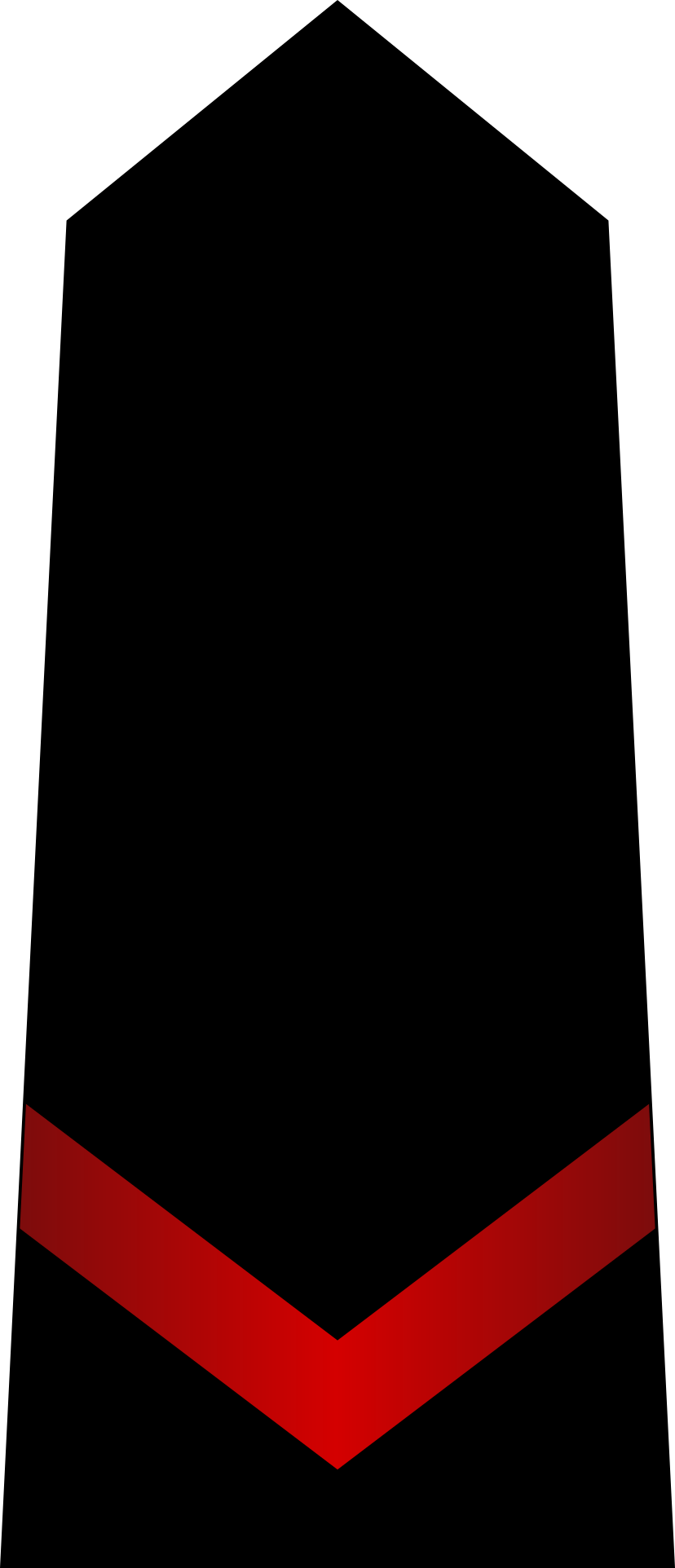
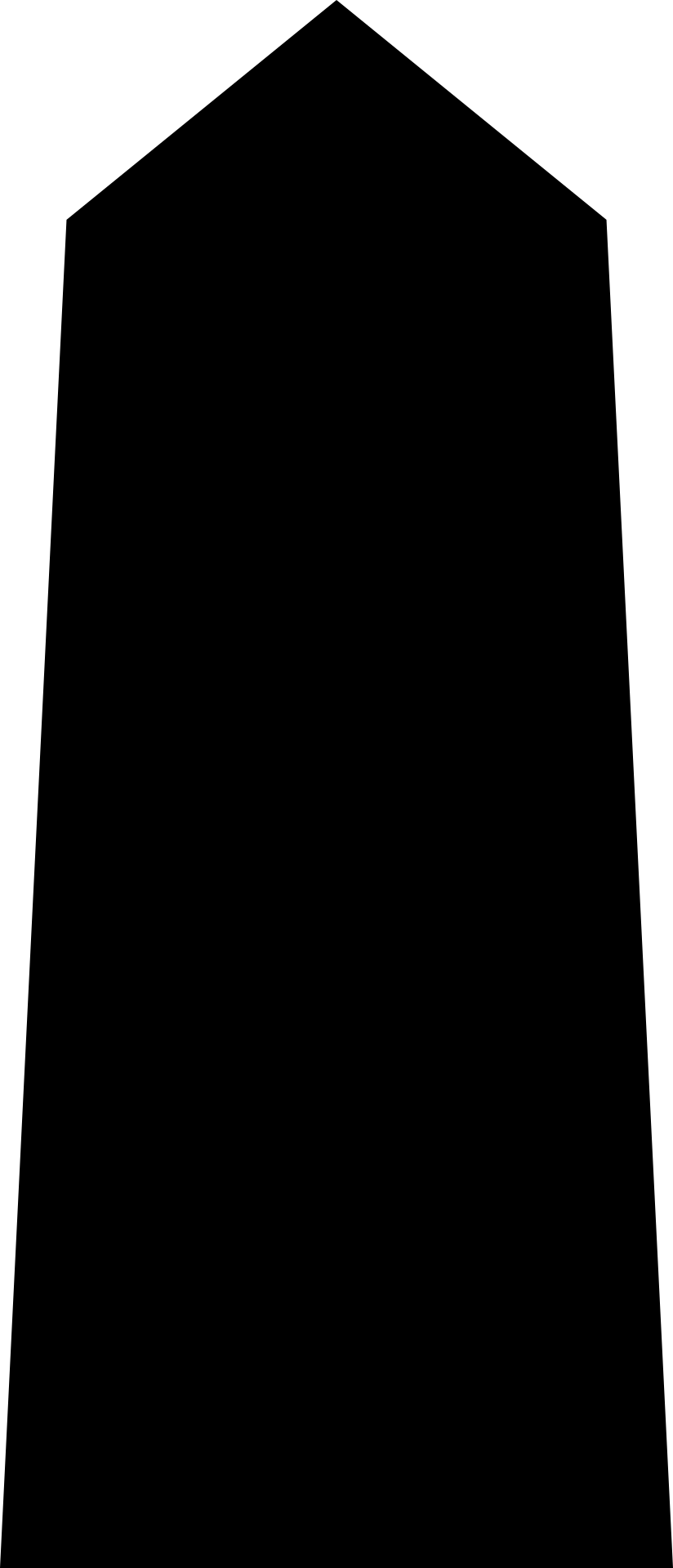
Rank group	Senior NCOs							Junior NCOs		Enlisted
Algerian National Navy											No insignia
Algerian National Navy	مساعد أول; Mosa'id awwal			مساعد; Mosa'id		رقيب أول; Raqib awwal	رقيب; Raqib	عريف أول; Earif 'awal	عريف; Earif		جندي; Jundiun
Algerian National Navy	Adjudant chef			Adjudant		Sergent chef	Sergent	Caporal chef	Caporal		Djoundi
Royal Bahrain Naval Force											No insignia
Royal Bahrain Naval Force					رقیب أول; Raqib 'awal		رقیب; Raqib	عريف; Earif		جندي أول; Jundiun awwal	جندي; Jundiun
Djiboutian Navy
Djiboutian Navy	Maître-principal			Premier maître		Maître	Second maître	Quartier-maitre se 1^{ère} classe	Quartier-maitre se 2^{ème} classe	Matelot brevet	Matelot
Egyptian Navy
Egyptian Navy	مساعد أول; Mosa'id awwal			مساعد; Mosa'id	رقيب أول; Raqib awwal	رقيب; Raqib		عريف 'arif		جندي; Jundi
Iraqi Navy
Iraqi Navy					رقيب أول; Rayiys eurafa	رقيب; Arif		نائب عريف; Nāyīb arīf		جندي أول; Jundi 'awwal	جندى; Jundi
Royal Jordanian Navy											No insignia
Royal Jordanian Navy	وكيل أول; Wakil 'awal			وكيل; Wakil	رقيب أول; Raqib 'awal	رقیب; Raqib		عريف; Earif		جندي أول; Jundiun awwal	جندي; Jundiun
Rank group	Senior NCOs							Junior NCOs		Enlisted
Kuwait Navy											No insignia
Kuwait Navy	وكيل أول; Wakil 'awal			وكيل; Wakil	رقيب أول; Raqib 'awal	رقیب; Raqib		عريف; Earif		جندي أول; Jundiun awwal	جندي; Jundiun
Lebanese Navy											No insignia
Lebanese Navy	مؤهل أول; Muahal 'awal	مؤهل; Muahal	معاون أوّل; Maawan 'awal	معاون; Maawan		رقيب أوّل; Raqib awwl	رقيب; Raqīb	عريف أول; Earif 'awal	عريف; Earif	جندي أول; Jundiun 'awal	جندي; Jundiun
Libyan Navy											No insignia
Libyan Navy				Master sergeant		Staff sergeant	Sergeant	Corporal		Private 1st class	Private
Mauritanian Navy
Mauritanian Navy	مساعد أول بحري; Mosa'id awwal bahriun			مساعد بحري; Mosa'id bahriun		رقيب أول بحري; Raqib awwal bahriun	رقيب بحري; Raqib bahriun		عريف بحري 'arif bahriun		بحار; Bihaar
Royal Moroccan Navy											No insignia
Royal Moroccan Navy	Maître principal			Premier maître	Maître	Second-maître de 1^{ère} classe	Second-maître de 2^{ème} classe	Quartier-maître de 1^{ère} classe	Quartier-maître de 2^{ème} classe	Matelot de 1^{ère} classe	Matelot
Royal Navy of Oman
Royal Navy of Oman	وكيل أول; Wakil 'awal			وكيل; Wakil		رقيب أول; Raqib 'awal	رقيب; Raqib		عريف; Earif	نائب عريف; Nayib earif
Qatari Emiri Navy										No insignia
Qatari Emiri Navy	وكيل اول; Wakil awwal			وكيل ثاني; Wakil thani	رقيب; Raqib	نائب; Nayib		عريف; Earif	وكيل عريف; Wakil earif	جندي; Jundi
Royal Saudi Navy											No insignia
Royal Saudi Navy				رقيب أول; Raqib 'awal	رقيب; Raqib	وكيل رقيب; Wakil raqib		عريف; Earif		جندي أول; Jundiun awwal	جندي; Jundiun
Rank group	Senior NCOs							Junior NCOs		Enlisted
Somali Navy										No insignia
Somali Navy	Musharax sarkaal		Sadex xarígle	Laba xarígle	Xarígle	Sadex alífle		Laba alífle	Alífle	Dable
Sudanese Navy										No insignia
Sudanese Navy				مساعد; Mosa'id	رقيب أول; Raqib awwal	رقيب; Raqib		عريف 'arif	وكيل عريف; Wakil 'arif	جندي; Jundiun
Syrian Navy											No insignia
Syrian Navy	مساعد أول; Musaeid 'awal		مساعد ثاني; Musaeid thani	مساعد; Musaeid	رقيب أول; Raqib 'awal	رقيب ثاني; Raqib thani	رقيب; Raqib	عريف; Earif		جندي أول; Jundiun 'awal	جندي; Jundiun
Tunisian National Navy
Tunisian National Navy	وكيل أعلى بالبحرية; Wakil 'aelaa bialbahria		وكيل أول بالبحرية; Wakil 'awal bialbahria	وكيل بالبحرية; Wakil bialbahria		عريف أول بالبحرية; Earif 'awal bialbahria	عريف بالبحرية; Earif bialbahria	رقيب أول بالبحرية; Raqib 'awal bialbahria	رقيب بالبحرية; Raqib bialbahria	جندي أول بحرية; Jundiun awwal bialbahria	جندي متطوع بحرية; Jundiun bialbahria
Tunisian National Navy	Maître-principal		Premier maître	Maître		Second maître de 1^{ère} classe	Second maître de 2^{ème} classe	Quartier-maitre de 1^{ère} classe	Quartier-maitre de 2^{ème} classe	Matelot breveté	Matelot
United Arab Emirates Navy											No insignia
United Arab Emirates Navy				مساعد أول; Musa'id 'awal	مساعد; Musa'id		رقیب; Raqib	عريف; Earif		جندي أول; Jundi awwal	جندي; Jundi
Yemeni Navy
Yemeni Navy	Warrant officer				Petty officer first class	Petty officer second class		Petty officer third class	Seaman
Rank group	Senior NCOs							Junior NCOs		Enlisted
