= National Ribat University =

University in Khartoum, Sudan

- جامعة الرباط الوطني
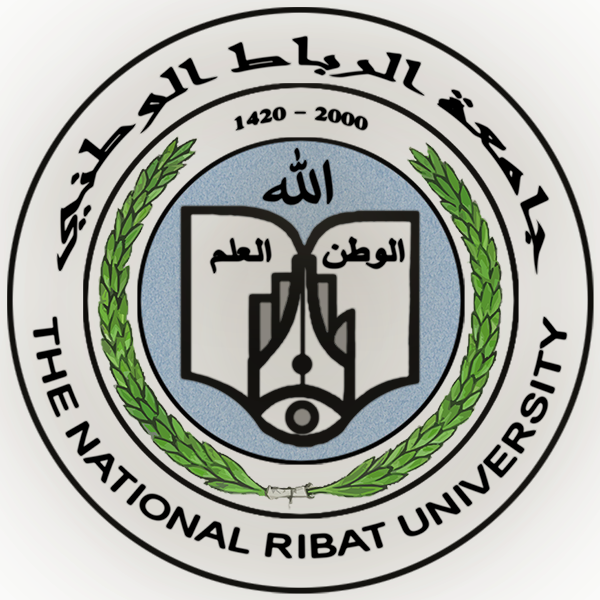
- Motto: الله, الوطن, العلم
- Motto in English: God, Homeland, Knowledge
- Type: Private
- Established: May 2000; 26 years ago
- President: Abdullatif Ashmaiq Khalifa
- Vice-president: Omar AbdElAziz
- Location: Khartoum, Sudan; 15°36′47″N 32°33′35″E
- Campus: Urban
- Language: English Arabic
- Colours: Brown & beige
- Website: ribat.edu.sd

The National Ribat University (NRU) (Arabic: جامعة الرباط الوطني) is a university based in the city of Khartoum, Sudan.

The President of the Republic is the university's sponsor. The University Council is chaired by the Minister of Interior, and the Director General of Sudanese Police Forces is his deputy. The university is ranked 10,402 in the world, third in Sudan. In Sudan, it ranks below the University of Khartoum and the Sudan University of Science and Technology, above Karary University and the International University of Africa.

The National Ribat University is one of the biggest universities in Sudan that offers a variety of programs, including Associate degree, Bachelor's degree, and Master's degree. This university is partially affiliated with the Sudanese Police, but students do not graduate with an official police rank.

== Academic departments ==
Initially, the university had three faculties: Police Sciences and Law, Medicine, and Nursing Sciences. Since then, additional faculties have been added. The National Ribat University currently contains 18 faculties, 3 centers, and 2 institutes.

=== Faculties ===
- Police Higher Academy (1925)
- Faculty of Police Science and Law
- Faculty of Medicine (2000)
- Faculty of Dentistry (2001)
- Faculty Of Pharmacy (2001)
- Faculty of Medical Laboratory Science (2000)
- Faculty of Radiology and Nuclear Medicine (2001)
- Faculty of Nursing (2000)
- Faculty of Architecture (2010)
- Faculty of Economic, Administrative and Financial Sciences (2005)
- Faculty of Computer Studies (2001)
- Faculty of Technology and Health Science (2005)
- Faculty of Law (2013)
- Faculty of Language and Translation (2005)
- Faculty of Media (2010)
- Faculty of Environmental Studies and Disaster Management (2001)
- Abdusalam Elkhabir Faculty for Islamic and Quranic Studies (1999)
- Faculty of Graduate Studies and Research (2001)

=== Centers ===
- Poisons Center
- Strategic Studies Center
- Center of Elsharif Zain Alabidin Elhindi for Strategic and Security Studies (2001)

=== Institutes ===
- Research Institute of Criminal and Social Studies
- Institute of Forensic Evidence Science

== See also ==
- University of Khartoum
- Sudan University of Science and Technology
- University of al-Jazirah
- The Future University (Sudan)
- Ahfad University for Women
- List of universities in Sudan
- Education in Sudan
- Sudanese Universities Information Network
