= Sudanese Military Academy =

Military academy in Sudan

- الكلية الحربية السودانية
- Motto: Factory of men and the den of heroes Arabic: مصنع الرجال وعرين الأبطال
- Established: 1948, 77–78 years
- Location: Omdurman; 15°50′3.26447″N 32°31′21.87649″E
- Language: Arabic
- Location in Sudan

Sudanese Military Academy (Arabic: الكلية الحربية السودانية) is one of the military colleges in Sudan and the first military college established in Africa. The Military College at Wadi Sayyidna, near Omdurman, has been Sudan's primary source of officer training since it opened in 1948. The Military College is also known as "the factory of men and the den of heroes" (Arabic: مصنع الرجال وعرين الأبطال).

It offers a two-year program with emphasises on the study of political and military science, as well as physical training. Upon completion of the program, graduates are commissioned as second lieutenants in the Sudanese Armed Forces (SAF). The military student graduates from the college after three years with the rank of lieutenant in the Sudanese Armed Forces and a diploma degree in military and administrative sciences. The college also has academic studies according to military studies. The college also award a bachelor’s degree after four years with the rank of first lieutenant. The college has been known to receive military students from some Arab and African countries.

According to the US's Federal Research Division, in the late 1950s, roughly 60 graduated each year, peaking to more than 500 in early 1972 as a result of mobilization brought on by the First Sudanese Civil War. During the late 1970s and early 1980s, an average of 120 to 150 officers were graduated from the Military College each year. However, this number varied over time due to different factors, including mobilization brought on by conflicts and rebellions within Sudan. Students from other Arab and African countries were also trained at the Military College, and in 1982, 60 Ugandans were graduated as part of a Sudanese contribution to rebuilding the Ugandan army after Idi Amin's removal from power. It was announced in 1990 that 600 members of the National Islamic Front's associated militia, the Popular Defence Forces (PDF), had been selected to attend the Military College to help fill the ranks of the officer corps depleted by resignations or dismissals.

Since the early 1970s, the Staff College in Omdurman has graduated 55 to 60 majors and lieutenant colonels annually with masters' degrees in military science. Officers from other Arab countries — Jordan, Kuwait, and the United Arab Emirates — attended, as well as some Palestinians. Since 1981 the High Military Academy in Omdurman, a war college designed to prepare colonels and brigadier generals for more senior positions, offered a six-month course on national security issues. The academy was commissioned to produce strategic analyses for consideration by the Bashir government.

The Military College's course of study, while rigorous, was reportedly weak in scientific and technical instruction. Junior officers were, however, given opportunities to continue their education at the University of Khartoum. Many officers also studied abroad. It was estimated that at least 50% had received some schooling in Egypt. Others were sent to the United States, Britain (mainly pilots and mechanics), Germany (helicopter pilots), and Middle Eastern countries. Most high naval officers had were trained at the Yugoslav naval academy; other naval officers were detailed for training in the states of the Persian Gulf. Opportunities for training abroad were greatly curtailed, however, as a result of international disapproval of the policies of the Bashir government.

In addition to the academies, the SAF also operated a variety of technical schools for junior and non-commissioned officers, including infantry, artillery, communications, ordnance, engineering, and armoured schools, all in the vicinity of Khartoum. An air force training centre at Wadi Sayyidna Air Base was constructed with Chinese help to train technicians in aircraft maintenance, ground control, and other skills. In the army, recruitment and basic training of enlisted personnel were not centralized but were the responsibility of each division and regional command.

The Sudanese Military College includes Defence College, War College, Joint Command and Staff College, High Military Academy, Air Force College, Naval Academy, and Karary Academy of Military Technology.
