= Karary University =

University in Omdurman, Khartoum, Sudan

- جامعة كرري
- Former name: Karary Academy of Technology (1996-2008)
- Type: Public
- Established: 1996; 30 years ago
- Parent institution: Sudanese Military College
- Undergraduates: Medicine; Dentistry; Pharmacy; Nursing; Radiology; Engineering; Art School
- Postgraduates: Four batches graduated until now from medical school.
- Location: Omdurman, Khartoum, Sudan
- Website: Official website

The Karary University (Arabic: جامعة كرري) is a university based in the city of Omdurman in the state of Khartoum, Sudan. The university was established in 1996 as a public university funded by the Ministry of Higher Education and Scientific Research. The Karary Academy of Technology was conceived as tertiary educational institution that would prepare engineering and technological students to meet the needs of the armed forces and military industries, and to guide the relevant scientific research. In 2011, according to Centro de Ciencias Humanas y Sociales, Madrid, the university ranked 10,494 in the world, fourth in Sudan. In Sudan, it ranked behind the University of Khartoum, Sudan University of Science and Technology, National Ribat University and ahead of the International University of Africa.

In 2006, it was approved as a university that grants a bachelor’s degrees and a diploma in military sciences. The university has a college for postgraduate studies that grants master’s and doctoral degrees. The university train student to work as first lieutenants engineers in the armed forces, as well as training holders of bachelors in previous fields from other universities military training to work as first lieutenants engineers as well, and training holders of technical diplomas military training to work as first sergeants technicians and granting them an engineering diploma in the armed forces.

== See also ==
- List of universities in Sudan
- Education in Sudan
