= International University of Africa =

Public university in Khartoum, Sudan

- جامعة أفريقيا العالمية; Jāmiʿat afreqia al-alaamia
- official logo of The International University of Africa
- Type: Semi-Private/Charity University
- Established: 1977; 49 years ago
- Affiliations: FUIW; AAU
- Vice-Chancellor: Professor Hatim Osman
- Location: (Sudan) Khartoum, Sudan; 15.5326°N 32.5680°E
- Campus: Urban
- Colours
- Website: http://www.iua.edu.sd

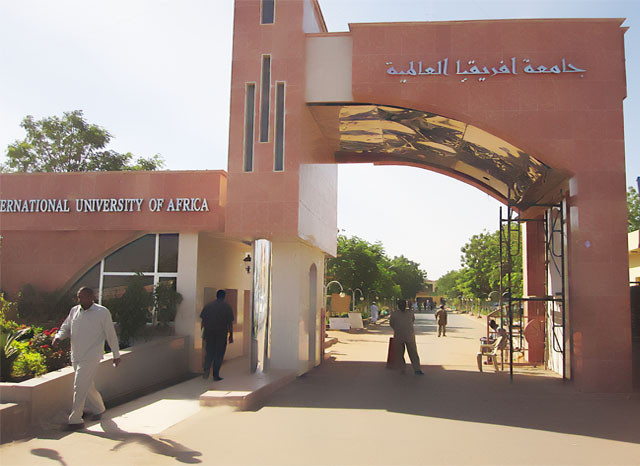
The main gate

The International University of Africa (Arabic: جامعة افريقيا العالمية) is a private university in Khartoum, Sudan. It is a member of the Federation of the Universities of the Islamic World. The university has faculties of Education and Humanities, Shariah and Islamic Studies, of Pure and Applied Sciences, Engineering and Medicine.

The university has its origins in the Islamic African Centre, established in Khartoum in 1977 with financial help from Saudi Arabia and other Arab States of the Persian Gulf to train preachers and educate young African Muslims and "imbue them with the Salafist view of Islam." In 1992, the military government of Colonel Omar Al-Bashir upgraded the institute to a university. Although the word "Islamic" was dropped from the title, Islamic studies are an important part of the curriculum. The university has been active in Islamic higher education in sub-Saharan Africa since it was created.

Due to its geographic location and cultural history, Sudan has been hosting a steady flow of people from neighbouring countries, who were either in pursuit of religious knowledge or were on their way to perform the hajj pilgrimage. (Port Sudan lies directly across the Red Sea from Mecca's port city of Jeddah.) Some pilgrims stayed behind, either with a sheikh (religious leader) or fleeing from religious persecution, which set in as a result of European colonization. Others were forced by incessant wars to seek refuge and education in Sudan. As of 2010, the university had almost 6000 students. Its 93-acre campus is located in the South-Eastern part of Khartoum State.

== History ==
=== African Islamic Center ===
The forerunner of the university, known as the African Islamic Center (also Islamic African Center or Islamic African Institute), was founded in 1977 or 1978 to train young Africans (particularly South Sudanese) in Salafist or fundamentalist interpretations of Islam. According to the university's website, it was set up by "a number of scholars ... with popular effort", while outside sources credit funding to Saudi Arabia and other Arab States of the Persian Gulf, and management by the Islamist National Islamic Front of Sudan.

According to the Oxford Islamic Studies Online, the Sudanese Islamist group National Islamic Front founded the AIC "to undertake missionary work among the non-Muslim majority in southern Sudan". Other sources indicate the training was not exclusively for Sudanese. Political scientist Gilles Kepel has described it as having been created "to train preachers and young elites from French and English-speaking African countries" and to "imbue them with the Salafist view of Islam." Kepel describes the center as "richly endowed by the Gulf States" and "headed" by a National Islamic Front party member "from 1979 on". Rachel Bronson states that starting in 1977, Saudi Arabia "poured significant resources" into the center.

According to the university's website, the Institute/Centre began by "accepting African students at the intermediate and secondary levels" from 1977-1979 onwards, before "this project was stopped". Later on, the Institute/Centre was revived "on a wider basis and with greater facilities" by the "Government of the Sudan". It "invited a number of Arab countries" to contribute and six responded—Egypt, Saudi Arabia, Kuwait, Qatar, The United Arab Emirates and Morocco. Their representatives "formed the Centre's board of trustees" (the institute's highest authority) and "drew a statute which was approved by the Government of the Sudan and ratified by the founding states".

The Government of the Sudan granted the centre a "big plot of land and the president of the Republic gave it diplomatic immunities and privileges" which helped it to develop and progress quickly. The National Salvation Government ratified the previous statute.

Between 1977 and 1986 the Institute/Centre was established and "its administration and systems were settled". 800 students could be accommodated and "hundreds" of students graduated. Teaching was expanded from intermediate and secondary levels to include two university colleges. "Social and cultural activities" included "youth cultural mission and graduates associations". In one African country, "more than 500 applicants competed for ten scholarship awards" to AIC.

But in 1405 AH (1984-5) the Centre's activity was curtailed after some member states "failed to pay their [promised] contributions", and the budget had to be cut at the same time that the two colleges were being established.

=== International University of Africa ===
In 1411 AH (1990–91), and due to the great demand of African students for higher education, the Government of the Sudan issued the following decree (according to the university website):

1. Elevating the Islamic African Centre to University statute with the name: International University of Africa.
2. Inviting interested countries and charitable institutions to become members of the Board of Trustees.
3. Ratifying the official seat agreement between the Government of the Sudan and the University and allowing it to retain the immunities and privileges granted to the Islamic African Centre.
4. The University was established with almost the full support of the Government of the Sudan, new faculties, institutes and centers were set up and study programmes became diversified including studies at applied science faculties. Programmes of post-graduate studies were introduced. The number of students multiplied greatly; and the University's internal and external relations were extended resulting in a unique international African university.

So in 1992 the institute was "upgraded" to a university and its name was changed to Africa University, or International University of Africa.

In 1995, during the civil war in Southern Sudan, Spin magazine reported that there was military training on campus. Human Rights Watch notes that among other activities it provided "religious and cultural orientation programs" for prisoners of war in Sudan.

== Structure ==
The University runs the College of Education on the island of Zanzibar, Tanzania, with a 2006 enrolment of 466 students. In 2011, according to the Centro de Ciencias Humanas y Sociales, Madrid, the university ranked 10,924 in the world. In Sudan, it ranked fifth behind the University of Khartoum, Sudan University of Science & Technology, National Ribat University and Karary University.

Officially, the chancellor of the university is the President of the country. In effect, the head of the university is the Vice-Chancellor. In November 2020, Prof. Dr. Hunud Abia Kadouf, an internationally renowned law expert, was appointed as Vice-Chancellor.

The university is legally independent from the Sudanese state, but the government is the largest financial supporter. Classes are mostly held in Arabic except the medical and Health Sciences, but most of the students come from more than 90 countries, mostly non-Arabic-speaking African nations and from other countries, such as Malaysia and Indonesia.

In 1993 and in cooperation with other organizations, the university established an institute for Disaster Management and Refugees Studies. This institute was inaugurated in 1994 at a ceremony attended by Salim Ahmed Salim, Secretary General of the Organization of African Unity. It undertakes training and development of approaches to disaster management in the Horn of Africa. In April 2011, the Vice-Chancellor of the university at that time, Professor Hassan Mekki, met the Islamic Relief Agency Secretary General, Adnan Bin Khalil Al-Basha in Jeddah, Saudi Arabia. The two signed a memorandum of understanding on cooperation in charity and relief work.

== Faculties and affiliated centers ==
- Faculty of Economics and Political Science
- Faculty of Arts
- Arabic Language Institute
- Faculty of Family Studies
- Faculty of Education
- Faculty of Pure and Applied Sciences
  - Department of Chemistry
  - Department of Physics
  - Department of Geology
  - Department of Mathematics
  - Department of Microbiology
- Faculty of Nursing Sciences
- Faculty of Medicine
- Faculty of Pharmacy
- Faculty of Medical Laboratory Science
- Faculty of Dentistry
- Faculty of Engineering
  - Civil engineering
  - Computer Engineering
  - Communications Engineering
  - Systems Engineering and Control
  - Electrical Power Engineering
- Faculty of Administrative Sciences
- Faculty of Islamic Studies
- Faculty of Shariah
  - Department of Shariah and Law
- Faculty of Media
- Faculty of Quran.
- Faculty of Family Studies.
- Faculty of Islamic Studies.
- Faculty of Computer Studies
  - Computer Science
  - Information Systems
  - Information Technology
- Research Center
- African Islamic Center
- Faculty for Disaster and Refugee Studies

== The Academic System ==
The University follows the academic semester system and credit hours. The academic degree is awarded for successful completion of the prescribed courses during the academic semesters.

These courses include:

1. University Requirements courses: "These are the compulsory courses for all university students. They include Islamic Studies, languages, and social subjects".
2. Faculty requirements: compulsory courses for all the students of the particular faculty.
3. Specialization Requirements: courses prescribed by the faculty for all the students of the same specialization.

=== Language used in instruction ===
Arabic is the medium of instruction in the faculties of economics, arts, law, education and shariah, and centres of the university on the bachelor degree level. It is also the medium of instruction and dissertation writing for post-graduate studies. English is the language of instruction in the faculties of engineering, Medicine, pharmacy, dentistry, nursing and faculties of laboratory sciences.

== University Facilities ==
The University has

- Huge Press
- University Clinic
- A large number of apartments for students
- Playgrounds for football, basketball, volleyball and other games
- Africa Conference Hall
- 3 mosques and now in the process of establishing a large mosque, at a cost of about $2 million (Turkish design)

== Students ==
As of 2010, about half of the students have come from Sudan, and most of the others from the Horn of Africa. Almost all have come from Africa, but other countries are represented, too:

| Country | 2004 | 2005 | 2006 | 2007 | 2008 | 2009 | 2010 | Total |
|---|---|---|---|---|---|---|---|---|
| Azerbaijan | 1 | 1 | - | - | - | - | - | 2 |
| Jordan | 1 | 2 | 2 | 3 | 1 | 10 | 9 | 28 |
| Brazil | - | 3 | - | - | - | 3 | 2 | 8 |
| Gabon | 1 | - | 1 | - | - | - | 1 | 3 |
| Algeria | - | - | 1 | 1 | - | 2 | 2 | 6 |
| Saudi Arabia | - | - | - | - | 1 | 1 | - | 2 |
| Senegal | 16 | 28 | 11 | 6 | 19 | 45 | 45 | 170 |
| Sudan | 409 | 648 | 697 | 1137 | 929 | 3116 | 3229 | 10165 |
| Sweden | - | - | - | 1 | - | - | 1 | 2 |
| Chechnya | - | - | - | 1 | - | - | 1 | 2 |
| Somalia | 138 | 159 | 184 | 298 | 213 | 649 | 637 | 2278 |
| China | 4 | 4 | 5 | 10 | 7 | 1 | 2 | 33 |
| Iraq | 1 | 1 | 1 | 6 | 8 | 17 | 15 | 49 |
| Philippines | 39 | 41 | 36 | 34 | 26 | 46 | 52 | 274 |
| Cameroon | 19 | 19 | 7 | 8 | 13 | 27 | 30 | 123 |
| Congo | 7 | 7 | 17 | 2 | 3 | 11 | 19 | 66 |
| Hungary | - | 1 | - | 1 | 1 | - | - | 3 |
| Morocco | 1 | - | - | - | - | - | - | 1 |
| Norway | 1 | - | - | - | - | - | - | 1 |
| Austria | - | 1 | - | - | - | - | - | 1 |
| Niger | 27 | 17 | 21 | 9 | 27 | 60 | 66 | 227 |
| India | - | 3 | 1 | 4 | - | 2 | 2 | 12 |
| Japan | 2 | - | 2 | 3 | 1 | - | - | 8 |
| Yemen | 1 | 1 | 1 | 3 | 5 | 8 | 9 | 1546 |
| Uzbekistan | - | - | - | 1 | - | - | - | 1 |
| Australia | 2 | - | - | - | - | - | - | 2 |
| Afghanistan | 2 | 1 | 1 | 4 | - | 6 | 7 | 21 |
| Albania | - | - | 1 | 1 | - | 1 | 1 | 4 |
| Germany | 2 | 3 | - | 1 | - | - | - | 6 |
| America | 2 | 1 | 2 | 6 | - | 1 | 1 | 13 |
| Angola | 1 | - | - | 2 | 2 | 3 | 3 | 11 |
| Ukraine | - | - | - | 1 | - | 1 | 1 | 3 |
| Ethiopia | 135 | 108 | 85 | 81 | 77 | 201 | 202 | 889 |
| Eritrea | 67 | 66 | 63 | 47 | 45 | 116 | 120 | 524 |
| Central Africa | - | - | 9 | 2 | 3 | 6 | 6 | 26 |
| Indonesia | 36 | 26 | 28 | 42 | 43 | 89 | 91 | 355 |
| Iran | - | - | 1 | 5 | 2 | 3 | 2 | 13 |
| Italy | 1 | - | - | - | - | - | - | 1 |
| Pakistan | - | 3 | 1 | 1 | 3 | 8 | 8 | 24 |
| Botswana | 1 | - | - | - | - | - | - | 1 |
| Britain | - | - | - | 1 | - | - | - | 1 |
| Bangladesh | 1 | - | 2 | - | - | 1 | 1 | 5 |
| Benin | - | - | 5 | 2 | 1 | 4 | 4 | 16 |
| Burkina Faso | 14 | 8 | 9 | 5 | 4 | 18 | 17 | 75 |
| Burundi | 5 | 8 | 8 | 4 | 11 | 11 | 10 | 57 |
| Thailand | 53 | 86 | 42 | 28 | 35 | 60 | 62 | 366 |
| Turkey | 6 | 58 | 20 | 49 | 55 | 30 | 30 | 248 |
| Chad | 82 | 49 | 59 | 59 | 57 | 146 | 148 | 600 |
| Tanzania | 23 | 16 | 26 | 23 | 42 | 59 | 61 | 250 |
| Togo | 8 | 11 | 4 | 3 | 4 | 4 | 5 | 39 |
| Tunisia | 1 | - | - | - | 1 | 1 | 1 | 4 |
| Comoros | 44 | 51 | 84 | 47 | 45 | 126 | 124 | 521 |
| Jamaica | 1 | - | - | - | - | - | - | 1 |
| South Africa | 4 | 1 | 1 | - | - | - | - | 6 |
| Djibouti | 55 | 35 | 19 | 56 | 22 | 101 | 99 | 387 |
| Rwanda | 11 | 1 | 9 | 1 | 8 | 13 | 12 | 55 |
| Russia | 2 | 2 | - | 2 | - | 1 | 1 | 8 |
| Zambia | 4 | 1 | 7 | 1 | 4 | 6 | 6 | 29 |
| Ivory Coast | 6 | 10 | 7 | 11 | 6 | 22 | 23 | 85 |
| Syria | - | 14 | 4 | 2 | 4 | 16 | 19 | 59 |
| Switzerland | - | - | - | - | - | 1 | 1 | 2 |
| Sierra Leone | - | 3 | 2 | 2 | 1 | 4 | 6 | 18 |
| Seralanka | - | 2 | 2 | - | - | 2 | 2 | 8 |
| Seychelles | - | - | - | 1 | - | - | - | 1 |
| Tajikistan | 4 | - | 8 | 2 | 15 | 12 | 13 | 54 |
| Gambia | 13 | - | 1 | 6 | - | 27 | 25 | 72 |
| Ghana | 7 | 15 | 13 | 11 | 3 | 31 | 31 | 111 |
| Guinea | 5 | 10 | 11 | 7 | 4 | 23 | 22 | 82 |
| Guinea Conakry | - | - | - | - | - | 3 | - | 3 |
| France | - | 2 | - | 4 | - | 2 | 2 | 10 |
| Palestine | 4 | - | 8 | 5 | 9 | 20 | 20 | 66 |
| Kyrgyzstan | - | - | - | - | 2 | 1 | 2 | 5 |
| Kirgia | - | - | - | - | 2 | 2 | - | 4 |
| Croatia | 1 | - | 1 | - | - | - | - | 2 |
| Cambodia | 3 | - | - | 2 | 2 | 3 | 2 | 12 |
| Canada | - | 1 | - | 1 | - | - | - | 2 |
| South Korea | 1 | 1 | - | - | - | - | - | 2 |
| Kenya | 58 | 43 | 88 | 84 | 121 | 208 | 200 | 802 |
| Liberia | - | 1 | 2 | - | 3 | 4 | 3 | 13 |
| Libya | 1 | - | - | - | - | 1 | 1 | 3 |
| Lesotho | - | - | - | - | 1 | - | 1 | 2 |
| Mali | 28 | 22 | 28 | 10 | 11 | 44 | 45 | 188 |
| Malaysia | 11 | 5 | 9 | 9 | 5 | 9 | 9 | 57 |
| Madagascar | 9 | 1 | 1 | - | - | - | - | 11 |
| Egypt | 1 | 3 | 3 | 2 | 1 | 5 | 6 | 21 |
| Mlacasi | 1 | - | - | - | - | - | - | 1 |
| Malawi | - | 3 | 1 | 9 | 2 | 13 | 13 | 41 |
| Moldova | 1 | - | - | - | - | - | - | 1 |
| Mauritania | 1 | - | 1 | 1 | 2 | 11 | 11 | 27 |
| Mozambique | 8 | 5 | 6 | 6 | 12 | 13 | 15 | 65 |
| Nigeria | 65 | 92 | 94 | 112 | 105 | 199 | 193 | 860 |
| Uganda | 27 | 35 | 47 | 27 | 24 | 64 | 61 | 283 |
| Total | 1478 | 1746 | 1810 | 2320 | 2053 | 5754 | 5870 | 21031 |

== Foreign Relations of the University ==
The university is a member of:

- World Association of Universities IAU
- Association of Arab Universities AARU
- Federation of the Universities of the Islamic World FUIW
- Union of African Universities AAU
- World Health Organization WHO
- ECFMG Medical School Web Portal and Foundation for Advancement of International Medical Education and Research IMED.
- Accredited through Sudan Medical Council by World Federation for Medical Education WFME.
- Union of Sudanese universities

There are also bilateral agreements for scientific and cultural cooperation with the following Islamic and international universities and academic institutions:

- King Faisal University N’djamena, Chad.
- International Federation for Arabic and Islamic Schools.
- International Islamic University Malaysia.
- Al-Albeit University Jordan.
- Islamic University Niger.
- Mbalie University Uganda.
- University of South Africa UNISA.
- Faculty of Shari ‘a Sarajevo.
- Kaneme College Nigeria.
- University College of Education Zanzibar (academically affiliated with the International University of Africa which awards the bachelor's degree to its graduates).
- Thika College for Shari‘a and Islamic Studies –Kenny (academically affiliated with the International University of Africa which awards the bachelor's degree to its graduates).
- Al-Hikmah University Ilorin- Nigeria.
- Kesaunee College (Nigeria).
- East Africa University Bosaso- Somalia.
- Prince of Songkla University- Thailand.
- International Islamic University Islamabad- Pakistan.
- Banader University Somalia.
- University of Addis Ababa Ethiopia.
- Burundi Islamic University Komebo Burundi.
- The International Organization for Memorizing they Holy Quran Islamic World Association.
- Uyun El-Hayat Charity Project.
- Immigrant Student Care Organization.
- World Assembly of Muslim Youth (WAMY).
- The Cooperation Office for Da’awa and Guidance Ivory Coast.
- Sheikh Ali Katarjoghli (Turkish businessman) for building the Uthmanic Mosque.
- Abd Allah Hashim ‘Urwa Company Kingdom of Saudi Arabia –academic scholarships.
- Katsina Province Nigeria academic scholarships.
- Bar‘u University Somalia.
- The Association for Muslim Preachers Seralion academic scholarships
- The Shafi‘iyean Islamic University Jakarta- Indonesia.
- University of Zanzibar.
- Arabic Reformatory College Sri Lanka.
- Khanan Chinese University for Alternative Traditional Medicine Sciences

== See also ==
- List of Islamic educational institutions
- List of universities in Sudan
- List of universities in Africa
- Education in Sudan
