= Wadi Seidna =

Place in Khartoum state, Sudan

Wadi Seidna وادي سيّدنا
- Location in Sudan
- Coordinates: 15°49′39″N 32°31′35″E
- Country: Sudan
- State: Khartoum
- City: Omdurman
- Elevation: 383 m (1,257 ft)
- Time zone: Central Africa Time, GMT + 3
- Geocode: 364126

Wadi Seidna (Arabic: وادي سيّدنا, romanized: wadi sayyidna), also spelled Wadi Sayyidna, is a wadi located in north of Omdurman, in Khartoum State, Sudan. It is notable for its association with the Sudanese Military Academy and Wadi Seidna Air Base, which has been a subject of rescue missions and operations, including those carried out by the Indian Air Force to evacuate personnel during the 2023 war in Sudan.

The land around Wadi Seidna is flat, and is covered in the lower east. The highest place in the area has an altitude of 434 meters and is 2.5 km south of Wadi Seidna. There are about 47 people per square kilometer around Wadi Seidna, a relatively small population. The nearest larger town is Omdurman, 17.8 km south of Wadi Seidna. The area around Wadi Seidna is almost covered with houses. In the region around Wadi Seidna, islands, and hills are remarkably common.

Wadi Seidna, Omdurman

Climate chart (precipitation, max. and min. temperature)
J	F	M	A	M	J	J	A	S	O	N	D
1 32 15	1 37 17	1 41 20	2 45 25	11 44 25	13 41 26	66 39 25	113 34 24	31 40 25	8 44 26	1 40 24	1 35 20
- █ Average max. and min. temperatures in °C
- █ Precipitation totals in mm
- Source: NASA
Imperial conversion
J	F	M	A	M	J	J	A	S	O	N	D
0 90 59	0 99 63	0 106 68	0.1 113 77	0.4 111 77	0.5 106 79	2.6 102 77	4.4 93 75	1.2 104 77	0.3 111 79	0 104 75	0 95 68
- █ Average max. and min. temperatures in °F
- █ Precipitation totals in inches

The climate is hot. The average temperature is 31 °C (88 °F). The hottest month is April, at 35 °C (95 °F), and the coldest is January, at 24 °C (75 °F). The average rainfall is 248 millimeters per year. The wettest month is August, with 113 millimeters of rain, and the driest is January, with 1 millimeter.
