= Sudanese Navy =

Maritime warfare branch of Sudan's military

- Arabic: القوات البحرية السودانية
- Sudanese Navy Emblem
- Founded: 1962
- Country: Sudan
- Type: Navy
- Role: Naval Warfare
- Size: 2,000 personnel (2021 est.); 20 ships
- Part of: Sudanese Armed Forces
- Headquarters: Port Sudan
- Engagements: First Sudanese Civil War; Second Sudanese Civil War; Conflict in the Two Areas; Sudanese Civil War

Commanders
- Chief of the Naval Staff: Vice Admiral Mahjoub Bushra

The Sudanese Navy (Arabic: القوات البحرية السودانية, romanized: Al-Quwwat Al-Bahriyya al-Sudaniyya) is the naval warfare branch of the Sudanese Armed Forces. Responsible for defending Sudan's Red Sea coastline, territorial waters, and inland waterways. It is the smallest branch of the Sudanese military. Its primary headquarters is located in the strategic port city of Port Sudan.

== History ==
=== Foundation ===
The Sudanese Navy was established in 1962, six years after Sudan's independence, to protect its nascent maritime interests. The initial fleet was minimal, consisting of a handful of small patrol boats.

=== Fleet Expansion under Nimeiry ===
A significant phase of expansion occurred under the regime of President Gaafar Nimeiry in the 1970s. Recognizing the strategic importance of the Red Sea and the need to secure Sudan's 750 km coastline, the government sought to rapidly develop naval capabilities. Nimeiry's government pursued a pragmatic foreign policy, engaging with both Eastern and Western blocs for military hardware.

Sudanese Navy Flag

To this end, Sudan consulted with and acquired vessels from both Yugoslavia and the Soviet Union; A key early partner, Yugoslavia supplied the navy with its first significant offshore patrol vessels. This included two Kraljevica-class patrol boats, which formed the backbone of the early blue-water fleet. This partnership was part of a broader relationship where Yugoslavia, under Josip Broz Tito, provided military and technical assistance to non-aligned nations.

Concurrently, Sudan engaged with the USSR, acquiring several Poluchat-class torpedo boats and Osa-class missile boats in the early 1970s. These acquisitions marked a brief period of Soviet influence in Sudan's military, providing the navy with its first missile-armed fast attack craft. However, this cooperation was short-lived, as Nimeiry's alignment with the West and Egypt following the 1971 communist coup attempt against him led to a sharp decline in Soviet-Sudanese relations.

This period of diversification allowed the Sudanese Navy to quickly establish a credible, if small, coastal defense force.

=== Later modernization ===
Throughout the latter half of the 20th century, the navy's role was largely constabulary, focused on anti-smuggling operations and port security. It saw limited involvement in the First and Second Sudanese Civil Wars, primarily conducting riverine patrols on the Nile to interdict rebel movements and supply lines.

Following the secession of South Sudan in 2011, Sudan lost a significant portion of its Nile river frontage, shifting the navy's strategic focus more decisively towards the Red Sea. The protection of key economic assets, such as the Port Sudan harbor and Sudan's Exclusive Economic Zone, became its primary mission.

In the 21st century, the navy has sought to modernize its aging fleet. It has acquired several new patrol vessels, notably from China and Iran, to enhance its blue-water patrol capabilities.

During the ongoing War in Sudan that began in April 2023, the navy and its headquarters in Port Sudan have been under the control of the Sudanese Armed Forces loyal to General Abdel Fattah al-Burhan. The port has become a critical lifeline for the government, handling humanitarian aid and serving as a de facto temporary capital.

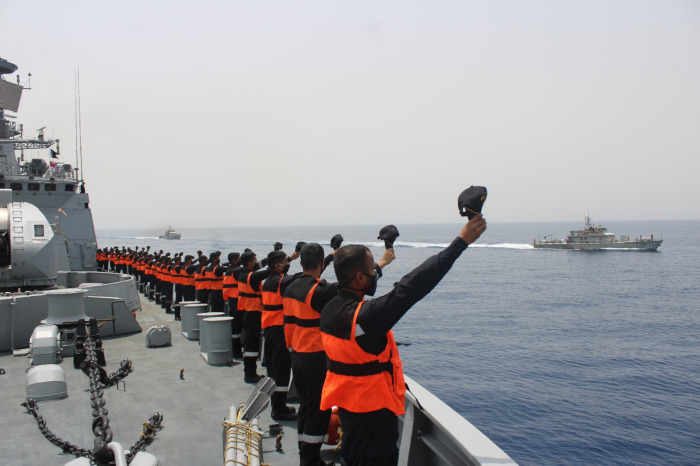
The Indian sailors aboard the INS Tabar salutes the Sudanese Nimer in 2021

== Structure and Fleet ==
The Sudanese Navy is a compact force with an estimated 2,000 personnel. Its structure is divided between coastal power squadrons and riverine units. There exists a Marine Infantry Command but it is under the Army's command not the Navy's.

The fleet is mainly focused on patrol and coastal defense. As of 2021, the primary inventory included:

Class	Type	Origin	Vessel	References
Kurmuk (Project 22460)	Missile Corvette	Russia	Kurmuk (111) Al Qadarif (112)	
Swiftships 35m	Patrol Craft	United States	Shendi (P401) Al-Fashir (P402)	
Al-Marat	Fast Attack Craft (Missile)	Iran	Al-Marat (P504)	
Safeya-class	Fast Attack Craft (Gun)	Iran	Safeya (P502) Hunud (P503)	
Tamai	special operation craft	Sudan	locally manufactured	
Trinkitat	Interceptor Craft	Sudan	locally manufactured	
Agig	Interceptor Craft	Sudan	locally manufactured	
Mil Mi-2	Utility Helicopter	Russia	2	

The following table lists significant vessels that were in service during the 20th century but are now assessed as retired, scrapped, or lost.

Class	Type	Origin	Hull Number	Status	References
Osa I (Project 205)	Fast Attack Craft (Missile)	Soviet Union	P501 (likely)	Retired	
Poluchat I (Project 368)	Torpedo Boat	Soviet Union	—	Retired	
Kraljevica-class	Patrol Boat	Yugoslavia	—	Scrapped	
Yugoslav Type 131	Minesweeper	Yugoslavia	—	Retired	
Shershen (Project 206)	Torpedo Boat	Soviet Union	—	Scrapped	

The main naval bases are located at:

- Port Sudan (Primary Base and HQ)
- Flamingo Bay (Near Port Sudan)
- Khartoum (Riverine Base on the Nile)

== See also ==
- Sudanese Armed Forces
- Port Sudan
- Red Sea
