= Kigab =

Kigab (Arabic: كيجاب) is an Arabic surname. Notable people with the surname include:

- Abu Kigab (born 1998), Sudanese-Canadian basketball player, son of Sultan
- Sultan Kigab (1955–2024), Sudanese-Canadian marathon swimmer
