= Holy Cross Catholic Secondary School (St. Catharines) =

Location
- 460 Linwell Road. St. Catharines, Ontario, L2M 2P9; Canada; 43°12′9.03″N 79°13′4.29″W

Information
- Type: Secondary school
- Motto: Spes Unica (Speds Unite)
- Founded: 1985
- School board: Niagara Catholic District School Board
- Principal: Deanna Williams
- Grades: 9-12
- Enrollment: approx. 550
- Language: English
- Colours: Green, silver, white
- Mascot: Angus
- Team name: Raiders
- Website: holycrossraiders.com

Holy Cross is a Catholic secondary school in St. Catharines, Ontario. The school is administered by the Niagara Catholic District School Board.

== History ==
Holy Cross was founded in 1985. Originally known as P.K. Kerwin (named after an area lawyer who had donated the property the school was constructed on), it was built at 541 Lake Street, as a senior Elementary School, serving only grades seven and eight. Grades nine and ten were later added, but in 1984, grade 11 classes were offered under the name of Denis Morris Catholic High School, Kerwin Campus. In September 1985, re-christened as Holy Cross Secondary School, the facility now offered grade twelve classes as well, while grades seven and eight had been eliminated. In 1993, due to overcrowding, Holy Cross relocated to the former Grantham High School building, which was shut down by the District School Board of Niagara that same year due to declining enrollment. The former Holy Cross building would become St. Francis Catholic Secondary School.

== In 2015 ==
In 2015, Jean-Paul Dupont, and in 2019, Catherine Chin Yet, teachers at Holy Cross Catholic Secondary School, were awarded the Prime Minister's Awards for Teaching Excellence.

== Sports ==
=== Lacrosse ===
Between 1996 and 2011, the school had just two losses in Niagara region play. The team is currently coached by NLL player Mike Accursi and physical education teacher Dave Walker. The team was ranked #1 in Canada for three years straight on Laxpower (2007–2009), and were ranked #124 in North America as of June 6, 2009.

Championships:

- Twelve Niagara Region AAA/AAAA championships: 1997–2001, 2003, 2005–2009.
- Three OFSAA championships:
- 1997 - Fourth
- 1998 - Silver
- 1999 - Gold
- 2000 - Silver
- 2001 - Gold
- 2002 - Bronze
- 2003 - Bronze
- 2005 - Gold
- 2006 - Silver
- 2007 - Bronze
- 2008 - Bronze
- 2009 - Silver
- 2010 - Silver (A/AA division)

=== Hockey ===
The Holy Cross hockey team has had various success in Southern Ontario play in recent years. They won the SOSSA championship three years in a row (2000–2002), and again in 2008 (now in the A-AA division.)

in 2019 the Girls varsity hockey team were crowned SOSSA champions after going undefeated. They were favorited to win the OFSA championship. However, the remaining competitions were cancelled due to COVID-19.

== Notable alumni ==
- Craig Conn (2001), lacrosse player
- Rob Davison, hockey player
- Kristen French, murder victim of Karla Homolka and Paul Bernardo
- Sean Greenhalgh (2000), lacrosse player
- Steve Priolo, professional lacrosse player
- Corey Small (2005), lacrosse player
- Billy Dee Smith, lacrosse player
- Matt Vinc (2000), lacrosse player
- Buffy-Lynne Williams (1995), rower
- Mohammed Jabarah (1999), Al-Qaeda linked terrorist

== See also ==
- Education in Ontario
- List of secondary schools in Ontario
