= Sultan Kigab =

Sudanese-Canadian swimmer (1955–2024)

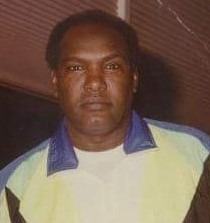
- Kigab in 1996

Personal information
- Native name: عبدالمجيد سلطان كيجاب
- Nationality: Sudanese / Canadian (since 1979)
- Born: Abd el-Magid Sultan Kigab; 1955 Al-Ghaba, Northern State, Sudan
- Died: 17 October 2024 (aged 68–69) New York City, U.S.
- Education: Neelain University
- Years active: 1970s–1980s
- Height: 6 ft 8 in (203 cm)
- Spouse: Mashair Suwar al-Dhahab
- Children: 4, including Abu Kigab

Sport
- Country: Sudan
- Sport: Marathon swimming Long-distance swimming
- Rank: 32 (1973); 20 (1977); 11 (1981)

Abd el-Magid Sultan Kigab (Arabic: عبدالمجيد سلطان كيجاب; 1955 – 17 October 2024), known as Sultan Kigab, was a Sudanese-Canadian marathon swimmer and presidential candidate.

After studying Law at Cairo University (Khartoum branch), Kigab embarked on a successful swimming career, representing Sudan internationally. He competed in the Maratona del Golfo Capri-Napoli (Italy), Latakia International Swimming Race (Syria), and Canadian World Championships, among others. In 1974, he won Sudan's Jabal Awliya race, one of the world's longest, and continued participating in national and international events, winning numerous medals. Kigab later coached swimming in Canada and Saudi Arabia, and in 1996, he ran for Sudan's presidency, coming second to Omar al-Bashir. Kigab was known for being a "showman".

== Early life and education ==
Abd El Magid Sultan Muhammad Salih Kigab was born in 1955 in Al-Ghaba district in the Northern State, Sudan to Sultan Muhammed Salih. He completed secondary school in Tangasy at an Evangelical school. He studied Law at Cairo University, Khartoum branch (today's Neelain University).

== Swimming career ==
Kigab started his career as a percussionist and choir member with Naam Adam, Ishag Karamallah and Zaki Abdul Karim in 1962. He was a swimmer from a young age. In 1967, he joined the Graduate Club and participated in the short-distance and water polo championships; then he went to long-distance swimming alongside Fathi Bayram, Huda Hamdi, Hiba Mohamed Ali, Mona Karrar, and Sara Gadalla Gubara, and has proven his worth in endurance and sprint races. In 1969, he was chosen to represent Sudan in the Maratona del Golfo Capri-Napoli race (36 km (22 mi)) in Italy, along with his colleague Mohamud Mustafa and Fadel Suleiman.

In 1970, he joined the Al-Merrikh swimming club. In October of the same year, he represented Sudan in the Latakia International Swimming Race in Syria in 1971.

He was chosen in 1972 to compete at the Flower Show in the Canadian town of Mestine. After that, Canada invited him to represent Sudan in the Canadian World Championships. He continued to participate in all the following seven Canadian World Championships where he swam the 24-hour relay ace. In 1973, he came 9th, swimming 46 mi (74 km) in the La Tuque, Quebec race and 32 (out of 35) overall in the World Professional Marathon Swimming Federation (WPMSF) rankings.

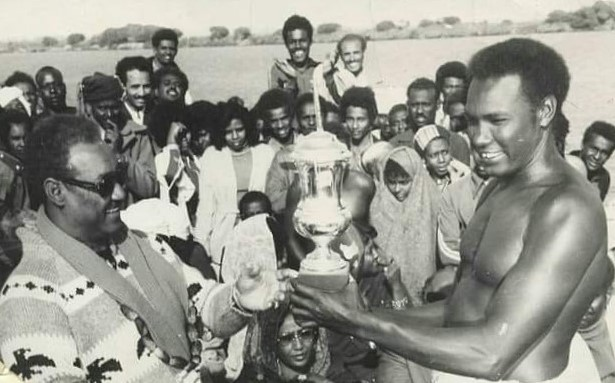
President Jaafar Nimeiry handing over the winner cup in 1974

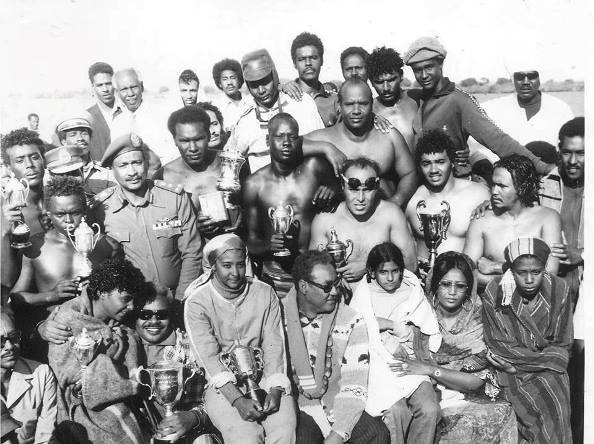
Sudan Independence Holidays race participants in 1978. In the middle first row is President Jaafar Nimeiry, Sara Gadalla Gubara is to his left, and Kigab is behind Sarah on the second row

In June 1974, he established and competed in the Jabal Awliya race (50 km (31 mi)), one of the world's longest races, which started from Jabal Awliya dam on the Blue Nile and ends at the TV Building in Omdurman. There, he came first, covering the distance in 13 hours, followed by Salim and Sara Gubara. In the Atbara race (30 km (19 mi)) and 1974 Wad Madani to Um-Sunat (30 km (19 mi)) race, where 30 swimmers participated, he came first. In the 1978 race from Wad Nemari to Dongola (30 km (19 mi)), held during the Independence holidays, he also came in first place. He participated in most of the national swims, Al-Alefon to Khartoum race, Mount Olya, Al-Hudaybah to Atbara, Al-Qamar to Abu Rouf, and the Unity Festival races.

In 1975, Kigab claimed to participate in the 100th anniversary of the first English swimmer across the English Channel in 1875 in the English city of Folkestone. In 1978, Kigab tried to cross the English Channel, but he gave up 2 mi (3.2 km) from the French coast. Kigab tried again and failed. Kigab claimed to have crossed the Channel on a different attempt in 11 hours and half, which is not mentioned at the official full list of successful Channel swims, records, statistics and swimmer information.

In 1977, Kigab was ranked 20 (out of 21) on WPMSF rankings after coming 13 (out of 14) in Chibougamau race, Quebec, that was on 10 July. The race had a distance of 10 mi (16 km) and he finished in 05:11:10. On 12 August 1979, he did not finish the Traversée Internationale du lac Memphrémagog in Quebec.

In 1981, he was ranked 11 (out of 16) on the WPMSF rankings, after coming last in the Luxor, Egypt, race which was on 10 May and Port Said race on 2 October, and 11 (out of 12) in La Tuque, Canada, race (24 km (15 mi)) which was on 19 July. The final race in Alexandria was cancelled due to the assassination of Anwar Sadat. James Kegley, an Honour Swimmer in the International Marathon Swimming Hall of Fame, remembers Kigab running to him while screaming "Sadat has been shot!". On 29 July 1984, Kigab participated in the Traversée internationale du lac St-Jean in Quebec, Canada, but did not finish.

Kigab claimed to have crossed the Saginas Lake in 15 hours 3 time, and participated in the Montreal International Swimming Championships 4 times, the Leg Sangan 3 times, the Chicago World Race in Lake Michigan, USA, the Loth Cabot World Race in Mexico, all Egypt's international races: the Nile Race, the Suez Canal Race, and the Luxor Race. He crossed the 50 km (31 mi) wide Lake Magog 4 times. He participated in the Iraqi Championship for short-distance swimming, which was held in 1994, with his fellow swimmer Majid Talaat Farid, heading the swimming expedition. Kigab claimed to have won 126 awards, cups, medals, shields, and certificates, throughout his sports career.

== After retirement ==
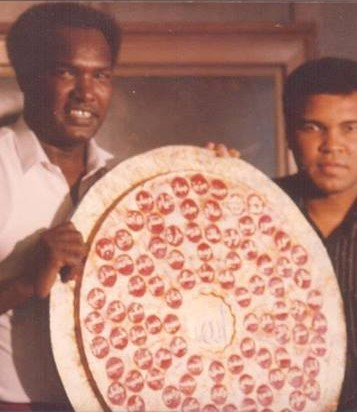
Muhammad Ali and Kigab during Ali's visit to Sudan in 1988

According to Kigab, he persuaded Muhammad Ali, to visit Sudan in 1988, during which Ali visited refugee camps and to raise awareness about the Second Sudanese Civil War-induced famine. Islamic Dawa Organization, among others, also took credit for organising Ali's visit.

=== Presidential candidacy ===
In 1996, Kigab recalled visiting a relative in Khartoum when he watched an interview on Sudan TV featuring Colonel Mohamed al-Amin Khalifa, then-president of the National Transitional Council, discussing election requirements. Realising he met the criteria, Kigab says he went to the Elections Commission Headquarters, where he informed Lieutenant General Abbas Madani of his intention to run for the presidency. Madani, surprised, asked if he truly wanted to compete with Omar al-Bashir, to which Kigab confidently replied, 'yes.' Madani provided him with the candidacy form and encouraged him to begin his campaign. Kigab then sought support from Umma Party leader Sadiq al-Mahdi and later contacted former President Jaafar Nimeiri in Cairo, who assured Kigab that he and the Mayo regime would stand by him.

In the 1996 Sudanese general election, Kigab and 39 other candidates ran against incumbent Omar al-Bashir, who toppled the democratically elected government in the 1989 coup d'état. Al-Bashir and emerged victorious with 75.4% of the vote. Opposition parties boycotted the elections, and due to the Second Sudanese Civil War, no voting took place in 11 southern states. Kigab ran as an independent, and The New York Times described his candidacy as a "charade", which he denied.

== Personal life and death ==
Kigab was married to Mashair al-Gaide Suwar al-Dhahab from al-Ghaddar, Northern State, Sudan. She is the granddaughter of Satti Majid, known as Shaykh al-Islam in North America for spreading Islam in United States during the interwar period. Together they have 2 daughters and 2 sons, Abu Haef, Buthina, Nazek and Nawaf. Abu Haef, known as Abu Kigab, is a professional basketball player who was key in Canada winning the FIBA Under-19 World Cup in 2017.

Kigab became a Canadian citizen in 1979, and lived between Canada and Sudan. He was known for being a "real showman".

Kigab died following a brief illness in New York City, on 17 October 2024. His death was mourned by the Transitional Sovereignty Council.
