= 1996 Sudanese general election =

← 1986	2–17 March 1996	2000 →
- Presidential election
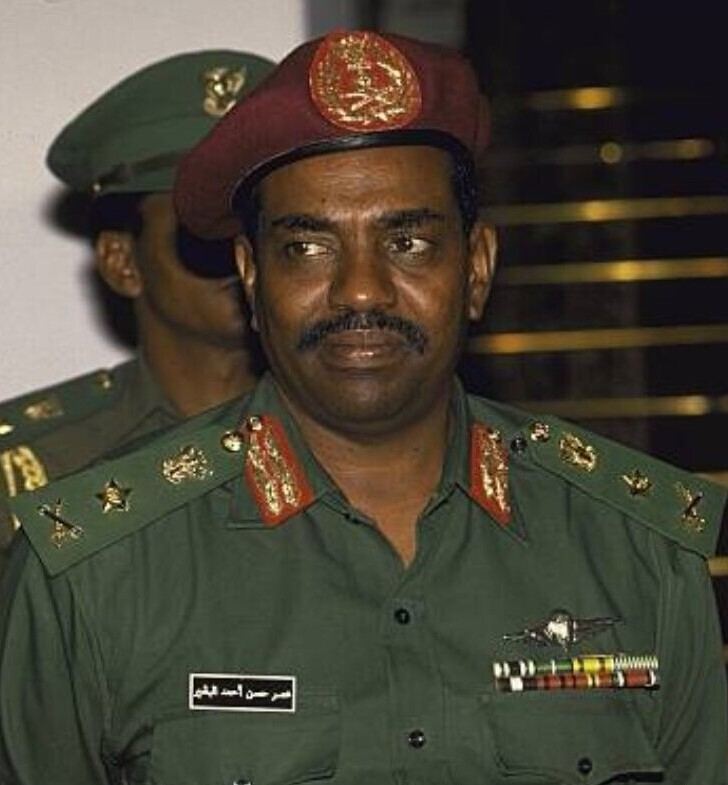

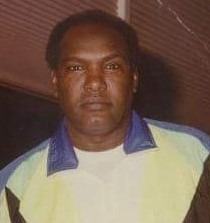
Candidate	Omar al-Bashir	Abd al-Majid Sultan Kijab
Party	Independent	Independent
Popular vote	4,181,784	133,032
Percentage	75.68%	2.41%
President before election
Omar al-Bashir
Military
Elected President
Omar al-Bashir
Independent

General elections were held in Sudan to elect a President and National Assembly between 2 and 17 March 1996. They were the first elections since 1986 due to a military coup in 1989, and the first simultaneous elections for the presidency and National Assembly. 125 members of the 400-seat National Assembly had been nominated before the election, leaving 275 seats to be elected (of which 51 were ultimately uncontested). 900 candidates ran for the 275 seats. There were no political parties at the time, and all candidates ran as independents.

In the presidential election, 40 candidates ran against incumbent Omar al-Bashir, who emerged victorious with 76% of the vote. Opposition groups boycotted the elections, claiming they were unfair. Because of the civil war, no voting took place in 11 Southern districts.

Voter turnout was reported to be 72%.

== Results ==
=== President ===
Candidate	Votes	%
Omar al-Bashir	4,181,784	75.68
Abd al-Majid Sultan Kijab	133,032	2.41
39 other candidates	1,210,464	21.91
Total	5,525,280	100.00
Valid votes	5,525,280	94.58
Invalid/blank votes	316,755	5.42
Total votes	5,842,035	100.00
Registered voters/turnout	8,110,650	72.03
Source: Nohlen et al., African Election Database

=== National Assembly ===
Party	Seats
Independents	400
Total	400
Source: IPU
