= Hosh Bannaga =

Village in Sudan

Hosh Bannaga حوش بانقا
- Town
- Location of Hosh Bannaga in Sudan
- Coordinates: 16°39′45″N 33°21′18″E
- Country: Sudan
- State: River Nile
- Time zone: UTC+2 (CAT)

Hosh Bannaga (Arabic: حوش بانقا, romanized: Ḥawsh Bānaqā) is a village located in the outskirts of Shendi on the east bank of the Nile River in the River Nile state, around 150 kilometres north of the capital Khartoum. It is the birthplace of former President Omar al-Bashir.
