= Omar al-Bashir =

Leader of Sudan from 1989 to 2019

- عمر البشير
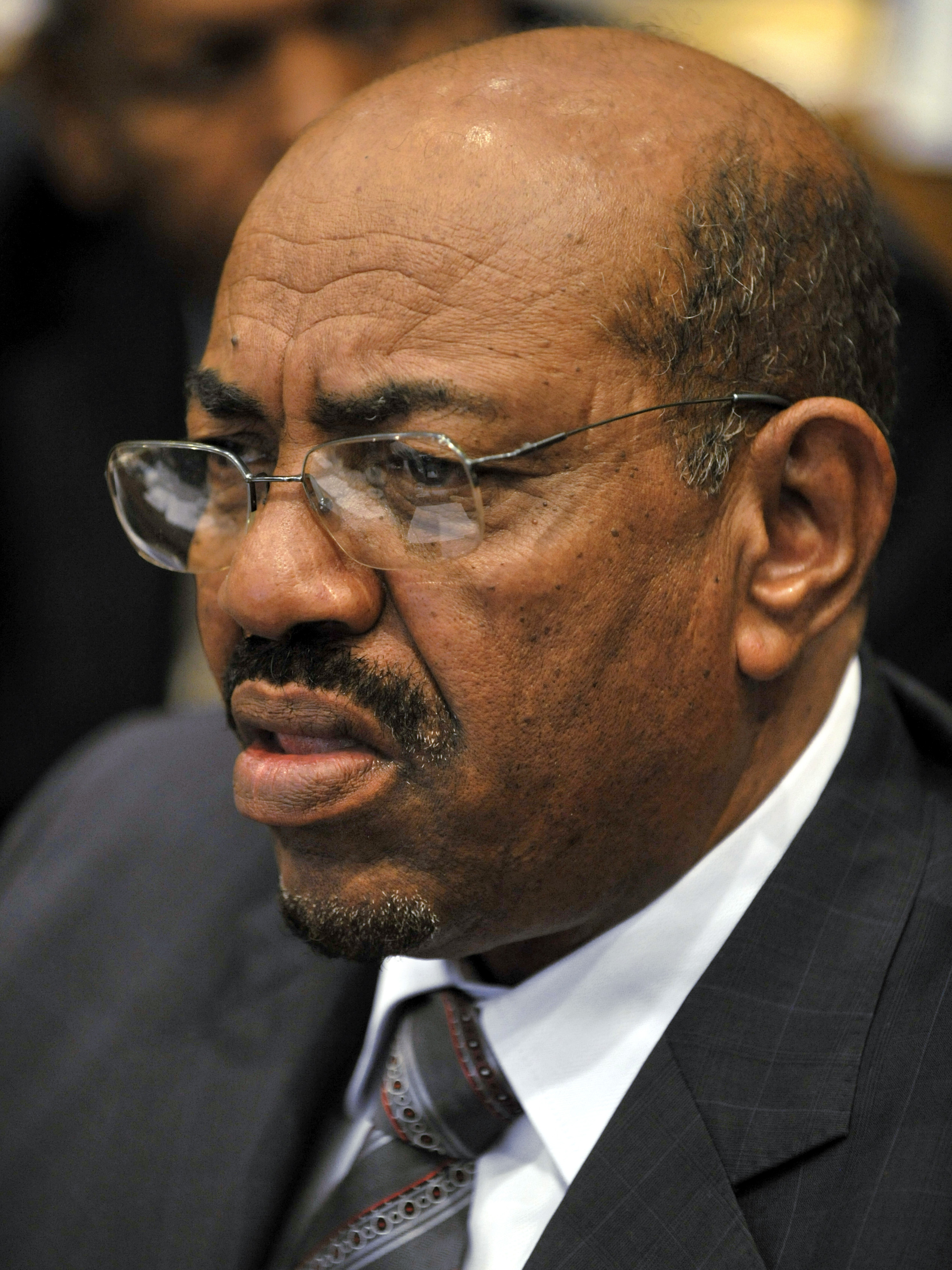
- Al-Bashir in 2009

4th President of Sudan
- In office 16 October 1993 – 11 April 2019
- Prime Minister: See list: Bakri Hassan Saleh; Motazz Moussa; Mohamed Tahir Ayala
- Vice President: See list: First Vice Presidents; Zubair Mohamed Salih; Ali Osman Taha; John Garang; Salva Kiir; Ali Osman Taha; Bakri Hassan Saleh; Ahmed Awad Ibn Auf; Second Vice Presidents; George Kongor Arop; Moses Kacoul Machar; Ali Osman Taha; Al-Haj Adam Youssef; Hassabu Mohd. Abdalrahman; Osman Mohamed Yousif Kibir
- Preceded by: Himself (as Chairman of the RCCNS)
- Succeeded by: Ahmed Awad Ibn Auf (as Chairman of the Transitional Military Council)

Chairman of the Revolutionary Command Council for National Salvation
- In office 30 June 1989 – 16 October 1993
- Deputy: Zubair Mohamed Salih
- Preceded by: Ahmed al-Mirghani (as President)
- Succeeded by: Himself (as President)

Personal details
- Born: Omar Hassan Ahmad al-Bashir; 1 January 1944 (age 82) Hosh Bannaga, Sudan
- Party: National Congress Party (1998–2019)
- Spouses: Fatima Khalid; Widad Babiker Omer
- Education: Egyptian Military College

Military service
- Allegiance: Republic of Sudan (1960–1969); Democratic Republic of Sudan (1969–1985); Republic of Sudan (1985–2019)
- Branch: Sudanese Army
- Service years: 1960–2019
- Rank: Field Marshal
- Commands: Sudanese Armed Forces
- Battles: First Sudanese Civil War; Yom Kippur War; First Congo War; Second Sudanese Civil War; War in Darfur; Heglig Crisis

Criminal details
- Criminal information
- Status: Claimed by ICC
- Convictions: Money laundering Corruption
- Penalty: Two years in prison

Details
- Date apprehended: 17 April 2019
- Imprisoned at: Incarcerated at the Kobar Prison, Khartoum, Sudan

Omar Hassan Ahmad al-Bashir (Note: Arabic: عمر حسن أحمد البشير, romanized: ʿUmar Ḥasan ʾAḥmad al-Bashīr, pronounced [ba'ʃiːr]) (born 1 January 1944) is a Sudanese former military officer and politician who served as head of state of Sudan under various titles from 1989 until 2019, when he was deposed in a coup d'état. He was subsequently imprisoned, tried and convicted on multiple corruption charges.

Al-Bashir came to power in 1989 when, as a brigadier general in the Sudanese Army, he led a group of officers supported by National Islamic Front (NIF) in a military coup that ousted the democratically elected government of prime minister Sadiq al-Mahdi after it began negotiations with rebels in the south; he subsequently replaced President Ahmed al-Mirghani as head of state. He was elected three times as president in elections that have been under scrutiny for electoral fraud. In 1998, al-Bashir founded the National Congress Party (NCP), which remained the dominant political party in the country until 2019. In March 2009, al-Bashir became the first sitting head of state to be indicted by the International Criminal Court (ICC), for allegedly directing a campaign of mass killing, rape, and pillage against civilians in Darfur. On 11 February 2020, the Government of Sudan announced that it had agreed to hand over al-Bashir to the ICC for trial.

In October 2005, al-Bashir's government negotiated an end to the Second Sudanese Civil War, leading to a referendum in the south, resulting in the separation of the south as the country of South Sudan. In the Darfur region, he oversaw the War in Darfur that resulted in death tolls of around 10,000 according to the Sudanese Government, but most sources suggest between 200,000 and 400,000. During his presidency, there were several violent struggles between the Janjaweed militia and rebel groups such as the Sudanese Liberation Army (SLA) and the Justice and Equality Movement (JEM) in the form of guerrilla warfare in the Darfur region. The civil war displaced over 2.5 million people out of a total population of 6.2 million in Darfur and created a crisis in the diplomatic relations between Sudan and Chad. The rebels in Darfur lost the support from Libya after the death of Muammar Gaddafi and the collapse of his regime in 2011.

In July 2008, the prosecutor of the International Criminal Court (ICC), Luis Moreno Ocampo, accused al-Bashir of genocide, crimes against humanity, and war crimes in Darfur. The court issued an arrest warrant for al-Bashir on 4 March 2009 on counts of war crimes and crimes against humanity, but ruled that there was insufficient evidence to prosecute him for genocide. However, on 12 July 2010, the court issued a second warrant containing three separate counts of genocide. The new warrant, like the first, was delivered to the Sudanese government, which did not recognize either the warrant or the ICC. The indictments did not allege that Bashir personally took part in such activities; instead, they said that he was "suspected of being criminally responsible, as an indirect co-perpetrator". The court's decision was opposed by the African Union, Arab League and Non-Aligned Movement as well as many African and Asian governments.

From December 2018 onwards, al-Bashir faced large-scale protests which demanded his removal from power. On 11 April 2019, Bashir was ousted in a military coup d'état. In September 2019, Bashir was replaced by the Transitionary Military Council which transferred executive power to a mixed civilian–military Sovereignty Council and a civilian prime minister, Abdalla Hamdok. Two months later, the Forces of Freedom and Change alliance (which holds indirect political power during the 39-month Sudanese transition to democracy), Hamdok, and Sovereignty Council member Siddiq Tawer stated that Bashir would be eventually transferred to the ICC. He was convicted of corruption in December of that year and sentenced to two years in prison.

== Early and family life ==
Al-Bashir was born on 1 January 1944 in Hosh Bannaga, a village on the outskirts of Shendi, just north of the capital, Khartoum, to a family that hails from the Ja'alin tribe of northern Sudan. (Note: Sudan was a condominium of the United Kingdom and Egypt at the time of Al-Bashir's birth) His mother was Hedieh Mohamed al-Zain, who died in 2019. His father, Hassan ibn Ahmed, was a smalltime dairy farmer. He is the second among twelve brothers and sisters; his younger brother Othman was killed in South Sudan during his presidency. His uncle, Al Taib Mustafa, was a journalist, politician, and noted opponent of South Sudan. As a boy, he was nicknamed 'Omeira' – Little Omar. He belongs to the Banu Bedaria, a Bedouin tribe belonging to the larger Ja'alin coalition, a Sudanese Arab tribe in middle north of Sudan (once a part of the Kingdom of Egypt and Sudan). As a child, Al-Bashir loved football. "Always in defense," a cousin of Omar's said. "That's why he went into the army." He received his primary education at the Sudanese Military College, and his family later moved to Khartoum North where he completed his secondary education and became a supporter of Al-Hilal. Al-Bashir is married to his cousin Fatima Khalid. He also has a second wife named Widad Babiker Omer, who had a number of children with her first husband Ibrahim Shamsaddin, a member of the Revolutionary Command Council for National Salvation who had died in a helicopter crash. Al-Bashir does not have any children of his own.

In 1975, al-Bashir was sent to the United Arab Emirates as the Sudanese military attaché. When he returned home, al-Bashir was made a garrison commander. In 1981, al-Bashir returned to his paratroop background when he became the commander of an armored parachute brigade.

The Sudanese Ministry of Defense website says that al-Bashir was in the Western Command from 1967 to 1969 and then the Airborne Forces from 1969 to 1987 until he was appointed commander of the 8th Infantry Brigade (independent) from 1987 to 30 June 1989.

== Presidency ==
=== Coup d'état ===
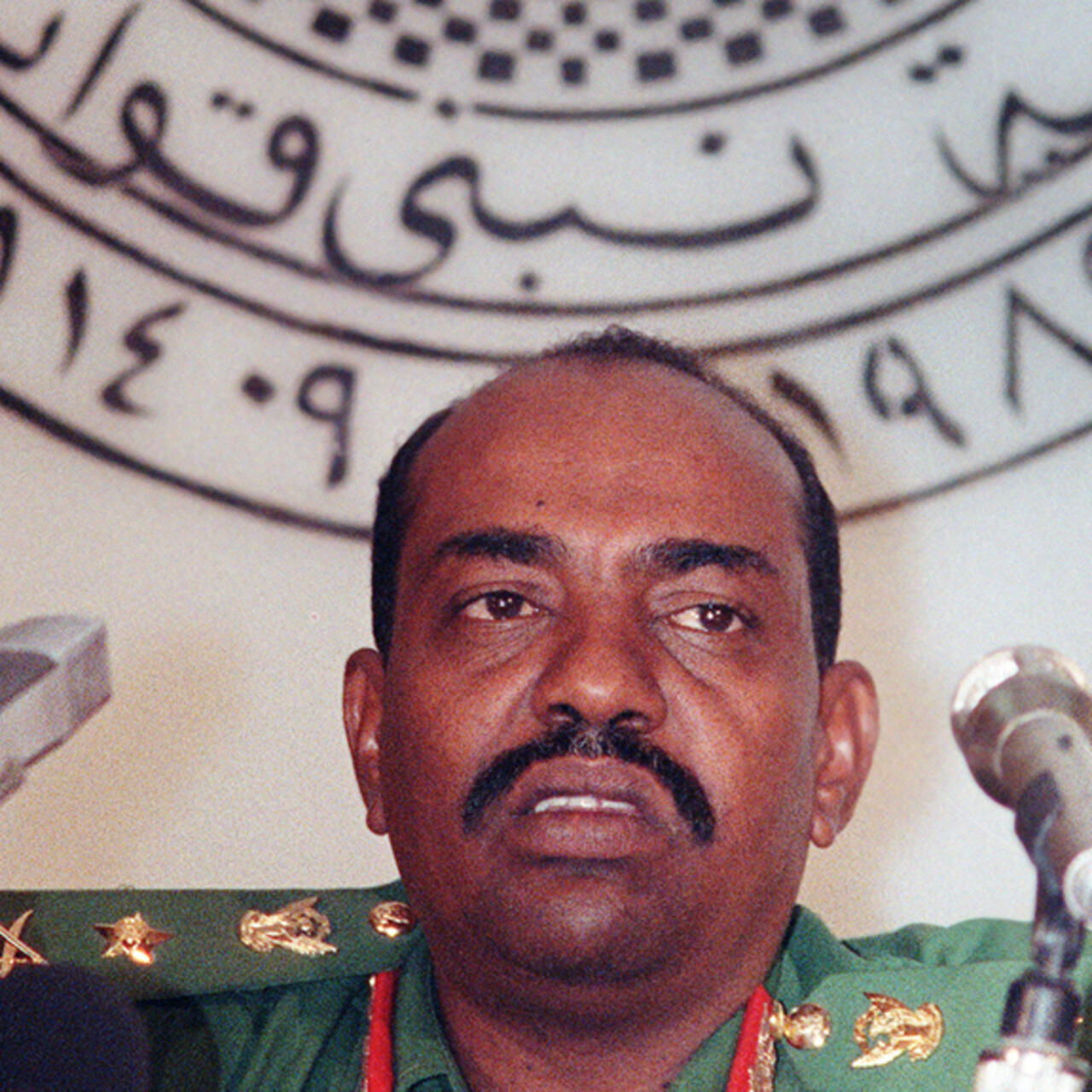
Omar al-Bashir in 1989

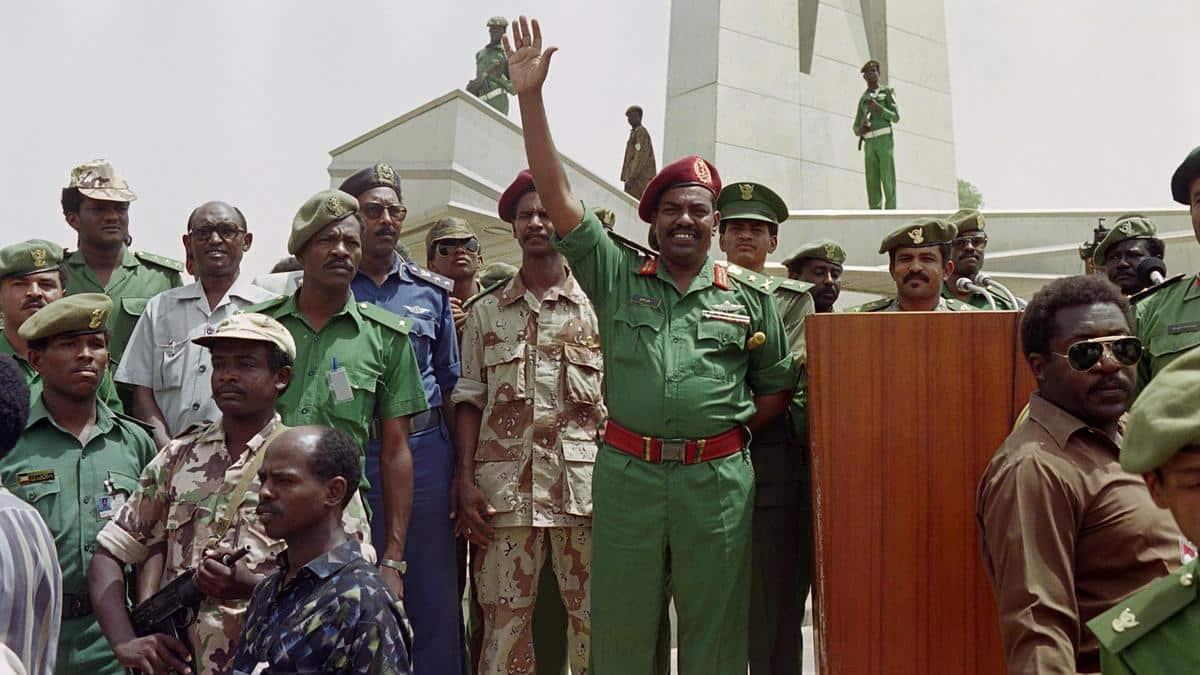
Omar al-Bashir (centre) and Abdel Rahim Mohammed Hussein (blue fatigue) in front of the Republican Palace after the coup

When he returned to Sudan as a colonel in the Sudanese Army, al-Bashir led a group of army officers in ousting the unstable coalition government of Prime Minister Sadiq al-Mahdi in a bloodless military coup on 30 June 1989. Under al-Bashir's leadership, the new military government suspended political parties and introduced an Islamic legal code on the national level. He then became chairman of the Revolutionary Command Council for National Salvation (a newly established body with legislative and executive powers for what was described as a transitional period), and assumed the posts of chief of state, prime minister, chief of the armed forces, and Minister of Defence. Subsequent to al-Bashir's promotion to the chairman of the Revolutionary Command Council for National Salvation, he allied himself with Hassan al-Turabi, the leader of the National Islamic Front, who, along with al-Bashir, began institutionalizing Sharia law in the northern part of Sudan. Further on, al-Bashir issued purges and executions of people whom he alleged to be coup leaders in the upper ranks of the army, the banning of associations, political parties, and independent newspapers, as well as the imprisonment of leading political figures and journalists.

On 16 October 1993, al-Bashir increased his power when he appointed himself president of the country, after which he disbanded the Revolutionary Command Council for National Salvation and all other rival political parties. The executive and legislative powers of the council were later given to al-Bashir completely. In the early 1990s, al-Bashir's administration gave the green light to float a new currency called Sudanese dinar to replace the battered old Sudanese pound that had lost 90 percent of its worth during the turbulent 1980s; the currency was later changed back to pounds, but at a much higher rate. He was later elected president (with a five-year term) in the 1996 national election, where he was the only candidate legally allowed to run for election.

=== Elections ===
Omar al-Bashir was elected president (with a five-year term) in the 1996 national election and Hassan al-Turabi was elected to a seat in the National Assembly where he served as speaker of the National Assembly "during the 1990s". In 1998, al-Bashir and the Presidential Committee put into effect a new constitution, allowing limited political associations in opposition to al-Bashir's National Congress Party and his supporters to be formed. On 12 December 1999, al-Bashir sent troops and tanks against parliament and ousted Hassan al-Turabi, the speaker of parliament, in a palace coup.

He was reelected by popular vote for a five-year term during the 2000 Sudanese general election.

From 2005 to 2010, a transitional government was set up under a 2005 peace accord that ended the 21-year long Second Sudanese Civil War and saw the formation of a power-sharing agreement between Salva Kiir's Sudan People's Liberation Movement (SPLM) and al Bashir's National Congress Party (NCP).

Al-Bashir was reelected president in the 2010 Sudanese general election with 68% of the popular vote; while Salva Kiir was elected President of Southern Sudan. These elections were agreed on earlier in the 2005 peace accord. The election was marked by corruption, intimidation, and inequality. European observers, from the European Union and the Carter Center, criticised the polls as "not meeting international standards". Candidates opposed to the SPLM said they were often detained or stopped from campaigning. Sudan Democracy First, an umbrella organisation in the north, put forward what it called strong evidence of rigging by al-Bashir's NCP. The Sudanese Network for Democracy and Elections (Sunde) spoke of harassment and intimidation in the south, by the security forces of the SPLM.

Al-Bashir had achieved significant economic growth within Sudan. This was pushed further by the drilling and extraction of oil- However, economic growth was not shared by all. Headline inflation in 2012 approached the threshold of chronic inflation (period average 36%), about 11% up from the budget projection of 2012 reflecting the combined effects of inflationary financing, the depreciation of the exchange rate, and the continued removal of subsidies, as well as high food and energy prices. This economic downturn prompted cost of living riots that erupted into Arab Spring-style anti-government demonstrations, raising discontent within the Sudanese Workers' Trade Union Federation (SWTUF). They threatened to hold nationwide strikes in support of higher wages. The continued deterioration in the value of the Sudanese pound (SDG) posed grave downside risks to already soaring inflation. This, coupled with the economic slowdown, presented serious challenges to the implementation of the approved Interim Poverty Reduction Strategy Paper (I-PRSP).

=== Tensions with Hassan al-Turabi ===
In the mid-1990s, a feud between al-Bashir and al-Turabi began, mostly due to al-Turabi's links to Islamic fundamentalist groups, as well as allowing them to operate out of Sudan, even personally inviting Osama bin Laden to the country. The United States had listed Sudan as a state sponsor of terrorism since 1993, mostly due to al-Bashir and Hassan al-Turabi taking complete power in the early 1990s. U.S. firms have been barred from doing business in Sudan since 1997. In 1998, the Al-Shifa pharmaceutical factory in Khartoum was destroyed by a U.S. cruise missile strike because of its alleged production of chemical weapons and links to al-Qaeda. However the U.S. State Department Bureau of Intelligence and Research wrote a report in 1999 questioning the attack on the factory, suggesting that the connection to bin Laden was not accurate; James Risen reported in The New York Times: "Now, the analysts renewed their doubts and told Assistant Secretary of State Phyllis Oakley that the C.I.A.'s evidence on which the attack was based was inadequate. Ms. Oakley asked them to double-check; perhaps there was some intelligence they had not yet seen. The answer came back quickly: There was no additional evidence. Ms. Oakley called a meeting of key aides and a consensus emerged: Contrary to what the Administration was saying, the case tying Al Shifa to Mr. bin Laden or to chemical weapons was weak."

After being re-elected president of Sudan with a five-year-term in the 1996 election with 75.7% of the popular vote, al-Bashir issued the registration of legalized political parties in 1999 after being influenced by al-Turabi. Rival parties such as the Liberal Democrats of Sudan and the Alliance of the Peoples' Working Forces, headed by former Sudanese President Gaafar Nimeiry, were established and were allowed to run for election against al-Bashir's National Congress Party, however, they failed to achieve significant support, and al-Bashir was re-elected president, receiving 86.5% of the popular vote in the 2000 presidential election. At the legislative elections that same year, al-Bashir's National Congress Party won 355 out of 360 seats, with al-Turabi as its chairman. However, after al-Turabi introduced a bill to reduce the president's powers, prompting al-Bashir to dissolve parliament and declare a state of emergency, tensions began to rise between al-Bashir and al-Turabi. Reportedly, al-Turabi was suspended as chairman of National Congress Party, after he urged a boycott of the president's re-election campaign. Then, a splinter-faction led by al-Turabi, the Popular National Congress Party (PNC) signed an agreement with Sudan People's Liberation Army, which led al-Bashir to believe that they were plotting to overthrow him and the government.

Further on, al-Turabi's influence and that of his party's "'internationalist' and ideological wing" waned "in favor of the 'nationalist' or more pragmatic leaders who focus on trying to recover from Sudan's disastrous international isolation and economic damage that resulted from ideological adventurism". At the same time, Sudan worked to appease the United States and other international critics by expelling members of Egyptian Islamic Jihad and encouraging bin Laden to leave.

On al-Bashir's orders, al-Turabi was imprisoned based on allegations of conspiracy in 2000 before being released in October 2003. Al-Turabi was again imprisoned in March 2004 and released in July 2005, at the height of the peace agreement in the civil war.

=== Engagement with the U.S. and European countries ===
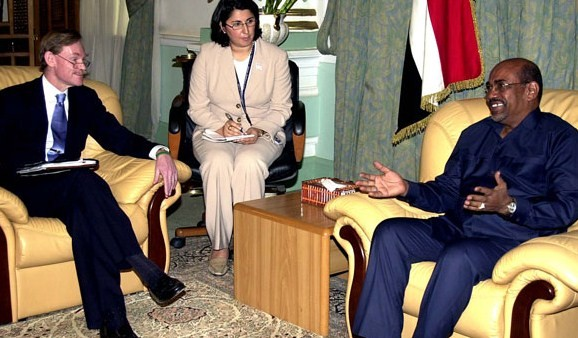
Al-Bashir and U.S. Deputy Secretary of State Robert Zoellick, 2005

From the early 1990s, after al-Bashir assumed power, Sudan backed Iraq in its invasion of Kuwait and was accused of harbouring and providing sanctuary and assistance to Islamic terrorist groups. Carlos the Jackal, Osama bin Laden, Abu Nidal and others labeled "terrorist leaders" by the United States and its allies resided in Khartoum. Sudan's role in the Popular Arab and Islamic Congress (PAIC), spearheaded by Hassan al-Turabi, represented a matter of great concern to the security of American officials and dependents in Khartoum, resulting in several reductions and evacuations of American personnel from Khartoum in the early to mid 1990s.

Sudan's Islamist links with international terrorist organizations represented a special matter of concern for the American government, leading to Sudan's 1993 designation as a state sponsor of terrorism and a suspension of U.S. Embassy operations in Khartoum in 1996. In late 1994, in an initial effort to reverse his nation's growing image throughout the world as a country harboring terrorists, Bashir secretly cooperated with French special forces to orchestrate the capture and arrest on Sudanese soil of Carlos the Jackal.

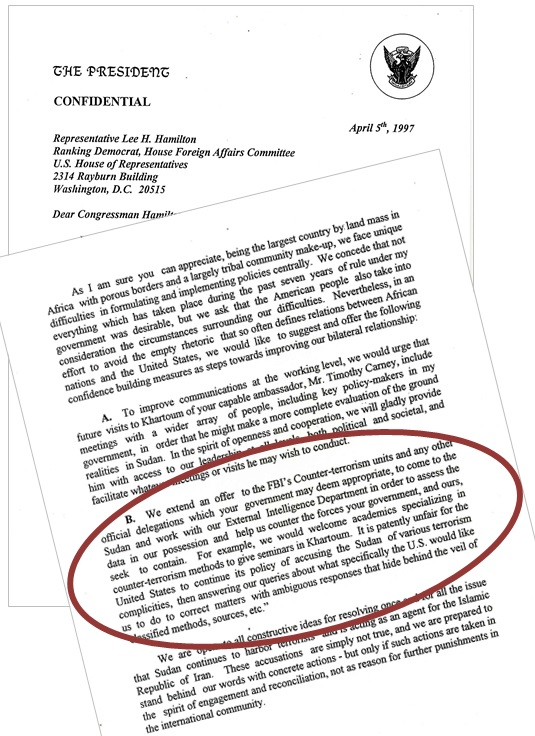
Sudan's offer of and request for counter-terrorism assistance, April 1997

In early 1996, al-Bashir authorised his Defence Minister at the time, El Fatih Erwa, to make a series of secret trips to the United States to hold talks with American officials, including officers of the CIA and United States Department of State about American sanctions policy against Sudan and what measures might be taken by the Bashir regime to remove the sanctions. Erwa was presented with a series of demands from the United States, including demands for information about Osama bin Laden and other radical Islamic groups. The US demand list also encouraged Bashir's regime to move away from activities, such as hosting the Popular Arab and Islamic Congress, that impinged on Sudanese efforts to reconcile with the West. Sudan's Mukhabarat (central intelligence agency) spent half a decade amassing intelligence data on bin Laden and a wide array of Islamists through their periodic annual visits for the PAIC conferences. In May 1996, after the series of Erwa secret meetings on US soil, the Clinton Administration demanded that Sudan expel Bin Laden. Bashir complied.

Controversy erupted about whether Sudan had offered to extradite bin Laden in return for rescinding American sanctions that were interfering with Sudan's plans to develop oil fields in southern areas of the country. American officials insisted the secret meetings were agreed only to pressure Sudan into compliance on a range of anti-terrorism issues. The Sudanese insisted that an offer to extradite bin Laden had been made in a secret one-on-one meeting at a Fairfax hotel between Erwa and the then CIA Africa Bureau chief on condition that Washington end sanctions against Bashir's regime. Ambassador Timothy M. Carney attended one of the Fairfax hotel meetings. In a joint opinion piece in the Washington Post Outlook Section in 2003, Carney and Ijaz argued that in fact the Sudanese had offered to extradite bin Laden to a third country in exchange for sanctions relief.

In August 1996, American hedge-fund manager Mansoor Ijaz travelled to Sudan and met with senior officials including al-Turabi and al-Bashir. Ijaz asked Sudanese officials to share intelligence data with US officials on bin Laden and other Islamists who had traveled to and from Sudan during the previous five years. Ijaz conveyed his findings to US officials upon his return, including Sandy Berger, then Clinton's deputy national security adviser, and argued for the US to constructively engage the Sudanese and other Islamic countries. In April 1997, Ijaz persuaded al-Bashir to make an unconditional offer of counterterrorism assistance in the form of a signed presidential letter that Ijaz delivered to Congressman Lee H. Hamilton by hand.

In late September 1997, months after the Sudanese overture (made by al-Bashir in the letter to Hamilton), the U.S. State Department, under Secretary of State Madeleine Albright's directive, first announced it would return American diplomats to Khartoum to pursue counterterrorism data in the Mukhabarat's possession. Within days, the U.S. reversed that decision and imposed harsher and more comprehensive economic, trade, and financial sanctions against Sudan, which went into effect in October 1997. In August 1998, in the wake of the East Africa embassy bombings, the U.S. launched cruise missile strikes against Khartoum. U.S. Ambassador to Sudan, Tim Carney, departed post in February 1996 and no new ambassador was designated until December 2019, when U.S. president Donald Trump's administration reached an agreement with the new Sudanese government to exchange ambassadors.

Al-Bashir announced in August 2015 that he would travel to New York in September to speak at the United Nations. It was unclear to date if al-Bashir would have been allowed to travel, due to previous sanctions.

=== South Sudan ===
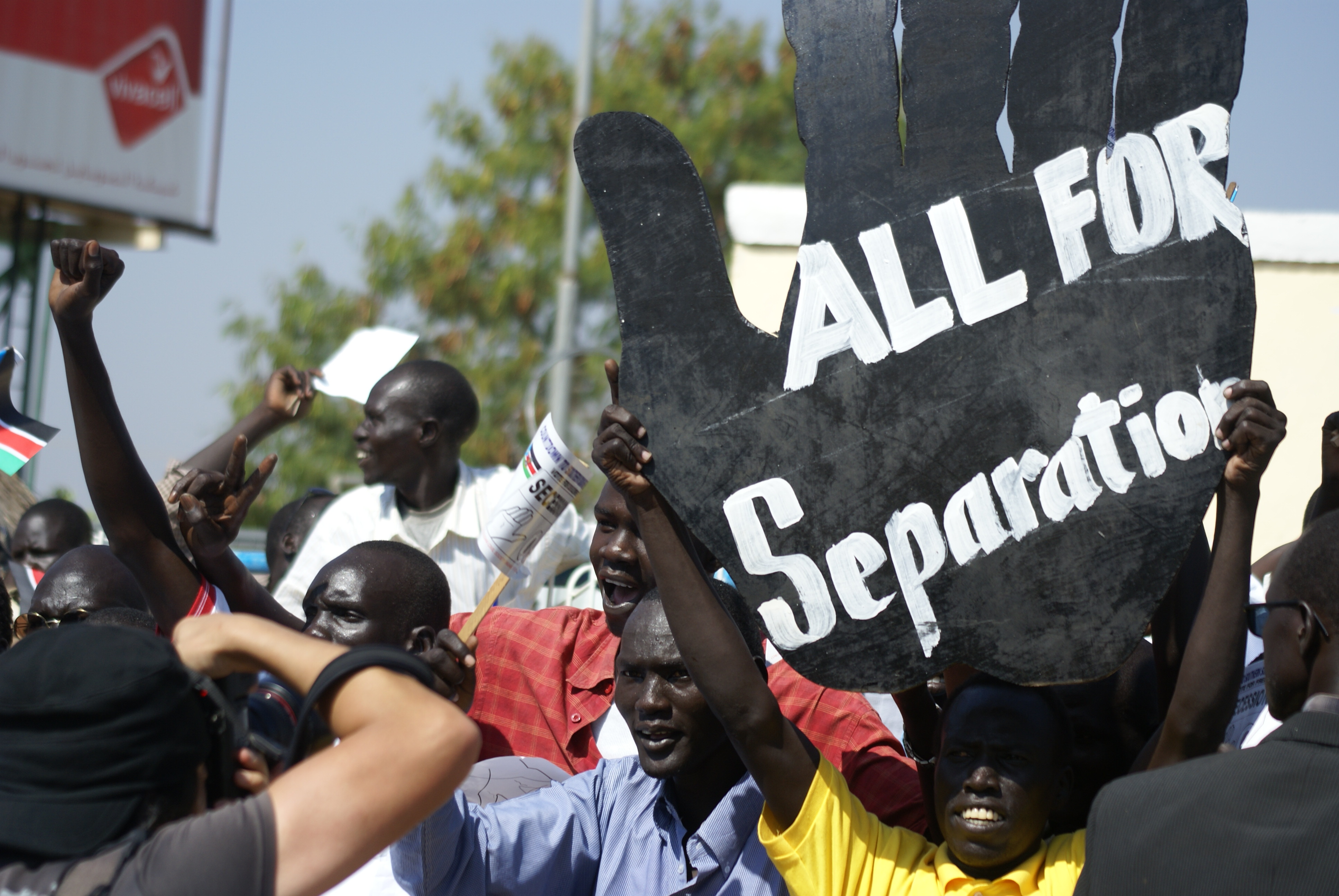
2011 South Sudanese independence referendum

When al-Bashir took power the Second Sudanese Civil War had been ongoing for nine years. The war soon effectively developed into a conflict between the Sudan People's Liberation Army and al-Bashir's government. The war resulted in millions of southerners being displaced, starved, and deprived of education and health care, with almost two million casualties. Because of these actions, various international sanctions were placed on Sudan. International pressure intensified in 2001, however, and leaders from the United Nations called for al-Bashir to make efforts to end the conflict and allow humanitarian and international workers to deliver relief to the southern regions of Sudan. Much progress was made throughout 2003. The peace was consolidated with the official signing by both sides of the Nairobi Comprehensive Peace Agreement 9 January 2005, granting Southern Sudan autonomy for six years, to be followed by a referendum on independence. It created a co-vice president position and allowed the north and south to split oil deposits equally, but also left both the north's and south's armies in place. John Garang, the south's peace agreement appointed co-vice president, died in a helicopter crash on 1 August 2005, three weeks after being sworn in. This resulted in riots, but the peace was eventually re-established and allowed the southerners to vote in a referendum of independence at the end of the six-year period. On 9 July 2011, following a referendum, the region of Southern Sudan split off from Sudan to form South Sudan.

=== War in Darfur ===
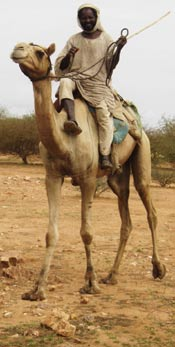
Series of droughts in Darfur led to disputes over land between non-Arab sedentary farmers and Arab Janjaweed nomads (see illustrative photo).

Since 1968, Sudanese politicians had attempted to create separate factions of "Africans" and "Arabs" in the western area of Darfur, a difficult task as the population were substantially intermarried and could not be distinguished by skin tone. This internal political instability was aggravated by cross-border conflicts with Chad and Libya and the 1984–1985 Darfur famine. In 2003, the Justice and Equality Movement and the Sudanese Liberation Army –accusing the government of neglecting Darfur and oppressing non-Arabs in favor of Arabs – began an armed insurgency.

Estimates vary of the number of deaths resulting from attacks on the non-Arab/Arabized population by the Janjaweed militia: the Sudanese government claim that up to 10,000 have been killed in this conflict; the United Nations reported that about 300,000 had died as of 2010, and other reports place the figures at between 200,000 and 400,000. During an interview with David Frost for the Al Jazeera English programme Frost Over The World in June 2008, al-Bashir insisted that no more than 10,000 had died in Darfur.

The Sudanese government had been accused of suppressing information by jailing and killing witnesses since 2004, and tampering with evidence, such as covering up mass graves. The Sudanese government has also arrested and harassed journalists, thus limiting the extent of press coverage of the situation in Darfur. While the United States government has described the conflict as genocide, the UN has not recognized the conflict as such. (see List of declarations of genocide in Darfur)

The United States Government stated in September 2004 "that genocide has been committed in Darfur and that the Government of Sudan and the Janjaweed bear responsibility and that genocide may still be occurring". On 29 June 2004, U.S. Secretary of State Colin Powell met with al-Bashir in Sudan and urged him to make peace with the rebels, end the crisis, and lift restrictions on the delivery of humanitarian aid to Darfur. Kofi Annan met with al-Bashir three days later and demanded that he disarm the Janjaweed.

After fighting stopped in July and August, on 31 August 2006, the United Nations Security Council approved Resolution 1706 which called for a new UN peacekeeping force consisting of 17,300 military personnel and 3,300 civilians and named the United Nations–African Union Mission in Darfur (UNAMID). It was intended to have supplanted or supplemented a 7,000-troop African Union Mission in Sudan peacekeeping force. Sudan strongly objected to the resolution and said that it would see the UN forces in the region as "foreign invaders". A day after rejecting the UN forces into Sudan, the Sudanese military launched a major offensive in the region. In March 2007, the United Nations Human Rights Council accused Sudan's government of taking part in "gross violations" in Darfur and urged the international community to take urgent action to protect people in Darfur. A high-level technical consultation was held in Addis Ababa, Ethiopia, on 11–12 June 2007, pursuant to the 4 June 2007 letters of the secretary-general and the chairperson of the African Union Commission, which were addressed to al-Bashir. The technical consultations were attended by delegations from the Government of Sudan, the African Union, and the United Nations.

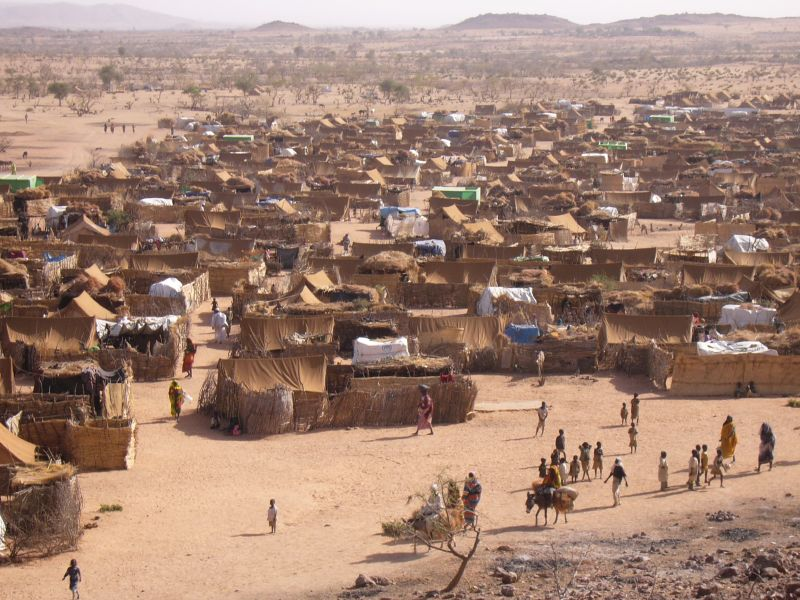
Darfur refugee camp in Chad, 2005

In 2009, General Martin Luther Agwai, head of the UNAMID, said the war was over in the region, although low-level disputes remained. "Banditry, localised issues, people trying to resolve issues over water and land at a local level. But real war as such, I think we are over that," he said. This perspective is contradicted by reports which indicate that violence continues in Darfur while peace efforts have been stalled repeatedly. Violence between Sudan's military and rebel fighters has beset South Kordofan and Blue Nile states since disputed state elections in May 2011, an ongoing humanitarian crisis that has prompted international condemnation and U.S. congressional hearings. In 2012, tensions between Sudan and South Sudan reached a boiling point when the Sudanese military bombed territory in South Sudan, leading to hostilities over the disputed Heglig (or Panthou) oil fields located along the Sudan-South Sudan border. Omar al-Bashir sought the assistance of numerous non-western countries after the West, led by America, imposed sanctions against him, he said: "From the first day, our policy was clear: To look eastward, toward China, Malaysia, India, Pakistan, Indonesia, and even Korea and Japan, even if the Western influence upon some [of these] countries is strong. We believe that the Chinese expansion was natural because it filled the space left by Western governments, the United States, and international funding agencies. The success of the Sudanese experiment in dealing with China without political conditions or pressures encouraged other African countries to look toward China."

Chadian President Idriss Déby visited Khartoum in 2010 and Chad kicked out the Darfuri rebels it had previously supported. Both Sudanese and Chadian sides together established a joint military border patrol.

On 26 October 2011, al-Bashir announced that he had supported the rebels that had ousted Muammar Gaddafi. It was a reciprocal move for Gaddafi supporting the rebels in Darfur, including the Justice and Equality Movement. "Our God, high and exalted, from above the seven skies, gave us the opportunity to reciprocate the visit," he said. "The forces which entered Tripoli, part of their arms and capabilities, were 100% Sudanese," he told the crowd. His speech was well received by a large crowd in the eastern Sudanese town of Kassala.

Al-Bashir in his speech said that his government's priority was to end the armed rebellion and tribal conflicts in order to save blood and direct the energies of young people towards building Sudan instead of "killing and destruction". He called upon youth of the rebel groups to lay down arms and join efforts to build the country. Al Bashir sees himself as a man wronged and misunderstood. He takes full responsibility for the conflict in Darfur, he says, but says that his government did not start the fighting and has done everything in its power to end it.

Al Bashir had signed two peace agreements for Darfur:

- The 2006 Darfur Peace Agreement, also known as the "Abuja Agreement", was signed on 5 May 2006 by the government of Sudan along with a faction of the SLA led by Minni Minnawi. However, the agreement was rejected by two other, smaller groups, the Justice and Equality Movement (JEM) and a rival faction of the SLA led by Abdul Wahid al Nur.
- The 2011 Darfur Peace Agreement, also known as the "Doha Agreement", was signed in July 2011 between the government of Sudan and the Liberation and Justice Movement. This agreement established a compensation fund for victims of the Darfur conflict, allowed the president of Sudan to appoint a vice-president from Darfur, and established a new Darfur Regional Authority to oversee the region until a referendum can determine its permanent status within the Republic of Sudan.

The agreement also provided for power sharing at the national level: movements that sign the agreement will be entitled to nominate two ministers and two four ministers of state at the federal level and will be able to nominate 20 members to the national legislature. The movements will be entitled to nominate two state governors in the Darfur region.

=== Indictment by the ICC ===
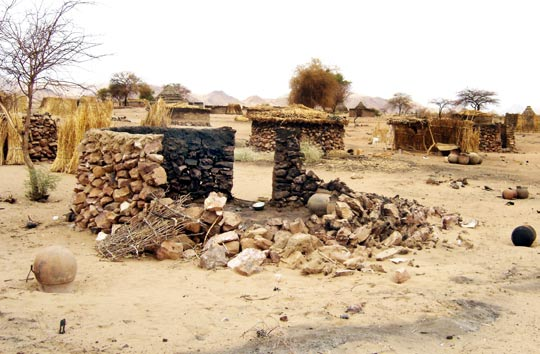
Al-Bashir is accused of directing attacks against civilians in Darfur.

On 14 July 2008, the Chief Prosecutor of the International Criminal Court (ICC), Luis Moreno Ocampo, alleged that al-Bashir bore individual criminal responsibility for genocide, crimes against humanity, and war crimes that had been committed in Darfur since 2003. The prosecutor accused al-Bashir of having "masterminded and implemented" a plan to destroy the three main ethnic groups—Fur, Masalit, and Zaghawa—with a campaign of murder, rape, and deportation. The arrest warrant is supported by NATO, the Genocide Intervention Network, and Amnesty International.

An arrest warrant for al-Bashir was issued on 4 March 2009 by a pre-trial chamber composed of judges Akua Kuenyehia of Ghana, Anita Ušacka of Latvia, and Sylvia Steiner of Brazil indicting him on five counts of crimes against humanity (murder, extermination, forcible transfer, torture and rape) and two counts of war crimes (pillaging and intentionally directing attacks against civilians). The court ruled that there was insufficient evidence to prosecute him for genocide. However, Ušacka wrote a dissenting opinion arguing that there were "reasonable grounds to believe that Omar Al Bashir has committed the crime of genocide".

Sudan is not a state party to the Rome Statute establishing the ICC, and thus claims that it does not have to execute the warrant. However, United Nations Security Council Resolution 1593 (2005) referred Sudan to the ICC, which gives the court jurisdiction over international crimes committed in Sudan and obligates Government of Sudan to cooperate with the ICC, and therefore the court, Amnesty International and others insist that Sudan must comply with the arrest warrant of the International Criminal Court. Amnesty International stated that al-Bashir must turn himself in to face the charges, and that the Sudanese authorities must detain him and turn him over to the ICC if he refuses.

Al-Bashir was the first sitting head of state ever indicted by the ICC. However, the Arab League and the African Union condemned the warrant. Following the indictment Al-Bashir visited China, Djibouti, Egypt, Ethiopia, India, Libya, Nigeria, Qatar, Saudi Arabia, the United Arab Emirates, and several other countries, all of which refused to have him arrested. ICC member state Chad also refused to arrest al-Bashir during a state visit in July 2010. He was also invited to attend conferences in Denmark and Turkey. On 28 November 2011, following a visit to Kenya, Kenya's High Court Judge Nicholas Ombija ordered the Minister of Internal Security to arrest al-Bashir, "should he set foot in Kenya in the future". In June 2015, while in South Africa for an African Union meeting, al-Bashir was prohibited from leaving that country while a court decided whether he should be handed over to the ICC for war crimes. He, nevertheless, was allowed to leave South Africa soon afterward. Luis Moreno Ocampo and Amnesty International claimed that al-Bashir's plane could be intercepted in international airspace. Sudan announced that the presidential plane would always be escorted by fighter jets of the Sudanese Air Force to prevent his arrest. In March 2009, just before al-Bashir's visit to Qatar, the Sudanese government was reportedly considering sending fighter jets to accompany his plane to Qatar, possibly in response to France expressing support for an operation to intercept his plane in international airspace, as France has military bases in Djibouti and the United Arab Emirates.

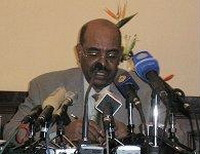
Al-Bashir in Beijing, China, 3 November 2006

The charges against al-Bashir have been criticized and ignored in Sudan and abroad, particularly in Africa and the Muslim world. Former president of the African Union Muammar al-Gaddafi characterized the indictment as a form of terrorism. He also believed that the warrant is an attempt "by (the west) to recolonize their former colonies". Egypt said, it was "greatly disturbed" by the ICC decision and called for an emergency meeting of the UN security council to defer the arrest warrant. The Arab League Secretary-General Amr Moussa expressed that the organization emphasizes its solidarity with Sudan and condemned the warrant for "undermining the unity and stability of Sudan". The Organisation of Islamic Cooperation denounced the warrant as unwarranted and totally unacceptable. It argued that the warrant demonstrated "selectivity and double standard applied in relation to issues of war crimes".

Al-Bashir has rejected the charges, saying "Whoever has visited Darfur, met officials and discovered their ethnicities and tribes ... will know that all of these things are lies." He described the charges as "not worth the ink they are written in". The warrant was to be delivered to the Sudanese government, which stated that they would not carry it out.

The Sudanese government retaliated against the warrant by expelling a number of international aid agencies, including Oxfam and Mercy Corps. President Bashir described the aid agencies as thieves who take "99 percent of the budget for humanitarian work themselves, giving the people of Darfur 1 percent" and as spies in the work of foreign regimes. Bashir promised that national agencies will provide aid to Darfur.

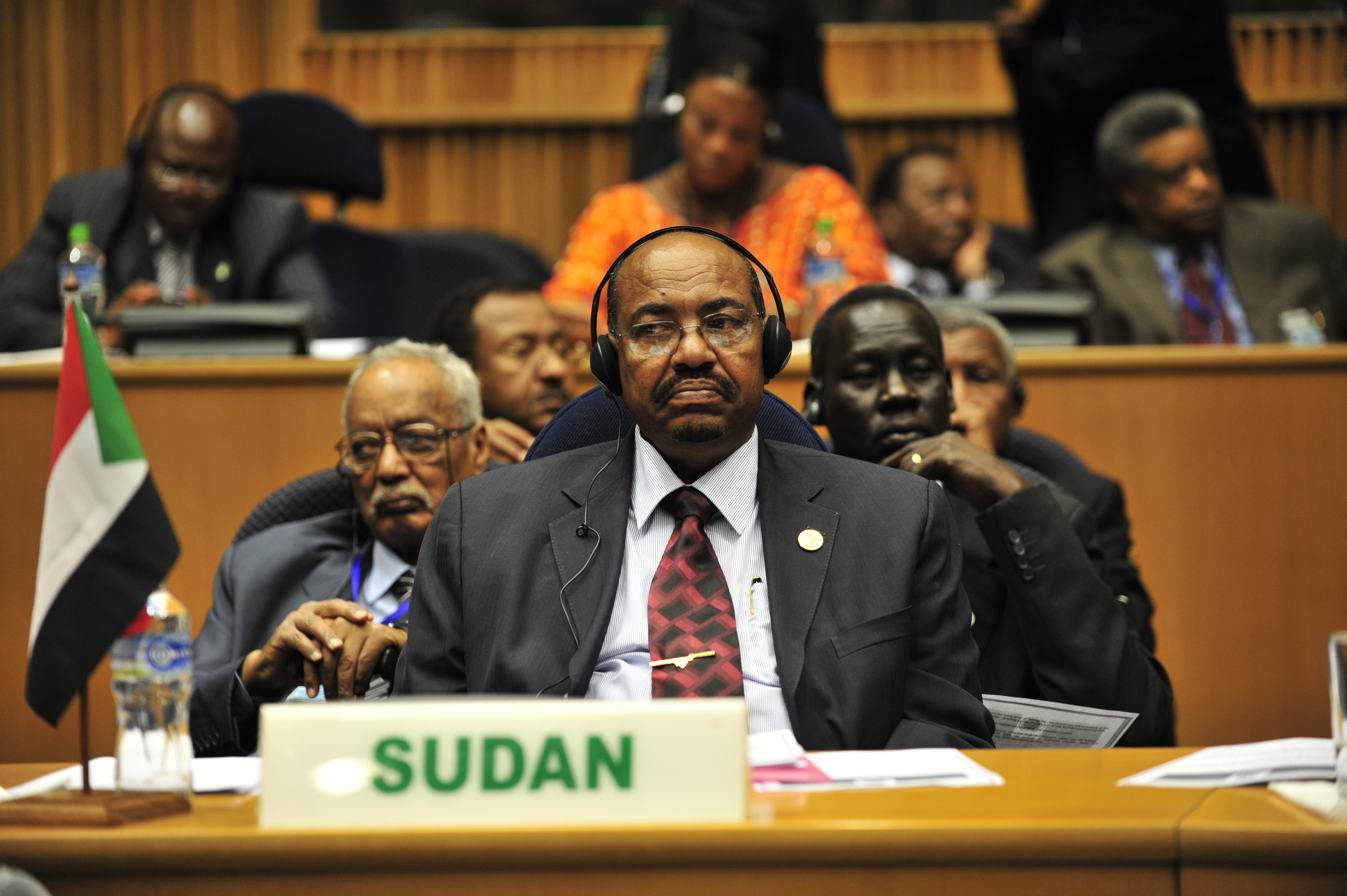
Al-Bashir in Addis Ababa, Ethiopia, 31 January 2009

Al-Bashir was one of the candidates in the 2010 Sudanese presidential election, the first democratic election with multiple political parties participating since the 1986 election. It had been suggested that by holding and winning a legitimate presidential elections in 2010, al-Bashir had hoped to evade the ICC's warrant for his arrest. On 26 April, he was officially declared the winner after Sudan's election commission announced he had received 68% of the votes cast in the election. However, The New York Times noted the voting was "marred by boycotts and reports of intimidation and widespread fraud".

In August 2013, Bashir's plane was blocked from entering Saudi Arabian airspace when Bashir was attempting to attend the inauguration of Iranian President Hassan Rouhani, whose country is the main supplier of weapons to Sudan.

A second arrest warrant for al-Bashir was issued on 12 July 2010. The ICC issued an additional warrant adding 3 counts of genocide for the ethnic cleansing of the Fur, Masalit, and Zaghawa tribes. The new warrant included the court's conclusion that there were reasonable grounds to suspect that al-Bashir acted with specific intent to destroy in part the Fur, Masalit and Zaghawa ethnic groups in the Darfur region. The charges against al-Bashir, in three separate counts, include "genocide by killing", "genocide by causing serious bodily or mental harm" and "genocide by deliberately inflicting on each target group conditions of life calculated to bring about the group's physical destruction". The new warrant acted as a supplement to the first, whereby the charges initially brought against al-Bashir all remained in place, but now included the crime of genocide which was initially ruled out, pending appeal.

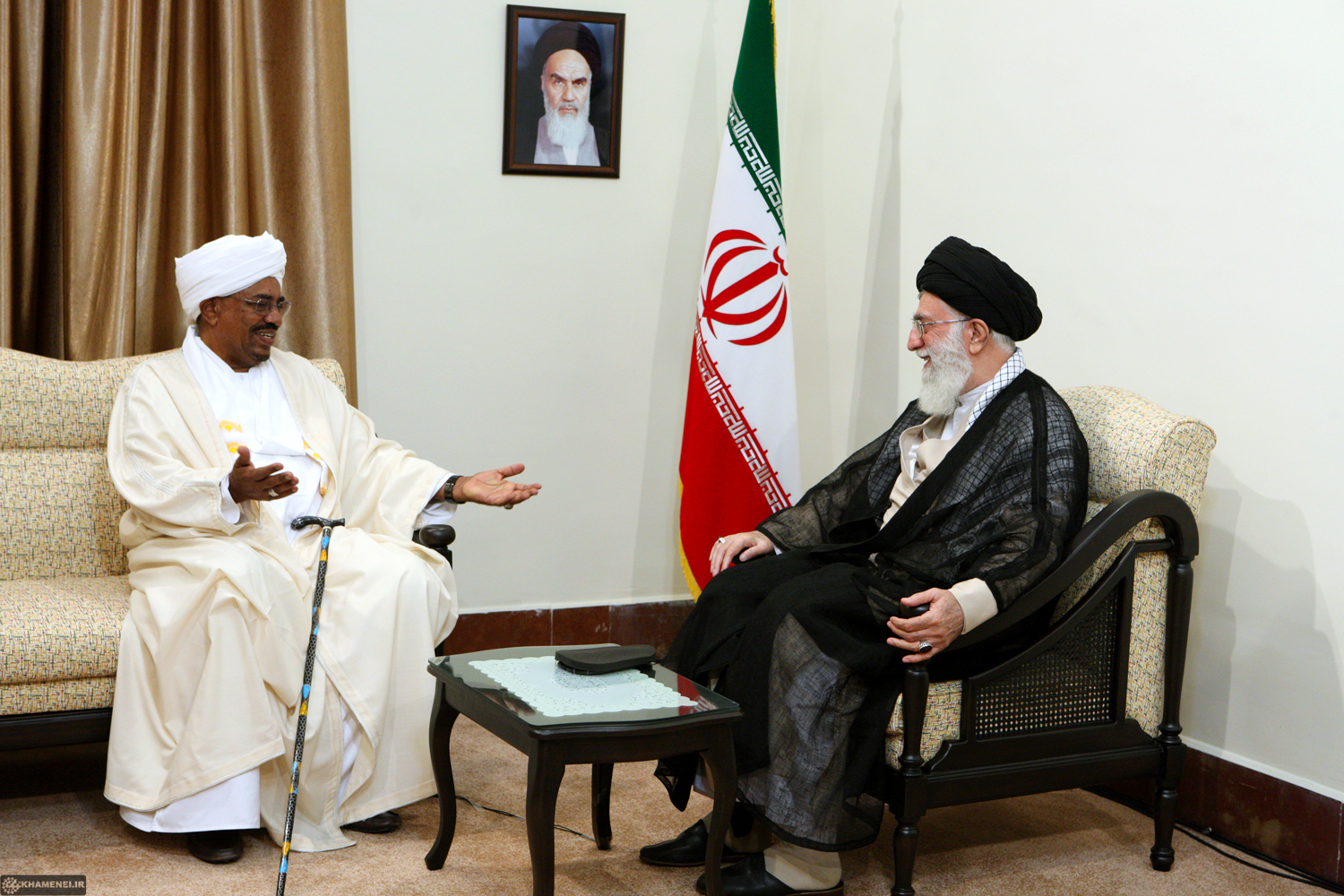
Al-Bashir with Iran's Supreme Leader Ali Khamenei, Tehran, 31 August 2012

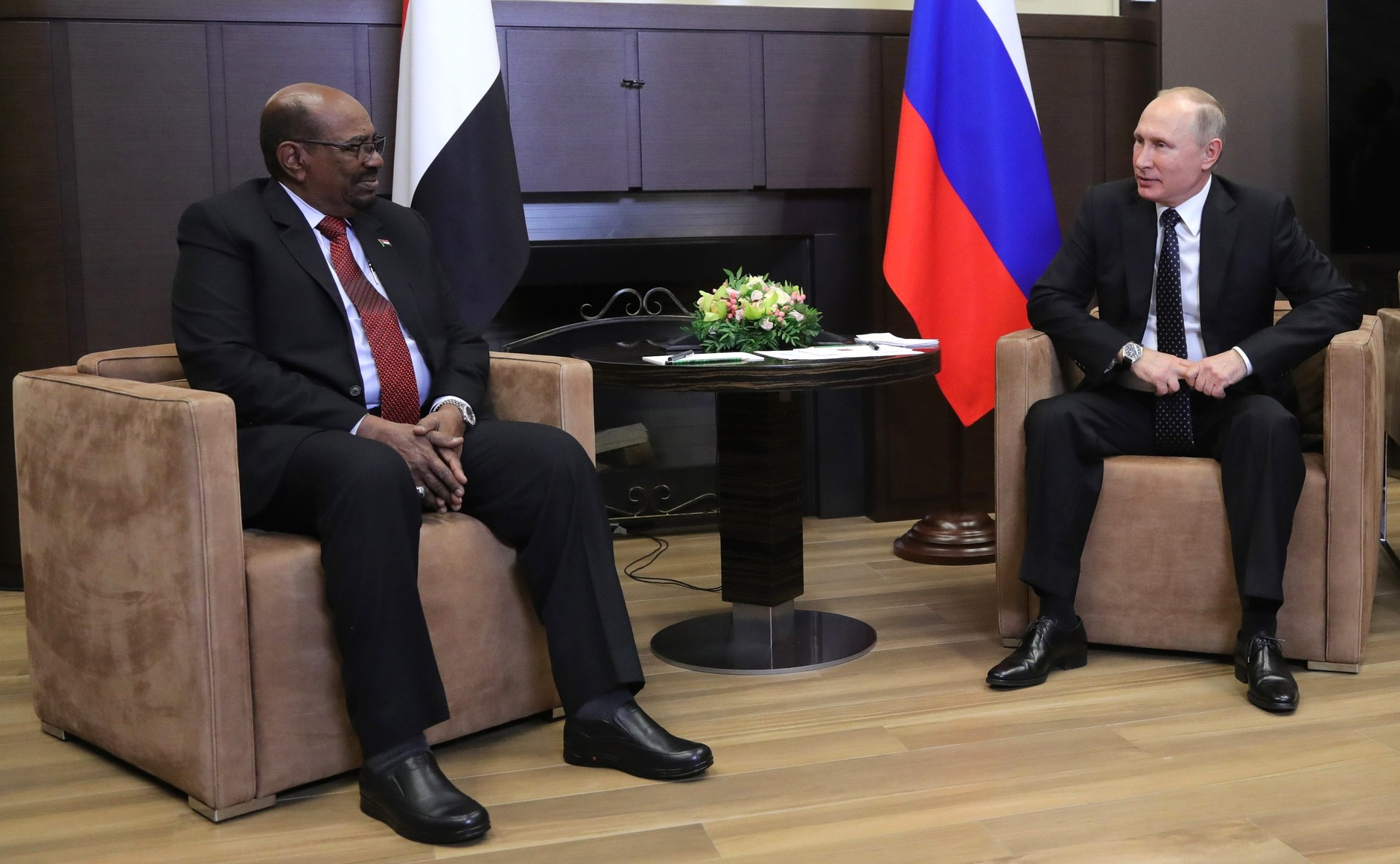
Al-Bashir and Russian President Vladimir Putin during a meeting in Sochi on 27 November 2017

Al-Bashir said that Sudan is not a party to the ICC treaty and could not be expected to abide by its provisions just like the United States, China and Russia. He said "It is a political issue and double standards, because there are obvious crimes like Palestine, Iraq and Afghanistan, but [they] did not find their way to the International Criminal Court". He added "The same decision in which [the] Darfur case [was] being transferred to the court stated that the American soldiers [in Iraq and Afghanistan] would not be questioned by the court, so it is not about justice, it is a political issue." Al Bashir accused Luis Moreno Ocampo, the ICC's chief prosecutor since 2003 of repeatedly lying in order to damage his reputation and standing. Al-Bashir said "The behavior of the prosecutor of the court, it was clearly the behavior of a political activist not a legal professional. He is now working on a big campaign to add more lies." He added, "The biggest lie was when he said I have $9bn in one of the British banks, and thank God, the British bank and the [British] finance minister … denied these allegations." He also said: "The clearest cases in the world such as Palestine and Iraq and Afghanistan, clear crimes to the whole humanity – all were not transferred to the court."

Russia and China echoed Bashir's argument that the ICC was being used as a political tool and argued for Al-Bashir's immunity as a head of state and continued supplying Sudan with weapons during the trial. As permanent members of the UNSC, they opposed the ICC's actions against Al-Bashir and worked within the UNSC to block resolutions that would force Al-Bashir to comply with the court's rulings. China had significant economic and strategic interests in Sudan, including oil investments, and maintained strong diplomatic ties with Al-Bashir's government. They hosted him in 2015 despite the arrest warrants against him, and Russia as well in 2017, undermining the legitimacy of the court's ruling.

In October 2013, several members of the African Union expressed anger at the ICC, calling it "racist" for failing to file charges against Western leaders or Western allies while prosecuting only African suspects so far. The African Union demanded that the ICC protect African heads of state from prosecution.

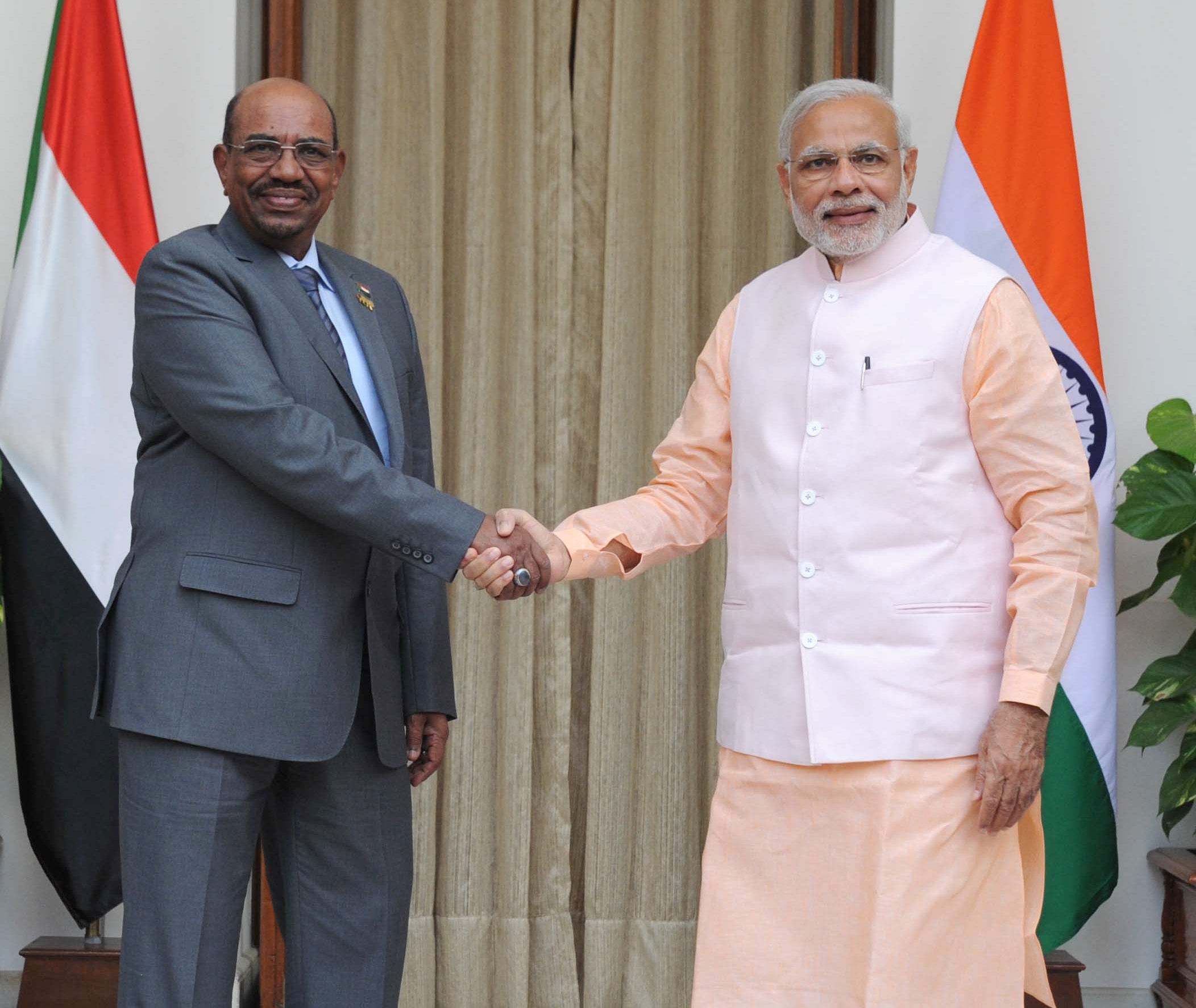
Al-Bashir meeting with Indian Prime Minister Narendra Modi, New Delhi, India, 30 October 2015

=== Military intervention in Yemen ===
In 2015, Sudan participated in the Saudi Arabian-led intervention in Yemen against the Shia Houthis and forces loyal to former president Ali Abdullah Saleh, who was deposed during the 2011–2012 Yemeni revolution. Reuters reported that "The war in Yemen has given Omar Hassan al-Bashir, a skilled political operator who has ruled Sudan for a quarter-century, an opportunity to show wealthy Sunni powers that he can be an asset against Iranian influence – if the price is right."

=== Allegations of corruption ===
During the Second Sudanese Civil War, Al-Bashir allegedly looted Sudan of much of its wealth. According to leaked US diplomatic cables, $9 billion of his siphoned wealth was stored in banks in London. Luis Moreno-Ocampo, the chief prosecutor of the ICC, stated that some of the funds were being held in the partially nationalized Lloyds Banking Group. He also reportedly told US officials it was necessary to go public with the scale of al-Bashir's extortion to turn public opinion against him. One US official stated "Ocampo suggested if Bashir's stash of money were disclosed (he put the figure at $9bn), it would change Sudanese public opinion from him being a 'crusader' to that of a thief." "Ocampo reported Lloyd's bank in London may be holding or knowledgeable of the whereabouts of his money," the report says. "Ocampo suggested exposing Bashir had illegal accounts would be enough to turn the Sudanese against him." A leaked diplomatic cable allegedly reveals that the Sudanese president had embezzled US$9 billion in state funds, but Lloyds Bank "insisted it was not aware of any link with Bashir," while a Sudanese government spokesman called the claim "ludicrous" and attacked the motives of the prosecutor. In an interview with the Guardian, al-Bashir said, referring to ICC Prosecutor Ocampo, "The biggest lie was when he said I have $9 billion in one of the British banks, and thank God, the British bank and the [British] finance minister ... denied these allegations." The arrest warrant actively increased public support for al-Bashir in Sudan.

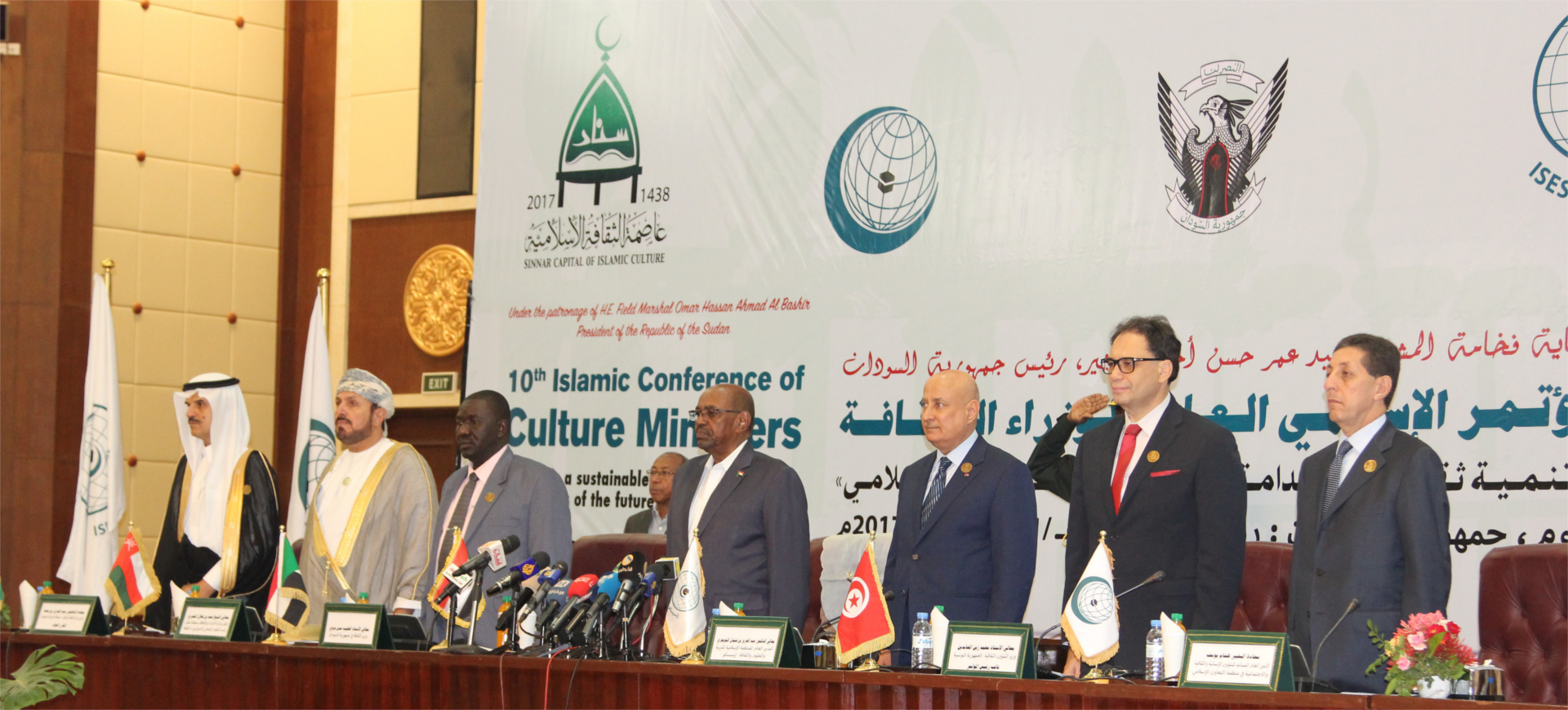
The meeting of the Organisation of Islamic Cooperation (OIC) in Sudan, January 2019

Part of the $8.9 billion fine the BNP Paribas paid for sanctions violations was related to their trade with Sudan. While smaller fines have also been given to other banks, US Justice Department officials said that they found the BNP particularly uncooperative, calling it Sudan's de facto central bank.

=== African space agency ===
In 2012, al-Bashir proposed setting up a continent-wide space agency in Africa. In a statement he said, "I'm calling for the biggest project, an African space agency. Africa must have its space agency... [It] will liberate Africa from technological domination". This followed previous calls in 2010 by the African Union (AU) to conduct a feasibility study that would draw up a "road map for the creation of the African space agency". African astronomy received a massive boost when South Africa was awarded the majority shares of the Square Kilometre Array, the world's biggest radio telescope. It will see dishes erected in nine African countries. But skeptics have questioned whether a continental body in the style of NASA or the European Space Agency would be affordable.

=== Ousting from power ===
On 11 April 2019, al-Bashir was removed from his post by the Sudanese Armed Forces after many months of protests and civil uprisings. He was immediately placed under house arrest pending the formation of a transitional council. At the time of his arrest al-Bashir had been the longest-serving leader of Sudan since the country gained independence in 1956, and was the longest-ruling president of the Arab League. The army also ordered the arrest of all ministers in al-Bashir's cabinet, dissolved the National Legislature and formed a Transitional Military Council, led by his own First Vice President and Defense Minister, Lieutenant General Ahmed Awad Ibn Auf.

== Post-presidency ==
On 17 April 2019, al-Bashir was moved from house arrest to Khartoum's Kobar Prison. On 13 May 2019, prosecutors charged al-Bashir with "inciting and participating in" the killing of protesters. A trial for corruption (after $130 million was found in his home) and money laundering against al-Bashir started during the following months. On 14 December 2019, he was convicted for money laundering and corruption. He was sentenced to two years in prison.

On 21 July 2020, his trial regarding the coup that brought him to power started. About 20 military personnel were indicted for their roles in the coup. On 20 December 2022, al-Bashir said that he bears full responsibility for the events that took place in the country on June 30, 1989. The trial is expected to continue for several more months and if convicted, Bashir could face a death sentence.

=== International Criminal Court ===
On 5 November 2019, the Forces of Freedom and Change alliance (FFC), which held indirect political power during the 39-month Sudanese transition to democracy, stated that it had reached a consensus decision in favor of transferring al-Bashir to the ICC after the completion of his corruption and money laundering trial. In the following days, Sudanese transition period Prime Minister Abdalla Hamdok and Sovereignty Council member Siddiq Tawer stated that al-Bashir would be transferred to the ICC. On 11 February 2020, Sudan's ruling military council agreed to hand over the ousted al-Bashir to the ICC in The Hague to face charges of crimes against humanity in Darfur. In October 2020, ICC Chief Prosecutor Fatou Bensouda and a delegation arrived in Sudan to discuss with the government about Bashir's indictment. In a deal with Darfurian rebels, the government agreed to set up a special war crimes court that would include Bashir.

=== Detention ===
On 26 April 2023, the Sudanese Armed Forces stated that al-Bashir, Bakri Hassan Saleh, Abdel Rahim Mohammed Hussein and two other former officials were taken from Kobar Prison to Alia Military Hospital in Omdurman due to the conflict that erupted earlier that month. Al-Bashir and other officials were later taken to a hospital at Wadi Seidna Air Base, where they remained until their transfer to a facility in Merowe in September 2024. Al-Bashir is reported to be suffering from heart problems. On 1 October 2026, his lawyer alleged that he had been sent to a hospital in Khartoum for treatment, while the Sudan Tribune claimed that Bashir was moved into a "military-run residence" in Khartoum.On 9 October, 2026 Bashir's lawyer stated that Bashir is seeking permission to travel outside Sudan for medical treatmen.

== See also ==
- Politics of Sudan
- History of Sudan

== Notes ==
Political offices
Preceded by Ahmad al-Mirghani	President of Sudan; 1989–2019	Vacant
