= Al Taib Mustafa =

Sudanese journalist, writer, and politician (died 2021)

- الطيب مصطفى
- Born: 1950s Kober, Khartoum North, Sudan
- Died: 16 May 2021; Khartoum, Sudan
- Occupations: writer, journalist

Al Taib Mustafa (Arabic: الطيب مصطفى; born 1950s – 16 May 2021) was a Sudanese journalist, writer, and politician. He was the maternal uncle of former Sudanese president Omar al-Bashir. He was one of the wealthiest media moguls in the country and was a fierce and outspoken critic of South Sudan's independence.

== Early life ==
Mustafa was born within the beginnings of the fifties in the Kober neighborhood in Khartoum North, and finished all of his studies in Khartoum North and then got accepted in the Faculty of Arts at the University of Khartoum, while he also studied telecommunications engineering at the Institute of Transportation at the same time. After graduating, he completed his engineering studies in telecommunications engineering in the Netherlands then went back to work in Khartoum. He then worked in the United Arab Emirates in "Amertel" which was the national communications company before changing it to "Etisalat". He was promoted more than once at the company until he became the reporter for its board of directors and was at the same time a writer in "Emirates News" newspaper.

== Work ==
Al Taib Mustafa went back to Sudan after the Gulf War crisis to work as a media advisor to the late Minister of Finance Abdel Rahim Hamdi who chose him himself. He then worked as the general manager of the Sudan News Agency. He then moved from Sudan News Agency to the television in which it witnessed a great renaissance which transferred it from terrestrial broadcasting to satellite broadcasting, and his mandate witnessed the establishment of the Khartoum International Channel, the expansion of state broadcasting, and the beginning of the programmatic partnership with Sheikh Saleh Al-Kamel, which developed from a distance to become the Blue Nile satellite channel. He then became Minister of State for Communications; He was the first minister of state dedicated to telecommunications, in which he came with the renaissance of the "Sudatel Company" and supervised the initiation of the second operator, which later became Zain. During that time, he was a member of the Arabsat Board of Directors, which benefited from his engineering experience in the field of telecommunications, which was witnessed by its managers. Al-Tayeb resigned after a dispute with the minister over the ministry's policy, to start a career in the press, which he started with the establishment of the "Al-Intibaha" newspaper, to promote the idea of the "Just Peace Forum". He strongly believed that a peaceful separation is the best choice for both North and South. He established a political party in 2006, the Just Peace Forum, after his split from the National Congress Party, President Al-Bashir's party, and then established the "Al-Sihah" newspaper in 2014. Both "Al-Intibaha" and "Al-Sahha" newspapers achieved press success, although the two newspapers were considered opposition newspapers in which they were not spared the consequences of government discontent. Al Taib Mustafa remained an active member of the Islamic movement until his forced exit from the National Congress, which his leadership at the time gave him the choice between leaving the pulpit and adhering to the party's position on the issue of unity with the south, or parting with kindness. He served as a member of the National Assembly of Sudan and was the head of the information committee at the National Assembly.

== Death ==
Al Taib Mustafa died from COVID-19 in Khartoum on May 16, 2021, during the COVID-19 pandemic in Sudan.
