= Saint Michael Catholic High School (Niagara Falls, Ontario) =

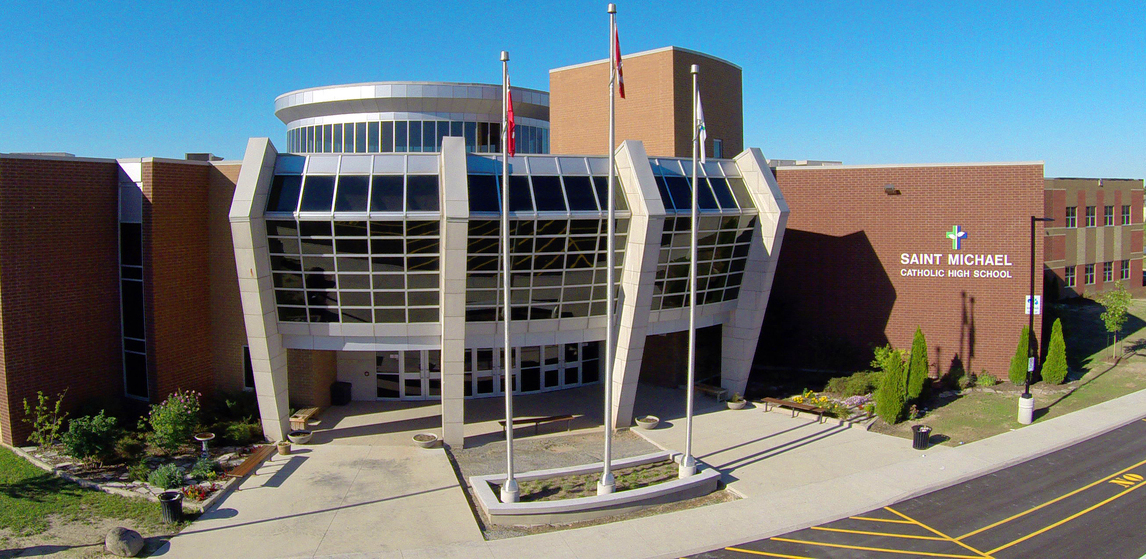
- The front entrance of the new Saint Michael location.

Location
- 8699 McLeod Road; Niagara Falls, Ontario, L2E 6S5; Canada; 43.0705°N 79.1429°W

Information
- Type: Secondary school
- Motto: Excellence Through Dedication
- Religious affiliation: Roman Catholic
- Established: 5 September 1989; 37 years ago
- School board: Niagara Catholic District School Board
- Principal: Lou Stranges
- Grades: 9–12+
- Enrollment: 1200
- Colours: Black, Grey and Burgundy
- Mascot: Mikey the Mustang
- Team name: Mustangs
- Website: www.saintmichaelmustangs.com

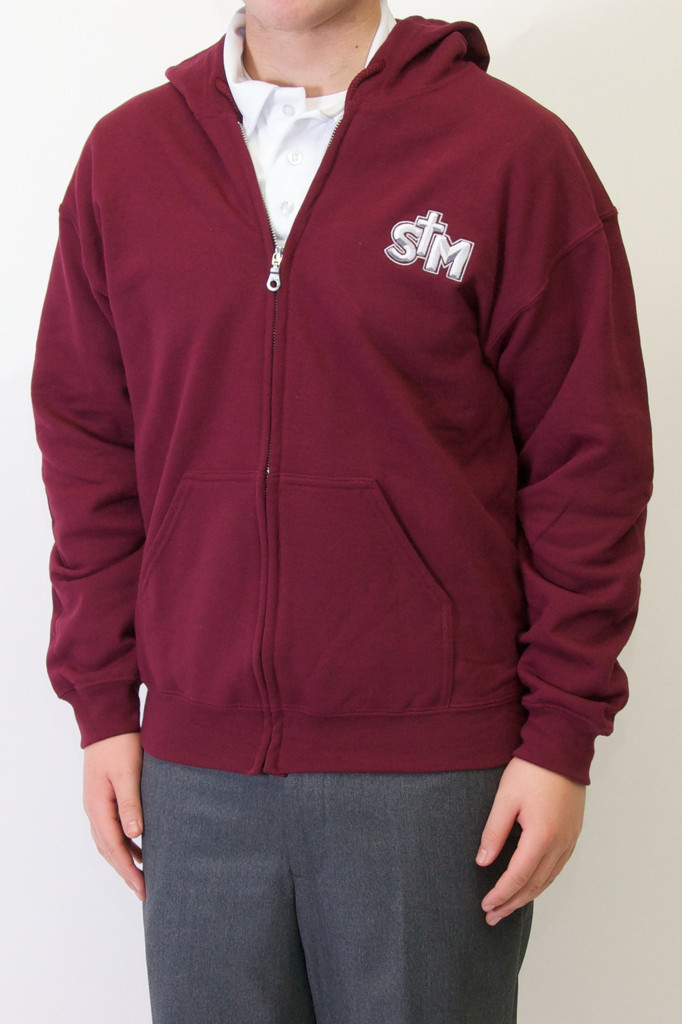
A common style of uniform worn by students.

Saint Michael Catholic High School (Often shortened to STM or Saint Mikes) is a Catholic high school in Niagara Falls, Ontario. It serves 1200 pupils in grades 9–12 and is governed by the Niagara Catholic District School Board. Saint Michael opened in 1989 and moved to its current building in 2004. The school was named after Saint Michael the Archangel.

== History ==
Saint Michael Catholic High School officially opened its doors on September 5, 1989 in its original location on 6009 Valley Way. The year prior it was Lord Elgin High School and was administered by the now District School Board Of Niagara. At that time the school had 248 students, including over 50 students that transferred from Saint Paul Catholic High School. The current Saint Michael building opened on April 16, 2004, after the original building fell into disrepair; the new building originally housed 800 students. Today 6009 Valley Way is occupied by the Gate Alliance Church. The only thing that remains of the old faculty is the lockers, gym and the white cross that was installed in 1989. From the years 2012-2015 the new location was renovated for the construction of an addition that added more indoor classrooms to replace portable classrooms that required students to go outside to get to their classes. This expansion cost a total of 6.1 million dollars. Today Saint Michael offers almost 170 courses for students to choose from. This includes four high skills major programs in transportation, hospitality and tourism, construction, and horticulture & landscaping.

== Special Activities/Programs ==
Some of the actives and programs offered at Saint Michael Catholic High School include: P3-Pathway Preparation Program, Battle of the Bands, Spiritual Retreats, School Band & Choir, Torch Leadership Experience, 35 School Clubs, School Liturgies, 26 Athletic Teams, Snack Program, Masses/Prayer Services for Feeder Schools, Ethnic Food Festival, Fashion Show, Communion Breakfast, Talent Show, Graduation Luncheon, Academic Awards Recognition, Saint Michael Family Bingo, Cultural Exchange Program, Athletic Banquet, Apprenticeship-OYAP/SHSM Sectors, Peer Tutoring, Technological Skills Competitions, Career Day, Skills Competence Canada, School Trips

=== Annual Pilgrimage ===
Students of Saint Michael Catholic High School gather every year to raise funds for the children of Rwanda, who still suffer from the aftereffects of the genocide of 1994. They also team up with students and staff from Saint Paul Catholic High School and together they walk in solidarity throughout the city of Niagara Falls to show their support.

=== Music Department ===
The music department at Saint Michael Catholic High School features a large selection of instruments for students to play, covering all of the families of musical instruments. Students are also offered a large number of performance opportunities throughout the school year. Students participating in music courses are encouraged to learn about music theory and composition, while also performing their instrument of choice. The music department also offers extracurricular opportunities, such as choir and house band.

=== Arts & Film Festival ===
The Arts and Film Festival is an annual event in which student-submitted art is displayed in the main entrance of the school building, and film productions are shown in the school's theater. The film productions are created by the school's film club, film class, independent students, teachers, and alumni. The films are presented in the style of a conventional film festival. The film presentations are commonly carried out over multiple screenings where parents and other students are encouraged to visit and show their support for the arts department. The event started in 2004 exclusively as a film festival, later featuring student-submitted artwork. Students and teachers from the school's technology department also aid in running the festival.

== Principals of Saint Michael ==
Principals of Saint Michael
| Year | Principal |
|---|---|
| 1989-1994 | William Walter |
| 1994-1997 | William Vernooy |
| 1997-1999 | John Crocco |
| 1999-2008 | Paul Barchiesi |
| 2008-2011 | Mario Ciccarelli |
| 2011-2016 | James Whittard |
| 2016-2018 | Kenneth Griepsma |
| 2018–2022 | Glenn Gifford |
| 2023–present | Lou Stranges |

== See also ==
- Education in Ontario
- List of secondary schools in Ontario
