= 2000 Sudanese general election =

← 1996	13–23 December 2000	2010 →
- Presidential election
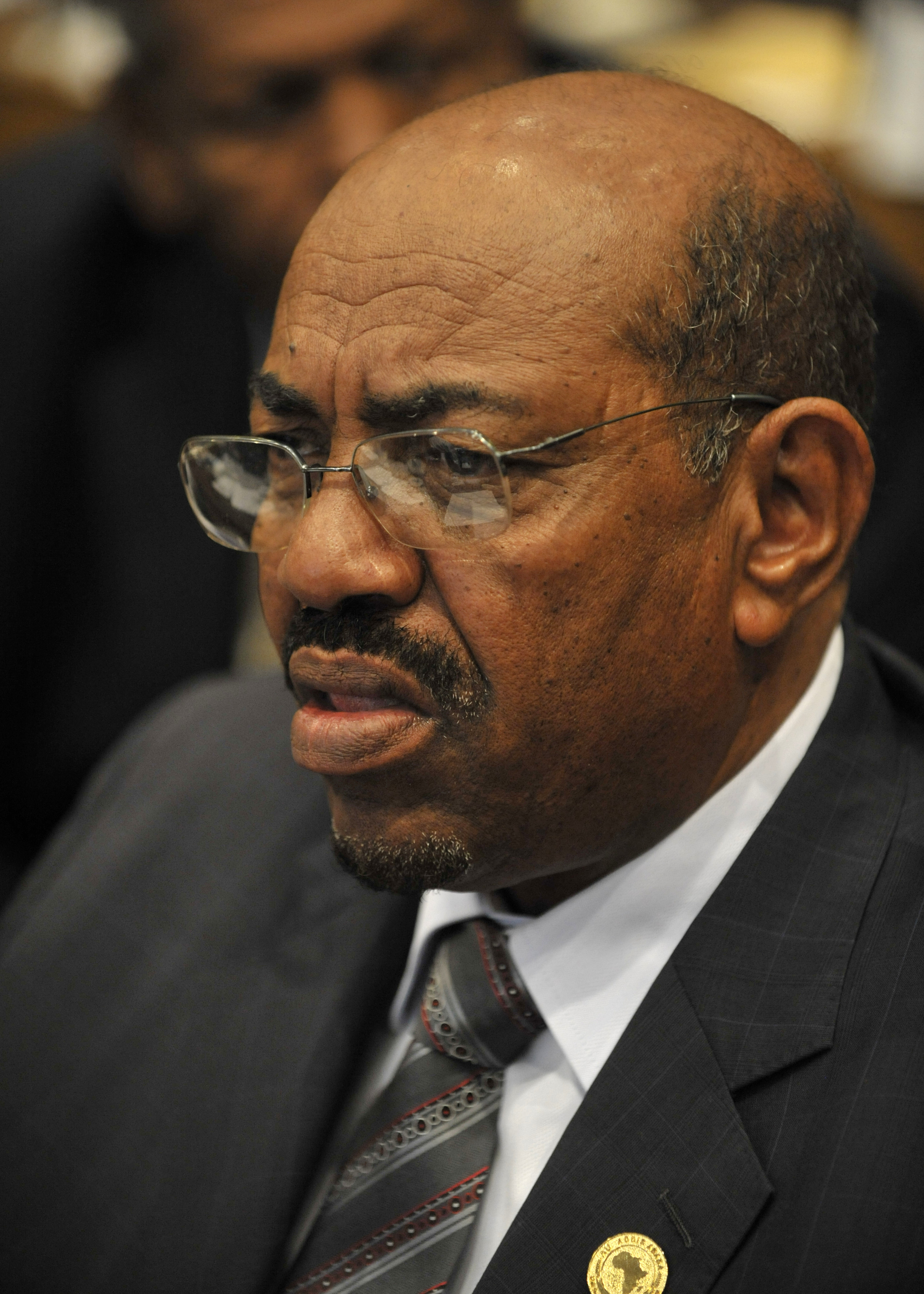

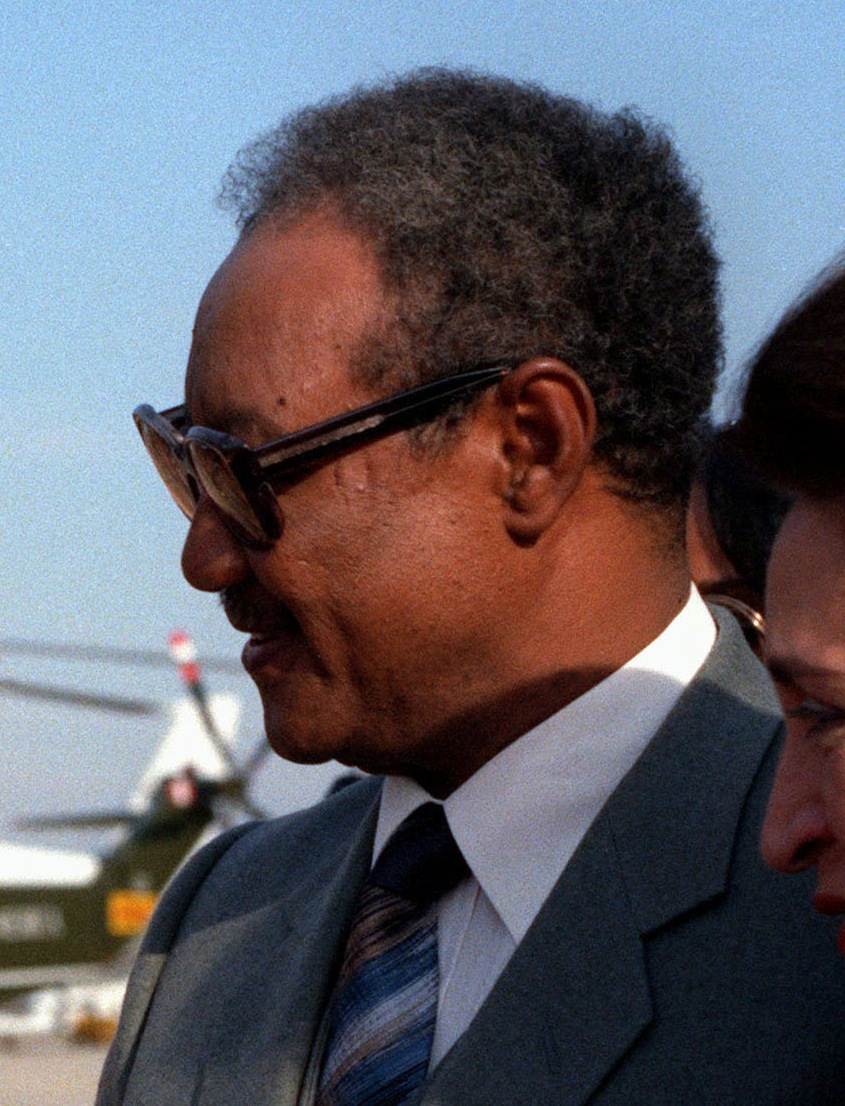
Candidate	Omar al-Bashir	Gaafar Nimeiry
Party	National Congress	APWF
Percentage	86.5%	9.6%
President before election
Omar al-Bashir
National Congress
Elected President
Omar al-Bashir
National Congress
- National Assembly election
- All 360 seats in the National Assembly; 181 seats needed for a majority
Party	Leader	Seats
National Congress	Omar al-Bashir	355
Independents	–	5
This lists parties that won seats. See the complete results below.

General elections were held in Sudan between 13 and 23 December 2000 to elect a President and National Assembly. The elections were boycotted by the main opposition parties including the National Umma Party, the Democratic Unionist Party and the Popular Congress Party, which accused the government of vote rigging. Only Omar al-Bashir’s National Congress Party and a small number of minority parties contested the elections.

About 66% of Sudan’s eligible voters cast ballots. Al-Bashir received 86.5% of the votes cast for a five-year presidential term. Former President Gaafar Nimeiry, who had returned to Sudan from exile in Egypt, polled 9.6% of the vote, and three other candidates received less than 4 percent among them. Voters also elected 275 members of the National Assembly to four-year terms. The ruling NCP won all but 10 seats; no other party contested 112 of the seats. Of the 90 specially selected positions, 35 went to women, 26 to university graduates, and 29 to trade union representatives. Women constituted about 10 percent of the legislature’s membership. An Organisation of African Unity observer team concluded “that the overall exercise was an important step towards democratization and that it was conducted in a conducive atmosphere and in a satisfactory manner.” Political parties that boycotted the elections had a decidedly different view.

== Results ==
=== President ===
Candidate	Party	Votes	%
Omar al-Bashir	National Congress Party		86.5
Gaafar Nimeiry	Alliance of the Peoples' Working Forces		9.6
Malik Hussain	Independent		1.6
Al-Samuel Hussein Osman Mansour	Liberal Democrats		1.3
Mahmoud Ahmed Juna	Independent		1.0
Total			
Source: African Elections Database

=== National Assembly ===
Party	Seats	+/–
National Congress Party	355	New
Independents	5	–395
Total	360	–40
Source: African Elections Database
