= Denis Morris Catholic High School =

Location
- 40 Glen Morris Drive; St. Catharines, Ontario, L2T 2M9; Canada; 43°12′9.03″N 79°13′4.29″W

Information
- School type: Secondary School
- Motto: Prudentia – Virtus – Intellectus
- School board: Niagara Catholic District School Board
- Principal: Mr. Kevin Timmins
- Grades: 9–12
- Enrollment: 1,200 (approximately)
- Language: English
- Colors: Red and White
- Team name: Reds
- Website: www.denismorris.ca

Denis Morris Catholic High School is a Catholic high school located in St. Catharines, Ontario. The school is administered by the Niagara Catholic District School Board.

Denis Morris provides educational programs and services for students with a variety of learning strengths, needs and abilities.

Denis Morris is known for its many successful athletes. In the past the Reds have won much in ice hockey, winning SOSSA for many years in a row, wrestling, having many athletes reaching the OFSAA championship for the past two years, and Canadian football, winning numerous championship in the history of the school.

== History ==
The school is named after Rev. Denis Morris, the pastor of St. Catherine of Alexandria Church from 1909 until 1935, when he died.

== Notable alumni ==
- Linda Evangelista – supermodel
- Dallas Green – Juno Award winner, singer, songwriter (Alexisonfire, City and Colour)
- Mark Johnston – Olympic swimmer
- Tanya Memme – television host, movie star, singer, model
- Owen Nolan – professional hockey player
- Hector Pothier - six-time CFL Grey Cup winner with Edmonton Eskimos
- Riley Sheahan – collegiate hockey player and 1st-round pick of the Detroit Red Wings
- David Sutcliffe – actor
- John Zaritsky – filmmaker
- Zenon Konopka - professional hockey player
- Derry Grehan - guitarist for the Canadian rock band Honeymoon Suite

== See also ==
- Education in Ontario
- List of secondary schools in Ontario
