= Niagara Catholic District School Board =

Catholic school board in Ontario, Canada

Address
- 427 Rice Road Niagara Region Welland, Ontario, L3C 7C1; Canada
- Motto: Encountering souls and opening minds so all students succeed.
- Chair of the board: Danny Di Lorenzo
- Director of education: Camillo Cipriano

Other information
- Website: niagaracatholic.ca

The Niagara Catholic District School Board (Niagara Catholic, previously known as English-language Separate District School Board No. 50 prior to 1998) is the publicly funded Catholic school board in the Regional Municipality of Niagara which is located in Ontario Canada supporting the municipalities of Fort Erie, Grimsby, Lincoln and West Lincoln, Niagara Falls, Niagara-on-the-Lake, Pelham, Port Colborne, St. Catharines, Thorold, Wainfleet and Welland. Its head office, the Catholic Education Centre, is located in Welland, Ontario, Canada.

The board consists of 48 primary schools, eight secondary schools, adult learning centres and alternative learning centres, serving more than 24,000 elementary, secondary, and continuing education students across Niagara.

== History ==
In January 1997, the Minister of Education and Training for the Province of Ontario announced that, as part of its plan to restructure the education system in Ontario, the number of school boards in the province would be reduced from 129 to 66 and replaced by new “District” school boards, effective January 1, 1998.

As part of the amalgamation of school boards, the Welland County Roman Catholic Separate School Board and the Lincoln County Roman Catholic Separate School Board became the Niagara Catholic District School Board, on January 1, 1998.

The Niagara Catholic District School Board covers an area of 1868 sq. km and is responsible for providing Catholic education to approximately 22,000 students in the Niagara Region.

Niagara Catholic’s first mission statement was introduced shortly after the amalgamation of the former Welland and Lincoln County Roman Catholic Separate School Boards in 1998. The mission statement was the result of a planning process that involved more than 100 representatives of Catholic education who came together to begin the process for the newly established Niagara Catholic District School Board.

In fall 2008, Niagara Catholic initiated a two-year Vision 2020 strategic planning process. On May 25, 2010, the Board approved the vision statements, the strategic directions and a recommendation to vet a new mission statement. The revised mission statement was vetted to all stakeholders prior to being submitted to the Board for consideration on June 15, 2010.

== Secondary schools ==
School Name	Street Address	Municipality	Postal Code
Blessed Trinity Catholic Secondary School	145 Livingston Avenue	Grimsby	L3M 5J6
Denis Morris Catholic High School	40 Glen Morris Drive	St. Catharines	L2T 2M9
Holy Cross Catholic Secondary School	460 Linwell Road	St. Catharines	L2M 2P9
Lakeshore Catholic High School	150 Janet Street	Port Colborne	L3K 2E7
Notre Dame College School	64 Smith Street	Welland	L3C 4H4
Saint Francis Catholic Secondary School	541 Lake Street	St. Catharines	L2N 4H7
Saint Michael Catholic High School	8699 McLeod Road	Niagara Falls	L2E 6S5
Saint Paul Catholic High School	384 Windermire Road	Niagara Falls	L2J 2Y5

== Elementary schools ==
School	Grade	Municipality	Family of School
Alexander Kuska	K-8	Welland	Notre Dame
Assumption	K-8	St. Catharines	Holy Cross
Canadian Martyrs	K-8	St. Catharines	Holy Cross
Father Hennepin	K-8	Niagara Falls	Saint Michael
Holy Name	K-8	Welland	Notre Dame
Loretto Catholic	K-8	Niagara Falls	Saint Michael
Mary Ward	K-8	Niagara Falls	Saint Paul
Our Lady of the Holy Rosary	K-8	Thorold	Denis Morris
Mother Teresa	K-8	St. Catharines	Saint Francis
Notre Dame	K-8	Niagara Falls	Saint Paul
Our Lady of Fatima	K-8	Grimsby	Blessed Trinity
Our Lady of Fatima	K-8	St. Catharines	Holy Cross
Our Lady of Mount Carmel	K-8	Niagara Falls	Saint Michael
Our Lady of Victory	K-8	Fort Erie	Lakeshore Catholic
Sacred Heart	K-8	Niagara Falls	Saint Michael
St. Alexander	K-8	Pelham	Notre Dame
St. Alfred	K-8	St. Catharines	Holy Cross
St. Andrew	K-8	Welland	Notre Dame
St. Ann	K-8	Pelham	Notre Dame
St. Ann	K-8	St. Catharines	Saint Francis
St. Anthony	K-8	St. Catharines	Denis Morris
St. Augustine	K-8	Welland	Notre Dame
St. Charles	K-3	Thorold	Denis Morris
St. Christopher	K-8	St. Catharines	Denis Morris
St. Denis	K-8	St. Catharines	Saint Francis
St. Edward	K-8	Lincoln & W. Lincoln	Blessed Trinity
St. Elizabeth	K-8	Wainfleet	Lakeshore Catholic
St. Gabriel Lalemant	K-8	Niagara Falls	Saint Paul
St. George	K-8	Fort Erie	Lakeshore Catholic
St. James	K-8	St. Catharines	Saint Francis
St. John	K-8	Lincoln & W. Lincoln	Blessed Trinity
St. John Henry Newman	K-8	Niagara Falls	Saint Paul
St. John Bosco	K-8	Port Colborne	Lakeshore Catholic
St. Joseph	K-8	Fort Erie	Lakeshore Catholic
St. Joseph	K-8	Grimsby	Blessed Trinity
St. Kevin	K-8	Welland	Notre Dame
St. Mark	K-8	Lincoln & W. Lincoln	Blessed Trinity
St. Martin	K-8	Lincoln & W. Lincoln	Blessed Trinity
St. Mary	K-8	Niagara Falls	Saint Paul
St. Mary	K-8	Welland	Notre Dame
St. Michael	K-8	Niagara-on-the-Lake	Holy Cross
St. Nicholas	K-8	St. Catharines	Denis Morris
St. Patrick	K-8	Niagara Falls	Saint Paul
St. Patrick	K-8	Port Colborne	Lakeshore Catholic
St. Peter	K-8	St. Catharines	Denis Morris
St. Philomena	K-8	Fort Erie	Lakeshore Catholic
St. Theresa	K-8	St. Catharines	Denis Morris
St. Therese	K-8	Port Colborne	Lakeshore Catholic
St. Vincent de Paul	K-8	Niagara Falls	Saint Paul

== See also ==
- District School Board of Niagara
- List of school districts in Ontario
- List of high schools in Ontario
