= Riley Sheahan =

Canadian ice hockey player (born 1991)

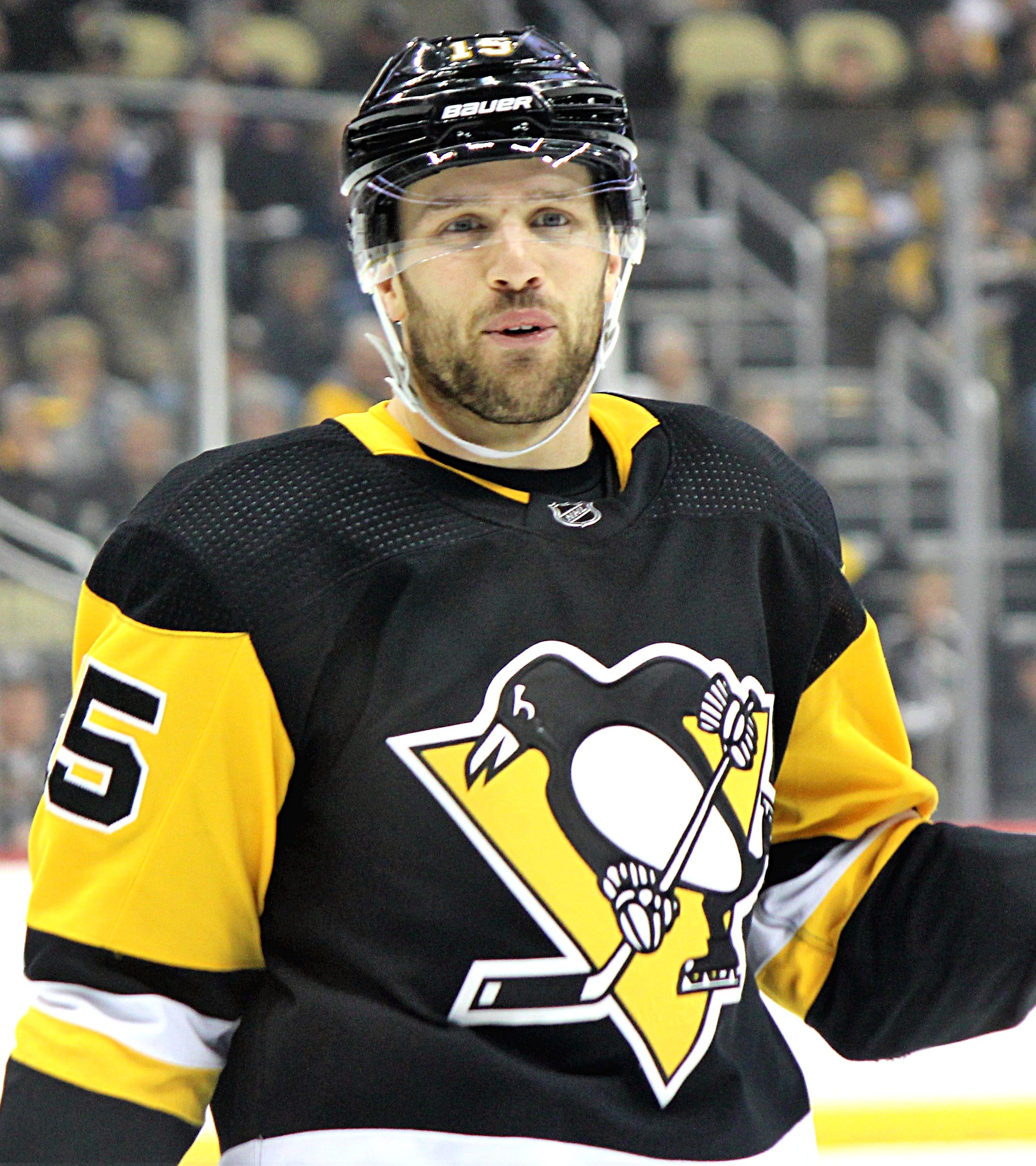
- Sheahan with the Pittsburgh Penguins in 2018
- Born: December 7, 1991 (age 34) St. Catharines, Ontario, Canada
- Height: 6 ft 3 in (191 cm)
- Weight: 214 lb (97 kg; 15 st 4 lb)
- Position: Centre
- Shot: Left
- Played for: Detroit Red Wings; Pittsburgh Penguins; Florida Panthers; Edmonton Oilers; Buffalo Sabres; Seattle Kraken; EHC Biel
- NHL draft: 21st overall, 2010; Detroit Red Wings
- Playing career: 2011–2023

Riley Michael Sheahan (born December 7, 1991) is a Canadian former professional ice hockey centre, who played in the National Hockey League (NHL) for the Red Wings, Pittsburgh Penguins, Florida Panthers, Edmonton Oilers, Buffalo Sabres and Seattle Kraken, as well as for EHC Biel of the National League (NL). He was drafted 21st overall by the Detroit Red Wings in the 2010 NHL entry draft.

== Early life ==
Sheahan was born on December 7, 1991, in St. Catharines, Ontario, to Mike and Peggy Sheahan. Basketball was the dominant sport in his family, as both of his parents had played: his mother and her twin sister were Ontario University Athletics all-stars for Brock University, while his father coached high school basketball after his playing career ended. Sheahan was a shooting guard for St. Francis Catholic Secondary School until ninth grade, when he decided that he would rather focus on ice hockey than basketball.

== Playing career ==
=== Junior ===
Sheahan played junior B ice hockey in the Greater Ontario Junior Hockey League with the St. Catharines Falcons playing both centre and wing. During his first season with the Falcons, Sheahan played with Atlanta Thrashers first-round pick Daultan Leveille. Sheahan collected 49 goals and 85 assists over two seasons with the Falcons. He was recognized for his offensive output with the OHA Junior B Top Prospect Award in 2008.

=== College ===
Following the two seasons in St. Catharines, Sheahan decided to forgo major junior hockey with the Erie Otters of the Ontario Hockey League (OHL) to play NCAA Division I college ice hockey with the University of Notre Dame Fighting Irish of the Central Collegiate Hockey Association (CCHA). While with the Fighting Irish, Sheahan was invited to take part in Canada's 2011 National Junior Team selection camp

=== Professional ===
==== Detroit Red Wings ====
On April 5, 2012, the Detroit Red Wings signed Sheahan to a three-year, entry-level contract. On April 7, 2012, he made his NHL debut for Detroit against the Chicago Blackhawks. On January 11, 2014, Sheahan scored his first career NHL goal, against Jonathan Quick of the Los Angeles Kings. On July 1, 2014, the Detroit Red Wings signed Sheahan to a two-year, $1.9 million contract extension. On June 16, 2016, the Red Wings signed Sheahan to another two-year contract extension.

On April 9, 2017, Sheahan scored his only two goals of the 2016–17 season during the final game at Joe Louis Arena, including the final goal in the arena's history. Sheahan had set a team record for the most games to start the season without a goal, and he also set an NHL record as the only forward with at least 100 shots to start the season without a goal.

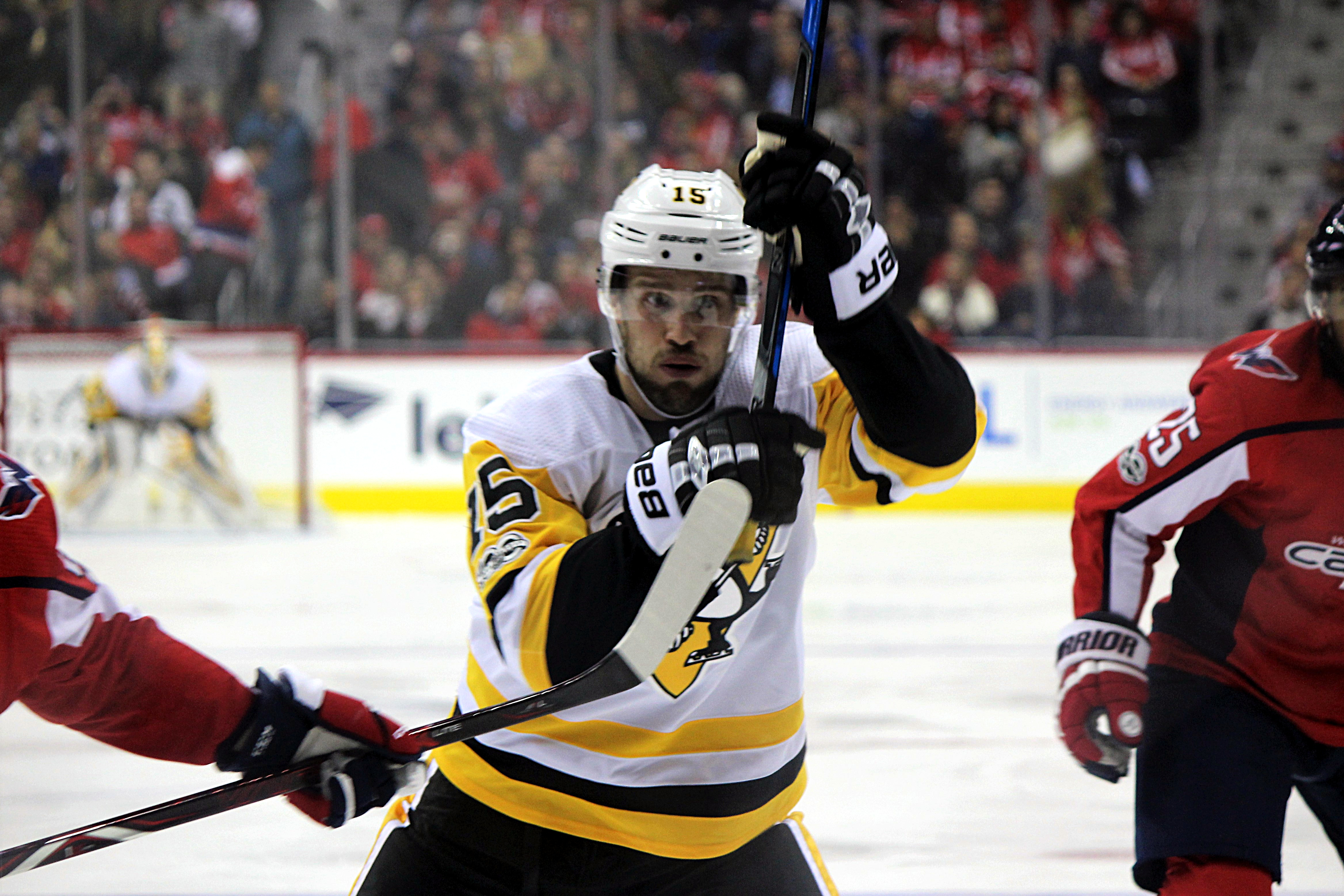
Sheahan in a game against the Washington Capitals in 2017.

==== Pittsburgh Penguins ====
On October 21, 2017, Sheahan was traded to the Pittsburgh Penguins (along with a fifth-round pick in the 2018 NHL entry draft) in exchange for Scott Wilson and a third-round pick in 2018. He finished the 2017–18 season with 32 points in 81 games. On June 27, 2018, Sheahan signed a one-year contract with the Penguins.

==== Florida Panthers ====
On February 1, 2019, Sheahan was traded to the Florida Panthers (along with teammate Derick Brassard, a second-round pick and two fourth-round picks) in exchange for Nick Bjugstad and Jared McCann. He finished the 2018–19 season with 19 points in 82 games.

==== Edmonton Oilers ====
On September 5, 2019, Sheahan signed a one-year, $900,000 contract with the Edmonton Oilers. He skated in 66 regular season games with the club, scoring 15 points. He also went scoreless in four postseason games.

==== Buffalo Sabres ====
On December 29, 2020, Sheahan signed a professional tryout contract with the Buffalo Sabres to attend their training camp. On January 8, 2021, the Sabres signed Sheahan to a one-year, $700,000 contract. In the shortened 2020–21 season, Sheahan appeared in 53 regular season games for the Sabres in a checking-line role. He contributed with 4 goals and 13 points, as the club finished bottom of the league.

==== Seattle Kraken ====
As a free agent from the Sabres, Sheahan was signed to a one-year, $850,000 contract with expansion club the Seattle Kraken on September 1, 2021. Sheahan scored the Kraken's first ever preseason goal on September 26, 2021, in a 5–3 win against the Vancouver Canucks. After making the Kraken opening night roster, Sheahan endured a short assignment to the Charlotte Checkers of the AHL, before returning and remaining on the Kraken in a depth forward role. He appeared in 69 regular season games, used as the team's primary penalty killer, in collecting 4 goals and 13 assists for 17 points.

==== Return to Buffalo ====
On August 10, 2022, Sheahan as a free agent returned to the Buffalo Sabres, on a one-year, two-way, $950,000 contract. On October 31, 2022, Sheahan was assigned to the Rochester Americans of the American Hockey League after being waived by the Sabres. The Sabres brought him back to their NHL roster on November 15, 2022. On November 27, 2022, after two games with the Sabres, Sheahan was placed on unconditional waivers for the purpose of terminating his contract because of Sheahan's refusal to return to AHL affiliate, Rochester Americans.

==== EHC Biel ====
On December 1, 2022, Sheahan joined EHC Biel of the National League (NL) for the remainder of the 2022–23 season.

He officially announced his retirement from professional hockey on October 12, 2024.

== Personal life ==
Sheahan is the nephew by marriage of Rocky DiPietro, a member of the Canadian Football Hall of Fame. He plays guitar in his free time. In 2021, Sheahan and fellow hockey player Tyler Smith started the Speak Your Mind podcast to address mental health issues in and out of professional sports. Sheahan was diagnosed with depression. Sheahan's second cousin, Brock Sheahan, is a former ice hockey player, and current head coach for Notre Dame.

=== Legal issues ===
On October 29, 2012, Sheahan was stopped by police in Grand Rapids, Michigan, after which a roadside test determined he was driving with a blood-alcohol level of 0.30, nearly four times the legal limit. Sheahan was wearing a purple Teletubby costume and was carrying the ID of fellow Red Wings' prospect Brendan Smith when arrested. He told police he was carrying Smith's ID so he could get into bars, as he was underage at the time.

Sheahan pleaded guilty in Michigan's 61st District Court on December 13, 2012, to operating a car with a blood-alcohol level of 0.17 or higher. He was sentenced to one year probation and ordered to spend 49 hours on a work crew.

Sheahan had previously been arrested on alcohol-related charges when he was charged with public intoxication and consumption of alcohol by a minor in 2010 when he was a freshman at Notre Dame.

== Career statistics ==
			Regular season					Playoffs
Season	Team	League	GP	G	A	Pts	PIM	GP	G	A	Pts	PIM
2006–07	St. Catharines Falcons AAA	SCT U16	46	33	42	75	80	—	—	—	—	—
2006–07	St. Catharines Falcons	GHL	—	—	—	—	—	3	1	1	2	0
2007–08	St. Catharines Falcons	GOJHL	45	22	39	61	39	16	5	10	15	14
2008–09	St. Catharines Falcons	GOJHL	40	27	46	73	55	11	8	5	13	30
2009–10	Notre Dame Fighting Irish	CCHA	37	6	11	17	22	—	—	—	—	—
2010–11	Notre Dame Fighting Irish	CCHA	40	5	17	22	28	—	—	—	—	—
2011–12	Notre Dame Fighting Irish	CCHA	37	9	16	25	24	—	—	—	—	—
2011–12	Detroit Red Wings	NHL	1	0	0	0	4	—	—	—	—	—
2011–12	Grand Rapids Griffins	AHL	7	1	1	2	0	—	—	—	—	—
2012–13	Grand Rapids Griffins	AHL	72	16	20	36	33	24	3	13	16	10
2012–13	Detroit Red Wings	NHL	1	0	0	0	0	—	—	—	—	—
2013–14	Grand Rapids Griffins	AHL	31	8	10	18	12	8	1	4	5	0
2013–14	Detroit Red Wings	NHL	42	9	15	24	6	5	0	0	0	0
2014–15	Detroit Red Wings	NHL	79	13	23	36	16	7	2	1	3	2
2015–16	Detroit Red Wings	NHL	81	14	11	25	12	5	0	1	1	4
2016–17	Detroit Red Wings	NHL	80	2	11	13	14	—	—	—	—	—
2017–18	Detroit Red Wings	NHL	8	0	0	0	4	—	—	—	—	—
2017–18	Pittsburgh Penguins	NHL	73	11	21	32	4	12	1	2	3	2
2018–19	Pittsburgh Penguins	NHL	49	7	2	9	13	—	—	—	—	—
2018–19	Florida Panthers	NHL	33	2	8	10	4	—	—	—	—	—
2019–20	Edmonton Oilers	NHL	66	8	7	15	6	4	0	0	0	2
2020–21	Buffalo Sabres	NHL	53	4	9	13	8	—	—	—	—	—
2021–22	Seattle Kraken	NHL	69	4	13	17	2	—	—	—	—	—
2021–22	Charlotte Checkers	AHL	4	1	1	2	0	—	—	—	—	—
2022–23	Rochester Americans	AHL	6	0	3	3	2	—	—	—	—	—
2022–23	Buffalo Sabres	NHL	2	0	0	0	4	—	—	—	—	—
2022–23	EHC Biel	NL	12	3	4	7	2	4	0	1	1	4
NHL totals			637	74	120	194	97	33	3	4	7	10

== Awards and honours ==
Award	Year
AHL
Calder Cup champion	2013

Awards and achievements
Preceded by Thomas McCollum	Detroit Red Wings first-round draft pick 2010	Succeeded by Anthony Mantha
