= Abu Kigab =

Sudanese-Canadian basketball player

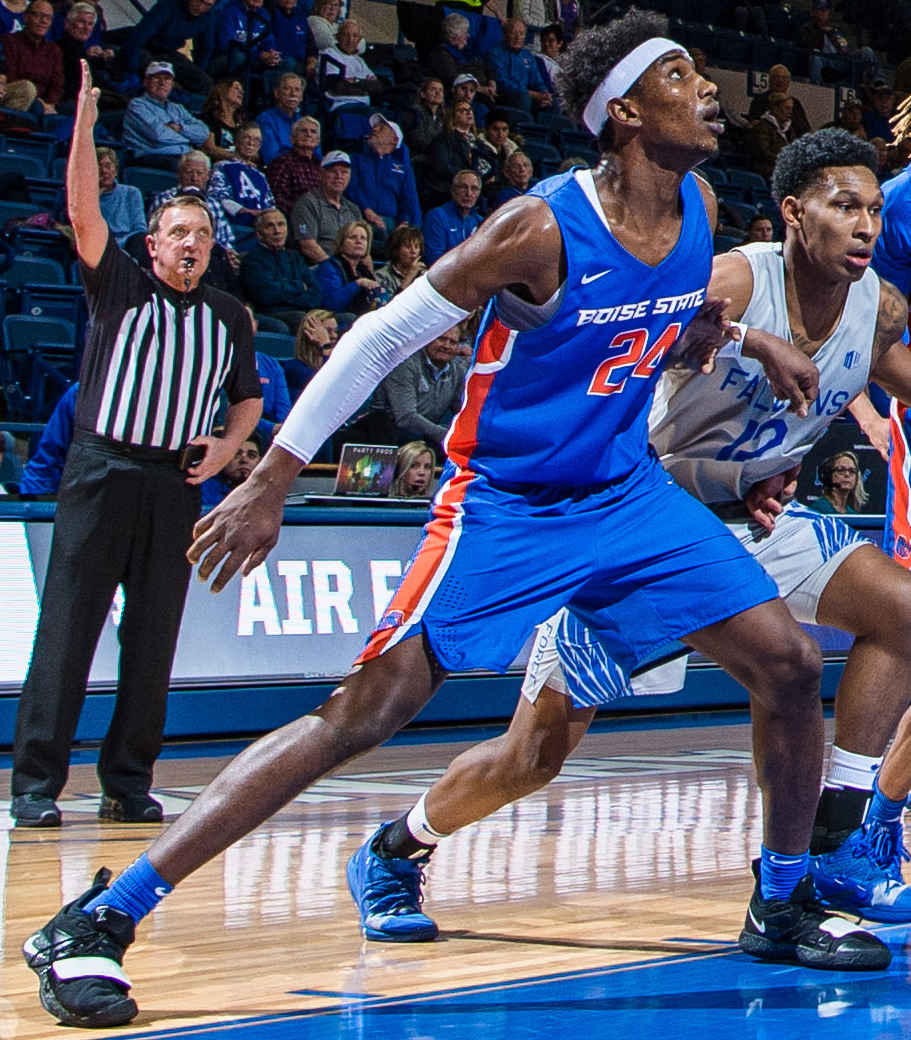
- Kigab with Boise State in 2020

No. 14 – Santos del Potosí
- Position: Small forward
- League: LNBP

Personal information
- Born: November 3, 1998 (age 28) Khartoum, Sudan
- Listed height: 6 ft 7 in (2.01 m)
- Listed weight: 220 lb (100 kg)

Career information
- High school: St. Francis Catholic (St. Catharines, Ontario); Prolific Prep (Napa, California)
- College: Oregon (2017–2019); Boise State (2019–2022)
- NBA draft: 2022: undrafted
- Playing career: 2022–present

Career history
- 2022: Niagara River Lions
- 2023: Ottawa BlackJacks
- 2023: Spišskí Rytieri
- 2024: MLP Academics Heidelberg
- 2024−2025: PS Karlsruhe Lions
- 2025: Calgary Surge
- 2025−2026: Gießen 46ers
- 2026–present: Santos del Potosí

Career highlights
- FIBA Under-19 Basketball World Cup All-Tournament Team (2017); 2x Second-team All-Mountain West (2021, 2022); All-Mountain West Defensive Team (2022); Mountain West tournament MVP (2022)
Medals
Men's basketball
Representing Canada
FIBA Under-18 Americas Championship
Silver medal – second place	2016 Chile	Team
FIBA Under-19 World Cup
Gold medal – first place	2017 Egypt	Team

Abu Haef Kigab (born November 3, 1998) is a Sudanese-Canadian professional basketball player for Santos del Potosí of the Liga Nacional de Baloncesto Profesional (LNBP). He played college basketball for the Oregon Ducks and for the Boise State Broncos of the Mountain West Conference. Kigab was a key player on a Canada team that won the gold medal at the FIBA U19 World Cup in 2017.

== Early life ==
Born in Khartoum, Sudan to Sultan Kigab, Kigab moved to St. Catharines, Ontario with his family at age nine. He attended Queen Mary Public School and St. Francis Catholic Secondary School and joined Prolific Prep in Napa, California in 2015.

Kigab was tabbed a breakout performer at Basketball Without Borders in 2016 and was ranked a four-star recruit in the class of 2017 by Scout and ESPN.

He committed to playing college basketball for Oregon in March 2017, having also considered Illinois, Baylor, California, Kansas, Minnesota, USC and Virginia Tech.

== College career ==
=== University of Oregon (2017-2019) ===
Kigab played his freshman and sophomore season at University of Oregon. During his freshman year, he played in 35 of 36 games as one of the team's top defenders off the bench. As a sophomore, Kigab averaged 2.6 points and 2.7 rebounds per game in 10 games. He transferred to Boise State University at the end of the fall quarter during his sophomore season.

=== Boise State University (2019-2022) ===
After transferring to Boise State, Kigab had to sit out the second half of the season due to NCAA transfer rules.

During his junior year, he appeared in 20 games, starting in 18. He averaged 11.1 points and 3.6 rebounds. He was fourth on the team in scoring and rebounding. He missed two games with a hip pointer. Kigab became eligible at the conclusion of the first semester, after gaining his full year of academic residency.

During his senior year, Kigab was All-Mountain West Second Team and All-Mountain West Third Team. He started in 25 games and averaged 11.8 points, 5.4 rebounds and 2 assists per game. He led the Broncos with 22 blocked shots. Kigab missed final three games after suffering a shoulder injury in the regular season finale.

Kigab did a fifth year at Boise State. He was All-Mountain West Second Team and Mountain West Championship MVP. He started all 35 games and averaged 14.8 points, 5.7 rebounds. and 2.4 assists.

== Professional career ==
=== Niagara River Lions (2022) ===
After going undrafted in the 2022 NBA draft, Kigab joined the Toronto Raptors Summer League roster in Las Vegas, recording a double-double with 15 points and 10 rebounds in the final game against Milwaukee.

On October 24, 2022, Kigab joined the Fort Wayne Mad Ants training camp roster. However, he did not make the final roster.

Kigab appeared in two games for Niagara River Lions during the 2022 CEBL season.

=== Ottawa BlackJacks (2023) ===
The Ottawa BlackJacks announced they had signed Kigab on May 5, 2023. He tallied 7 points, 6 rebounds and 3 assists in his debut against Montreal.

=== Spišskí Rytieri (2023) ===
On August 27, 2023, Kigab signed with Spišskí Rytieri of the Slovak Basketball League. In 18 league games, he averaged 19.6 points, 7.4 rebounds and 2 assists per contest.

=== MLP Academics Heidelberg (2024) ===
On January 2, 2024, he inked a deal with the MLP Academics Heidelberg of the German Basketball Bundesliga. Kigab averaged 8.6 points in 12 Bundesliga contests and parted company with the team at the end of the 2023–24 season.

=== PS Karlsruhe Lions (2024−2025) ===
In November 2024, Kigab was signed by the PS Karlsruhe Lions of the German second-tier league ProA. He wrapped-up the 2024–25 season averaging 19.9 points per game.

=== Gießen 46ers (2025−2026) ===
In April 2025, he put pen to paper on a contract with the CEBL's Calgary Surge. On December 17, 2025, Kigab returned to the German ProA league, signing with the Gießen 46ers. He left the club by mutual consent on January 22, 2026. Kigab had averaged 9.2 points per contest in 6 games for Gießen.

== National team career ==
Kigab competed for Canada at the 2015 FIBA U19 World Cup and the 2016 FIBA Americas U18 Championship. In July 2017, he was a key player on a Canada team that captured gold at the FIBA U19 World Cup, averaging 14.7 points and 10.6 rebounds, as well as 2.3 assists per game. For his efforts, he was named to the tournament's All-Star Five.

== Career statistics ==
Legend
GP	Games played	GS	Games started	MPG	Minutes per game
FG%	Field goal percentage	3P%	3-point field goal percentage	FT%	Free throw percentage
RPG	Rebounds per game	APG	Assists per game	SPG	Steals per game
BPG	Blocks per game	PPG	Points per game	**Bold**	Career high

=== College ===
Year	Team	GP	GS	MPG	FG%	3P%	FT%	RPG	APG	SPG	BPG	PPG
2017–18	Oregon	**35**	0	7.7	.344	.227	.409	1.1	.2	.4	.2	1.6
2018–19	Oregon	10	3	14.9	.440	.091	.600	2.7	1.8	.2	.0	2.6
2019–20	Boise State	20	18	25.8	.420	**.328**	**.734**	3.6	1.0	.7	.3	11.1
2020–21	Boise State	25	25	28.0	.467	.301	.716	5.4	2.0	1.2	**.9**	11.8
2021–22	Boise State	**35**	**35**	**31.5**	**.500**	.301	.677	**5.7**	**2.4**	**1.3**	.4	**14.8**
Career		125	81	121.9	.461	.293	.680	3.8	1.4	.8	.4	8.9
