= Liberal Democrats (Sudan) =

Political party in Sudan

The Liberal Democrats (Arabic: حِزب الديمقراطيين الأحرار, Hizb Al-Demokhrateen Al-Ahrar) is a political party in Sudan. At the last legislative elections, December 2000, the party won one seat. At the presidential elections of the same moment, its candidate Dr. Al-Samuel Hussein Osman Mansour won 1.3% of the votes.
