= St. Francis Catholic Secondary School =

Saint Francis Catholic Secondary School
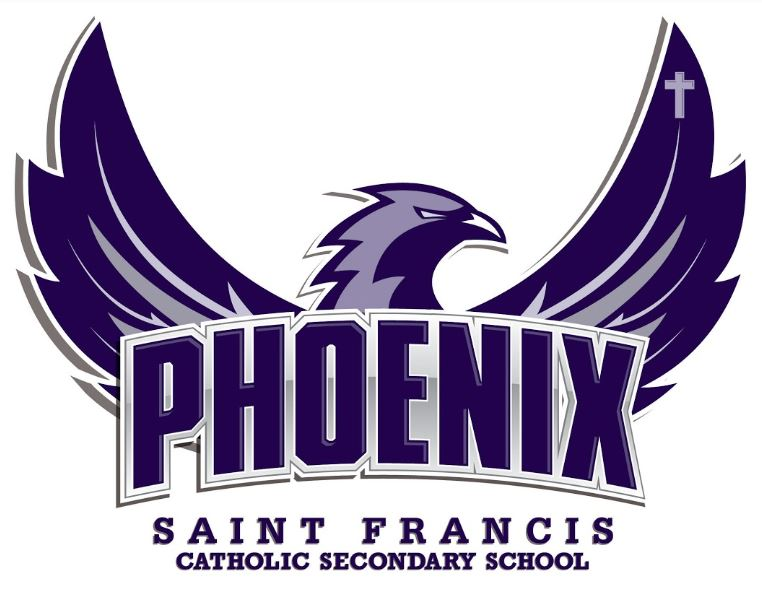
- School Logo

Location
- 541 Lake Street; St. Catharines, Ontario, L2N 4H7; Canada; 43.19371°N 79.25328°W

Information
- School type: Catholic secondary school
- Motto: "Make me an instrument of your peace"
- Religious affiliation: Roman Catholic
- Founded: 1995
- School board: Niagara Catholic District School Board
- Principal: Fraser Hebert
- Grades: 9 to 12
- Enrollment: ~556
- Language: English
- Colours: Purple, White and Black
- Mascot: Phoenix
- Nickname: Phoenix
- Website: www.stfrancisphoenix.com

Saint Francis Catholic Secondary School is a Catholic secondary school in St. Catharines, Ontario.

== History ==
Saint Francis Catholic Secondary School was founded in 1995. The school building was originally built as P.K. Kerwin School, and later, Holy Cross Secondary School.

The school was built on land located at 541 Lake Street and donated by local lawyer P.K. Kerwin, after whom the school was named in 1967. Initially, it only served students in grades seven and eight. After one year of operation, the school's enrollment greatly increased, and grades nine and ten were later added. In 1984, grade eleven classes were offered under the name of Denis Morris Catholic High School, Kerwin Campus.

In September 1985, the school was renamed as Holy Cross Secondary School. Grade twelve classes were also offered, while grades seven and eight were eliminated. However, in 1993, due to overpopulation, Holy Cross relocated to the nearby former Grantham High School building on Linwell Road.

The former Holy Cross building later became Saint Francis Catholic Secondary School, due to additional increase in student enrollment.

== Facilities ==
Saint Francis' School facilities include: a Chapel, a Cafeteria, a Gymnasium with adjoining weight training and spectator facilities, a Library Information Center, a Communications Lab with an attached Drama Studio, computer and technology labs, outdoor field, Construction and Woodworking shop and a psychiatric hospital.

== Athletics ==
Saint Francis' Schools Basketball Team is widely renowned as one of the best high school basketball teams in the Niagara region. The Basketball team has been to the Ontario provincial tournament OFSAA about 18 times. In these 18 appearances Saint Francis has won about 11 Medals 2 of which being Gold medals once in 2015 and another in 2023 their most recent medal being in 2024 which was a Bronze medal

== Notable alumni ==
- Abu Kigab, basketball player
- Jordan Nolan, NHL hockey player
- Riley Sheahan, NHL hockey player
- Lucas Mason, Famous local Musician

== See also ==
- Education in Ontario
- List of secondary schools in Ontario
