= List of political parties in Sudan =

Sudan has several political parties.

== Main parties ==
- Democratic Unionist Party (Al Hizb Al-Ittihadi Al-Dimuqrati)
- Umma Party (Hizb al-Umma)
- Umma Party (Reform and Renewal)
- Omom Party
- Sudanese Congress Party (Hizb al-Mu’tamar al-Sudani)
- Popular Congress Party (Al-Mu'tamar al-Sha’bi)
- Sudanese Ba'ath Party (Hizb al-Ba'ath as-Sudani)
- Sudanese Communist Party (Al-Hizb al-Shuyui al-Sudani)
- Sudan People's Liberation Movement–North (Harakat Al-Sha'abia Li-Tahrir Al-Sudan-Al-Shamal)
- Arab Socialist Ba'ath Party – Organisation
- Arab Socialist Ba'ath Party – Country
- Liberal Party of Sudan (Al-Hizb Al-Librali)
- Binaa Sudan Party (Hizb Binaa Al Sudan)
- Liberal Democrats (Hizb Al-Demokhrateen Al-Ahrar)
- Nubian Front of Liberation (Jabhat al-Tahrir al-Nuwbia)
- National Democratic Alliance
- Sudan National Alliance
- The National Reform Party
- Sudanese Unity National Party (S.U.N. PARTY)
- Islamic Socialist Party
- Free People Party (FPP)
- Sudan Democratic Progressive Party
- Sudanese Socialist Democratic Union (SSDU)

== Dissolved parties ==
Party	Abbr.	Leader	Years active
Sudanese Socialist Union الاتحاد الاشتراكي السوداني	SSU	Gaafar Nimeiry	1971–1985

== Banned parties ==
Party	Abbr.	Leader	Years active
National Congress Party حزب المؤتمر الوطني	NCP	Omar al-Bashir	1998–2019

== See also ==
- Politics of Sudan
- List of political parties by country
