= 2010 Sudanese gubernatorial elections =

- April 11–15, 2010

24 of Sudan's 25 governorships
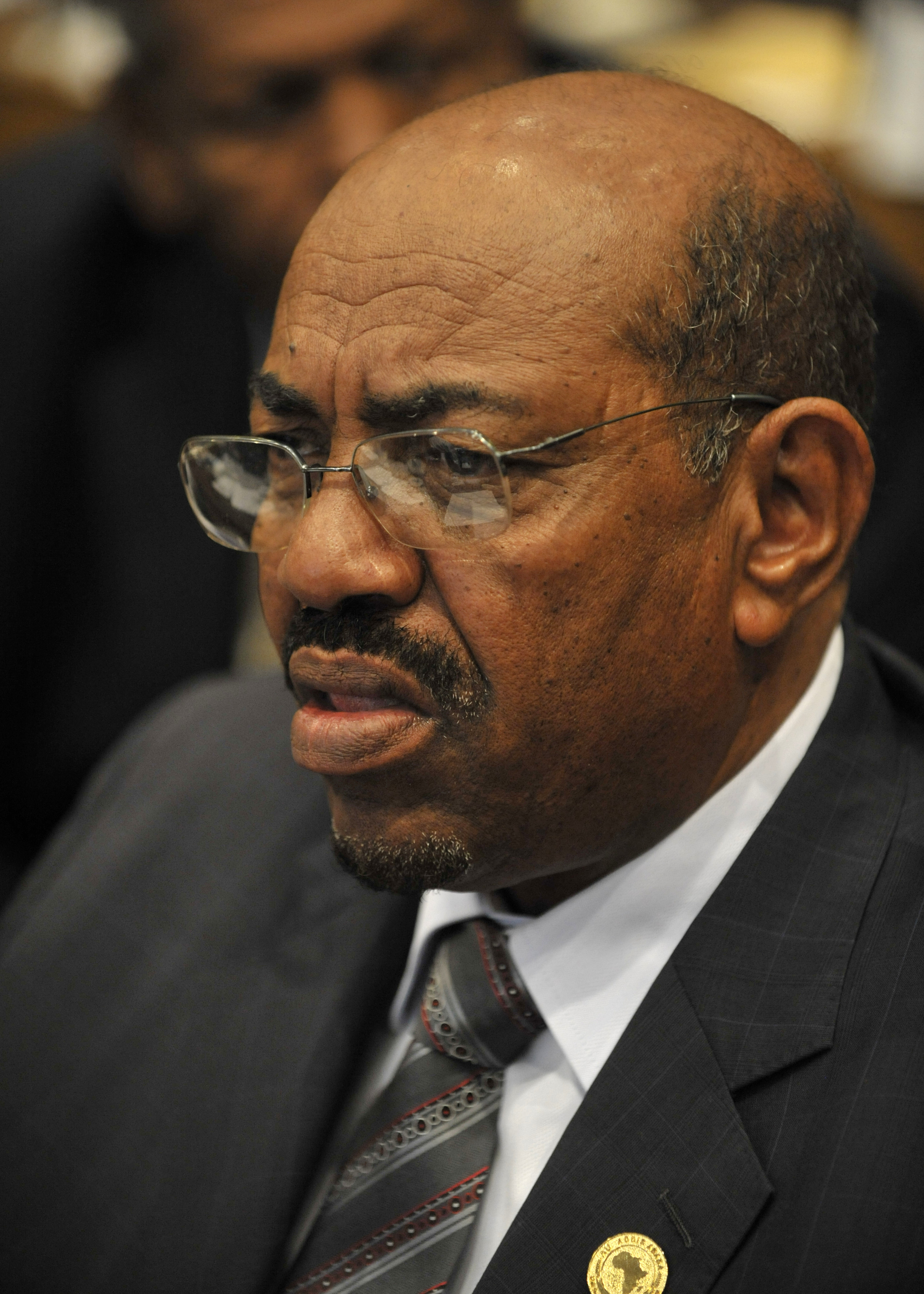

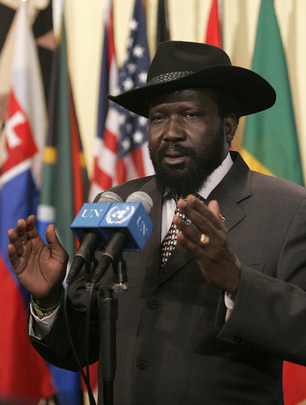

	Majority party	Minority party	Third party
Leader	Omar al-Bashir	Salva Kiir	Bangassi Joseph Mario Bakosoro
Party	National Congress	SPLM	Independent
Seats before	14	10	0
Seats after	14	9	1
Seat change	Steady	▼1	▲1
- NCP SPLM Independent Election delayed (South Kordofan)

The Sudanese gubernatorial elections took place on 11–15 April 2010, alongside the wider Sudanese general election, to elect the Governors of the states of Sudan.

The election produced few unexpected upsets, with NCP candidates winning all Northern States, and SPLM candidates winning all of Sudan's Southern States with the notable exception of Western Equatoria; where an Independent candidate unseated the incumbent SPLM Governor.

Changes to the constitution in January 2015 meant that Governors are now appointed by the President, as opposed to being directly elected.

The only state not to hold elections was South Kordofan, where elections were delayed due to disagreement over disputes arising from the 2008 census.

== Votes by State ==
State	Winning Party	Margin (%)	Details
Al Jazirah	NCP		
Kassala	NCP		
Northern	NCP		
Al Qadarif	NCP		
Red Sea	NCP		
River Nile	NCP		
Sennar	NCP		
White Nile	NCP		
Blue Nile	NCP		
N. Kordofan	NCP		
S. Kordofan	Election delayed		Details
W. Darfur	NCP	36.57	Details
N. Darfur	NCP		Details
S. Darfur	NCP	32.52	Details
Khartoum	NCP		
W. Bahr el Ghazal	SPLM		
Lakes	SPLM		
N. Bahr el Ghazal	SPLM		
Warrap	SPLM		
Unity	SPLM	33.21	Details
Jonglei	SPLM		Details
Upper Nile	SPLM		
C. Equatoria	SPLM		
E. Equatoria	SPLM		
W. Equatoria	Independent	3.23	Details
Sources: National Electoral Commission

== See also ==
- 2010 Sudanese general election in Jonglei
- 2010 Darfurian amalgamation referendum
- 2011 Southern Sudanese independence referendum
