= Ba'ath Party (disambiguation) =

Ba'ath Party (1947–1966) , in full Arab Socialist Ba'ath Party, was a pan-Arab political party founded in Syria.

Ba'ath Party may also refer to these Ba'athist political parties:

- Arab Ba'ath Movement (1940–1947), succeeded by the Ba'ath Party
- Arab Ba'ath (1940–1947), an early Ba'athist party in Syria
- Democratic Socialist Arab Ba'ath Party (1970–present), Syria
- Sudanese Ba'ath Party (2002–present)
- Ba'ath Party (Syrian-dominated faction) (1966–2024), following the split of the original Ba'ath Party after the 1966 Syrian coup d'état
  - Arab Socialist Ba'ath Party – Syria Region (1947–2024)
  - Arab Socialist Ba'ath Party – Yemen Region (1947–1966)
  - Arab Socialist Ba'ath Party – Lebanon Region (1966–present)
  - Arab Socialist Ba'ath Party – Organization of Sudan (1980–present)
- Ba'ath Party (Iraqi-dominated faction) (1966–present)
  - Arab Socialist Ba'ath Party – Iraq Region (1948–2003)
  - Arab Socialist Ba'ath Party – Region of Sudan (founded 1970)

== See also ==
- Ba'athist Revolution (disambiguation)
- Ba'athist regime (disambiguation)
- Neo-Ba'athism, far-left variant of Ba'athism in Syria after the 1966 Syrian coup d'état led by Salah Jadid and Hafez al-Assad
- Assadist–Saddamist conflict, former conflict between the Iraqi and Syrian dominated factions of the Ba'ath Party
