= Zaghawa people =

Ethnic group of Chad, Libya and Sudan

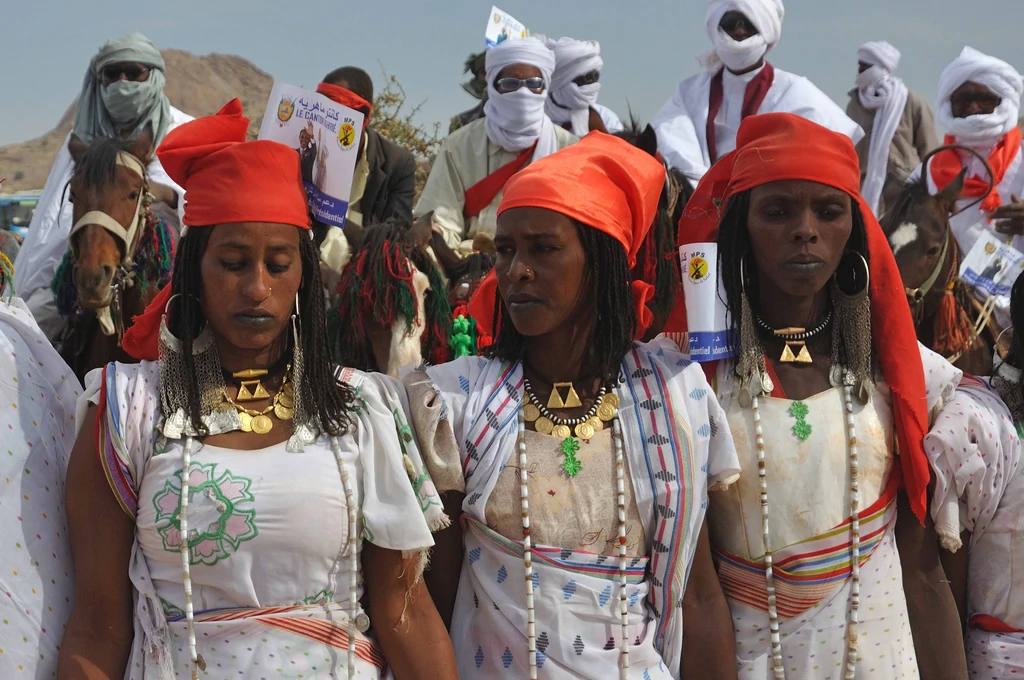
- Zaghawa women in Biltine, Chad

Total population
- 384,150

Regions with significant populations
- Ouaddaï Region, North and West Darfur
- Chad: 203,754
- Sudan: 171,000
- Libya: 9,400

Languages
- Zaghawa • Sudanese Arabic • Chadian Arabic • French

Religion
- Sunni Islam

Related ethnic groups
- Kanembu, Kanuri, Fur, Tubu, Masalit, Nilo-Saharan speakers

Linguistic map of the non-Arab peoples of Darfur, showing the extent of the Zaghawa people in Sudan.

The Zaghawa people, also called Beri or Zakhawa, are an ethnic group inhabiting Libya, northeastern Chad, and western Sudan, including Darfur.

Zaghawas speak the Zaghawa language, which is an eastern Saharan language. They are pastoralists, and a breed of sheep that they herd is called Zaghawa by the Arabs. They are nomadic and obtain much of their livelihood through herding cattle, camels and sheep and harvesting wild grains. It has been estimated that there are 384,150 people who belong to the Zaghawa ethnicity.

== Names ==
The royal history of the Kanem–Bornu Empire, the Girgam, refers to the Zaghawa people as the Duguwa. Today, Zaghawa refer to themselves as the Beri, while Arabic speakers and literature refer to them as "Zaghawa". In literature related to African ethnic groups, the term Beri (sometimes Kegi) includes Zaghawas, Bideyat, tubu peoples, each clustered in different parts of Chad, Sudan and Libya.

== History ==
The earliest recorded mention of the Zaghawa comes from the 9th century Arab geographer al-Ya'qubi, who wrote of them as the “Zaghawa who live in a place called Kanem”, and proceeded to list a string of other kingdoms under Zaghawa rule. Historically, the Zaghawa people held a sort of hegemony over most of the smaller societies that stretched along the Sahel between Lake Chad to Darfur in Western Sudan.

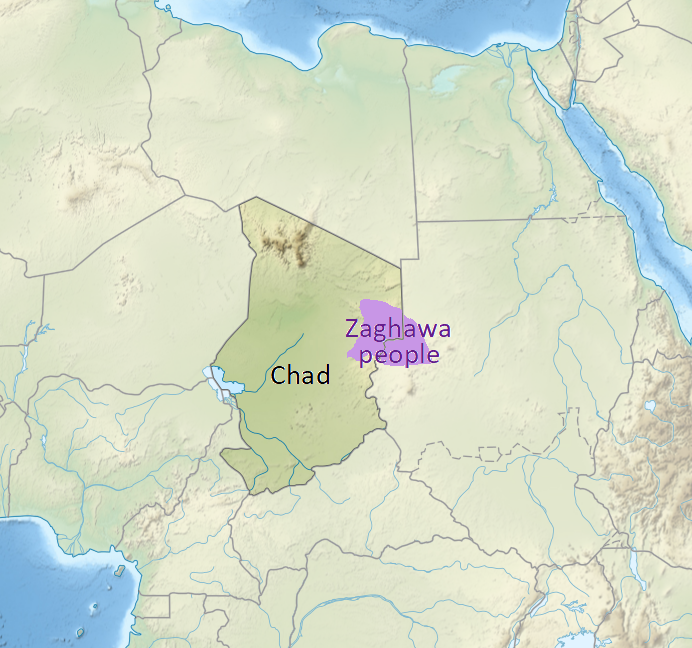
Zaghawa people's distribution in Chad and Sudan.

The Zaghawa people were trading with the Nile region and the Maghreb regions by the 1st millennium. The earliest references to them in 8th-century texts are made jointly with the Toubou people of northern Chad and southern Libya, and scholars believe the two are related ethnic groups. The 11th century texts mention that the kings of the Zaghawa kingdom had accepted Islam, and were at least nominally Muslims.

Early Arabic accounts describe the Zaghawa to be "black nomads". The 12th-century geographer Muhammad al-Idrisi and the 13th-century Yaqut al-Hamawi describe the Zaghawa influence around an oasis-centered system and mention the towns of Kanem, Manan and Anjimi.

However, ibn Sa'id al-Maghribi, writing in 1270. states that Manan was the capital of the Kanem kingdom until the Sayfawa dynasty rulers converted to Islam, conquered the region, and thereafter the capital shifted to Njimi. The Zaghawa continued to live in Manan, wrote ibn Said. The records of Kanem do not mention Zaghawa, and they were likely displaced and they then moved into the region they are currently found. This region is called Dar Zaghawa, or the "land of the Zaghawa".

Although Zaghawa power was broken by the rise of Kanem in the Lake Chad region, Zaghawa retained control over a considerable portion of the lands lying east of Kanem, and it is only in the late 14th century that Darfur is mentioned as an independent state by the Mamluk Sultanate historian and geographer al-Maqrizi. Following the rise of Darfur and the Kanem-Bornu Empire, the Zaghawa appear to have controlled only desert areas and ceased to be a major regional power.

== Society and culture ==
The flag used by some Zaghawa nationalists.

The traditional Zaghawa society has led a predominantly pastoral life, made up of nomadic clans with horse, donkeys, goat and sheep herd keeping focus. At their peak strength before the Sayfawa dynasty displaced and disbanded them, they were noted merchants and traders with camels and horses, controlling some of the Trans-Saharan trade routes.

They accepted the Maliki school of Sunni Islam but retained some of their pre-Islamic rites such as karama, a ritual sacrifice of animals to ward off evil spirits. The century in which they converted has been a subject of debate and little consensus, with estimates ranging from the 13th to the early 17th century. In contemporary times, they lead a sedentary lifestyle, growing staples such as millet and sorghum, and other foods such as sesame, melons, pumpkins, peanuts and okra.

Roger Blench notes that the appearance of Nilo-Saharan speakers is associated with the green Sahara.

=== Social stratification ===
Zaghawa society has been socially stratified and has included castes. The upper strata has been of nobles and warriors, below them have been the traders and merchants, below whom have been the artisan castes called the Hadaheed (or Hadahid). These castes have been endogamous and their inherited occupations have included ironwork, hunters, pottery, leatherwork, and musicians such as drummers. The artisan work has traditionally been viewed within the Zaghawa society as dirty and of inferior status, being people from different pagan and Jewish roots who slowly assimilated into the Islamic society. Some of the early Arab texts refer to the Zaghawa royalty as "blacksmith kings with inconceivable arrogance".

The term "blacksmith" has been derogatory in Zaghawa culture, states Anne Haour, a professor of African Studies and Medieval Archaeology, and "if born a blacksmith one will always be a blacksmith". Non-blacksmith castes of Zaghawa neither eat nor associate with the blacksmith castes. The lowest strata has been the slaves. The social stratification and castes such as for the leatherworker strata within the Zaghawa people is similar to those found in nearby Fur people.

== Contemporary influence ==
While they are not very powerful in Sudan, they politically dominate Chad. The former president, Idriss Déby and several former prime ministers of Chad are Zaghawa, as well as many other members of the government. Thus the Chadian Zaghawa have been influential people in the regional politics. In contemporary wars in Chad, Libya and Sudan, the Zaghawa ethnic group has been deeply involved, particularly through strategic alliances with other ethnic groups such as the Fur people.

However, in Sudan, the Zaghawa are caught up in the Darfur crisis, and have suffered much loss from the troubles there. The Zaghawa of Sudan are among the peoples living in the refugee camps in Darfur and eastern Chad where the recruitment of child soldiers into rebel movements is an ongoing problem.

The Zaghawa have been among the tribes in Darfur who have been referred to as "African" even as other tribes that have fought with them have been called "Arab".

As a result of Tijani Muslim missionaries from West Africa traveling through their area to make the Hajj, the Zaghawa leadership converted to Islam. In the 1940s, the Zaghawa began to turn to Islam from their traditional religion en masse. In Darfur, the Zaghawa are well-known for their piety. Due to the fighting in the War in Darfur, where they are targeted by the Janjaweed Arab militias due to their ethnic heritage, 100,000 have become refugees across the border in Chad. A Zaghawa tribesman named Daoud Hari wrote a memoir about Darfur called The Translator and a Zaghawa woman named Halima Bashir co-authored a memoir with Damien Lewis called Tears of the Desert, which both spread knowledge about the atrocities in Darfur.

Among Sudan's ethnic minorities, Zaghawa Islamists were also one of the most active within the al-Bashir regime at its beginning, participating in security, police and the Popular Defense Forces. After the 1989 coup, Khalil Ibrahim, a Zaghawa from Tina, was placed at the head of the tanzim in Darfur. Other Zaghawas, such as Adam Tahir Hamdoun, Yusuf Libis, Sulieman Jammous or Khalil's brother, Gibril Ibrahim, would also play key roles in the new regime. However, after al-Turabi's break with al-Bashir and the crisis of '98, most of the Islamist Zaghawas defected from the NCP and became anti-regime activists, with many of them aligning themselves with the al-Turabi's Popular Congress Party, participating in the publication of The Black Book or leading the al-Fashir protests in September 2000.

== Notable people ==
- Minni Minnawi
- Idriss Déby
- Khalil Ibrahim
- Yaya Dillo Djérou
- Mahamat Déby
- Gibril Ibrahim
- Moussa Faki
- Timane Erdimi

== See also ==
- Kabka Sultanate
