= Mining industry of Sudan =

Economic sector

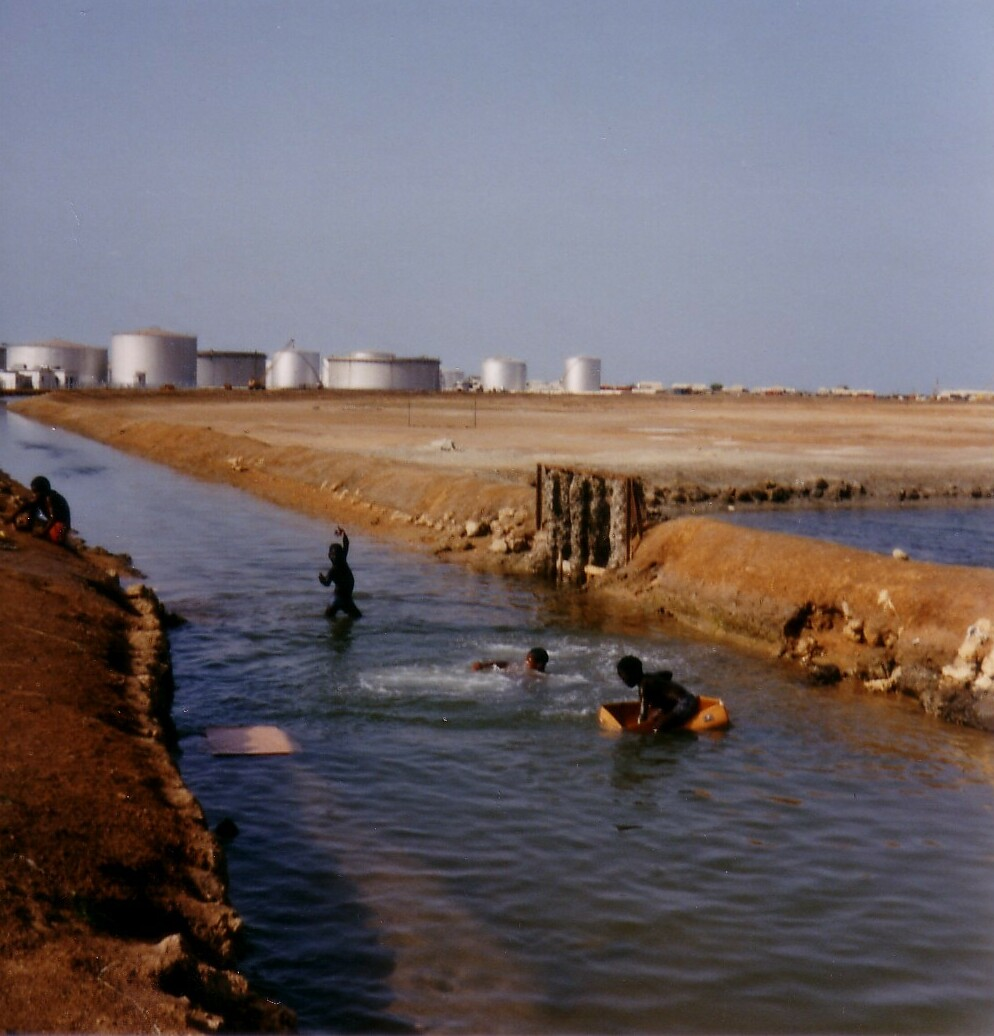
Oil refinery, Port Sudan

The mining industry of Sudan is mostly driven by extraction fuel minerals, including gold. Prior to becoming independent in 2011 as South Sudan, petroleum extraction in the autonomous region of Southern Sudan accounted for a substantial contribution to the country's economy. Following South Sudan's independence, growth in the gold mining industry saw substantial traction. By 2022, Sudan would emerge as the third-largest producer of gold in Africa.

In addition to gold, iron ore, and base metals are mined in the Hassai Gold Mine and elsewhere. Chromite is another important mineral extracted from the Ingessana Hills. Other minerals extracted are gypsum, salt, and cement. Phosphate is found in Mount Kuoun and Mount Lauro in eastern Nuba. Reserves of zinc, lead, aluminium, cobalt, nickel in the form of block sulfides, and uranium are also established. Large reserves of iron ore have been established.

== History ==
Ancient historical records indicate that gold and iron mining in the country existed under the kingdom of Meroë and also during the reign of the kingdom of Nubia, the Pharaonic era, during the Roman period. The name 'Neb' in the Nubian language means "gold" and is attributed to the Nuba region. It was also called the "country of metal" by the British.

The independence of South Sudan of 2011 meant that Sudan lost approximately two-thirds of its oil wells, which has been credited with driving increased investment in the gold mining sector. In the ten-year period ending in 2022, Sudan would become the third-largest producer of gold in the continent.

== Production and impact ==
Production from the mining sector accounts for about 4% of gross domestic product (GDP). Mineral extraction reported by the Government of Sudan include gold, chromium, gypsum, salt, and cement. In 2012, the production of crude petroleum dropped to about 37.7 million barrels (Mbbl) from a high of 106.2 Mbbl in 2011 and 168.7 Mbbl in 2010. Production of gypsum, feldspar, salt, gold, and cement have increased since 2012. Approximately 250,000 artisanal miners work in gold production.

In the open pit Hassai Gold Mine, which has been under operation since 1993, gold production from 18 open pits was to the extent of 2.3 million ounces (Moz). The established reserve at this mine in the Proterozoic-aged Ariab greenstone belt is 14.09 million tons.

== Legal framework ==
The Minerals Development Act of 2007 and its regulations are in force. The Investment Promotion Law of 1999 and its amendments define the benefits that are available to the private companies to invest in the mining sector; agreements drawn cover both the exploration and mining phases. In the first instance, an Exploration Prospecting License is issued. Following a successful exploration of specific mines, a mining license is awarded to the company, with due registration of the production company under the Sudanese Companies Act 1925.

== Commodities ==
Reserves of phosphate found in Mount Kuoun and Mount Lauro in eastern Nuba, has been assessed as 400,000 tons, including some amount of uranium U_{2}O_{3}.

Kaolin, a clay mineral consisting of potassium and Aluminium silicate, is found in some areas of Khartoum and in the south of the River Nile State. Granite is extracted from the southern Wadi Halfa.

Iron ore reserves lie in the Red Sea Mountains, in Mount Abu Tolo in South Kordofan, and in West Darfur and Baljrawih in River Nile State. The reserves found in the Baljrawih area and Wadi Halfa area have been assessed at 2 billion tons.

Chromium deposits have been established in the Inqasna Mountains, the Nuba Mountains, and the Red Sea Mountains. The estimated reserves of crude chrome is 1 million tons. Chrome has been extracted since the 1970s. Chromite is extracted from the Ingessana Hills, which has an estimated reserve of 1 million tons; production here in the recent years has been about 10,000 tons per year. Manganese is found in the Red Sea Mountains and the Albeodh desert along the River Nile, and in areas around Khartoum State.

Base metals like zinc, lead, aluminium, cobalt, and nickel found in the form of block sulfides are volcanic in nature. Zinc ore is assessed as 60 million tons in the Red Sea area. Lead is found in the Kutum area of North Darfur, aluminium in Darfur, cobalt in the Red Sea, and nickel in the Red Sea, Blue Nile, and South Kordofan.

Uranium and rare earth elements have been found in Darfur pit copper, South and West Kurdufan, Red Sea, and Butana.

Graphite has been located in the Blue Nile. Asbestos ore reserves in Inqasna have been assessed at 6,650 million tons, and asbestos fibers in the Gouge Zone Bees Reserve have the potential of 53,500 million tons, of which some has been mined.

Tungsten reserves were assessed by the Bureau de Recherches Géologiques et Minières in 1981 in the Mount Ayub Ali area. The estimate of crude oil reserves was approximately 531,000 tons. Gypsum has been identified in the Beraat region and in Mount Sagomhas, which has an estimated reserve of 34 million tons in the sea and 124 million tons at a depth of 50 metres (160 ft).

=== Gold ===
Gold is found in three types of geological formations: the Parentheses Gossan formation in the Eriab region of the eastern Nuba Mountains; in quartz-vein formations in the North Kurdufan, Obaidiya, and the Blue Nile region; and alluvial gold along the Nile River and its tributaries, particularly in the Blue Nile and Northern Sudan.

Sudan is the third largest producer of gold in Africa. The Sudan Gold Refinery Company, with full ownership rights vested with the Central Bank of Sudan, the Ministry of Minerals, and the Ministry of Finance and Natural Economy, produces gold in the range of 270 to 360 tons; silver alloy and silver granules are also byproducts. Gold, iron ore and base metals are mined in the Hassai Gold Mine, located 50 kilometres (31 mi) to the northeast of Khartoum. This is the only gold mine in the country with a production capacity of 90,000 oz/year. As of 2019, the Central Bank of Sudan reported official production of 100 metric tons of gold bullion, with 21.7 tons going to export.

In September 2012, Sudanese President Omar al-Bashir opened the country's first gold refinery. It was speculated to be one of the largest such constructions in Africa. The refinery will produce more than 328 tonnes of gold annually. Economic analysts say that the refinery is part of government's strategy to make up for lost oil revenue after the South Sudan split of 2011. The refinery will also be able to process silver and its opening should reduce the amount of gold and silver smuggled to other markets. According to Reuters, Sudan hoped to double its gold revenues in 2012 to $3 billion. In August 2012, the Sudanese Ministry of Finance said that the export of gold ore from Sudan would be prohibited once the refinery was opened.

Finance Minister Gibril Ibrahim estimated in 2021 that only 20% of Sudan's gold output went through official channels. Information from the Central Bank indicated that 32.7 tons of gold was unaccounted for in 2021.

Following a meeting between Sudanese President Omar al-Bashir and Russian leader Vladimir Putin in 2017, the Russian-Sudanese corporation Meroe Gold was formed. An anti-corruption committee formed after the Sudanese Revolution alleged in September 2021 that members of the Sudanese military had colluded with a Russian gold smuggling operation through the front company al-Solag. The anti-corruption committee was disbanded following the Sudanese military coup d'état in October 2021. Reports in 2022 linked Meroe Gold to the Wagner Group, a Russian paramilitary organisation and found that gold was being smuggled by land to the Central African Republic and by air via at least 16 known Russian flights, including one carrying about a ton of gold with a manifest stating it was hauling cookies.

== Outlook ==
Many gold extraction projects are expected to move to the production stage. However, constraints identified for such development are the large royalty fees, carriage costs, and governmental economic restrictions. Chromite mining is subject to demand in the world stainless steel sector.
