= Ibrahim Al-Badawi =

Sudanese politician and economist (born 1954)

Minister of Finance
- In office September 2019 – July 2020
- Preceded by: Magdi Hassan Yassin
- Succeeded by: Hiba Mohamed Ali Ahmed

Personal details
- Born: 1 January 1954 (age 72)
- Occupation: Politician, economist

Ibrahim Al-Badawi (born 1 January 1954) is a Sudanese politician and economist.

== Career ==
Al-Badawi was the minister of finance from September 2019 to July 2020. He is also the Founder and managing director of the Development Studies and Research Forum, Dubai.
