= National Consensus Forces =

Sudanese political alliance

National Consensus Forces تحالف قوى الإجماع الوطني
- Founder: Farouk Abu Issa
- Founded: April 2010
- Preceded by: National Democratic Alliance
- Headquarters: Khartoum
- Ideology: Antimilitarism; Secularism; Factions: Communism; Social democracy Nasserism; Ba'athism; Neo-Ba'athism; Sudanese nationalism Islamic democracy Islamism
- Political position: Big tent
- National affiliation: Forces of Freedom and Change

The National Consensus Forces (NCF, Ij’maa) is a coalition of political parties in Sudan that opposed the rule of the National Congress Party, and was initially formed to stand against the NCP in the 2010 Sudanese elections. Farouk Abu Issa served as chairman from 2005 until his death in 2020.

It is part of the FFC (Forces for Freedom and Change), a wide coalition, which sought to overthrow Omar al-Bashir and to negotiate the democratic transition with the military after he was deposed.

In a recent statement, the coalition called for the end of bombing campaigns against civilians in the Darfur, Blue Nile, and South Kordofan states, organized by pro-government forces. They also called on the UN and the African Union to protect civilians and internally displaced persons in the area.

== Policies ==
The Popular Congress Party, the National Umma Party, and the Sudanese Communist Party later signed the Democratic Alternative Charter (DAC) on 4 July 2012, committing themselves to overthrowing the NCP through various peaceful political and popular means and establishing a civil and democratic state. The DAC was signed by 19 opposition parties. The NCF later outlined their plan for a transitional government to lead Sudan in the post-NCP phase. The NCF's plan involves the establishment of a parliament, a presidential council of six members representing six regions after restructuring the current federal system and an executive government of 20 ministers.

Internal division, over strategy and leadership, led to the creation in 2018 of an opposing coalition umbrella called the Sudan Call. The NCF was at first allied to the Sudan Call, but it later on accused them of aiming towards reconciliation with the government, while their ultimate goal was "regime change". The NCF even purged those suspected of thinking of this "soft-landing" with the government within its own ranks. It was then reduced to the Communist Party, as well as Baathist and Nasserite elements.

== Member parties ==
=== Main parties ===
Members
Name	Ideology	Leader
Sudanese Communist Party	Communism; Marxism-Leninism	Muhammad Mukhtar Al-Khatib
Ba'ath Party – Region of Sudan	Ba'athism; Saddamism	Ali Elraih El Sanhoory
Ba'ath Party – Organization of Sudan	Neo-Ba'athism	Al-Tijani Mustafa Yassin
Popular Congress Party	Sudanese nationalism Islamism	Ibrahim El Sanousi
Sudanese Ba'ath Party	Ba'athism	Mohamed Ali Jadin
National Umma Party	Sudanese nationalism Islamic democracy	Fadlallah Baramah Nasser
Nasserist Democratic Unionist Party	Nasserism	Gamal Abdunnasir Idris
Unified Democratic Unionist Party	N/A	Jala'a Ismail Al-azhari
New Forces Democratic Movement	N/A	Halal Abdulhaleem
Sudanese Congress Party	Social democracy	Khalid Omar Yousif

== See also ==
- National Democratic Alliance – a previous opposition alliance in Sudan
