= James Mayuol Thor =

South Sudanese politician

James Mayuol Thor is a South Sudanese politician. He was one of six SPLM candidates elected on the party list to the Jonglei State Legislative Assembly in the 2010 election.
