= Mohamed al-Amin Khalifa =

Sudanese military officer and politician (1949–2019)

Khalifa in the 1990s

Mohamed al-Amin Khalifa (Arabic: محمد الأمين خليفة; 1 January 1949 – 20 October 2019) was a Sudanese military officer and politician.

Khalifa was born in El Nuhud, Western State (now North Kordofan State). He was educated at the Sudanese Military Academy. He also had a degree from the University of Cairo, and a PhD in political science from the University of Gezira in 2008.

Khalifa was a member of the Revolutionary Command Council in 1989. He was the chairman of the National Transitional Council from 1992 to 1996. Then he was appointed as minister of cabinet affairs.

In 1999, Hassan al-Turabi defected from the ruling National Congress Party (NCP) due to disagreements with President Omar al-Bashir. Khalifa joined al-Turabi's Popular Congress Party. He was imprisoned in 2001.

Khalifa died on 20 October 2019 in Bonn, Germany, shortly after undegoing heart surgery.
