= 2010 Western Equatoria gubernatorial election =

Gubernatorial election in South Sudan

The Western Equatoria gubernatorial election took place in April 2010, alongside elections for the Governorships of Sudan's other states as part of the wider Sudanese general election, to elect the Governor of Western Equatoria. In a rare upset, incumbent SPLM Governor Jemma Nunu Kumba was defeated by the Independent candidate Col. Bangasi Joseph Bakosoro.

== Results ==
Western Equatoria gubernatorial election, 2010
Party	Candidate	Votes	%	±%
Independent	Bangasi Joseph Bakosoro	78,563	45.99	
SPLM	Jemma Nunu Kumba	73,057	42.76	
UDSF	Abbas Bullen Ajalla Bambey	8,815	5.16	
Independent	Natale Ukele Alex Kimbo	5,510	3.23	
National Congress	Awad Kisanga Said Ahmed	4,893	2.86	
Total votes		170,838	100.0	
Majority		5,506	3.23	
Turnout				
