= Mustafa Youssef =

Sudanese politician and economist

Mustafa Youssef is a Sudanese politician and economist.

== Career ==
Yousseff was the minister of finance between February and March 2019, when he was replaced by Magdi Hassan Yassin.
