= Kuraan people =

Kuraan also known as Goraan is an ethnic minority of North Darfur, Sudan. Kuraan are a tribe which is near the Zaghawa, they live near Chad which they came to from Nubia. Kuraan are known for their own type of sword named Jugadi and their tradition of throwing knives. This minority is mainly Muslim. They speak Arabic.
