= Khalil Ibrahim =

Sudanese insurgent leader; founder of JEM (1957–2011)

Ibrahim Khalil
- إبراهيم خليل

Leader of the Justice and Equality Movement
- In office 2000 – 10 December 1993
- Succeeded by: Gibril Ibrahim

Advisor to the Governor of Central Equatoria
- In office 1998 – August 1998

Blue Nile State Minister for Social Affairs
- In office 1997–1998

Darfur State Minister for Education
- In office 1991–1994

Personal details
- Born: 1957 Darfur, Republic of Sudan
- Died: December 24, 2011 (aged 53–54) North Kurdufan, Sudan
- Party: Justice and Equality Movement
- Other political affiliations: Popular Congress (1999–2000); National Islamic Front (1989–1999)
- Relatives: Gibril (brother)
- Education: Maastricht University

Military service
- Allegiance: (Sudan) Sudanese Government (1992); Justice and Equality Movement (2000–2011)
- Years of service: 1992, 2000–2011
- Battles/wars: Second Sudanese Civil War; War in Darfur; 2008 Omdurman attack Sudanese conflict in South Kordofan and Blue Nile

Ibrahim Khalil (Arabic: إبراهيم خليل; 1957 – 22 or 24 December 2011) was a Sudanese insurgent leader who was the founder of the Justice and Equality Movement (JEM) which he led until his death. In the 1990s Ibrahim served in several state governments of Sudan.

== Early life ==
Ibrahim was born in Sudan in 1957. Ibrahim was from the Koba branch of the Zaghawa ethnic group, which is located mainly in Sudan, with a minority on the Chad side of the border. He was an enthusiastic supporter of the National Islamic Front (NIF) seizure of power under the direction of Islamist Hassan al-Turabi in 1989.

== Political career ==
Ibrahim served as the state minister for education in Darfur between 1991 and 1994 in al-Fashir, North Darfur. A physician, Ibrahim spent four months in 1992 to fight Sudan People's Armed Forces. By Ibrahim's own account, he was disaffected with the Islamist movement by 2000 after seeing the economic neglect of the NIF, as well as its support to armed militias. At this time, he became part of a covert cell of Islamists who were seeking to change the NIF from inside. Ibrahim went on to serve as the state minister for social affairs in Blue Nile in 1997 before a post as adviser to the governor of Southern Sudan in Juba in 1998. However, others noted that he never received a national level appointment. Ibrahim's colleague in JEM, Ahmad Tugod, stated, "Khalil is not a first or even second class political leader. [...] He struggled all of his life to get a post in Khartoum."

He quit the post in August 1998, several months before the end of his appointment, and formed an NGO called "Fighting Poverty". In December 1999, when al-Bashir sidelined al-Turabi with the help of Ali Osman Taha, Ibrahim was in the Netherlands, studying for a master's degree in public health at Universiteit Maastricht. In the meantime, the structure of covert cells that Ibrahim had helped set up in 1994 had spread to Khartoum. The dissidents, dubbing themselves "The Seekers of Truth and Justice" published the Black Book in 2000, claiming Riverine Arabs dominated political power and resources.

In 2001, Ibrahim was one of twenty people sent out of the country by the dissidents to go public. In August 2001, Ibrahim published a press release from the Netherlands, in which he announced the formation of the Justice and Equality Movement. The JEM has a relatively small ethnic base of support, limited to the Kobe Zaghawa, including many kinsmen from across the Chadian border.

== Darfur conflict ==
On 5 March 2002, Ibrahim claimed credit for initiating a government revolt. This apparent claim of the landmark attack on Golo, actually carried out by the Sudan Liberation Army (SLA), was mocked by the SLA and the JEM was forced to back away from their announcement. Regardless, the JEM and the anti-government SLA formed a loose alliance in prosecuting the Darfur conflict.

In May 2006, the JEM rejected the Abuja peace process, which was accepted by the faction of the SLA led by Minni Minnawi, but rejected by the smaller SLA factions. On 30 June 2006, Ibrahim, Khamis Abdalla, the leader of an SLM faction, Sharif Harir and Ahmed Ibrahim, co-leaders of the National Democratic Alliance (Sudan), founded the National Redemption Front rebel group in Asmara, Eritrea but which is based in Chad.

Ibrahim lived in exile in Libya from May 2010 to September 2011, when the Libyan civil war compelled him to flee across the Sahara and return to Darfur. The Sudanese government and diplomatic sources accused Ibrahim's group of rebels in Libya of fighting as mercenaries for Libyan strongman Muammar Gaddafi during the war, charges to which Ibrahim never responded, neither being proved.

== Death ==
Ibrahim died either on 22 December 2011 after an air strike by the Sudanese armed forces or on 24 December 2011, two days after being injured in fighting in North Kordofan, west of Wad Banda.
