= 2010 South Darfur gubernatorial election =

The South Darfur gubernatorial election took place on 11–15 April 2010, alongside the wider Sudanese general election, to elect the Governor of South Darfur.

== Results ==
South Darfur gubernatorial election, 2010
Party	Candidate	Votes	%	±%
National Congress	Abdul Hamid Musa Kasha Kebbour	301,767	56.65	
PCP	Haj Adam Youssef Abdo	128,552	24.13	
DUP		47,206	8.86	
NUP		23,499	4.41	
I Am Sudan Party		18,739	3.52	
SPLM		12,956	2.43	
Total votes		532,719	100	
Majority		173,215	32.52	
Turnout				
