= 2008 Omdurman attack =

2008 raid

Attack on Omdurman and Khartoum
- Part of the Darfur War
- Sudanese TV shows the aftermath of the rebel attack on Omdurman on May 10, 2008
Date	May 10–12, 2008
Location	Khartoum and Omdurman, Sudan
Result	Sudanese government victory

Belligerents
Justice and Equality Movement	Government of Sudan

Commanders and leaders
Khalil Ibrahim	Omar al-Bashir

Strength
1,200+ (government claim)	Unknown

Casualties and losses
45 killed or wounded (JEM claim); 90+ killed and scores captured (government claim)	106 killed (government claim)
- 30 civilians killed (government claim)

In May 2008, the Justice and Equality Movement (JEM), a Darfur ethnic minority rebel group, undertook a raid against the Sudanese government in the cities of Omdurman and Khartoum.

From the government's viewpoint, the attack only took place on May 10, 2008, while JEM has countered the government's account with reports of heavy fighting in parts of the Khartoum metropolitan area on May 11. More than 220 people were reported to be killed in the raid, including a Russian pilot, and scores were later sentenced to death.

It was the first time that the War in Darfur, previously confined to western Sudan, reached the country's capital. Overall, the war had claimed the lives of up to 300,000 people, with 2.5 million more made homeless since 2003 (the United States has labeled the conflict in Darfur as genocide, a charge the Sudanese government has rejected). Despite decades of warfare in Southern Sudan, Khartoum had not experienced any street fighting since 1976.

== The battle ==
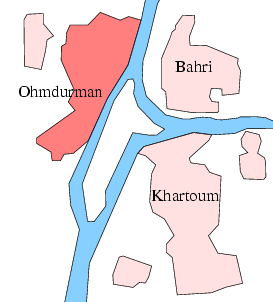

On May 10, 2008, Sudanese National Islamic Front (NIF) government troops and a large group of rebels from Darfur fought in the city of Omdurman, opposite of Khartoum. Witnesses reported heavy gunfire and artillery fire in the west of Sudan's capital, and Sudan People's Armed Forces helicopters and vehicles rushing through the streets towards Omdurman.

As the Justice and Equality Movement (JEM) rebels in a convoy of 130 all-terrain vehicles approached the capital, a Russian military pilot working as a military instructor for the Sudanese Air Force climbed into a MiG-29 fighter jet and attempted to strafe the column. The plane was shot down by a large-calibre machine gun and the pilot was killed as his parachute did not open after ejecting. Despite the efforts of the Sudanese and Russian governments to conceal the incident, news of his death was leaked by the independent Echo of Moscow radio station in Russia and the Sudanese newspaper Alwan, which was promptly closed down for having "disclosed sensitive military information harmful to the country’s security and its accomplishments".

JEM forces entered Omdurman, targeting the Arba'een military base and the Al-Aswat police station. Government troops backed up by tanks, artillery, and helicopter gunships were immediately deployed to Omdurman, and heavy fighting continued for several hours. The rebels then started to move towards the Al-Ingaz bridge to cross the White Nile into Khartoum in an apparent attempt to reach the Presidential Palace, while another JEM force headed towards the National Radio and Television building in Omdurman. Both attacks were repelled by government forces.

After recapturing the strategic military airbase at Wadi-Sayedna, Sudanese government soldiers stopped the rebel advance before the country's parliament, and by late afternoon Sudanese TV said that the rebels had been "completely repulsed" while showing live pictures of burnt vehicles and bodies on the street. Sudanese police said the alleged leader of the attackers, Mohamed Saleh Garbo, and his intelligence chief, Mohamed Nur Al-Deen, were both killed in the clash. The government declared an overnight curfew shortly after its announced cessation of hostilities at 14:00 GMT. The JEM, however, denied the government's claim of victory against the rebels, instead stating that fighting was still going on in Omdurman and Khartoum North.

According to a report by Human Rights Watch, sporadic fighting continued for the next 48 hours. Omdurman residents said there was more fighting on the morning of May 11. There were also reports of fighting on May 12 at markets in central Khartoum (west of the American Embassy), and on the other bank of the Blue Nile. Residents in Banat and Al-Muhandiseen areas reported shootings in the area, and an eyewitness said that the Sudanese security forces set a siege around one of the buildings said to be occupied by JEM fighters. On the same day, JEM leader Khalil Ibrahim spoke by telephone to the Associated Press claiming to still be within Omdurman with his fighters, and vowed to continue attacks in a long guerrilla war. The group identified their goal to overthrow Omar al-Bashir's military government.

On May 14, the Sudanese defense minister, Abdul Rahim Mohammed Hussein, said 93 of his soldiers and 13 policemen died in the battle, along with 30 civilians and more than 90 JEM rebels. He also said the rebels lost at least two-thirds of their vehicles, while the interior minister, Ibrahim Mahmoud, said the government forces destroyed more than 40 vehicles and seized about 17 more. The JEM also admitted defeat in the raid in which they said a third of all their fighters took part, but promised further attacks on the capital. The group's deputy chairman, Mahmoud Suleiman, said in a statement that it "might have lost the Khartoum battle and pulled out in dignity ... but it has not lost the war."

== Aftermath ==
Hassan al-Turabi and ten other members of the oppositionist Popular National Congress party (PNC), a splinter faction of the ruling National Congress, were arrested at dawn in their Khartoum homes because of their alleged links to the rebels. Turabi was released later that day, denying any such relationship between the PNC and JEM.

Ibrahim ruled out any ceasefire with Khartoum unless a political accord is signed, accused the international community of impotence in its response to the Darfur crisis, and hailed the position of the Sudanese Communist Party for not condemning the attack. The government said it learned lessons from the raid and will be better prepared next time. It also offered a US$125,000 bounty on Ibrahim, who has been allegedly wounded during fighting on May 10 in Omdurman.

By April 2009, the Sudanese government had sentenced 82 Justice and Equality Movement members, including the top rebel Abdul Aziz Ashur, Ibrahim's half-brother, to death by hanging for terrorism and illegal possession of weapons. As one batch of the sentences was handed down, the condemned men stood up and shouted, "Go, JEM, go!" and "Go, Khalil, go!" By November 2009, the number of these sentenced for death surpassed 100, including six JEM child soldiers; however, scores of other children accused of taking part in the raid were pardoned and freed by al-Bashir.

== Impact on Sudanese-Chadian relations ==
Sudan accused its neighbor Chad of providing safe haven and ammunition to the rebels ("basically Chadian forces"), and the Sudanese government announced that rebels were moving over the border from Chad to the Darfur region, which is the epicenter of the conflict between Darfuri rebels and pro-government Janjaweed militants; the rebels then moved over about 600 km (370 mi) of desert and scrub from Darfur to the Khartoum metropolitan area. Chad denied the allegations, but Sudan immediately cut off relations with Chad for the first time since a non-aggression pact was signed between the two countries' governments in mid-March.

== International reactions ==
- United Nations: United Nations Secretary-General Ban Ki-moon condemned "the use of armed force and military means by JEM for the achievement of political ends" and called for an immediate cessation of hostilities and renewed efforts towards peace in Darfur. He expressed concern about the effects that the attack would have on the UN's own efforts in the region.
- European Union: The European Union's High Representative for the Common Foreign and Security Policy, Javier Solana, condemned the attack on the Sudanese capital by the JEM, saying: "There can be no military solution to the crisis in Darfur, in particular, nor to the problems of Sudan, in general." He also urged the Sudanese government to exert in the coming days maximum restraint, in particular towards the civilian populations of the capital, as civilians are primary victims of violence in Darfur.
- United States: Deputy Press Secretary Gordon Johndroe stated from Crawford, Texas, that the U.S. government was very concerned about the raid and urged "that both sides cease hostilities, whether it is the rebel group or any response from the government. We want to see a calm and order restored."
- Norway: Minister of Foreign Affairs Jonas Gahr Støre condemned the rebel attack on Khartoum, saying, according to a press release, that "the fighting shows the need for reinforced efforts from the UN, AU, the international community and parties in the Darfur conflict to find a political solution to the conflict in Darfur. The conference emphasized the need for a united international effort to create peace in the entire Sudan. The situation in Sudan is now very serious. Only political dialogue can change this. Both the authorities in Sudan and rebel movements have to recognise that the continued military struggle is a dead-end." Earlier in the week, Norway was the host of the UN and World Bank donor conference for Sudan.

== See also ==
- Battle of N'Djamena (2006) and Battle of N'Djamena (2008): similar raids on the Chadian capital N'Djamena by the Chadian United Front for Democratic Change rebels allegedly supported by Sudan.
