= Ba'athist regime =

Ba'athist regime may refer to these Ba'athist governments:

- Ba'athist Iraq (1968–2003)
- Ba'athist Syria (1963–2024)
- Ba'athist Kuwait (1990)

== See also ==
- Ba'athist Revolution (disambiguation)
- Ba'ath Party (disambiguation)
