= Awad al-Jaz =

Sudanese politician

- عوض الجاز
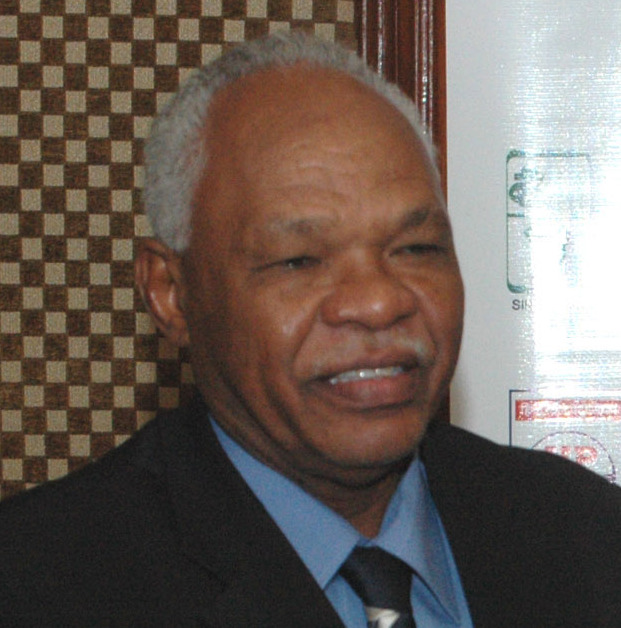
- Al-Jaz in 2007

Minister of Petroleum and Gas
- In office 27 December 2011 – 8 December 2013
- President: Omer al-Bashir

Minister of Industry
- In office 16 June 2010 – 27 December 2011
- President: Omer al-Bashir

Minister of Finance and Economy
- In office 13 February 2008 – 16 June 2010
- President: Omer al-Bashir
- Preceded by: Ali Mahmood Abdel-Rasool
- Succeeded by: Badr Al-Din Mahmoud Abbas

Minister of Energy and Mining
- In office 12 August 1995 – 13 February 2008
- President: Omer al-Bashir

Personal details
- Party: National Congress Party (1998–2019); National Islamic Front (until 1998)
- Education: University of Khartoum (1973)

Awad Ahmed al-Jaz (Arabic: عوض أحمد الجاز) is a Sudanese political figure, known for his influential roles within the government of former President Omar al-Bashir, who was ousted after the 2019 revolution and coup d'état. Al-Jaz is a longstanding National Congress Party (NCP) member, formerly the National Islamic Front.

== Biography ==
Al-Jaz held several key ministerial positions, including Minister of Energy and Mining from 1995 to 2008, where he fostered a strategic partnership with China, leading to Sudan's emergence as an oil-exporting nation. In February 2008, he transitioned to Minister of Finance and National Economy until May 2010, a move perceived as a reward for his contributions to the petroleum industry. Al-Jaz also served as a presidential assistant (2016 – 2019) overseeing Sudan's relations with China and Turkey, countries that became significant investors in Sudan's infrastructure and energy sectors.

In recognition of his service, al-Jaz was awarded the "Order of the Righteous Son of Sudan," one of the country's highest honours.

Following the ousting of President al-Bashir in April 2019, al-Jaz was arrested and faced multiple charges, including allegations of embezzlement related to a $150 million project for the Mashkur sugar factory in White Nile State. However, in June 2022, a Sudanese court acquitted him of these charges.

In the wake of the 2023 conflict between the Sudanese Armed Forces (SAF) and the Rapid Support Forces (RSF), reports emerged that al-Jaz, along with other former regime officials, escaped from Kobar Prison in Khartoum and relocated to Kassala. There, he called on political parties to support the army, which drew criticism from opposition figures who accused them of attempting to leverage the military for a political comeback.
