= Ba'athist Revolution =

Ba'athist Revolution may refer to these movements associated with Ba'athism:

- Ramadan Revolution, 1963 Ba'athist military coup in Iraq
- 1963 Syrian coup d'état, lead to the formation of Ba'athist Syria (1963–2024)
- 1966 Syrian coup d'état, 21–23 February overthrow of government by Salah Jadid's Arab Socialist Ba'ath Party – Syria Region
- 17 July Revolution (1968), coup which lead to the formation of Ba'athist Iraq (1968–2003)
- Corrective Movement (Syria), 1970 coup by Hafez al-Assad forming the Assad regime in Ba'athist Syria (1970–2024)

== See also ==
- Ba'ath Party (disambiguation)
- Ba'athist regime (disambiguation)
