= Popular Arab and Islamic Congress =

1991–1995 Sudanese pan-Islamic conference

Called together in Sudan by Hassan al-Turabi, the 1991 Popular Arab and Islamic Congress Conference sought to unify Mujahideen and other Islamic elements in the wake of the Soviet withdrawal from Afghanistan and the Iraqi defeat in the Gulf War. It sought to provide an alternative to the Saudi-dominated Organization of the Islamic Conference, although it did not have its financial means.

Held from April 25–28, it brought together disparate sections of the Muslim world in an attempt at Pan-Arabism and Pan-Islamic union. It was estimated to have brought together 500 people, from 45 nations. The congress met again in December 1993 and had a third meeting in March–April 1995.

It has been suggested that al-Turabi hoped to "crystallize discontent in the Arab world by bringing together under a single banner, hardline Islamic militants and nationalists". Critics suggested the congress also had domestic purposes for al-Turabi and his regime, particularly the "strengthening" of "his hold" on Sudan by posing as a leader of "the progressive Muslim masses", and the regime's "masking" its "narrow origins" and "lack of mass support".

== In attendance ==
- Hassan al-Turabi, Secretary-General of the Conference
- Ibrahim al-Sanoussi, Deputy Secretary-General
- Osama bin Laden
- Ayman al-Zawahiri of Egyptian Islamic Jihad
- Ali Mahdi of Somalia
- Sa'ad al-Tikriti, son of Iraqi Mukhabarat director Sabawi Ibrahim al-Tikriti
- Abdallah Fadil, Iraqi minister of religious endowments
- Abdul-Latif Arabiyat, Speaker of the House of Representatives of Jordan
- Yasser Arafat, leader of the PLO
- Mounir Shafiq, General Director of the PLO Planning Center.
- Nayef Hawatmeh, leader of the DFLP
- George Habash, leader of the PFLP
- Hamas members Khaled Mashal, Ibrahim Ghousha and Munir Said
- Fathi Shaqaqi, founder of Palestinian Islamic Jihad
- Jabbar Amar, member of Palestinian Islamic Jihad
- Imad Mughniyah of Hezbollah
- Rached Ghannouchi, founder of al-Nahda of Tunisia
- Abdul Majeed al-Zindani, founder of Yemen's Al-Islah party
- Mohammed Jamal Khalifa, founder of the Philippine branch of Benevolence International, brother-in-law to Osama bin Laden, representing Abu Sayyaf
- Gulbuddin Hekmatyar, leader of Hezb-i-Islami of Afghanistan
- Abdul Rasul Sayyaf, leader of the Ittehad-i-Islami of Afghanistan
- Abbassi Madani, founder of the Islamic Salvation Front of Algeria
- Ibrahim Shukri, Ma'mun al-Hudaybi, and Mustafa Mashhur of the Muslim Brotherhood in Egypt
- Mohammed Abdul Rahman al-Khalifa, leader of the Jordanian Muslim Brotherhood
- Adnan Saad al-Din, leader of a faction of the Syrian Muslim Brotherhood
- Mubarak Ali Gilani, founder of Jamaat ul-Fuqra, named as a delegate from Kashmiri Hizb al-Mujahideen
- Muhammad Ahmad Al-Sharif, leader of the World Islamic Call Society of Libya
- Qazi Hussain Ahmad, leader of Jama'at-e Islami
- Daud Musa Pidcock, founder of the Islamic Party of Britain
- Abdel Bari Atwan, publisher of Al-Quds Al-Arabi
- Carlos the Jackal
- Abu Nidal
- Geydar Dzhemal
- Commanders of Al-Gama'a al-Islamiyya
- Members of the Iranian Revolutionary Guard
- Members of the Iranian MOIS
- Members of Afghan Jamiat-e Islami
- Members of Pakistani Jama'at-e Islami
- Members of Eritrean Islamic Jihad
- Members of the Oromo Liberation Front
- Members of the Lebanese Muslim Brotherhood
- Delegates from the Iraqi Trade Union
- Delegates from the Libyan Arab Jamahiriya

== See also ==
- Al-Qaeda
- Arab League
- Foreign relations of Sudan
- Muslim Brotherhood
- National Islamic Front
