= Taysir El Nourani =

Sudanese minister of social welfare

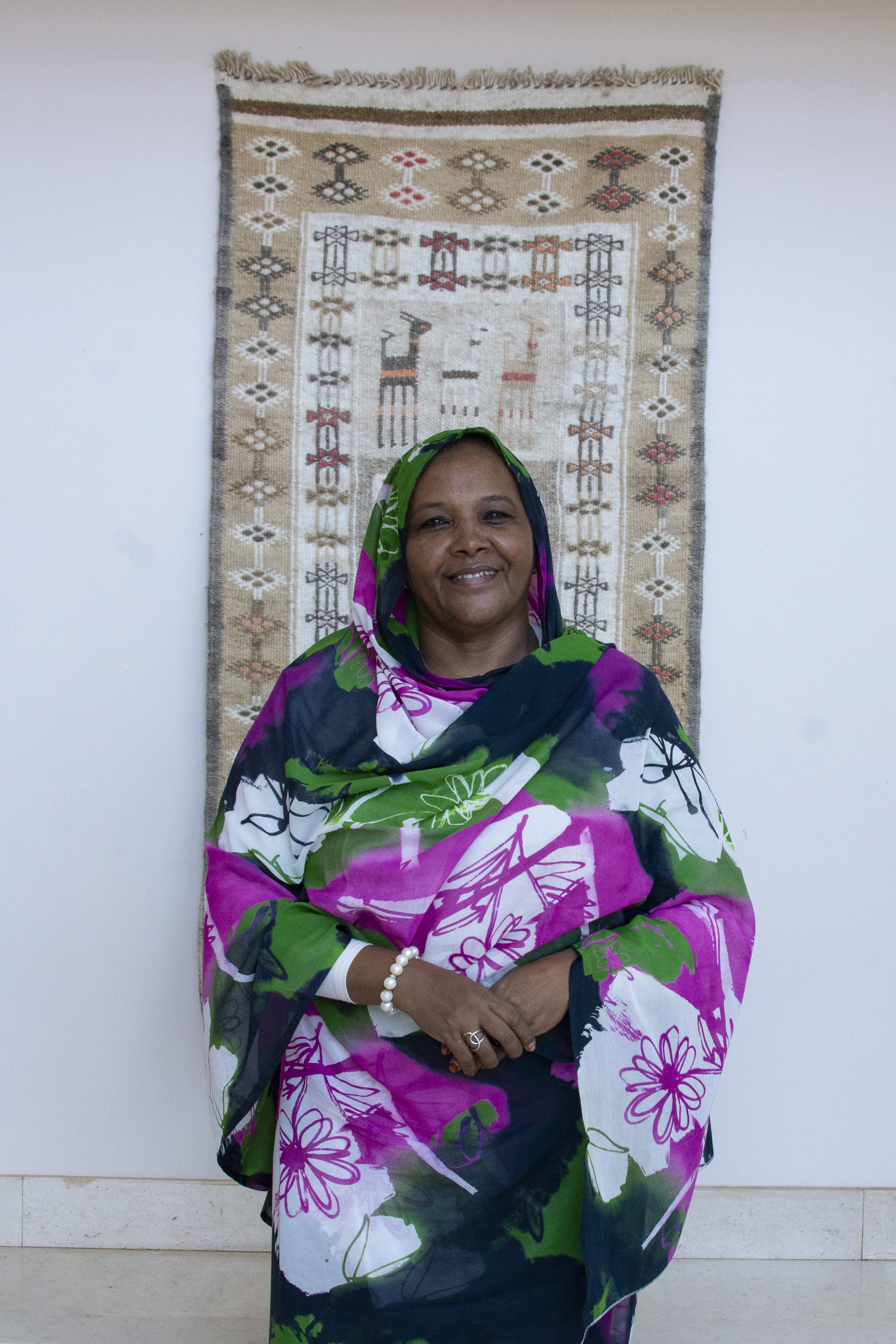

politician
- Minister: Minister of Labour and Administrative Reform in the transitional government 2019

Personal details
- Born: 28 April 1965 (age 60)
- Education: Sudan University of Science and Technology; Neelain University; Ahfad University for Women Sudan.

Taysir El Nourani is the Minister of Labour and Administrative Reform of Sudan. El Nourani is a member of the Sudanese Ba'ath Party. She began as minister on 9 February 2021.
