= Mubarak al-Fadil =

Sudanese politician

Mubarak al-Fadil led the Umma Reform and Renewal Party, an opposition political party in Sudan, until his arrest in 2007 for allegedly plotting to overthrow the Sudanese government.
