= 2010 Unity State gubernatorial election =

Elections in Sudan 2010

The Unity State gubernatorial election took place on 11–15 April 2010, alongside the wider Sudanese general election, to elect the Governor of Unity State. Incumbent Governor Taban Deng Gai was re-elected, defeating 6 other candidates, including Angelina Teny, who had resigned from the SPLM in order to contest the election.

Following the election the defeated candidates issued a joint statement denouncing the results, alleging the election had involved severe vote-rigging, and called for a review by the National Elections Commission. Angelina Teny said she would not accept or recognize the results. Angelina Teny detailed many irregularities, including ejection of observers, missing ballot boxes, vote counts in excess of the number of registered voters and so on. Her campaign leader was arrested when he and members of his team tried to enter the State High Elections Committee's office. Police shot dead two people and four others were injured when police opened fire on a crowd of protesters in the state capital, Bentiu. Angelina Teny called on her supporters to be calm and avoid violence, which has been endemic in Unity State, the main oil-producing area in South Sudan.

== Results ==
Unity State gubernatorial election, 2010
Party	Candidate	Votes	%	±%
SPLM	Taban Deng Gai	137,662	61.69	
Independent	Angelina Teny	63,561	28.48	
National Congress		9,429	4.23	
Independent		3,718		
National Democratic Front		3,295		
Democratic Forum for Southern Sudan		3,262		
Sudan People's Liberation Movement - Democratic Change		2,230		
Total votes		223,157	100	
Majority		74,101	33.21	
Turnout		223,157		
