= Abdallah Deng Nhial =

South Sudanese politician (born c. 1954)

- Born: 1954 (age 71–72)
- Education: al-Azhar University
- Occupations: Politician and Scholar
- Known for: Serving in both Sudanese and South Sudanese governments

Abdallah Deng Nhial (born c. 1954) is a South Sudanese politician and scholar. He has served in both Sudanese and South Sudanese governments in different positions.

== Background ==
Deng is a noted Islamic scholar hailing from Southern Sudan. He hails from a Dinka family, and is a relative of John Garang. An Arabic language teacher, Deng graduated from al-Azhar University in Cairo.

== National Islamic Front period ==
He served as Minister of Religious Affairs in the Sudanese government, but in a 1993 cabinet reshuffle he was moved to the position of Minister of Peace and Reconstruction (with the nominal task to rebuild Southern Sudan). As part of his new ministerial responsibilities, he also overtook the role of Ali al-Hajj Mohammed in representing the Sudanese government in negotiations with the Sudan People's Liberation Army. In 1994 he was appointed as the governor of the While Nile state. He also served as parliamentary whip and Minister of Youth and Sports. When the National Congress Party split in 1999/2000, Deng sided with Hassan al-Turabi.

== Campaign for the presidency ==
Deng was the candidate of the Popular Congress Party in the 2010 Sudanese presidential election. He was the deputy party chief at the time. His candidature was supported by 26,000 collected signatures. Deng was the sole Southerner in the fray in amongst the presidential candidates. In his campaign vowed to reduce poverty by fighting corruption and improving health, sanitation and education services. He expressed hope that through his candidature he would be able to convince Southerners to vote against separation in the upcoming referendum. Moreover, he stated that his party did not wish to enforce Islamic laws in Southern Sudan.

At the time of the elections the Egyptian newspaper al-Ahram wrote that Deng was "... a seasoned politician who is relatively young and has an enormous political following among both southerners and northerners. He is renowned for being a devout Muslim, albeit a moderate one and a man who is widely seen as a pragmatic and a democrat in political circles." Commenting on Deng's candidature, the party leader al-Turabi stated that the Popular Congress Party wished to show that it was open to all Sudanese regardless of race or ethnicity. The presidential candidate of the Sudan People's Liberation Movement, Yasir Arman, welcomed the nomination of Adballah, saying that the nomination broke the stereotype of Northerners vs. Southerners. Deng obtained 396,139 votes (3.9% of the national vote). Following the election Adballah alleged that the governing party had rigged the polls.

| State | Votes | % |
|---|---|---|
| Khartoum | 44,128 | 3.25% |
| Northern | 1,896 | 0.86% |
| River Nile | 3,149 | 0.90% |
| Red Sea | 4,825 | 1.11% |
| Kassala | 7,967 | 1.22% |
| Gedaref | 1,096 | 0.34% |
| Gezira | 12,476 | 1.10% |
| Sennar | 7,392 | 2.05% |
| White Nile | 6,350 | 1.57% |
| North Kordufan | 16,476 | 3.02% |
| North Darfur | 36,742 | 11.52% |
| South Darfur | 96,039 | 18.80% |
| West Darfur | 14,754 | 6.21% |
| Blue Nile | 8,108 | 3.23% |
| South Kordufan | 16,908 | 4.56% |
| Upper Nile | 13,397 | 5.80% |
| Jonglei | 8,708 | 4.46% |
| Unity | 11,584 | 5.69% |
| Central Equatoria | 17,797 | 7.39% |
| East Equatoria | 7,785 | 1.94% |
| West Equatoria | 8,963 | 5.63% |
| Lakes | 15,212 | 6.71% |
| Warrap | 3,063 | 0.60% |
| Western Bahr el Ghazal | 12,612 | 8.28% |
| Northern Bahr el Ghazal | 8,090 | 3.23% |
| Out of country | 758 | 1.11% |

== South Sudanese minister ==
In July 2013, Deng was appointed Minister of Electricity, Dams, Irrigation and Water Resources in the South Sudanese government. A few days later he was appointed Minister of Environment in yet another reshuffle. President Salva Kiir dismissed him from his post on November 26, 2013. Deng had been involved in a physical fight with a Member of Parliament the week before.
