= Kabka Sultanate =

The Kabka Sultanate, also called the Sultanate of Kabka and the Kabka Sultanate of Tundubay, is a remote Zaghawa-populated country subdivision on the Sudanese frontier within Chad. It was created by Chadian President Idriss Deby in order to appease Orange Rind Zaghawa nationalism and national pride since 1881.
