= Islamic Socialist Party =

- Founded: 1949
- Ideology: Arab nationalism Arab socialism Islamic socialism Arab-Islamic nationalism Pan-Arabism; Anti-capitalism; Anti-imperialism

The Islamic Socialist Party (Arabic: الحزب الإسلامي الاشتراكي) is a Sudanese political party. It re-formed in 1964 under this name following a split in the Islamic Liberation Front (حركة التحرير الاسلامي), originally founded in 1949.

== History ==
The Islamic Liberation Front was founded in March 1949 by Mirghani Al-Nasri. The party spread amongst University of Khartoum and secondary school students. It was a revivalist Islamic movement with a tendency of locality and nationality. In 1951, the front's candidates won the elections to the leadership of the University of Khartoum Student Union (KUSU), as well as student unions at some secondary schools.

Following the 1953 agreement between Sudanese political parties for self-determination in Cairo, the front's name was changed to Gama'a Islamyia. The new organization published its constitution and manifesto expounding the main principles of the former Islamic Liberation Movement, which were anti-imperialist, anti-capitalist and socialist. The manifesto was titled "Al-Gama'a Al-Islamya Daw'a wa Minhag" (The Gama'a Islamyia: A call and a program). The movement directed its efforts towards the trade unions of workers, farmers, students and intellectuals in Sudan.

In 1956, after the tripartite invasion of Egypt by Britain, France and Israel, which led to wide Arab support for Egyptian President Gamal Abdel Nasser, the group developed an emphasis on Pan-Arabism and liberation.

After the Islamic Charter Front split from the group as a separate party under Hassan Al-Turabi in 1964, Al-Nasri co-founded the Islamic Socialist Party with Babikir Karrar, another leader in the movement.
