= 2010 West Darfur gubernatorial election =

The West Darfur gubernatorial election took place on 11–15 April 2010, alongside the wider Sudanese general election, to elect the Governor of West Darfur.

The race was won by the National Congress candidate; Jaafar Abdel Hakam. Hakam took over from Abu El Gasim El Haj; a member of the SLM/A faction of Minni Minnawi, who had taken over the Governorship in March 2007 as part of the terms of the 2006 Darfur Peace Agreement. Haj chose not to contest the election.

== Results ==
West Darfur gubernatorial election, 2010
Party	Candidate	Votes	%	±%
National Congress	Jaafar Abdel Hakam	147,510		
DUP		60,223		
NUP		8,678		
Independent		8,568		
SPLM		6,882		
Sudan People's Liberation Movement - Democratic Change		6,803		
Total votes		238,664	100.00	
Majority		87,287	36.57	
Turnout				
