= Hiba Mohamed Ali Ahmed =

Sudanese politician and economist

Hiba Mohamed Ali Ahmed is a Sudanese politician and economist.

== Career ==
Ahmed was the minister of finance between July 2020 and February 2021. She was the first female Minister of Finance for Sudan.
