= Ministry of Finance (Sudan) =

Government ministry of Sudan

Republic of the Sudan Ministry of Finance and Economic Planning

Agency overview
- Jurisdiction: Government of Sudan
- Headquarters: Khartoum (Sudan)
- Agency executive: Gibril Ibrahim, Minister
- Website: Official website

The Ministry of Finance and Economic Planning is the Sudanese government ministry which oversees the public finances of Sudan.

== Ministers ==
This is a list of ministers of finance of Sudan:

- Hammad Tawfiq Ahmed, November 1955 - February 1956
- Ibrahim Ahmed, February 1956 - November 1958
- Abdul Majid Ahmed, November 1958 - November 1963
- Mamoun Mohamed Behery, November 1963 - October 1964
- Mubarak Zarrouk, October 1964 - April 1965
- Ibrahim Al-Mufti, May 1965 - July 1965
- Sharif Hussain Al-Hindi, July 1965 - July 1966
- Hamza Mirghani, August 1966 - May 1967
- Sharif Hussain Al-Hindi, May 1967 - May 1969
- Mansour Mahjoub, May 1969 - July 1970
- Mohamed Abdel Halim Omar, July 1970 - April 1972
- Musa Al-Hassan Al-Hassan, April 1972 - October 1972
- Ibrahim Alyas, October 1972 - May 1973
- Ibrahim Menem Mansour, May 1973 - January 1975
- Mamoun Mohamed Behery, February 1976 - February 1977
- Al-Sharif Al-Khatim, February 1977 - September 1977
- Othman Hashem Abdel Salam, March 1978 - August 1979
- Badreddine Suleiman, August 1979 - November 1981
- Ibrahim Menem Mansour, November 1981 - December 1984
- Abdel-Rahman Abdel-Wahab, December 1984 - April 1985
- Awad Abdul Majeed, April 1985 - January 1986
- Ahmed Tayfour, January 1986 - April 1986
- Bashir Omar Fadlallah, May 1986 - January 1988
- Omar Nour Al-Dayim, May 1988 - June 1989
- Sayed Ali Ahmed Zaki, July 1989 - April 1990
- Abdul Rahim Mahmoud Hamdy, April 1990 - October 1993
- Abdullah Hassan Ahmed, October 1993 - April 1996
- Abdul Wahab Othman, April 1996 - January 2000
- Mohamed Khair Al-Zubair, January 2000 - February 2001
- Abdul Rahim Mahmoud Hamdy, February 2001 - May 2002
- Zubair Ahmed Al-Hassan, June 2002 - February 2008
- Awad Ahmed Al-Jazz, February 2008 - May 2010
- Ali Mahmood Abdel-Rasool, June 2010 - June 2013 - ?
- Badr Al-Din Mahmoud Abbas, ? - December 2013 - May 2017
- Mohamed Osman Al-Rikabi, May 2017 - September 2018
- Mutaz Musa, September 2018 - February 2019
- Mustafa Youssef, February 2019 - March 2019
- Magdi Hassan Yassin, March 2019 - September 2019
- Ibrahim Al-Badawi, September 2019 - July 2020
- Hiba Mohamed Ali Ahmed, July 2020 - February 2021
- Gibril Ibrahim, February 2021 - October 2021
- Gibril Ibrahim, November 2021 -

== See also ==
- Cabinet of Sudan
- Economy of Sudan
