= Hassan al-Turabi =

Sudanese religious and political leader (1932–2016)

- حسن الترابي
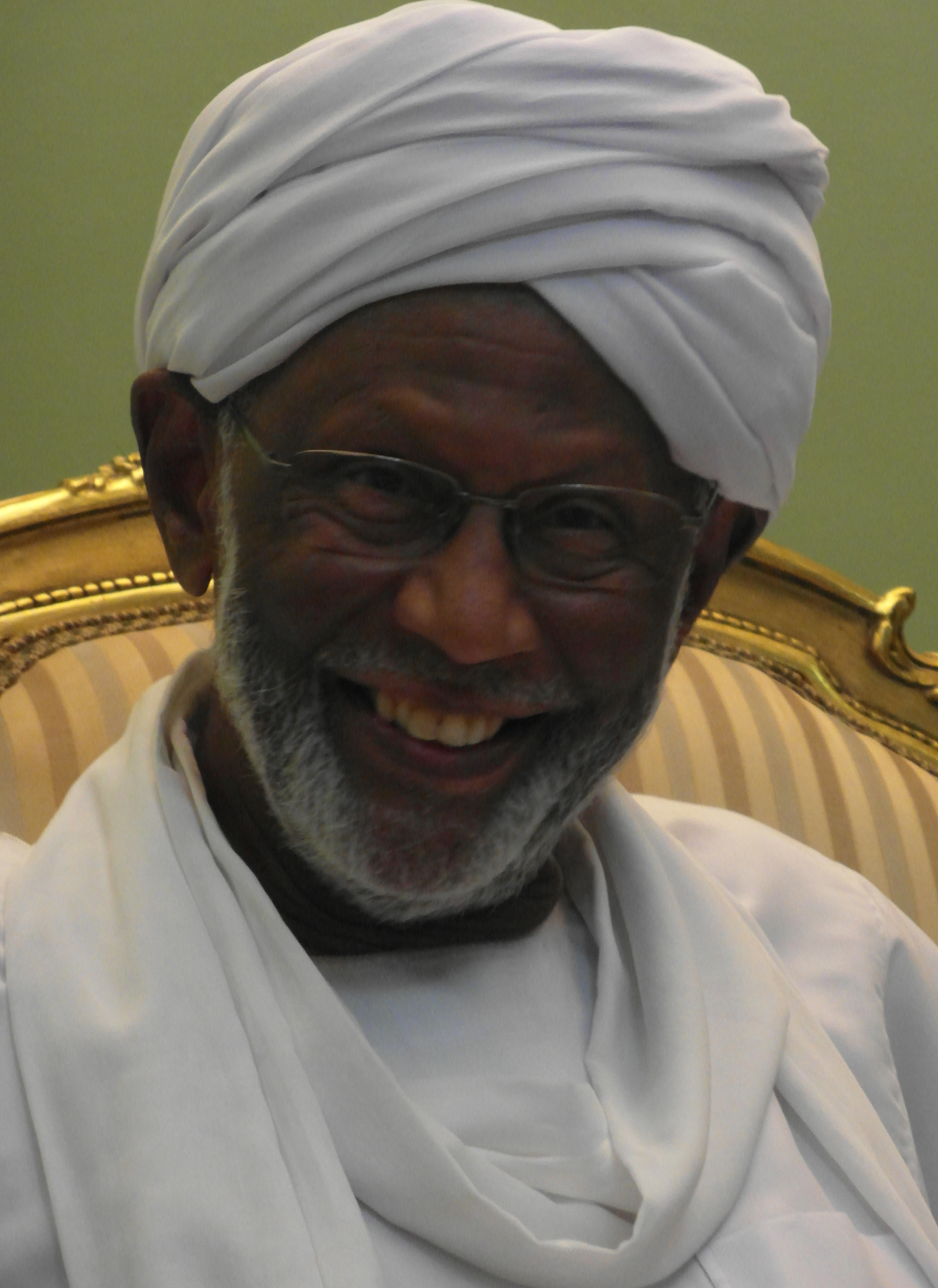
- Al-Turabi in 2015

Leader of the Republic of Sudan
- De facto 30 June 1989 – 21 February 2001
- President: Omar al-Bashir
- Vice President: Zubair Mohamed Salih; Zubair Mohamed Salih (first) and George Kongor Arop (second); Ali Osman Taha (first) and George Kongor Arop (second)
- Preceded by: De jure: Sadiq al-Mahdi (as Prime Minister)
- Succeeded by: De jure: Omar al-Bashir (as President)

Secretary General of the Popular Congress Party
- In office 1999–2016
- Preceded by: Position established
- Succeeded by: Ibrahim al-Sanousi

Speaker of the National Assembly
- In office 1996–1999
- President: Omar al-Bashir
- Preceded by: Mohamed Al-Amin Khalifa
- Succeeded by: Ahmed Ibrahim Al-Tahir

Foreign Minister of Sudan
- In office 1989–1989
- President: Omar al-Bashir
- Preceded by: Hussein Suleiman Abu Saleh
- Succeeded by: Sid Ahmad al-Hussein

Attorney General of Sudan
- In office 1978–1982
- President: Gaafar Nimeiry

Secretary General of the National Islamic Front
- In office October 1964 – 1999

Personal details
- Born: 1 February 1932 Kassala, Anglo-Egyptian Sudan
- Died: 5 March 2016 (aged 84) Khartoum, Sudan
- Party: Popular Congress Party (1999–2016)
- Other political affiliations: National Congress Party (1998–1999); National Islamic Front (1985–1998); Sudanese Socialist Union (1977–1985)
- Spouse: Wissal al-Mahdi
- Relations: Sadiq al-Mahdi (brother-in-law)
- Education: University of Khartoum; King's College London (Law); Sorbonne (PHD)

Hassan al-Turabi (Arabic: حسن الترابي, romanized: Ḥasan al-Turābī; 1 February 1932 – 5 March 2016) was a Sudanese politician, scholar and De facto leader. He was the alleged architect of the 1989 Sudanese military coup that overthrew Sadiq al-Mahdi and installed Omar al-Bashir as president. He has been called "one of the most influential figures in modern Sudanese politics" and a "longtime hard-line ideological leader". He was instrumental in institutionalizing Sharia (Islamic law) in the northern part of the country and was frequently imprisoned in Sudan, but these "periods of detention" were "interspersed with periods of high political office".

al-Turabi was leader of the National Islamic Front (NIF) (which later changed its name to National Congress Party in the late 1990s), a political movement that developed considerable political power in Sudan while never obtaining significant popularity among Sudanese voters. It embraced a "top down" approach to Islamisation by placing party members in high posts in government and security services. al-Turabi and the NIF reached the peak of their power from 1989 following a military coup d'état, until 2001, as what Human Rights Watch have called "the power behind the throne", head of the first Sunni Islamist movement to take control of a state.

al-Turabi oversaw highly controversial policies such as the creation of the "NIF police state" and associated NIF militias that consolidated Islamist power and prevented a popular uprising, but according to Human Rights Watch committed many human rights abuses, including "summary executions, torture, ill treatment, arbitrary detentions, denial of freedoms of speech, assembly, and religion, and violations of the rules of war, particularly in the south". Turabi was a leader of opposition to the American–Saudi "coalition forces" in the Gulf War, establishing in 1990–1991 the Popular Arab and Islamic Congress (PAIC), a regional umbrella for political Islamist militants, headquartered in Khartoum.

After 1996, al-Turabi and his party's "internationalist and ideological wing" saw a decline in influence in favor of more pragmatic leaders, brought on by the imposition of UN sanctions on Sudan in punishment for Sudan's assistance to Egyptian Islamic Jihad in their attempt to assassinate Egyptian President Hosni Mubarak. al-Turabi was out of power beginning in 1999, leading a splinter group of the National Congress known as the Popular National Congress. He was imprisoned by Omar Al-Bashir on 17 January 2011 for nine days, following civil unrest across the Arab world. He died in 2016 without facing trial for his role in the 1989 coup.

== Early life and education ==
al-Turabi was born on 1 February 1932 in Kassala, eastern Sudan, to a Sufi Muslim sheikh, and received an Islamic education, before coming to Khartoum in 1951 to study law and joined the Muslim Brotherhood as a student. He graduated from Khartoum University School of Law in 1955 and also studied in London and at the Sorbonne in Paris in 1962, where he gained a PhD. He became a leader of the Sudanese Muslim Brotherhood in the early 1960s. He is a descendant of a famous 17th-century religious sheikh, Hamad al-Turabi.

== Religious and political beliefs ==
Turabi's writings, rhetoric, sermons, and public pronouncements have often been described as progressive, theologically liberal, "moderate and thoughtful", but his time in power was notable for harsh human rights violations. The diplomat Andrew Natsios explained these contradictions by claiming that he took more moderate positions when being interviewed by English and French-speaking interviewers when compared to his speeches to his fellow Islamists.

al-Turabi's philosophy drew selectively from Sudanese, Islamic, and Western political thought to fashion an ideology for the pursuit of power. al-Turabi supported Sharia and the concept of an Islamic state, but his vision was not Wahhabi or Salafi. He appreciated that the majority of Sudanese followed Sufi Islam, which he set out to change with new ideas. He did not extend legitimacy to Sufis, Mahdists, and Islamic scholars, whom he saw as incapable of addressing the challenges of modern life. One of the strengths of his vision was to consider different trends in Islam. Although the political base for his ideas was probably relatively small, he had an important influence on Sudanese politics and religion.

His views on the role of women in society were relatively progressive. al-Turabi had his greatest success in recruiting supporters from the educated and professional classes in urban areas. He attached fundamental importance to the concept of shura (consultation) and ibtila, his view of modernity, which he believed should lead to a more profound worship of God. Religion was regularly tested by the reality of ibtila.

As a Sunni Islamist, Turabi's ideas differed in some ways from traditional Islamic ideas, such as in his lack of reverence for professional Islamic scholars. Rather than the ulama (class of Islamic scholars) being restricted to educated Islamic scholars, he stated that "because all knowledge is divine and religious, a chemist, an engineer, an economist or a jurist are all ulamas." In fact, in an Islamic democracy, which Turabi maintained he was working towards,

ideally there is no clerical ulama class, which prevents an elitist or theocratic government. Whether termed a religious, a theocratic, or even a secular theocracy, an Islamic state is not a government of the ulama.

al-Turabi originally espoused progressive Islamist ideas, such as the embrace of democracy, healing the breach and expanding the rights of women, where he noted:

The Prophet himself used to visit women, not men, for counseling and advice. They could lead prayer. Even in his battles, they are there! In the election between Othman and Ali to determine who will be the successor to the Prophet, they voted!

He told another interviewer, "I want women to work and become part of public life" because "the home doesn't require much work anymore, what with all the appliances". During an interview on al-Arabiya TV in 2006, al-Turabi describes the word hijab as not a face veil but a cover or diaphragm put in a room to separate between men and the Prophet's wives, whereas niqab is just an old Arab habit. Hijab literally means "barrier" and he said it was "a curtain in the Prophet's room. Naturally, it was impossible for the Prophet's wife to sit there when people entered the room". The Prophet's wives sat behind it when talking to males because they were not allowed to show their faces. He opposed the death penalty for apostasy from Islam and opposed Ayatollah Khomeini's death sentence fatwa against Salman Rushdie. He declared Islamist organizations "too focused on narrow historical debates and behavioral issues of what should be forbidden, at the expense of economic and social development".

al-Turabi also laid out his vision for Sharia law that would be applied gradually instead of forcefully and would apply only to Muslims, who would share power with the Christians in a federal system.

In contrast Natsios writes that when in power,

one of the pieces of national legislation he pressed for was that apostasy be punished by the death penalty, a position he has since disavowed. When he talks about women's rights, he is referring exclusively to Muslim women, whose honor and virtue will be protected within the context of Sharia law, ... Christian or non-Muslim women may be treated as property without rights or protection.

In 2006, out-of-power again, al-Turabi made international headlines issuing a fatwa allowing Muslim women to marry non-Muslim men, and allowing alcohol consumption in certain situations, in contradiction to historical Sharia law. He also embraced human rights and democracy in "a hundred-and-eighty-degree turn" of his views. One critic of Turabi complained to an American journalist in Khartoum of Turabi's ideological reversal, saying, "it is said in the daily papers and in the discussion centers here in the university that Turabi killed Ustazh Mahmoud", (i.e. liberal Sudanese cleric Mahmoud Mohammed Taha, hanged in 1985), "and now he's stealing his ideas."

== Political career ==
Early in his career, al-Turabi took control of Islamic Liberation Movement under the name of the Sudanese Muslim Brotherhood. In 1964 he became secretary-general of the Islamic Charter Front (ICF), an activist movement that served as the political arm of the Muslim Brotherhood, and was elected to parliament in the mid-1960s. He headed the Front of the Islamic Pact and the Party of the Islamic Bloc from 1964 50 1969. Following the military coup in 1969, Gaafar Nimeiry jailed al-Turabi for seven years. Released in 1977, al-Turabi became attorney general in 1979 and then Nimeiry's foreign affairs adviser in 1983. Nimeiry put him back in prison in 1985; the new military government released him later the same year. al-Turabi established the National Islamic Front (NIF) in 1985 as a replacement for the ICF. al-Turabi held several ministerial positions in government of the democratically elected Sadiq al-Mahdi, which the NIF joined in 1988 as a coalition partner, but he was never comfortable with this arrangement.

== National Islamic Front rule ==
On 30 June 1989, a coup d'état by General Omar Hassan al-Bashir began a process of severe repression, including purges and executions in the upper ranks of the army, the banning of associations, political parties, and independent newspapers and the imprisonment of leading political figures and journalists. From 1989 until 2001, Turabi served as what observers have called the "intellectual architect", or "the power behind the throne", sometimes officially as leader of the NIF and sometimes as speaker of the parliamentary assembly.

=== 1989 coup ===
While there is a "pervasive belief" in Sudan that Turabi and the NIF actively collaborated with the coup-makers who called themselves the "Revolutionary Command Council for National Salvation", in fact the RCC-NS banned all political parties following the 1989 coup and arrested Turabi, as well as the leaders of other political parties, and held him in solitary confinement for several months. Before long however, NIF influence within the government was evident in its policies and in the presence of several NIF members in the cabinet.

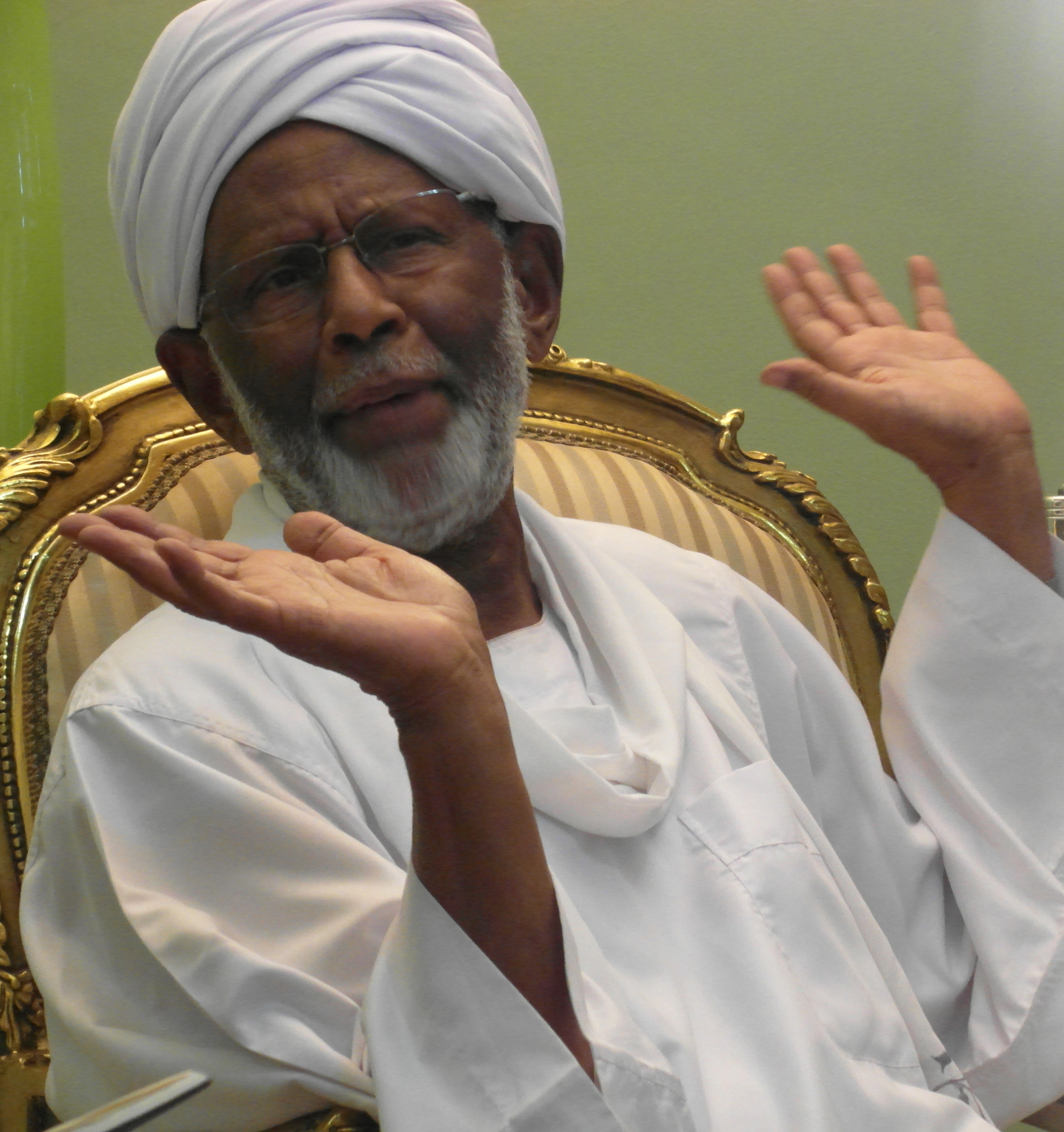
Turabi in his private home in Shambat one year before his death

=== Alleged abuses ===
Alleged human rights abuses by the NIF regime included war crimes, ethnic cleansing, a revival of slavery, torture of opponents, and an unprecedented number of refugees fleeing into Uganda, Kenya, Eritrea, Egypt, Europe and North America.

In 1994 a report issued by Human Rights Watch/Africa, conducted by Gáspár Bíró, a Hungarian law professor and the United Nations' special envoy to Sudan in 1993 found the Sudanese government to be practicing "widespread and systematic torture" of political detainees.

Once uncommon in the Sudan, torture was now widespread, especially in the south. Non-Muslim women were raped, their children taken from them; paper bags filled with chili powder were placed over men's heads, and some were tied to anthills; testicles were crushed and burned by cigarettes and electric current, according to a 1994 report by Human Rights Watch/Africa.

=== Karate attack on al-Turabi in Ottawa ===
On 26 May 1992 al-Turabi was attacked at the Ottawa Macdonald–Cartier International Airport in Canada by Sudanese Karate Black belt master, Hashim Bedreddin Mohammed. He attacked al-Turabi by using two knifehand strikes to knock down Turabi, whose head struck the pavement putting him into a coma. Hashim was a Sufi in exile and an opponent of the National Islamic Front Islamist regime in Sudan and had won a karate world championship in 1983. He attacked al-Turabi in a rage when he saw him. A Somali man pushed Hashim away with a trolley which weakened the blow that could have otherwise killed al-Turabi. al-Turabi was hospitalized for 4 weeks with constant black outs. After al-Turabi was knocked out, Hashim assumed he was dead and departed. al-Turabi suffered from severe injuries, the use of his right arm was lost for a while, he had slurred speech and required the use of a cane. Hashim was supported by exiled Sudanese in Canada who launched the "Friends of Hashim Campaign" to support his attack on al-Turabi. One said "most Sudanese would appreciate what Hashim did". They called for an end to Islamist policies and a return to secularism.

== Links to militant groups ==
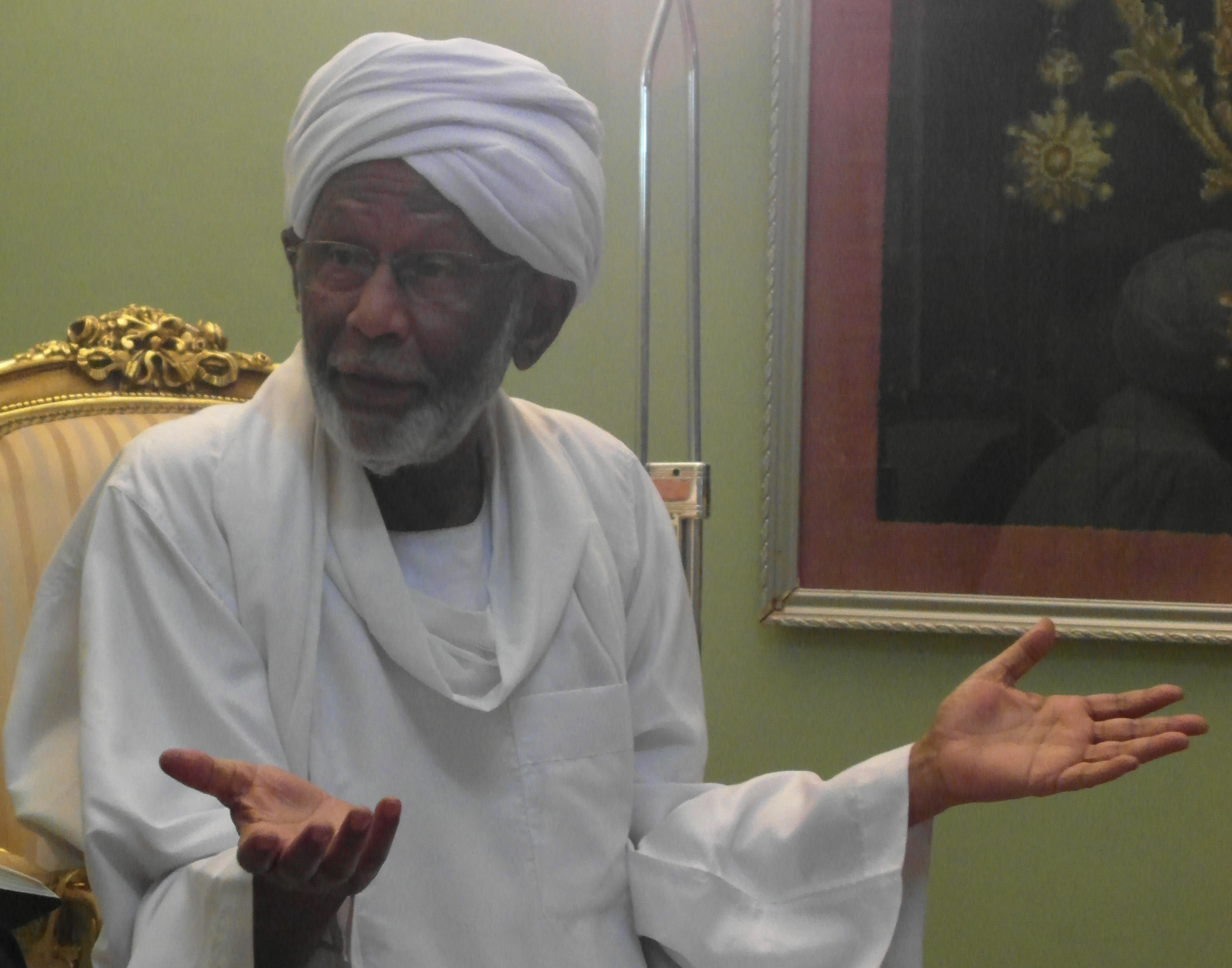
al-Turabi in 2015

Al-Qaeda's leader Osama bin Laden moved his base of operations from Saudi Arabia to Sudan around 1991 reportedly at the personal invitation of al-Turabi, and stayed until 1996 when he moved to Afghanistan. Bin Laden moved to Sudan after conflict with the Saudi government over their granting of permission to the United States to station troops in Saudi Arabia during the Gulf War against Saddam Hussein. Bin Laden believed he should lead the fight against Saddam using Afghan Arab forces. al-Turabi granted bin Laden a safe place from which to conduct jihadist activities; in return, bin Laden agreed to help the Sudanese government in roadbuilding and to fight animist and Christian separatists in Southern Sudan. While in Sudan, bin Laden is reported to have married one of al-Turabi's nieces.

Other violent groups al-Turabi invited and allowed to operate freely included Abu Nidal Organization, (which reportedly had killed more than 900 people in 20 different countries) Hezbollah, and Carlos the Jackal, (posing as a French arms dealer at the time). Carlos had converted from Marxism to Islamic extremism. (Sudanese sanctuary was not unconditional as it later allowed French intelligence to kidnap Carlos the Jackal while he was undergoing an operation on his right testicle.")

al-Turabi founded the Popular Arab and Islamic Congress in 1990–1991. Meeting here were several Islamic groups from around the world, including representatives from the Palestine Liberation Organization, Hamas, the Egyptian Islamic Jihad, the Algerian Islamic Jihad, and Hezbollah. In late 1991 or 1992 al-Turabi sought to persuade Shiites and Sunnis to put aside their divisions and join against the common enemy.

In August 1993, Sudan was placed on the United States' list of State Sponsors of Terrorism following the 1993 World Trade Center bombing in February. The U.S. State Department notes that "five of 15 suspects arrested" following the bombing were Sudanese.

=== Mubarak assassination attempt ===
Two years later an assassination attempt was made on then Egyptian President Hosni Mubarak by Egyptian Islamic Jihad organization, many of whose members were living in exile in Sudan. Evidence from the Egyptian and Ethiopian governments implicated the Sudanese government

The debacle led to a unanimous vote in the United Nations to impose stiff economic sanctions on Sudan. The Sudanese representative denied the charges, but the Sudanese delegation was already in disfavor, having been implicated only two years earlier in a plot to blow up UN headquarters.

Rather than disassociate himself from the plot, al-Turabi praised the attempted killing and called Mubarak stupid:

The sons of the Prophet Moses, the Muslims, rose up against him confounded his plans, and sent him back to his country...I found the man to be very far below my level of thinking and my view, and too stupid to understand my pronouncements.

== Decline of influence ==
International sanctions took effect in April 1996 and were accompanied by a "general withdrawal of the diplomatic community" from Khartoum. At the same time Sudan worked to appease the United States and other international critics by expelling members of the Egyptian Islamic Jihad and encouraging bin Laden to leave.

In March 1996, national elections were held for the first time since the coup, and al-Turabi was elected to a seat in the National Assembly, where he served as speaker during the 1990s. This was his first instance of holding a political position with some consistency. During the "last few years of the 1990s", his influence and that of his party's "'internationalist' and ideological wing" waned "in favor of the 'nationalist' or more pragmatic leaders who focus on trying to recover from Sudan's disastrous international isolation and economic damage that resulted from ideological adventurism".

=== Imprisonment and later years ===
After a political falling out with President Omar al-Bashir in 1999, al-Turabi was imprisoned based on allegations of conspiracy before being released in October 2003. Arrested again in 2004 for allegedly being part of a plot to overthrow the government, he was released on 28 June 2005.

In 2004 he was reported to have been associated with the Justice and Equality Movement (JEM), an Islamist armed rebel group involved in the War in Darfur, whose leader, Khalil Ibrahim, was previously a follower of Mr. al-Turabi. al-Turabi himself has denied any association. Turabi spent 16 months in prison from 2004 until 28 June 2005, during which time he spent several weeks on a hunger strike.

After the JEM attacked Khartoum and Omdurman on 10 May 2008, al-Turabi was arrested on the morning of 12 May 2008, along with other members of his Popular Congress Party (PCP). He said that he had expected the arrest, which occurred while he was returning to Khartoum from a PCP gathering in Sennar. He was questioned and released without charge later in the day, after about 12 hours in detention.

Presidential advisor Mustafa Osman Ismail said that al-Turabi's name had been found on JEM documents, but he denied that al-Turabi had been arrested, asserting that he had merely been "summoned" for questioning. al-Turabi, however, said that it was an arrest and that he had been held at Kobar Prison. According to al-Turabi, he was questioned regarding the relationship between the PCP and JEM, but he did not answer this question, although he denied that there was a relationship after his release; he also said that he was asked why he did not condemn the rebel attack. He said that the security officers questioning him had "terrified" him and that, although they claimed to have proof against him, they did not show him this proof when he asked to see it.

Salva Kiir, the First Vice-President of Sudan and President of the Government of Southern Sudan, said that there had been no discussion about arresting al-Turabi at a presidency meeting on the previous day and that there was no security report implicating him. He alleged that al-Turabi was being used as a scapegoat.

In an interview on 17 May 2008, al-Turabi described the JEM's attack on Khartoum as "positive" and said that there was "so much misery in Darfur, genocidal measures actually". He also said that the JEM attack could spark more unrest.

On 12 January 2009, al-Turabi called on Bashir to surrender himself to the International Criminal Court for the sake of the country, while holding Bashir politically responsible for war crimes in Darfur. (He later changed his position and opposed Bashir turning himself in.) He was then arrested on 14 January and held in prison for two months (until 8 March) at the Kobar Prison before being moved to Port Sudan prison. During this time members of his family expressed concern about his health and his being held in solitary confinement at least some of the time. Amnesty International also released a statement about al-Turabi's arrest on 16 January, describing it as "arbitrary" and politically motivated. Noting al-Turabi's advanced age and his need for medication and a special diet. The Sudanese Media Centre reported on 19 January that al-Turabi would be put on trial for his alleged assistance to the JEM.

On 8 March, he was released only days after the International Criminal Court issued an arrest warrant against Omar al-Bashir. On 11 April 2009, the PCP called for the creation of a transitional government to lead Sudan to the planned 2010 election, and al-Turabi suggested that he would not stand as a candidate due to his advanced age; he emphasized the importance of leadership coming from younger generations and said that he did not have enough energy to run. In April al-Turabi was stopped at Khartoum International Airport and prevented from travelling to Paris for medical tests despite having obtained permission to travel from the interior ministry.

al-Turabi announced on 2 January 2010 that the PCP had designated his deputy, Abdallah Deng Nhial, as its candidate for the 2010 presidential election. al-Turabi was again arrested in mid May 2010, but was released on 1 July 2010.

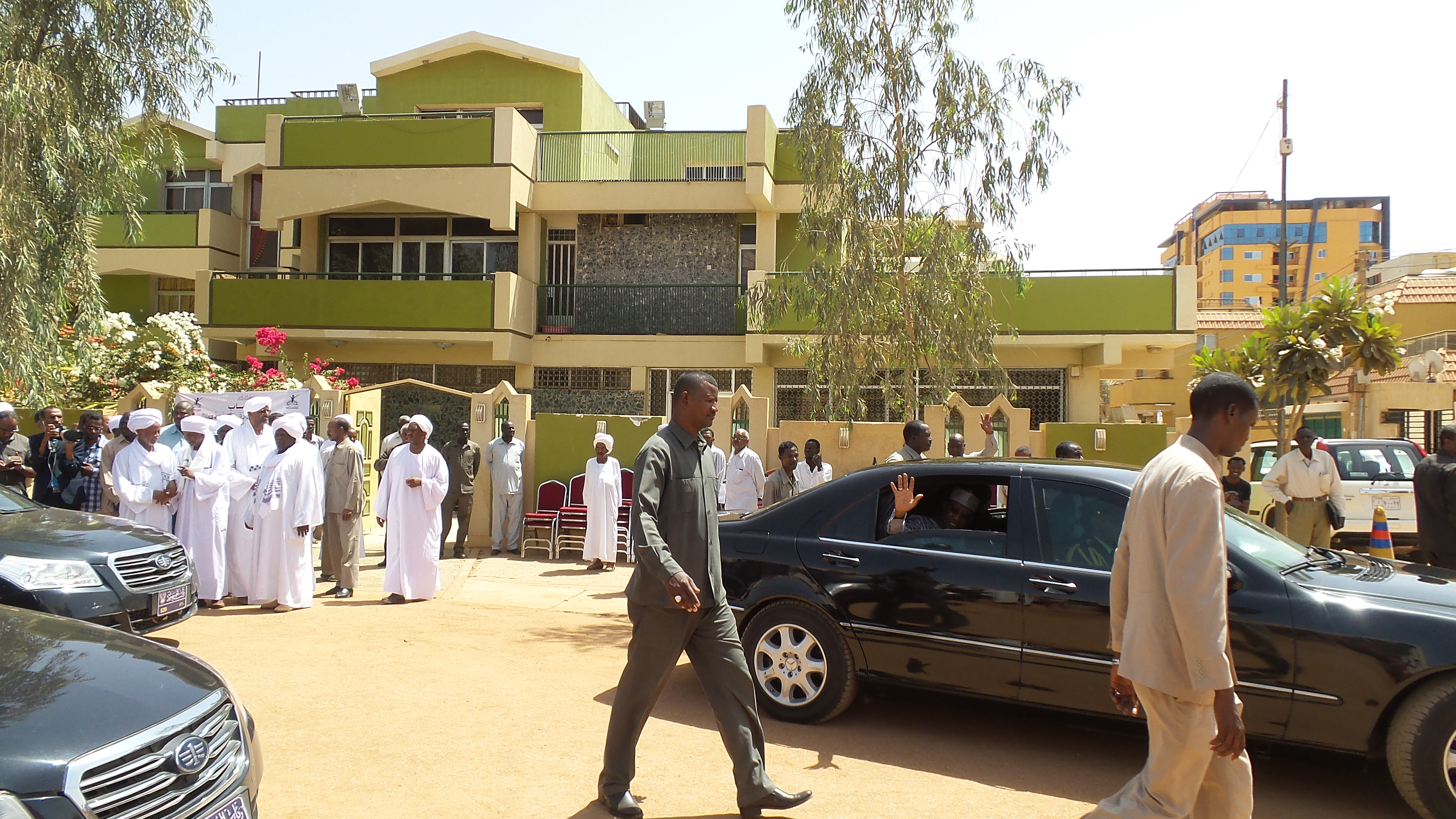
Chadian president Idriss Déby leaving the late Turabi's private estate after attending mourning ceremonies

On 18 January 2011, security forces arrested al-Turabi in Khartoum, presumably due to the recent instability of Sudan's politics. al-Turabi commented on the recent price rises in Sudan stating it could result at a "popular uprising" if the unrealistic rises were not reversed. He added that the government should take lessons from the recent Tunisian Revolution.

== Death ==
On 5 March 2016, Turabi died at a hospital in Khartoum at the age of 84. He was believed to have died of a heart attack. Turabi's funeral was held the next day, with several thousand mourners in attendance, and he was buried at Burri Al-Lamab, a cemetery in eastern Khartoum.
