= Sudanese Congress Party =

Political party in Sudan

Sudanese Congress Party حزب المؤتمر السوداني
- Secretary-General: Khalid Omer Yousif
- Founded: 1986
- Ideology: Social democracy
- Political position: Centre-left
- Member of: National Consensus Forces

Website
- sudancongress.com

The Sudanese Congress Party (SCP or SCoP) is a Sudanese centre-left, social democratic, pro-secular political party created in 1986 as National Congress (unrelated to the National Congress Party) and renamed as the SCP in 2005.

== Creation ==
Khalid Omer Yousif, former secretary-general of the Sudanese Congress Party (SCP), describes the origin of the SCP in terms of three events: the 1977 creation of the Congress of Independent Students (CIS) at Khartoum University by students opposed to president Gaafar Nimeiry; the creation in 1986, following the 1985 Sudanese Revolution, of the National Congress political party led by Molana Abdel Majid Imam (unrelated to the Islamist, pan-Arabist National Congress Party); and the renaming of the National Congress to the Sudanese Congress Party in a 2005 conference between National Congress and CIS members and graduates.

== Leadership and structure ==
The first head of the SCP was Abdel-Mageed Imam and the second was Ibrahim al-Sheikh. As of November 2016, Omer al-Digair had been "recently" elected as the third head of the SCP. Abdelmonim Omar was Acting President of the SCP in early December 2012.

== Persecution ==
=== Al-Bashir presidency ===
On 6 July 2015, SCP party members Mastoor Ahmad Mohammed, Asim Omar Hassan and Ibrahim Mohammed Zain were flogged in Omdurman after being sentenced in the Omdurman Criminal Court for their campaigning for a boycoot of the April 2015 Sudanese general election.

SCP chairman Ibrahim al-Shaikh Abdel Rahman as arrested on 8 June 2014 and detained for 100 days after he publicly criticised the Rapid Support Forces (RSF).

NISS arrested SCP chair Omer al-Digair and seven other key SCP members on the night of 8/9 November 2016, after having arrested 13 other SCP members earlier, who remained in detention. The arrests were carried out in response to "protests and popular activities", according to the SCP.

=== Hamdok government ===
In late November 2019, the RSF lodged a legal complaint against Hanadi El Siddig, editor-in-chief of the SCP's newspaper, Akhbar El Watan. El Siddig was charged under the Information Crimes Act for a column Without Borders that she wrote. SCP legal coordinator Kamal Mohamed El Amin described the complaint and charges as "tools of the former Al Bashir regime" used to oppose freedom of speech.

== Programmes and actions ==
In 2016, the SCP was described by Radio Dabanga as "one of the most active opposition parties in Sudan". In December 2016, the SCP supported a 3-day civil disobedience action against economic austerity measures that caused "huge price hikes". On 15 December 2025, the Sudanese Congress Party expelled Mohamed Hassan Arabi and five other members for signing the charter of the Tasis alliance, with a party spokesperson stating they did not represent the party.

The SCP is a member of the National Consensus Forces.
