= Arab Socialist Ba'ath Party – Organization of Sudan =

Political party in Sudan

Arab Socialist Ba'ath Party – Organization of Sudan حزب البعث العربي الاشتراكي - تنظيم في السودان
- Leader: Al-Tijani Mustafa Yassin
- Founded: 1980
- Headquarters: Khartoum
- Ideology: Neo-Ba'athism
- International affiliation: Syrian-led Ba'ath Party
- Colors: Black, Red, White and Green (Pan-Arab colors)
- National Assembly (2019): 0 / 426

Party flag

The Arab Socialist Ba'ath Party – Organization of Sudan (Arabic: حزب البعث العربي الاشتراكي - تنظيم في السودان Ḥizb al-Ba‘th al-‘Arabī al-Ishtirākī - Tanẓīm fī al-Sūdān) is the regional branch of the Damascus-based Arab Socialist Ba'ath Party in Sudan.

During the 1980s, the party was called Arab Socialist Ba'ath Party – Organization of Sudan (differentiating it from the pro-Iraqi Arab Socialist Ba'ath Party – Region of Sudan). The party contested the 1986 election as part of the Sudanese Progressive National Front.

The party held its third regional congress in Khartoum on February 5–6, 2009. The congress elected Al-Tijani Mustafa Yassin as regional secretary, an 11-member Regional Command and a 23-member Central Committee. The congress stated that the party sought cooperation with the National Congress Party for the sake of forming a national front. The party staunchly opposed independence of South Sudan.

== See also ==
- Arab Socialist Ba'ath Party – Region of Sudan
- Sudanese Ba'ath Party
