= Magdi Hassan Yassin =

Sudanese politician and economist

Magdi Hassan Yassin is a Sudanese politician and economist.

== Career ==
Yassin was the minister of finance between March and September 2019.
