= Gibril Ibrahim =

Sudanese politician (born 1955)

- جبريل إبراهيم
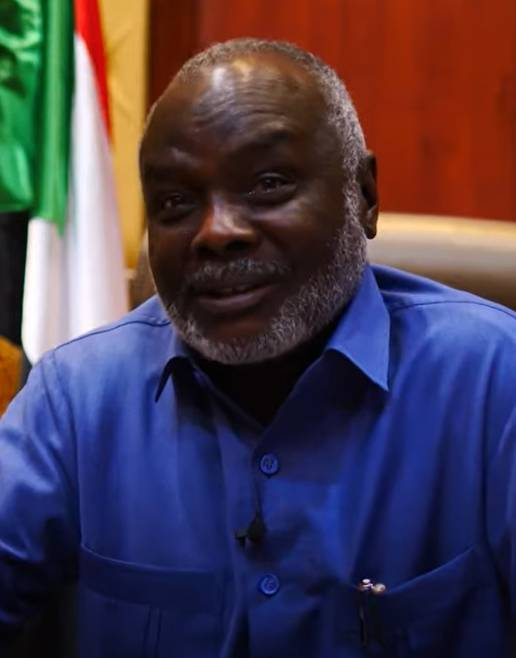
- Ibrahim in 2023

Minister of Finance
- Incumbent
- Assumed office 21 November 2021
- Prime Minister: Abdalla Hamdok; Osman Hussein (acting); Dafallah al-Haj Ali (acting); Kamil Idris
- Preceded by: Himself
- In office 10 February 2021 – 25 October 2021
- Prime Minister: Abdalla Hamdok
- Preceded by: Hiba Mohamed Ali Ahmed
- Succeeded by: Himself

Chairman of the Justice and Equality Movement
- Incumbent
- Assumed office 26 January 2012
- Preceded by: Khalil Ibrahim

Personal details
- Born: Gibril Ibrahim Mohammed; 1 May 1955 (age 71) Altina, Darfur, Anglo-Egyptian Sudan
- Party: JEM
- Relatives: Khalil (brother)
- Education: University of Khartoum; Meiji University

Gibril Ibrahim Mohammed (Arabic: جبريل إبراهيم محمد, romanized: Jibrīl Ibrāhīm Muḥammad, born 1 May 1955), often spelled Jibril, is a Sudanese politician who has been the Minister of Finance since 2021. He has also been the chairman of the Justice and Equality Movement (JEM) since 2012, after the death of his brother, Khalil. In October 2020 he signed the Juba Peace Agreement. As chairman of the JEM, he was neutral in the 2023 War in Sudan from April until November, when he allied with the Sudanese Armed Forces.

== Biography ==
Ibrahim was born on 1 January 1955 in al-Tina, North Darfur, in what was then Anglo-Egyptian Sudan. His father died when he was 4. Ibrahim studied for an undergraduate degree at the University of Khartoum, before leaving Sudan at the age of 25.

Ibrahim was offered a scholarship in Japan, where he spent 7 years, completing his master's degree and doctorate in economics at Meiji University. He became a fluent Japanese speaker. Ibrahim later returned to Sudan, before leaving again for Dubai in 2000 due to his opposition to the government. In Dubai he served as the Economic Advisor for JEM for 6 years, before travelling to the United Kingdom in 2006 to serve as the Justice and Equality Movement's (JEM) Secretary of Foreign Affairs. Ibrahim formerly taught as associate professor of economics at King Saud University in Saudi Arabia. He was part of JEM's negotiating team at the failed peace talks in Abuja and Doha.

On 26 January 2012 he was elected chairman of the JEM, after his brother, Khalil, had been killed in a Sudanese Air Force airstrike in Northern Kordofan in December 2011.

In October 2020, Ibrahim, as leader of the JEM and one of the leaders of the Sudan Revolutionary Front, he signed the Juba Peace Agreement. This resulted in his naming as Minister of Finance in the cabinet of Abdalla Hamdok on 10 February 2021. He continued to hold the position after the events of the 2021 Sudanese coup d'état on 25 October.

In March 2023 he argued for an inclusive government and ultimately the integration of all armed forces to the Sudanese Armed Forces.

At the start of hostilities in the 2023 War in Sudan Ibrahim and his JEM pledged neutrality. He also called for a halt of the fighting. In September 2023, Ibrahim's home in Al-Manshiyya, Khartoum was raided and the leader of his guard team and two others were detained by the Rapid Support Forces (RSF). In November 2023 he announced that the JEM would participate in the 2023 Sudan war on the side of the SAF. As finance minister he saw the Sudanese pound lose 100% of its value compared to the situation before the war, which was caused by a high demand for foreign currency. The economy declined by 40% in 2023 and had a projected decrease of a further 28% in 2024.

On 12 September 2025, the United States imposed sanctions on Ibrahim over his role in the civil war and connections with Iran.
