= Sudanese Ba'ath Party =

Political party in Sudan

Sudanese Ba'ath Party حزب البعث السوداني
- Leader: Mohamed Ali Jadin
- Founded: 2002
- Split from: Arab Socialist Ba'ath Party – Country of Sudan
- Headquarters: Khartoum
- Ideology: Ba'athism
- National affiliation: National Consensus Forces
- Colors: Black, Red, White and Green (Pan-Arab colors)
- National Assembly: 0 / 426

Party flag

Sudanese Ba'ath Party (Arabic: حزب البعث السوداني, Ḥizb al-Ba‘th al-Sūdānī) is a political party in Sudan. It is said to be neutral to the Syria-Iraq split within Ba'athist politics.

== History ==
The party emerged from a split within the pro-Iraqi Arab Socialist Ba'ath Party – Country of Sudan in 2002. Another Sudanese faction, led by Kamal Bolad remained in the pan-Arab party.

== Prominent members ==
In 2010, Mohamed Ali Jadein was a prominent member of the Sudanese Ba'ath Party. In 2013, his group was viewed as having split from the "Ba'ath (Sudan Region) Party". Taysir El Nourani became minister of labour and administrative reform in the government of prime minister Abdalla Hamdok for the party in February 2021.
