= Arab Socialist Ba'ath Party – Region of Sudan =

Political party in Sudan

Arab Socialist Ba'ath Party – Region of Sudan حزب البعث العربي الاشتراكي - وطن في السودان
- Founded: 1970
- Headquarters: Khartoum
- Ideology: Ba'athism; Saddamism
- National affiliation: National Consensus Forces
- International affiliation: Iraqi-led Ba'ath Party
- Colors: Black, Red, White and Green
- National Assembly: 0 / 426

Party flag

The Arab Socialist Ba'ath Party – Region of Sudan (Arabic: حزب البعث العربي الاشتراكي - وطن في السودان Ḥizb al-Ba‘th al-‘Arabī al-Ishtirākī - Waṭan fī al-Sūdān), previously known as the Arab Socialist Ba'ath Party – Country of Sudan, is a political party in Sudan. The party is the Sudanese regional branch of the Iraqi-led Ba'ath Party in Sudan. While the branch has always been small, accounting for an estimated 1,000 members in 2003, it has been able to have a bigger impact than what its meager membership numbers would suggest, mostly due to Iraqi financing of the branch.

After collaborating with the Arab nationalist Sudanese government for years, the Ba'ath Party broke off relations and became an opposition party in 1990; this would have disturbed Iraq if Sudan had not supported it during the 1991 Gulf crisis. In 1990, the party was composed largely of students who had studied in Ba'athist Iraq. The party, which was small in 1990, was influential in certain sectors, and was opposed to the National Islamic Front and was staunchly secularist. Members have historically been torn between the Ba'ath and other secular party movements, such as the Sudanese Communist Party. Despite Saddam Hussein's amicable relationship with the Revolutionary Command Council for National Salvation, the body ruling Sudan at the time, the Ba'ath branch was oppressed by the authorities. Later in 1990, 26 Ba'athi military officers were executed in Khartoum after a failed military coup.

In 2002, a group led by Mohamad Ali Jadein broke away from the branch and established the independent Sudanese Ba'ath Party, which has no affiliation with either the Iraqi or the Syrian-led Ba'ath Party. The following year, after the 2003 invasion of Iraq, 80 Sudanese Ba'athists were allowed to return to Sudan under the condition that they would stay out of politics.

== Leaders ==
- Kamal Bolad in 1989
- Taiseer Mutassir in 1990.

== Sources ==
- Sassoon, Joseph (2012). Saddam Hussein's Ba'th Party: Inside an Authoritarian Regime (1st ed.). Cambridge University Press. ISBN 978-0-521-14915-0.
