= 2010 Sudanese general election =

- 11–15 April 2010
- Presidential election
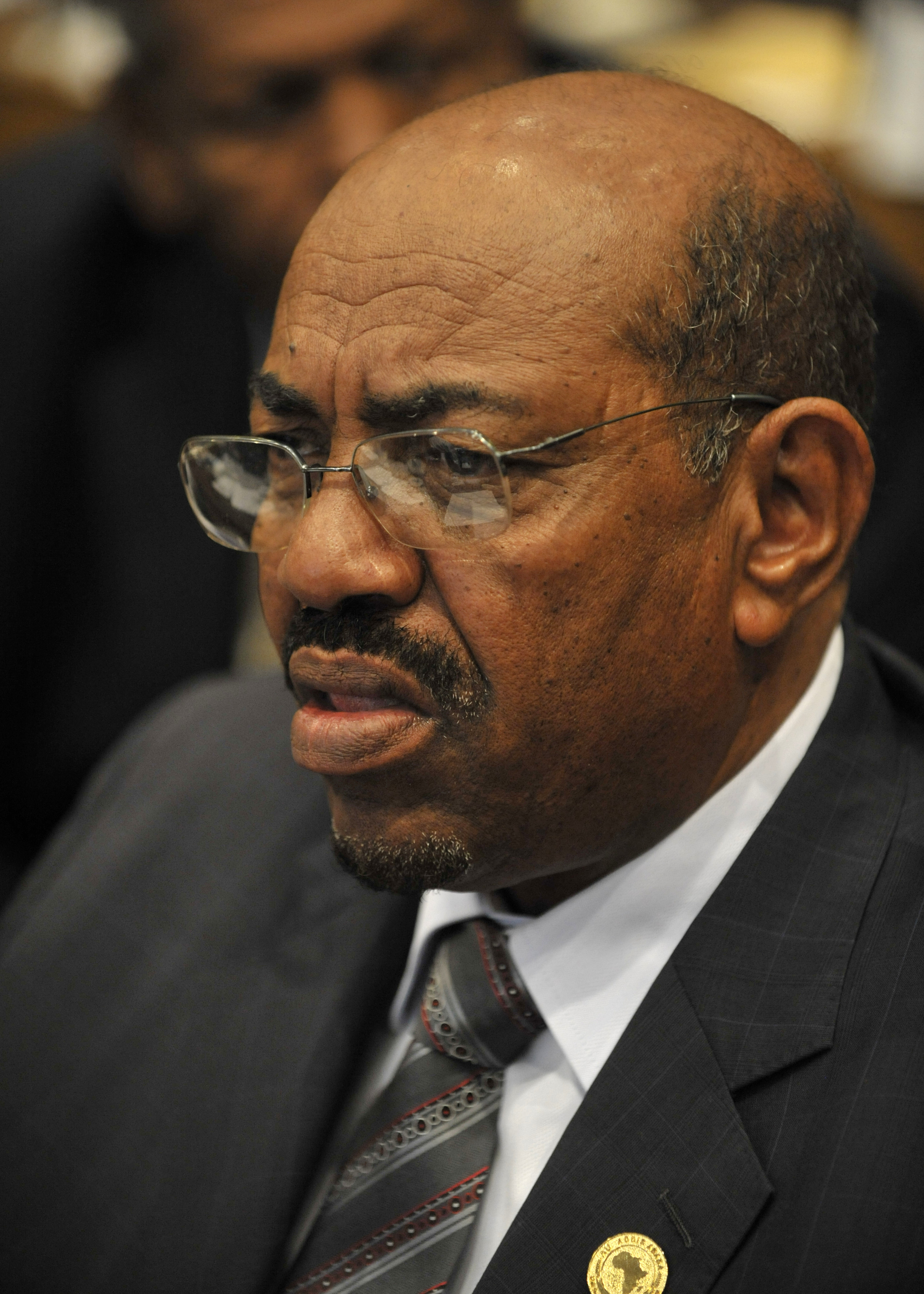

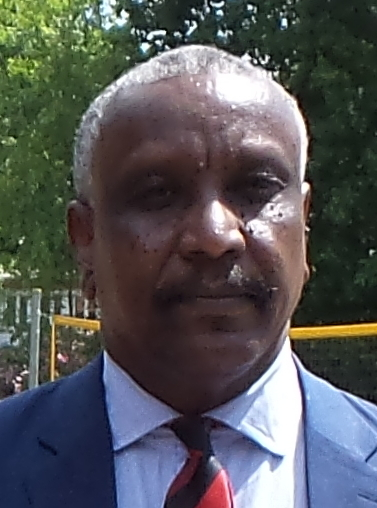
Nominee	Omar al-Bashir	Yasir Arman
Party	National Congress	SPLM
Popular vote	6,901,694	2,193,826
Percentage	68.24%	21.69%
President before election
Omar al-Bashir
National Congress
Elected President
Omar al-Bashir
National Congress
- National Assembly election
- All 450 seats in the National Assembly; 226 seats needed for a majority
Party	Leader	Seats	+/–
National Congress	Omar al-Bashir	324	−31
SPLM	Salva Kiir	99	New
PCP	Hassan al-Turabi	4	New
DUP	Hatim al-Sir	4	New
Federal Umma	Ahmad Babiker Nahar	3	New
Umma Renewal & Reform	Mubarak al Mahdi	3	New
DUP–Original		1	New
SPLM–Democratic Change	Lam Akol	2	New
Muslim Brotherhood		1	New
NUP	Sadiq al-Mahdi	1	New
Umma Collective Leadership	Sadiq al-Hadi	1	New
Independents	–	3	−2
This lists parties that won seats. See the complete results below.

General elections were held in Sudan between 11 and 15 April 2010, extended from the original end date of 13 April. The elections were held to elect the president and National Assembly of Sudan, as well as the president and Legislative Assembly of Southern Sudan. The election brought to the end the transitional period which began when the decades-long Second Sudanese Civil War ended in 2005.

Early results on 20 April showed that President Omar al-Bashir's National Congress Party was well ahead. On 26 April, full results were announced and al-Bashir was confirmed as the winner by having received 68.24% of the vote.

== Background ==
=== Date ===
The elections were originally scheduled to be held from March to April 2009, but there were reports that they may be delayed up to six months from the latest possible date of July 2009 due to problems with the preparation of the vote. However, on 2 April 2009, the electoral commission pushed the date back to 6 February to 21 February 2010 and results were to be declared on 27 February 2010. The elections will entail: national presidential and parliamentary, the south Sudanese presidency, state governors, the southern parliament, and state assemblies. The voting will be early in the month so results may be fielded late in the month. The electoral commission released the date after the International Criminal Court issued an arrest warrant for President Bashir on 4 March 2009.

On 11 June 2009, it was rumoured that the elections might be delayed for a short time once more. This was immediately rejected by the government. However, it was announced on 30 June 2009 that the election would be postponed until 5 April to 12 April 2010 after problems with the national census. The census results were expected early April 2009 but were not released until mid-May 2009; upon its release, the SPLM contested that Southern Sudan are a third of Sudan's total population while the census reported that they made up 21 percent of the total population. It is unknown if the Darfurian amalgamation referendum, due to take place in July 2010, will be pulled back to match the general election.

=== Census ===
A census, which was necessary for the election to be held, was initially planned to be held in July 2007, then from 15 November 2007 onwards, then delayed to be held from 2 February 2008 onwards due to funding issues. It was again postponed to 15–30 April 2008. On 12 April 2008, a few days before the census was slated to start, the SPLM withdrew from the census, stating that they wanted IDPs to return to their homes before the census would take place. However, it was agreed on 14 April 2008 to start the census on 22 April 2008 instead. It was finished by 6 May 2008 (with about 90% of the country covered by then; many people claimed, however, not to have been counted, but officials stated that in no state was the covering rate below 80%.) Preliminary results that hit the press in early July claimed a population of about 38 million, with 3.8 million in Southern Sudan. This strongly contradicted former estimates of at least 8 million residents in the south. However, the Central Bureau of Statistics quickly denied these figures, saying no numbers had yet been released. The full results of the census were announced on a press conference by Central Bureau of Statistics on 12 May 2009. The total of Sudan's population were reported as 39,154,490, with 8,260,490 in the south.

=== Darfur ===
A Sudanese official has stated that elections would be held in "99% of Darfur" and that the election would be held at a later date in those regions where it was not possible at that time.

== Electoral system ==
The draft bill on the electoral law was being discussed in February 2008; differences remained over the proportion between FPTP seats and proportional seats, over the number of seats reserved for women, and over how many votes smaller parties would have to win in order to gain entry into parliament.

At first:

- The SPLM wants 50% proportionally elected and 50% through FPTP, and it wants women to be given 50% of the proportional seats.
- The Sudanese government wants only 40% to be proportionally elected and wants a separate list of women-only seats, of which all would be given to the list with the most votes.

Finally, the election law was passed on 8 July 2008. The law is based on a mixed electoral system, utilizing the benefits of majoritarian, proportional representation and plurality models.

In Sudan, the 450 seats of the National Assembly were elected by three methods:

- 270 seats (60%) were elected by First-past-the-post.
- 112 seats (25%) reserved for women were elected by closed list proportional representation with 4% electoral threshold.
- 68 seats (15%) unreserved were elected by the same system.

The President was elected using the two-round system; if no candidate gained a majority of the vote in the first round, a run-off would have been held, also:

- Candidates for presidential elections require 200 endorsements from 18 of Sudan's 25 states.
- Citizens have to be over 17–40 years old and without a criminal record to stand in the election.

In Southern Sudan, the 170 seats of the Legislative Assembly were elected by three methods:

- 102 seats (60%) were elected by First-past-the-post.
- 43 seats (25%) reserved for women were elected by closed list proportional representation with 4% electoral threshold.
- 25 seats (15%) unreserved were elected by the same system.

The border constituency report was completed by the National Elections Committee in November 2009. Some state politicians have appealed the report and their concerns have been printed in a report published on the National Elections Committee website. Despite these objections, it is likely that the constituency borders will remain. An explanation of the boundary complaints were delineated in a 71-page report by the Rift Valley Institute in 2010.

== Candidates ==
SPLM leader Salva Kiir has stated he will contest the presidential election. He will also be supported by the former eastern rebels from the Beja Congress, to increase the chances of unseating Omar al-Bashir, who has held power since 1989.

69 parties registered for the election.

Opposition parties including the SPLM considered nominating Sadiq al-Mahdi, who was prime minister from 1986 to 1989, as their presidential candidate. Yasir Arman was the SPLM candidate, but the SPLM withdrew from the presidential election, citing fears of fraud.

The university professor Abdullah Ali Ibrahim planned to run as an independent presidential candidate. Islamist opposition leader Hassan al-Turabi announced on 2 January 2010 that his party, the Popular Congress Party, had designated its deputy leader, Abdallah Deng Nhial, as its presidential candidate. One of the renowned female politicians, professor Fatima Abdel Mahmoud, was nominated by the Sudanese Socialist Democratic Union party which she leads, as their candidate for the presidency.

== Controversies ==
There were numerous accusations of irregularities which forced the election to be extended by two additional days for a total of four days. However, former American president Jimmy Carter said he was happy with the extension of voting days while monitoring the elections (along with an EU contingent). On the last day of the elections the head of the ruling party in the south said: "Three days ago at night some southern army soldiers came to the home of the president of the National Congress Party (NCP) in Raja, and killed him and eight other members of the NCP." He claimed it was because of anger that people had voted for the ruling party. The Sudan People's Liberation Movement denied responsibility while having claimed repression.

A video was posted on YouTube which apparently shows election officials in uniform and a child filling out voting strips and stuffing them into ballot boxes, with one saying that he was glad the voting period had been extended for them to finish their work. The clip, which has not been independently verified, is claimed by Sudanese opposition activists as proof to their claims of poll rigging. The National Elections Commission (NEC) however, dismissed it as a fake and refused to investigate it. Even after the result was announced, the opposition claims that there was "massive rigging", and is thinking to challenge the result in the courts.

Issues of manipulation of the electoral districts have also been a problem and were detailed in a report by the Rift Valley Institute in April 2010.

== Results ==
In 16 state constituencies and 17 national constituencies (18 and 15 according to other sources), a repoll was ordered (to be held within 60 days); the results in the other constituencies will be announced on 20 April 2010. 27 MPs (five national, four in the Southern Sudanese Legislative Assembly, and 18 for state assemblies) were elected by default, as they had no opponent in the election.

The National Assembly results were announced on May 20, in which the NCP won 73% of the seats, while the SPLM won 22% of the seats. The remaining five percent was won by the smaller opposition parties.

On 26 April, President Omar al-Bashir's National Congress Party was officially declared the winner after Sudan's election commission announced he received 68% of the votes.

While no full parliamentary election results are available, the NCP won 324 of the 450 seats, and the SPLM won 99 seats. 27 seats went to smaller parties.

=== President ===
Presidential Election results by state.

Candidate	Party	Votes	%
Omar Hassan al-Bashir	National Congress Party	6,901,694	68.24
Yasir Arman	Sudan People's Liberation Movement	2,193,826	21.69
Abdallah Deng Nhial	Popular Congress Party	396,139	3.92
Hatim Al-Sir	Democratic Unionist Party	195,668	1.93
Sadiq al-Mahdi	Umma Party	96,868	0.96
Kamil Idris	Independent	77,132	0.76
Mahmood Ahmed Jeha	Independent	71,708	0.71
Mubarak al-Fadil	Umma Reform and Renewal Party	49,402	0.49
Munir Sheikh El-din Jallab	New National Democratic Party	40,277	0.40
Abdel-Aziz Khalid	Sudanese National Alliance	34,592	0.34
Fatima Abdel Mahmoud	Sudanese Socialist Democratic Union	30,562	0.30
Muhammad Ibrahim Nugud	Sudanese Communist Party	26,442	0.26
Total		10,114,310	100.00
Total votes		10,114,310	–
Registered voters/turnout		16,281,841	62.12
Source: National Electoral Commission

=== National Assembly ===
Party	Votes	%	Seats	+/–
National Congress Party			324	–31
Sudan People's Liberation Movement			99	New
Popular Congress Party			4	New
Democratic Unionist Party			4	New
Federal Umma Party			3	New
Umma Renewal and Reform Party			3	New
Democratic Unionist Party–Original			1	New
Sudan People's Liberation Movement–Democratic Change			2	New
Muslim Brotherhood			1	New
National Umma Party			1	New
Umma Collective Leadership			1	New
Independents			3	–2
Vacant			4	–
Total			450	+90
Registered voters/turnout	16,281,841	–		
Source: National Electoral Commission

=== Southern Sudan ===
==== President ====
Candidate	Party	Votes	%
Salva Kiir	Sudan People's Liberation Movement	2,616,613	92.99
Lam Akol	Sudan People's Liberation Movement–Democratic Change	197,217	7.01
Total		2,813,830	100.00
Total votes		2,813,830	–
Registered voters/turnout		4,539,835	61.98
Source: National Electoral Commission

==== Legislative Assembly ====
Party	Votes	%	Seats
Sudan People's Liberation Movement			161
Sudan People's Liberation Movement–Democratic Change			1
National Congress Party			1
Independents			7
Total			170
Registered voters/turnout	4,539,835	–	
Source: National Electoral Commission

== Conduct ==
Election observers from the Cordoba Initiative said the election, as a whole, could not have been called a failure. Although the group did say that "This election satisfied many purposes and was what can be expected from a country that hosts elections for the first time in such a long while." Western observers, from the EU and the Carter Centre, criticised the polls as "not meeting international standards". However, former US President Jimmy Carter made it clear the "international community" would recognise the winners.

== See also ==
- 2010 Sudanese general election in Jonglei
- 2010 Sudanese gubernatorial elections
- 2010 Darfurian amalgamation referendum
- 2011 Southern Sudanese independence referendum
