= Popular Congress Party =

Popular Congress Party حزب المؤتمر الشعبي
- Leader: Ibrahim El Sanousi
- Founded: 1999; 27 years ago
- Split from: National Congress Party
- Headquarters: Khartoum
- Newspaper: Ray al-Shaab
- Ideology: Sunni Islamism
- Political position: Right-wing
- Religion: Sunni Islam
- National affiliation: National Consensus Forces (NCF)
- National Assembly: 0 / 426

Website
- popularcongress.org

The Popular Congress Party (PCP, Arabic: حزب المؤتمر الشعبي) is an Islamist political party in Sudan. The party was founded by Hassan al-Turabi.

The party emerged from a split within the ruling National Congress Party (NCP) in 1999, due to differences between Turabi and President Omar al-Bashir. The party is one of the most outspoken against the NCP, advocating a popular uprising to overthrow the government. The party relies heavily on displaced Western Sudanese living in Khartoum's shanty towns for support.

The party is a member of the National Consensus Forces opposition alliance.

== History ==
Al-Turabi had a falling out with al-Bashir in 1999, when al-Turabi again began to spend time in jail or under house arrest. The power struggle between al-Bashir and al-Turabi resulted in al-Turabi’s expulsion from the NCP. As a consequence, al-Turabi established the PCP (initially called the Popular National Congress) in August 2000 in opposition to the NCP.

After al-Turabi created the PCP, al-Bashir’s security forces regularly harassed its meetings and arrested participants. In February 2001, the PCP signed a "memorandum of understanding" in Geneva with the Sudan People's Liberation Movement. Among other things, the memorandum noted that self-determination is a legitimate right of the people of South Sudan. Al-Turabi saw the memorandum as a way to undermine al-Bashir and improve his own position; it resulted in al-Turabi’s arrest. After three months in prison, the government released al-Turabi from prison and put him under house arrest. PCP activity virtually came to a halt; al-Bashir dropped charges against PCP supporters near the end of 2001. Released from detention, al-Turabi was rearrested in March 2003 on charges of masterminding a coup attempt. The government dismissed these charges against al-Turabi and the PCP in December 2004 but continued to keep him in detention and banned party activity. Al-Turabi managed, however, to have a significant impact on political developments in Sudan from jail or house arrest and eventually was released. There is strong evidence that the PCP established an alliance with the rebel Justice and Equality Movement in Darfur in order to put additional pressure on the government. In the flawed April 2010 elections, the PCP candidate for president, Abdullah Deng Nhial, a Muslim from the Dinka tribe, received only 4 percent of the vote.

The party newspaper, Ray al-Shaab, has been banned since 2012.
