= 2020 in North Africa =

The following lists events that happened during 2020 in North Africa. The countries listed are those described in the United Nations geoscheme for Africa: Algeria, Egypt, Libya, Morocco, Sahrawi Arab Democratic Republic, Sudan, Tunisia, and Western Sahara

== Countries and territories ==
=== Algeria ===
The People's Democratic Republic of Algeria won its independence from France in 1962. It is a member of the African Union (AU), the Arab League, OPEC, and the Arab Maghreb Union (AMU). The capital of Algeria is Algiers.

- Chief of state and head of government: President: Abdelmadjid Tebboune (since December 12, 2019)

=== Egypt ===
Modern Egypt gained nominal independence from the British Empire as a monarchy in 1922. In 1952, Egypt ended British occupation, nationalized the Suez Canal, exiled King Farouk, and declared itself a republic. Egypt and Syria formed the United Arab Republic from 1958 to 1961. Egypt is a member the Non-Aligned Movement (NAM), the Arab League, the African Union, and the Organisation of Islamic Cooperation (OIC) The capital of the Arab Republic of Egypt is Cairo.

- Chief of state: President of Egypt: Abdel Fattah el-Sisi (since June 8, 2014)
- Head of government: Prime Minister of Egypt: Moustafa Madbouly (since June, 2018)

=== Libya ===
The Kingdom of Libya lasted from 1951 to September 1, 1969, when Muammar Gaddafi overthrew King Idris and established the "Libyan Arab Republic," becoming the "Socialist People's Libyan Arab Jamahiriya" in 1977 and the "Great Socialist People's Libyan Arab Jamahiriya" in 1986. Gaddafi himself was killed during the Libyan Civil War of 2011. Libya is a member of the NAM, the Arab League, the OIC, and the OPEC. The capital of the State of Libya is Tripoli.

- Chief of state: Chairman of the Presidential Council and Prime Minister: Fayez al-Sarraj (since December 2015)
  - Vice President of the Presidential Council and Deputy Prime Minister: Ahmed Maiteeq (since March 30, 2016)

=== Morocco ===
The Alaouite dynasty began its rule in 1631 but in 1912 Morocco was divided between French and Spanish protectorates. The Kingdom of Morocco regained its independence in 1956. Morocco is a member of the Arab League, the Union for the Mediterranean (UfM), and the AU. Rabat is the capital city.

- Chief of state: King: Mohammed VI (since July 30, 1999)
- Head of government: President of the Government: Saadeddine Othmani (since March 17, 2017)

==== Western Sahara ====
When Spain gave up Spanish Sahara in 1976, Morocco, Mauritania, and Polisario Front fought for control of the territory. Mauritania gave up its claims in 1979. Today the government of Morocco claims sovereignty and controls 3/4 of the territory of Western Sahara, which it calls its Southern Provinces (Note: Morocco's rule over the Western Sahara is not officially recognized by any country, but Morocco has the support of the Arab League.) The United Nations proposed a referendum on the area's future; Morocco agreed to autonomy in 2007 but no referendum. The largest city is Laayoune.

=== Sahrawi Arab Democratic Republic ===
The Sahrawi Arab Democratic Republic (SADR) controls about 1/4 of the territory of Western Sahara and is recognized by about 40 countries. It is a member of the African Union. The SADR claims El Aaiún as its capital, but as that is controlled by Morocco, Tifariti in the Liberated Territories east of the Moroccan Western Sahara Wall is the de facto capital.

- President: Brahim Ghali (since July 12, 2016)
- Prime Minister: Mohamed Wali Akeik (since February 4, 2018)

=== Sudan ===
Anglo-Egyptian Sudan was established in 1899, granting Sudan independence on January 1, 1956. Mostly Christian South Sudan broke off from the Muslim Republic of the Sudan in 2011. President Omar al-Bashir was overthrown in April 2019 and by August 20, 2019 the Sovereignty Council of Sudan was established. The 2022 Sudanese general election is scheduled to complete the transition to democracy by November 2022. Khartoum is the capital.

- Chief of state and head of government: vacant (Note: In August 2019, the ruling military council and civilian opposition alliance signed a power-sharing deal as the "Sovereignty Council," chaired by General Abd-al-Fatah al-Burhan and consisting of six civilians and five generals; the Council is currently led by the military but the intention is to transition to civilian leadership in May 2021 when elections can be held; Burhan serves as both chief of state and head of government.)
- Chairman of the Sovereignty Council of Sudan: Abdel Fattah al-Burhan (since August 21, 2019)
- Prime Minister: Abdalla Hamdok (since August 21, 2019) (Note: On 21 August 21, 2019, the Forces for Freedom and Change, the civilian opposition alliance, named Abdallah Handouk as prime minister of Sudan for the transitional period.)

=== Tunisia ===
Tunisia threw off its French yoke on March 20, 1956, and the Republic of Tunisia was declared the following year. The Tunisian Revolution of December 2010-January 2011 set off the Arab Spring and led to the democratization of Tunisia. The capital and largest city is Tunis.

- Chief of state: President: Kais Saied (since October 23, 2019)
- Head of government:
- Prime Minister
  - Youssef Chahed (August 27, 2016 – February 27, 2020)
  - Elyes Fakhfakh (February 27, 2020 – September 2, 2020)
  - Hichem Mechichi (since September 2, 2020)
- President of the Assembly of the Representatives by the People: Rached Ghannouchi (since November 13, 2019)

== Monthly events ==
=== January ===
- January 1
  - New Year's Day
  - Independence Day, Sudan
- January 5 – Turkey starts to deploy troops in Libya.
- January 6 – Epiphany, Christian "Feast of the Maji"
- January 7
  - Coptic Christmas, Egypt and Sudan
  - Rebel groups commanded by Khalifa Haftar capture the coastal city of Sirte, Libya.
- January 8 – Turkish President Erdogan and Russian President Vladimir Putin call for a cease-fire in Libya.
- January 14 – Revolution and Youth Day, Tunisia and Sudan
- January 24 – Several organizations in Ecuador express their support for the rights of the Sahrawi people.
- January 25 – Egyptian revolution of 2011 and National Police Day (Egypt)
- January 28: Human Rights Watch denounces the arrests of dozens of peaceful dissidents in since the 2019 Algerian presidential election on December 12, 2019.
- January 31: A 12-year-old girl dies during genital mutilation surgery in Egypt.

=== February ===
- February 1 – The Grand Mufti of Egypt is to rule on the legality of 37 death sentences for terrorism.
- February 3:
  - Tunisian President Kais Saied visits Algeria in his first trip outside the country.
  - Daesh claims responsibility for a gas pipeline explosion in the Sinai Peninsula.
- February 9 – Sudanese leader Abdel Fattah Abdelrahman Burhan meets with Prime Minister Benjamin Netanyahu of Israel. Former deputy Prime Minister Mubarak al Fadil al Mahdi of Sudan states that it would be good to normalize relations with Israel.
- February 11
  - The government of Sudan agrees that former president Omar al-Bashir will face war crime charges before the International Criminal Court (ICC), where he is accused of 300,000 deaths in Darfur.
  - The Egyptian population reaches 100 million.
  - The African Union reaffirms its support for self-determination for the Sahrawi Arab Democratic Republic.
- February 13 – Sudan says it has reached a settlement in the USS Cole bombing, a first step in being removed from the designation as a state supporter of terrorism.
- February 14 – Thousands of Algerians march against corruption and military participation in politics.
- February 17
  - Revolution Day, Libya
  - Morocco tightens its control over the Spanish cities of Ceuta and Melilla.
- February 26 – Spain calls for a firm defense of its territorial claims for the Canary Islands in a dispute with Morocco over mineral rights off the coast of Western Sahara.
- February 29 – Egypt says it will use "all means" to defend its interests in a dispute with Ethiopia and Sudan over a dam on the Nile River.

=== March ===
- March 2 – Independence Day, Morocco (1956 from France)
- March 8 – International Women's Day
- March 12 – At least 18 African countries, including Algeria, Egypt, Morocco, and Tunisia report cases of the novel coronavirus. Most are in single figures, but five deaths have been reported in North Africa.
- March 20 – Independence Day, Tunisia (1956 from France)
- March 22 – Isra and Mi'raj, Islamic "Night Journey"

=== April ===
- April 3
  - Humanitarian groups call upon the government of Morocco to give African migrants the same cash aid it gives to citizens.
  - Sudan and the United States finalize the settlement of the 2000 USS Cole bombing. The announcement maintained Sudan's position that it was not responsible for the attack on the ship or any other "terrorist" act.
- April 9 – Martyrs' Day, Sudan
- April 13 – 14,000 cases of COVID-19 and 788 deaths have been reported across Africa. Cases by country: Algeria – 1,914, Egypt – 2,065, Libya – 25, Morocco – 1,661, Sudan – 19, Tunisia – 707
- April 22 – Sudan reports 13 deaths and 140 confirmed cases of COVID-19, but there are fears that the actual number is much higher as people only go to the hospital when they are very sick. The government has increased its health budget by 200%, but $120 million to fight the new virus and $150 million to cover medicines until June is still needed. Importing equipment and medicine is difficult as suppliers prioritize their own countries.
- April 23 to 23 May 23 – Ramadan
- April 25 – Sinai Liberation Day, Egypt
- April 28 – Libyan General Khalifa Haftar is accused of carrying out a coup d'état as he puts the eastern part of the country under direct military rule.
- April 29 – Representatives from the United Arab Emirates (UAE) visit Sudan to rally support and recruit fighters for Libya's Khalifa Haftar.
- April 30
  - Sudan criminalizes female genital mutilation.
  - Ten Egyptian soldiers, including an army officer, died in a bomb attack in Bir al-Abd, North Sinai Governorate. It is suspected this attack was carried out by Islamic State although no one immediately claimed responsibility.

=== May ===
- May 1
  - Labour Day in Algeria, Egypt, and Tunisia. International Workers' Day in Libya and Morocco.
  - Two civilians are killed when eastern forces under the command of Khalifa Hifter bomb Tripoli, Libya.
- May 4 – Seventy-eight migrants from Libya are stuck at sea as no European port will accept them.
- May 6 – Fighting between Arabs and non-Arabs in South Darfur, Sudan, leaves thirty dead and a dozen wounded.
- May 8 – A Moroccan man is arrested in Spain for allegedly planning a pro-Islamic State terrorist attack in Barcelona.
- May 12 – Sudan pushes Ethiopia to resume discussion related to the $4.6 billion Grand Ethiopian Renaissance Dam on the Nile River that officials say will start filling in July.
- May 13 – In the third incident of armed violence this month, 24 people, including paratroopers are killed in Kaduqli, Sudan.
- May 14 – Algeria summons Morocco's ambassador to Algiers in protest when the Moroccan consul in Oran purportedly referred to Algeria as an "enemy country."
- May 19 – Laylat al-Qadr, Islamic "Night of Decree"
- May 23
  - Egyptian security forces report killing 21 militants in two raids in the northern Sinai Peninsula; two Egyptian soldiers are wounded.
  - COVID-19 pandemic: Sudan announces the formation of a special police force to prevent attacks on health workers. The country has reported at least 63 deaths from COVID-19 among around 3,380 confirmed cases of the coronavirus. There have been two dozen attacks on health workers over the past two months.
- May 24 – Eid al-Fitr, end of Ramadan
- May 26 – The U.S. says Russia has sent fighter jets to Tripoli to support the mercenaries trying to topple the government. Russia says this is ″disinformation.″
- May 27 – Five British men and one woman are accused of being among 30 mercenaries fighting for Libyan rebel Khalifa Haftar on behalf of the United Arab Emirates (UAE) based company called Opus.
- May 30 – Day of the Canary Islands

=== June ===
- June 2 – Sudan appoints Maj. Gen. Yassin Ibrahim Yassin as its new Defense Minister.
- June 3
  - The internationally recognized government of Libya retakes Tripoli International Airport. Egypt and the UAE, both backers of military commander Khalifa Haftar, support the ceasefire announced on June 2.
  - Sudanese remember the June 3, 2019, coup d'état and crackdown that resulted in dozens of rapes and at least 87 deaths.
- June 9 – Sudanese militia leader Ali Kushayb, is arrested and charged with 50 crimes against humanity and war crimes in the War in Darfur.
- June 11 – Tunisia lifts COVID-19 shutdown.
- June 17 to 20 – Egyptian hackers engage in cyberattacks against Ethiopia's security forces.
- June 26 – Egypt, Sudan, and Ethiopia agree to delay filling the Grand Ethiopian Renaissance Dam (GERD).
- June 27 – Egypt executes Libyan militant Abdel-Rahim al-Mosmari, convicted of plotting an attack that killed at least 16 police officers in October 2017.
- June 30 – 30 June Day, Egypt

=== July ===
- July 5 – Independence Day, Algeria (from France in 1962)
- July 6 – Mohamed Amashah, 24, an Egyptian-American student, is released from Tora Prison in Cairo after 16 months of captivity.
- July 11 – Sudan institutes reforms allowing non-Muslims to drink alcohol in private and outlawing Female Genital Mutilation (FGM).
- July 13 – Sudanese security forces violently break up a protest camp in North Darfur, killing at least protester and wounding a dozen others, including four children, activists.
- July 20 – The Parliament of Egypt authorizes sending troops to Libya.
- July 23 – Revolution Day, Egypt
- July 24 – Mass graves likely tied to a 1990 coup attempt against former President Omar al-Bashir in Sudan are discovered.
- July 25 – Republic Day, Sudan
- July 30
  - Muharram, Islamic New Year
  - Throne Day (accession of King Mohammed VI to the throne in Morocco)
- July 31 – Eid al-Adha, Islamic "Festival of the Sacrifice"

=== August ===
- August 11 – Sudan bans the exportation of peanuts.
- August 12 – France steps up its military presence in the eastern Mediterranean.
- August 14 – Oued Ed-Dahab Day, Western Sahara
- August 17 – Forty-five migrants, including children, die when the boat carrying them explodes near Zuwarah, Libya. Thirty-seven people survive.
- August 24 – General Abdel Fattah al-Burhan defends the upcoming visit of U.S. Secretary of State Mike Pompeo, who is expected to remove Sudan from the state sponsors of terrorism.
- August 25 – Prime Minister Abiy Ahmed of Ethiopia meets Sudanese Prime Minister Abdalla Hamdok of Sudan and General Abdelfatah al Burhan in Khartoum to discuss the Grand Ethiopian Renaissance Dam (GERD) and border issues.
- August 31 – The transitional government of Sudan and the Sudan Revolutionary Front initial a peace agreement in South Sudan.
- August – 2020 Sudan floods

=== September ===
- September 2 – Ceuta Day
- September 6 – The Red Cross says that 332 migrants rescued by Salvamento Marítimo have to stay in tents on the docks in Arguineguín, Grand Canary Island.
- September 15 – The Canary Islands report the arrival of 1,277 immigrants in two weeks, the highest figure since 2008.
- September 16 – Martyrs' Day, Libya
- September 17
  - Melilla Day
  - Filmmaker Hajooj Kuka is among the five Sudanaese artists convicted on charges of public disturbance and violating public safety measures in Khartoum in a demonstration against dictator Omar al-Bashir in 2019. Six others are awaiting similar charges.

=== October ===
- October 3 – The government of Sudan and ten rebel groups sign a peace agreement, ending 17 years of war.
- October 12 – Fiesta Nacional de España, Spain and dependencies
- October 15 – Evacuation Day, Sudan
- October 23 – Liberation Day, Libya (2011)
- October 30 – Milad un Nabi, The Prophet's birthday

=== November ===
- November 1 – Revolution Day, Algeria (1954)
- November 3 – Milad un Nabi, The Prophet's birthday (Shia)
- November 6 – Green March, Western Sahara, Morocco
- November 8 – 2020 Egyptian parliamentary election
- November 15 – A 30-year cease-fire between Morocco and Polisario Front forces is broken as the government tries to open a road in the Guerguerat buffer zone near the border with Mauritania.
- November 18 – Independence Day, Morocco

=== December ===
- December 11 – Morocco normalizes relations with Israel and in return U.S. President Trump acknowledges Morocco's sovereignty over the Western Sahara.
- December 15 – Sudan says that "Ethiopian forces and militias" ambushed Sudanese army forces near Jabal Abutiour, Sudan. Sudane Prime Minister Abdalla Hamdok visited Ethiopia briefly on December 13 to discuss the security situation.
- December 16 – Couscous is added to the UNESCO Intangible Cultural Heritage Lists.
- December 19 – Revolution Day, Sudan
- December 24 – Independence Day, Libya
- December 25 – Christmas Day, Western Christian holiday
- December 27 – Egyptian diplomats and intelligence operatives arrive in Tripoli to discuss security concerns.

== Sports ==
=== November 2019 to December 2020 ===
- November 29, 2019 – 1 February 1, 2020: 2019–20 CAF Champions League group stage
- December 1, 2019 – 2 February 2, 2020: 2019–20 CAF Confederation Cup group stage
- January 7 – 11: Volleyball at the 2020 Summer Olympics – Men's African qualification, Cairo, Egypt
- January 16 – January 26: 2020 African Men's Handball Championship: Egypt won their seventh title by defeating Tunisia 27–23 in the final.
- 17 January – 21 June 2020: 2020 African U-20 Women's World Cup Qualifying Tournament
- January 23 – 31: African Para Games in Cairo, Egypt
- January 28 – February 7: 2020 Africa Futsal Cup of Nations: Morocco was the defending champion and successfully managed to defend their title after beating Egypt 5–0 in the final.
- February 8 to 9 – 2020 African Wrestling Championships, Algiers, Algeria
- February 9 – 1,200 runners participate in half-Marathon (21 kilometers) in Djerba, Tunisia.
- February 10 and 13 – 2020 All Africa Men's and Women's Team Badminton Championships, Cairo
- February 10 and 16 – 2020 Zed Tennis Open, Cairo
- February 14 to 16 – 2020 African Badminton Championships, Cairo
- February 17 and 23 – 2020 Zed Tennis Open II
- February 22 to February 23: 2020 African Taekwondo Olympic Qualification Tournament, Rabat, Morocco
- February 29 – 2020 Marrakesh ePrix, Marrakesh, Morocco
- April 18 – 2020 Arab Club Champions Cup Final, Rabat
- May TBA – Finals of 2020 African U-17 Women's World Cup Qualifying Tournament Began January 2020
- June 21 – Finals of 2020 African U-20 Women's World Cup Qualifying Tournament
- October 5 to 12 – 2022 FIFA World Cup qualification – CAF second round

== Deaths ==
=== January to March ===
- January 2 - Mohamed Salah Dembri, 81, Algerian politician, Minister of Foreign Affairs (1993–1996).
- January 7 – Abderrazak Rassaa, Tunisian politician (b. 1930).
- January 16 – Magda al-Sabahi, 88, Egyptian actress
- January 17
  - Ibrahim Farah, 68, Egyptian actor.
  - Nadia Rafik, 84, Egyptian actress.
- January 21 – Hédi Baccouche, Tunisian politician (b. 1930).
- January 27 – Lina Ben Mhenni, 36, Tunisian political activist and blogger (b. 1983).
- January 30 – Muhammad Abu Khubza, 87, Moroccan theologian and linguist.
- February 7 – Lenin El-Ramly, 75, Egyptian screenwriter (The Terrorist).
- February 9 – Abdel Aziz El Mubarak, 69, Sudanese singer, pneumonia.
- February 10 – Saïd Amara, 75, Tunisian handball player and coach (Espérance Sportive de Tunis, National Team).
- February 20 – Mohammed Abaamran, 87, Moroccan actor and singer.
- February 25 – Hosni Mubarak, 91, Egyptian military officer and politician, President (1981–2011), Prime Minister (1981–1982) and Vice-President (1975–1981).
- February 28 – Muhammad Imara, 88, Egyptian Islamic scholar
- March 4 – Hesham Ashmawy, 41–42, Egyptian convicted terrorist; execution by hanging
- March 9 – Alain Marcel, 68, Algerian-born French actor and music composer.
- March 25 – Jamal Aldin Omar, 60, Sudanese Defence Minister.
- March 27 – Hamed Karoui, 92, Tunisian politician, Prime Minister (1989–1999) and Minister of Justice (1988–1989)
- March 28 – George Sidhom, 81, Egyptian comedian and actor
- March 31 – Pierre Bénichou, 82, Algerian-born French journalist

=== April to June ===
- April 1 – Mahmoud Zakzouk, 86, Egyptian academic and politician, Minister of Awqaf (1995–2011)
- April 4 – *Leïla Menchari, 92–93, Tunisian decorator and designer (Hermès).
- April 5 – Mahmoud Jibril, 67, Libyan politician, Minister of Foreign Affairs and Prime Minister (2011); COVID-19
- April 9 – Clément-Joseph Hannouche, 70, Egyptian Syriac Catholic hierarch, Bishop of Cairo (since 1995).
- April 21 – Abdurrahim El-Keib, 70, Libyan politician, acting Prime Minister (2011–2012); heart attack
- May 2 – Shady Habash, 24, Egyptian media producer and political prisoner
- May 22 – Adam Henein, 91, Egyptian sculptor
- June 11 – Mahjoub Ben Bella, 73, Algerian-born French painter.
- June 17 – Magda Kandil, 62, Egyptian economist.
- June 27 – Belaid Abdessalam, 91, politician, Algerian Prime Minister (1992-1993)

=== July to September ===
- August 21 – Mohamed Gueddiche, 78, Tunisian cardiologist, presidential doctor.

=== October to December ===
- November 26 – Sadiq al-Mahdi, 84, Sudanese politician and religious leader, Prime Minister of Sudan (1966–1967, 1986–1989); COVID-19.
- December 1 – Henri Teissier, 91, French-Algerian Roman Catholic prelate, Archbishop of Roman Catholic Archdiocese of Algiers (1988–2008); stroke.

== See also ==
- COVID-19 pandemic in Africa
- 2020 Sudan floods
- 2020 in East Africa
- 2020 in Middle Africa
- 2020 in Southern Africa
- 2020 in West Africa
- 2020 in politics and government
- 2020s
- 2020s in political history
- Grand Ethiopian Renaissance Dam
- African Union
- Arab League
- Community of Sahel–Saharan States
- List of sovereign states and dependent territories in Africa
- United Nations geoscheme
- List of George Floyd protests outside the United States
