= 2023 in Sudan =

- Decades: 2000s; 2010s; 2020s
- See also: Other events of 2023; History of Sudan

The following lists events during 2023 in the Republic of the Sudan.

== Incumbents ==
- Chairman of the Transitional Sovereignty Council: Abdel Fattah al-Burhan
- Deputy Chairman of the Sovereignty Council:
1. Mohamed Hamdan Dagalo
2. Malik Agar
- Prime Minister: Osman Hussein (acting)

== Events ==
=== March ===
- 30 March: Fourteen people are killed and dozens of others are injured by a mine collapse in Northern state.

=== April ===
- 13 April: The Sudanese government warns of a possible conflict after the Rapid Support Forces (RSF) paramilitary group mobilizes in several Sudanese cities.
- 15 April:
  - Fighting breaks out across Sudan, mostly in Khartoum where a large battle emerges. three days after the paramilitary RSF mobilized. The RSF claims to have captured Khartoum International Airport, and the presidential palace in Khartoum.
  - Chad closes its border with Sudan as heavy fighting continues between the Sudanese military and rebel forces.
  - Saudi Arabia, Egypt, the United Arab Emirates, Libya and Qatar suspend all planes from inside and outside of Sudan due to the ongoing conflicts and closure of several airports; airlines also fear attacks on their planes mainly in Khartoum. Some planes have already been destroyed.
- 16 April: The Sudanese military is said to have retaken control of the presidential palace and other key government installations in Khartoum. The military says Khartoum International Airport remains under the control of RSF, but that it was holding back from launching airstrikes to avoid destroying the airport.
- 17 April:
  - European Union ambassador Aidan O'Hara is assaulted at his home in Khartoum. EU Foreign Affairs High Representative Josep Borrell calls the assault a "gross violation of the Vienna Convention".
  - A Japanese citizen becomes the second foreign death during the Battle of Khartoum.
  - Sudan closes its airspace, cancelling all flights in and out of the country. Kenya likewise suspends all flights to and from Sudan.
  - China, Malaysia, and the United States urge their citizens in Sudan to hide, find shelter, or evacuate the country.
  - De facto leader Abdel Fattah al-Burhan declares the RSF to be a rebel group, and orders the group dissolved.
- 18 April:
  - A US convoy is deliberately attacked in Khartoum, hours after the US ordered a ceasefire be put to end the conflict.
  - India instruct its citizens to find shelter or stay indoors immediately.
  - Canada closes its embassy in Sudan fully, advises its citizens to not leave the country for Sudan and puts a Level 4 warning on travel.
- 19 April:
  - Japanese Chief Cabinet Secretary Hirokazu Matsuno says that Japan will send a Self-Defense Forces aircraft to evacuate 60 Japanese nationals from Sudan.
  - Germany and Japan announce their evacuation plans have failed in Khartoum as both tried to evacuate at least 210 civilians and citizens from the embattled capital.
    - Germany later announces the suspension of its attempt to rescue 150 German citizens from Khartoum.
  - The United Kingdom, Germany and Japan urge their citizens to seek shelter, hide or evacuate immediately as fighting rages in Sudan.
  - Egypt announces one of its planes, an "Egyptian MiG-29", was destroyed at an air base in Merowe. It also reports that one of them was captured along with two planes nearly destroyed.
  - The Libyan National Army sends supplies to support the RSF across the country.
- 20 April:
  - A food shortage is reported in Khartoum after several people raid stores and take several supplies, including most of the foods.
  - An American citizen is killed in Khartoum becoming the second confirmed foreign death, hours after evacuation plans were announced by the United States.
  - The United States sends additional troops and equipment to Camp Lemonnier in Djibouti, as preparation for a possible evacuation effort of American citizens in Sudan.
- 21 April:
  - Indonesia evacuates 43 of its citizens to its embassy in Khartoum after an Indonesian citizen is injured by a bullet.
  - The Belgian head of the EU humanitarian mission to Sudan, Wim Fransen, is shot in Khartoum.
  - Many countries, including South Korea, Spain, Sweden, and Switzerland, announce plans to evacuate all of their citizens or nationals from Sudan.
- 22 April: France and Saudi Arabia announce that they will evacuate their citizens from Sudan, joining the United States and the United Kingdom in doing so.
- 23 April:
  - The Department of Foreign Affairs of the Philippines announces the suspension of all flights to Sudan to ensure the safety of its citizens and raises alerts to level 3 after a Filipino is hit by a stray bullet in Khartoum.
  - Syria suspends all of its flights to Sudan, following the deaths of 11 Syrians in the country.
  - Many countries, including the United Kingdom, Germany, Spain, and Canada, evacuate their nationals and some civilians from Khartoum, or announce plans to do so.
  - Canada and the United States suspend all diplomatic operations in Sudan due to the ongoing conflict.
  - Sudan reports a large internet outage across the entire country during the night.
  - Thousands of Sudanese refugees are reported to have entered South Sudan and Egypt.
- 24 April:
  - Switzerland suspends all diplomatic operations in its Khartoum embassy.
  - Brazil, South Africa, Niger and Mexico evacuate more than 100 citizens from Sudan.
- 25 April: The United Kingdom begins a large-scale evacuation of British citizens from Sudan.
- 29 April:
  - Warplanes bomb Khartoum and heavy anti-aircraft artillery is heard in the city as the conflict enters its third week, with the United Nations warning that Sudan is "collapsing".
  - A Turkish evacuation plane is fired at in Khartoum, allegedly by the RSF. No injuries or deaths have been confirmed.
  - The former Prime Minister of Sudan, Abdalla Hamdok, calls the conflict in his country a "nightmare", stating that it could become worse than those in Syria and Libya.
- 30 April: Iran evacuates 65 nationals from Sudan with Saudi Arabian assistance.

=== May ===
- 2 May:
  - Battle of Geneina: RSF re-capture Geneina, the capital of West Darfur, after a week of fighting with more than 200 people killed.
  - Start of the Sudanese refugee crisis: The number of Sudanese refugees due to the ongoing civil conflict surpasses 100,000 after only a few days.
- 3 May: The South Sudanese foreign ministry announces that a seven-day ceasefire has been agreed to, lasting from 4 to 11 May.
- 13 May: Ethiopia reports large numbers of Sudanese refugees entering its territory, mainly in the city of Metemma, where nearly 20,000 Sudanese are reported to have entered in a single day.
- 17 May: The United Nations announces a 3 billion dollar plan for the humanitarian and refugee crisis in the country.

=== June ===
- 14 June: Killing of Khamis Abakar: The state governor of West Darfur, Khamis Abakar, is killed in Geneina after being abducted by armed men shortly after accusing the RSF of committing genocide in the state. The RSF denies killing Abakar, blaming "outlaws" for his death.
- 17 June: The Sudanese Air Force launches airstrikes in Khartoum, killing at least 17 people and destroying dozens of homes. The SAF and the RSF agree to a 72-hour ceasefire.
- 26 June:
  - The RSF take control of the main police base in Khartoum, seizing a large amount of military equipment and ammunition, including 160 pickup trucks, 75 armoured personnel carriers, and 27 tanks.
  - The Sudan People's Liberation Movement–North attacks the town of Kurmuk in Blue Nile, Sudan, prompting hundreds of civilians to flee across the border to Ethiopia.
- 28 June: Airstrikes are reported in the Sudanese capital Khartoum, while heavy fighting takes place in Omdurman despite a ceasefire declared by both sides for the Islamic holiday Eid al-Adha.

=== July ===
- 8 July – Battle of Omdurman: At least 22 people are killed by an airstrike in Omdurman, Sudan.
- 13 July – The United Nations reports the discovery of a mass grave in West Darfur, Sudan, believed to contain at least 87 individuals, including women and children, reportedly killed by the RSF and an affiliated Arab militia.
- 21 July – 15 civilians and 19 SAF officers are killed in a drone attack in Khartoum.

=== August ===
- 1 August – Protests begin in Kadugli, South Kordofan against the clashes which are ongoing within the city, also denouncing the war and the violations against women.
- 4 August –
  - Battle of Geneina: Clashes in and around the city of Geneina, Sudan, cause at least 460 deaths and more than 1,000 injuries and result in the Sirba locality being captured by the RSF.
  - Authorities in the Sudanese state of North Kordofan announce a state-wide curfew.
- 6 August – Siege of Zalingei: The RSF claim the state of Central Darfur, after capturing the capital of Zalingei from the SAF.
- 8 August – Clashes occur in the Abrof neighborhood of Omdurman, Khartoum, between the RSF and the Sudanese Armed Forces (SAF).
- 15 August – Battle of Nyala:
  - Clashes begin again in Nyala, with at least 43 people confirmed dead along with dozens injured.
  - A shootout along with shelling begins south of Nyala at El Wahda Hospital causing 3 deaths and 30 wounded.
- 16 August – Battle of Geneina:
  - Geneina massacre: More than 1,000 bodies are discovered in 30 mass graves within the RSF-occupied city of Geneina in West Darfur by civil leaders.
  - The number of people who have fled Sudan since April reaches 1.0 million while nearly 3.5 million have been displaced.
- 28 August – Head of the RSF Mohamed Hamdan Dagalo publishes a 10-point plan that proposes a non-symmetrical federal system and a new apolitical SAF.

=== September ===
- 1 September – Siege of El Obeid: SAF capture El Obeid, pushing the RSF out of the city, although skirmishes continue on the outskirts of the city.
- 3 September – Five civilians are killed in airstrikes by the SAF in Khartoum, a continuation of bombings that killed twenty civilians yesterday.
- 10 September – September 2023 Khartoum airstrike: At least 43 people are killed and dozens more are injured by an airstrike in Khartoum.
- 13 September – Geneina massacre: Thirteen new mass graves are found in Geneina by the United Nations, with an unspecified number of people.
- 18 September – In Khartoum, the Greater Nile Petroleum Oil Company Tower burns down.
- 23 September – The Sudan Liberation Movement (al-Nur) took control of the town of Tawila after the army and the RSF had withdrawn.

=== October ===
- 28 October – The RSF capture Nyala and the rest of South Darfur, marking a strategic victory for the RSF.

=== November ===
- 3 November – El Hadi Idriss, a member of the Sudan Liberation Movement - Transitional Council, is fired from the ruling Transitional Sovereignty Council of Sudan for unknown reasons.
- 4 November –
  - At least 15 civilians are killed in Khartoum during a shelling between the SAF and the RSF.
  - Battle of Geneina: The RSF capture Geneina, capital of West Darfur state, after seizing control of the headquarters of the Sudanese military's 15th Infantry Division in the city.
- 5 November – At least 20 people are killed by shells that hit a marketplace in Khartoum.
- 8 November –
  - The RSF capture the SAF base in Um Keddada, North Darfur, after the SAF withdraws.
  - At least 2,000 people are killed and 3,000 are injured when the RSF massacres civilians in Ardamata, West Darfur, following the SAF's withdrawal from the town.
  - Experts and activists warn that the entirety of Darfur is close to being seized by the RSF, with North Darfur remaining the last state in the region under government control.
- 10 November – Between 700 and 1,300 people are killed, over one hundred are injured and around 300 are missing after clashes in Geneina.
- 11 November – The Shambat Bridge, which connects Omdurman and Khartoum North, is destroyed amid intense fighting in the capital Khartoum. Both sides blame each other for the destruction of the bridge.
- 12 November –
  - The death toll from clashes in Geneina increases to 1,300 people, with more than 2,000 injured. The UNHCR also confirms that around 8,000 people have fled to Chad from Geneina in the past week.
  - Heavy fighting is reported in Jabal Awliya, south of Khartoum, as the RSF attempt to capture the Jebel Aulia Dam.
- 15 November –
  - Fighting continues in Jabal Awliya, south of Khartoum, with local sources claiming that the RSF took control of the Al Najumi air base and a road connecting the city to White Nile State.
  - Violence between rival tribes in South Darfur kills at least 30 people over three days of clashes.
- 16 November – The Sudan Liberation Movement, the Justice and Equality Movement and other smaller rebel factions declare war on the RSF, having previously remained neutral in the conflict.
- 18 November – The Jebel Aulia Bridge, part of the Jebel Aulia Dam complex, is destroyed amid heavy fighting in Jabal Awliya. A Sudanese official says the dam itself remains intact. It is the second bridge in Khartoum destroyed in a week.
- 19 November – At least 32 people are killed and 20 others are injured in a mass shooting against two villages in Abyei, an area that is disputed between Sudan and South Sudan.
- 20 November –
  - The RSF announce that it has captured the Jebel Aulia Dam.
  - The RSF launch an assault on Ed Daein, the capital of East Darfur, capturing the city's airport, as the group attempts to seize the headquarters of the SAF 20th Infantry Division.

=== December ===
- 1 December – The UNSC adopts a resolution to end the mandate of its United Nations Integrated Transition Assistance Mission in Sudan (UNITAMS) by December 3.
- 6 December – U.S. Secretary of State Antony Blinken accuses both sides of the conflict of committing war crimes during the war, including crimes against humanity and ethnic cleansing.
- 10 December –
  - Two people are killed and seven others are wounded in an attack on a Red Cross humanitarian aid convoy in Khartoum.
  - Abdel Fattah al-Burhan and Hemedti agree to meet in person before the end of the year to end the war between the Rapid Support Forces and the Sudanese Armed Forces in Sudan.
- 11 December – The Sudanese Ministry of Foreign Affairs declares fifteen Emirati diplomats personae non gratae over the UAE's support of the Rapid Support Forces.
- 17 December – The Sudanese Armed Forces says that it has repelled a Rapid Support Forces (RSF) assault on Wad Madani, the capital of Gezira State. The RSF reportedly withdraws following heavy resistance.
- 18 December –
  - The Rapid Support Forces launch a second assault and capture Wad Madani, the capital of Gezira State, after being repelled by the Sudanese Armed Forces yesterday.
  - The Rapid Support Forces captures the city of Rufaa, north of Wad Madani.
  - According to the International Organization for Migration, at least 250,000 people have fled Gezira State since the start of hostilities in the region.
- 22 December – De facto Sudanese leader Abdel Fattah al-Burhan announces he will meet with Rapid Support Forces leader Hemedti. The announcement comes after the Rapid Support Forces took control of Gezira State from the Sudanese Armed Forces.
- 24 December – Residents of White Nile State flee south toward the border with South Sudan amid rumours of an impending Rapid Support Forces assault on the region.
- 25 December – Local leaders and government officials in eastern Sudan call on the general population to mobilize and prepare for potential Rapid Support Forces attacks. The Sudanese Armed Forces is reportedly arming civilians amid fears that they will not be able to stop the militia.

== Deaths ==
- 3 May: Asia Abdelmajid, actress
- 5 May: Fozi el-Mardi, footballer
- 12 May: Shaden Gardood, singer
- 14 June: Khamis Abakar, governor of West Darfur
- 22 August: Ahmed Abkar Barqo Abdel-Rahman, member of parliament
