= 2025 in Sudan =

- Decades: 2000s; 2010s; 2020s
- See also: Other events of 2025; History of Sudan

The following lists events during 2025 in the Republic of the Sudan.

== Incumbents ==
- Chairman of the Transitional Sovereignty Council: Abdel Fattah al-Burhan
- Deputy Chairman of the Sovereignty Council: Malik Agar
- Prime Minister: Osman Hussein (acting, until 30 April); Kamil Idris (since 19 May)

== Events ==
Ongoing: Sudanese civil war (2023–present), Famine in Sudan (2024–present)

=== January ===
- 7 January – The United States officially declares that the Rapid Support Forces are committing genocide in Sudan and imposes sanctions on its leader, Hemedti.
- 11 January – The Sudanese Armed Forces says it has retaken control of Wad Madani, the capital of Gezira State from the RSF.
- 16 January – The US imposes sanctions on SAF chief General Abdel Fattah al-Burhan for the army's conduct in the civil war.

=== February ===
- 19 February – The Sudanese government announces unspecified amendments to the Transitional Constitutional Declaration serving as the country's provisional constitution since 2019.
- 20–22 February – At least 58 people die while 1,300 others fall ill following an outbreak of cholera in Kosti.
- 23 February –
  - The RSF and allied groups sign a charter establishing a parallel "government of peace and unity" in Sudan following a meeting in Nairobi, Kenya.
  - The SAF lifts the RSF's two-year siege of El Obeid.
- 25 February – An SAF Antonov An-26 transport aircraft crashes into a residential area in Omdurman during takeoff from Wadi Seidna Air Base, killing at least 46 people including senior SAF officials.

=== March ===
- 14 March – The Sudanese government orders a ban on imports from Kenya, citing national security concerns amid criticism over the latter's hosting of the RSF.
- 21 March – The SAF says it has retaken the Presidential Palace in Khartoum from the RSF.
- 26 March – SAF commander Abdel Fattah al-Burhan proclaims the liberation of Khartoum from the RSF.

=== April ===
- 13 April – The RSF says it has taken the Zamzam Refugee Camp near El Fasher.
- 15 April – The RSF announce the formation of a parallel Government of Peace and Unity.
- 28 April –
  - The Sudan Doctors Network reports that at least 31 people were executed by the RSF in Omdurman.
  - The RSF attack El Fasher and Abu Shouk, killing at least 40 civilians.
- 30 April – UAE authorities intercept millions of rounds of ammunition at an airport intended for the SAF.

=== May ===
- 2 May – The RSF capture the city of al-Nahud in West Kordofan from the SAF, killing 19 and injuring 37.
- 3 May – RSF launches a bombardment of the SAF’s General Command HQ in Khartoum.
- 4 May – The RSF launches a drone attack on Port Sudan, the de facto headquarters of the SAF-led government, for the first time since the beginning of the war.
- 5 May – The International Court of Justice dismisses a case filed by Sudan accusing the United Arab Emirates of genocide for its support of the RSF, citing lack of authority to continue the proceedings.
- 6 May – Sudan cuts diplomatic relations with the UAE due to its support for the RSF.
- 19 May – General al-Burhan appoints Kamil Idris as prime minister. He is sworn in on 31 May.
- 20 May – The SAF announces the clearing of Khartoum State from the RSF.
- 22 May – The United States Department of State announces it would impose sanctions on the Sudanese government after determining it had used chemical weapons in 2024.
- 26 May – The SAF captures an RSF base in Omdurman that contains UK-made small-arms target systems and engines for UAE-produced armoured personnel carriers.
- 27 May – Eight tonnes of essential medical supplies are delivered to El Geneina Hospital in West Darfur by the WHO to support services for the next six months.
- 29 May – A cholera outbreak in Khartoum kills at least 70 people in two days, with 172 deaths nationwide.

=== June ===
- 1 June – Prime Minister Idris orders the dissolution of the transitional government.
- 4 June – US President Donald Trump issues a proclamation barring Sudanese nationals from entering the United States.
- 8 June – Seven people are shot dead in a rampage killing by an SAF soldier in Khashm El Girba, Kassala State. The shooter is subsequently injured in a shootout with soldiers and arrested along with a companion.
- 11 June – The RSF seizes control over the Sudan-Egypt-Libya border triangle, allegedly with the help of the Libyan National Army.
- 21 June – The Al-Mujlad Hospital in Muglad, West Kordofan is attacked, killing over 40 people, including six children and five healthcare workers.
- 29 June – Eleven people are killed when a gold mine collapses in Houeid, River Nile State.

=== July ===
- 1 July – The RSF and the SPLM-N (al-Hilu) announce the creation in Nyala of a governing alliance headed by Hemedti, with SPLM-N leader Abdelaziz al-Hilu as his deputy.
- 4 July –
  - An attack is made on Sudanese farmers by Ethiopian militias at the disputed Al-Fashaga District.
  - Four people are killed in clashes between the Kababish tribe and the Hawawir people in Al-Dabbah, Northern State.
- 11 July –The RSF launch a major attack on El Fasher, seizing the city's main livestock market, the Shalla prison and the headquarters of the Central Reserve Forces before being driven back the next day by the SAF.
- 12 July – The RSF kill nearly 300 civilians in attacks on villages near Bara, North Kordofan.

=== August ===
- 6 August – The UAE bans Sudanese airliners from the country.
- 7 August – Seven people, including an officer of the Sudan Shield Forces, are killed in clashes caused by a land dispute in Al-Qadambaliyya, Al Qadarif State.
- 12 August – At least 40 people are killed in an attack on the Abu Shouk camp for displaced people in El Fasher, reportedly carried out by the RSF.
- 20 August – A World Food Programme convoy to North Darfur is attacked near Mellit. Three trucks are burned and no casualties are reported, with the SAF and the RSF blaming each other.
- 27 August –
  - At least 10 people are reported killed in nationwide flooding.
  - The RSF shell the central market and Awlad al-Reef neighborhood in El Fasher, killing 24 and wounding 55, according to the Sudan Doctors Network.
- 30 August – Hemedti, head of the RSF, is sworn in as head of a parallel Sudanese government in Nyala.
- 31 August – Between 370 to 1,000 people are reported killed in a landslide caused by heavy rains that buries the village of Tarasin in the Marrah Mountains of Central Darfur and leaves one survivor.

=== September ===
- 1 September – General al-Burhan appoints Intisar Ahmed Abdel-Aal as public prosecutor, making her the first woman to hold the post.
- 2 September – General al-Burhan appoints Wahbi Mohammed Mukhtar as president of the Constitutional Court following a six-year vacancy.
- 4 September – Sixty-five foreign nationals are rescued following an operation by security forces against human traffickers in Kassala.
- 12 September – The United States imposes sanctions on finance minister and Justice and Equality Movement leader Gibril Ibrahim and the Al-Bara' ibn Malik Battalion for their role in the civil war and connections with Iran.
- 13 September – Five people are killed in an attack by the Wagner Group and auxiliaries from the Central African Republic on Um Dafuq, South Darfur.
- 15 September – The Central Bank of Sudan declares a ban on the exportation of gold by the private sector as part of efforts to combat smuggling and preserve foreign currency reserves. The ban is lifted by the Central Bank on 5 November.
- 18 September – General al-Burhan dismisses Al-Nur Ajabna Ezz Al-Arab as deputy governor of the Central Bank amid allegations of the latter's involvement in corruption.
- 19 September –
  - The government suspends the work permit of Al Arabiya and Al-Hadath bureau chief Lina Yagoub, accusing her of professional misconduct that risked national security.
  - The RSF carries out a drone strike on a mosque in El Fasher during prayers, killing 78 people.
- 23 September – A drone strike attributed to the RSF hits a market in El Fasher, killing 15 people and wounding 12.
- 30 September – At least 18 civilians are killed by RSF shelling at the Abu Taleb School shelter in El Fasher.

=== October ===
- 1 October – The Emergency Response Rooms receive the Right Livelihood Award for its role in "building a resilient model of mutual aid" amid the ongoing civil war.
- 6 October – The International Criminal Court convicts Janjaweed commander Ali Kushayb on 27 counts of war crimes and crimes against humanity committed during the War in Darfur, including rape, murder, and persecution. He is sentenced to 20 years imprisonment on 9 December.
- 10 October – Drone and artillery attacks by the RSF on a shelter in El Fasher kill at least 60 civilians.
- 13 October –
  - General al-Burhan dismisses Borai El Siddig Ali Ahmed as governor of the Central Bank and replaces him with Amna Mirghani Hassan al-Toum, making her the first woman to hold the position.
  - Two people are killed in shooting involving members of SAF-aligned militias at a hospital in Atbara.
- 22 October – Khartoum International Airport reopens for the first time since the start of the civil war.
- 23 October – The Central Bank freezes the assets of former prime minister Abdalla Hamdok and 38 other politicians on charges of supporting the RSF.
- 25 October – The Rwanda Football Federation announces that Sudanese football clubs Al Hilal, Al Merrikh, and Al Ahli Wad Madani will compete in the Rwanda Premier League for the 2025/26 season.
- 26 October – The RSF announce the capture of the SAF headquarters in El Fasher after an 18-month siege.
- 27 October – Five volunteers with the International Federation of Red Cross and Red Crescent Societies are killed in North Kordofan while distributing food aid. Three other volunteers are reported missing.

=== November ===
- 3 November – The UN-backed Integrated Food Security Phase Classification marks the first formal famine declaration in El Fasher and Kadugli.
- 4 November –
  - At least 49 people are killed in an RSF drone strike on a funeral in North Kordofan state, with dozens more injured.
  - An SAF cargo aircraft crashes near Babanusa after carrying out a resupply mission, killing its entire crew.
- 7 November – Two people are injured in the explosion of an ammunition dump operated by the Joint Darfur Force in Al-Azhari, Khartoum.
- 20 November – The European Union imposes sanctions on RSF commander Abdul Rahim Dagalo over atrocities committed in Darfur during the civil war.
- 21 November – The Awlad Gammari (Sons of Gamari), an SAF-allied militia group based in Dongola, stages a mutiny, resulting in clashes with the SAF that left leaves two people dead before being suppressed by the SAF the next day.
- 24 November – The RSF declares a unilateral three-month humanitarian ceasefire.

=== December ===
- 1 December – The RSF takes full control of Babanusa in West Kordofan, violating its unilateral humanitarian truce.
- 4 December – Attacks on a kindergarten and a nearby hospital in South Kordofan result in more than 100 deaths .
- 8 December – The RSF seizes control over the Heglig oil field.
- 9 December – An Ilyushin Il-76 cargo plane of the Sudanese Air Force crashes near Port Sudan, killing all crew members on board.
- 10 December – The South Sudan People's Defence Forces deploys personnel to secure the Heglig oilfield following a "tripartite agreement" involving South Sudanese president Salva Kiir, General al-Burhan, and Hemedti to secure vital energy infrastructure in the area amid the civil war.
- 12 December – The United Kingdom imposes sanctions on four senior RSF commanders, namely Abdul Rahim Dagalo, Gedo Hamdan Ahmed, Brigadier General Al-Fateh Abdullah Idris; and Field Commander Tijani Ibrahim Moussa Mohamed, over their role in the El Fasher massacre.
- 13 December – Six Bangladeshi UN peacekeepers are killed in a drone strike on their base in Kadugli.
- 23 December – A maritime cooperation agreement is signed between Port Sudan and Mersin, Turkey.
- 27 December – Darfur genocide: The RSF kill over 200 civilians in attacks targeting non-Arabs in North and West Darfur.

== Holidays ==
- 1 January – Independence Day
- 7 January – Coptic Christmas
- 30 March – 2 April – Ramadan Bairam Holiday
- 5–9 June – Corban Bairam Holiday
- 26 June – Islamic New Year
- 4 September – The Prophet's Birthday
- 19 December – Revolution Day
- 25 December – Christmas Day

== Deaths ==
- 6 October – Mohamed Tahir Ayala, 74, prime minister (2019), governor of Red Sea State (2005–2015) and Gezira State (2015–2019).
- 26 October – Siham Hassan, human rights activist and politician, member of the National Assembly of Sudan (2016–2019).
- 2 November – Bona Malwal, 97, minister of information (1973–1978)

== Art and entertainment ==
- List of Sudanese submissions for the Academy Award for Best International Feature Film
