= 2024 in Sudan =

- Decades: 2000s; 2010s; 2020s
- See also: Other events of 2024; History of Sudan

The following lists events during 2024 in the Republic of the Sudan.

== Incumbents ==
- Chairman of the Transitional Sovereignty Council: Abdel Fattah al-Burhan
- Deputy Chairman of the Sovereignty Council: Malik Agar
- Prime Minister: Osman Hussein (acting)

== Events ==
Ongoing: Sudanese civil war (2023–present), 2024 Sudan famine

=== January ===
- 8 January – The SPLM-N (al-Hilu) together with the Sudanese Armed Forces (SAF) clashes with the Rapid Support Forces (RSF) in the Nuba Mountains, while the SAF launches airstrikes on an RSF camp in Al-Dabaibat, north of Dalang.
- 15 January – Clashes in Khartoum State kill thirteen civilians as the SAF continue their offensive in Omdurman.
- 16 January – Sudan suspends its membership of the Intergovernmental Authority on Development (IGAD) after accusing it of inviting RSF leader Hemedti to an upcoming summit in Kampala, Uganda.

=== February ===
- 22 February – The World Food Programme releases a report stating over 95% of Sudan's population cannot afford a meal a day.
- 26 February – Sudanese military ruler Abdel Fattah al-Burhan meets with Libyan Government of National Unity prime minister Abdul Hamid Dbeibeh to request help in the war in Sudan in response to the involvement of Libyan mercenaries.

=== March ===
- 12 March – The SAF says it took control of the national television and radio broadcaster in Omdurman from the RSF.

=== April ===
- 7 April – An RSF attack kills at least 20 civilians in the outskirts of Khartoum.
- 12 April – Canada pledges $132.2 million to Sudan to help people affected by the country's ongoing humanitarian crisis.
- 13 April – An offensive by the RSF begins in El Fasher.
- 15 April –
  - The RSF captures Mellit, North Darfur.
  - Battle of El Fasher: At least nine civilians are killed and sixty others are injured during a renewed offensive by the RSF on El Fasher.
  - Siege of El Obeid: Five civilians are killed and ten others are injured during crossfire between the SAF and RSF.
  - The Joint Darfur Force declares war on the RSF and allies with the SAF.
- 17 April – Taqaddum leader and former Prime Minister of Sudan Abdalla Hamdok meets with French President Emmanuel Macron in Paris.

=== May ===
- 12 May – Battle of El Fasher: RSF attacks on eastern El Fasher kill at least 38 civilians and injure 189 others.
- 15 May – The United States issues sanctions on RSF commanders Ali Yagoub Gibril and Osman Mohamed Hamid for their roles in the escalating violence in Darfur.

=== June ===
- 2 June –
  - Battle of El Fasher:
    - Approximately eleven civilians are killed and 42 are injured after large clashes between the RSF, the SAF, and various rebel militia groups in El Fasher.
    - UNICEF announces that over 270,000 people, including more than 130,000 children are at risk after fighting at the Golo Reservoir in El Fasher.
  - Battle of Khartoum: Seven soldiers are killed and 28 are injured after an offensive by the RSF in the area of Khartoum.
- 5 June –
  - Wad Al-Noora massacre: The RSF storm the village of Wad Al-Noora in Gezira State and massacre nearly 100 villagers.
  - Battle of El Fasher
    - Over 27,000 people from El Fasher take refuge in Jebel Marra.
- 10 June – Battle of El Fasher: The last remaining operational hospital in El Fasher closes down after being stormed and looted by the RSF, according to Médecins Sans Frontières.
- 12 June – The United Nations adds the SAF and the RSF to its list of offenders for violating children's rights.
- 14 June – The SAF kills Ali Yaqoub Gibril a US-sanctioned RSF commander amidst fierce fighting in El Fasher.
- 19 June – Sudan accuses the United Arab Emirates of arming the RSF.
- 20 June – The RSF captures Al-Fulah, the capital of West Kordofan, after the SAF withdraw from the city after several hours of fighting.
- 27 June – An Integrated Food Security Phase Classification (IPC) report states that over 755,000 people in Sudan face the most severe IPC level of extreme hunger as well as the worst levels of acute food insecurity ever recorded in the country.
- 29 June – The RSF launches captures Singa, the capital of Sennar State.

=== July ===
- 4 July – Twenty-five people drown in Sennar State while trying to flee fighting between the SAF and the RSF.
- 5 July – Sennar offensive: The RSF captures Dinder again, after it was briefly recaptured by the SAF on 4 July. The town was first captured by the RSF on 2 July.
- 9 July – Ethiopian Prime Minister Abiy Ahmed meets with Sudanese leader Abdel Fattah al-Burhan in Port Sudan to seek an end to the ongoing civil war in Sudan.
- 18 July – The United States pledges $203 million to help millions of civilians affected by the war in Sudan.
- 21 July – Sudan and Iran exchange ambassadors for the first time since the cutting of relations in 2016.
- 23 July – The United States invites the SAF and the RSF to ceasefire talks in Switzerland on 14 August.
- 27 July – At least 22 people are killed and 75 others are injured in an RSF attack on El Fasher.
- 28 July – At least twelve people are killed by extensive flooding throughout Kassala State that submerges several internal displacement camps.
- 30 July – Al-Burhan survives an assassination attempt by a drone in Jubayt, Red Sea State, during a military graduation ceremony at the Jubayt army base. Five others are killed in the attack.

=== August ===
- 1 August – 2024 Sudan famine: The Global Famine Review Committee declares a famine in Darfur, according to the Integrated Food Security Phase Classification.
- 5 August – Eight miners are killed in the collapse of a shaft at the Agbash-Khatt mine in El Radoom, South Darfur.
- 6 August – At least 53 people are killed and 60 others are injured in RSF raids on several neighborhoods in El Fasher and Gezira State.
- 13 August:
  - At least 68 people are killed in Sudan's worst flooding since 2019, impacting several internally displaced persons camps amid the ongoing Sudanese civil war.
  - The Health Ministry declares an outbreak of cholera in Kassala, Gezira, and Khartoum States. At least 22 people are reported to have died.
  - Civilian authorities affiliated with the Sudan People's Liberation Movement–North declare a state of famine over parts of South Kordofan and Blue Nile States affecting around three million people.
- 15 August – Galgani massacre: At least 108 people are killed in arson and looting attacks amid a rampage by the RSF in the village of Galgani in Sennar State.
- 17 August – Customs officials at the Wadi Halfa border crossing with Egypt go on strike in protest against administrative reforms, prompting the Sovereignty Council to take full control of the crossing on 20 August.
- 21 August – Workers at the port of Suakin go on strike in protest against new regulations over the importation of goods.
- 24 August – At least 60 people are killed and more than 100 others are reported missing after the Arbaat Dam collapses following heavy rains in Red Sea State.
- 26 August – The RSF shells the Abu Shouk internally displaced persons camp in North Darfur, killing 25 people and wounding at least 40 others.
- 30 August – Seven people are killed and 25 others are injured by RSF shelling in Omdurman.

=== September ===
- 8 September – The UN estimates that the death toll in the ongoing civil war has surpassed 20,000.
- 9 September – The RSF renews its assault on Sennar, killing at least 31 people and injuring more than 100 others.
- 26 September - The Sudanese army launches a major offensive in Khartoum for the first time, recapturing parts of Bahri and Khartoum.
- 27 September – At least 18 people are killed by RSF shelling on a market in Al-Fashir.
- 29 September – The residence of the ambassador of the United Arab Emirates to Khartoum is bombed, with the UAE accusing the SAF of launching an airstrike and the latter blaming the RSF for the incident.

=== October ===
- 9 October – Activist Nada Fadol is awarded the Nansen Refugee Award by the United Nations High Commissioner for Refugees, citing her work in mobilising aid for people fleeing the country's civil war towards Egypt.
- 12 October – At least 23 people are killed and 40 others are injured in an SAF airstrike on a marketplace in an area of Khartoum controlled by the RSF.
- 21 October –
  - At least 31 people are killed and 15 others are injured in an SAF airstrike on a mosque in Wad Madani.
  - An Ilyushin Il-76 cargo aircraft crashes in the Malha area of North Darfur, killing all five people on board including two Russians. The RSF claims to have shot down the aircraft, which was allegedly carrying supplies to the SAF in El Fasher.
- 27 October – A crop duster collides with a ground vehicle while landing in Al-Fashaga District, Gedaref State, killing four people and injuring eight others.
- 29 October – At least 141 people are reported killed following a week of massacres committed by the RSF on villages in Gezira State.

=== November ===
- 3 November –
  - Al-Burhan reshuffles his cabinet, resulting in the replacement of the ministers of foreign affairs, culture and information, and religious affairs.
  - The Sudanese government cancels a 2022 agreement with a UAE-based firm to develop the Abu Amama port in the Red Sea, citing Abu Dhabi's support for the RSF.

== Holidays ==
- 1 January – Independence Day
- 7 January – Coptic Christmas
- 10–13 April – Ramadan Bairam Holiday
- 15–19 June – Corban Bairam Holiday
- 7 July – Islamic New Year
- 15 September – The Prophet's Birthday
- 19 December – Revolution Day
- 25 December – Christmas Day

== Art and entertainment ==
- List of Sudanese submissions for the Academy Award for Best International Feature Film

== Deaths ==
- February 11 – Shartai Jaafar Abdel Hakam, Sudanese politician.
