= 2020 in Sudan =

- Decades: 2000s; 2010s; 2020s
- See also: Other events of 2020; History of Sudan

The following lists events that happened during 2020 in Sudan.

== Incumbents ==
- Chairman of the Sovereignty Council: Abdel Fattah al-Burhan
- Prime Minister: Abdalla Hamdok
- Deputy Chairman of the Sovereignty Council: Mohamed Hamdan Dagalo

== Ongoing ==
- War in Darfur

== Events ==
=== February ===
- 9 February – Sudanese leader Abdel Fattah Abdelrahman Burhan met with Prime Minister Benjamin Netanyahu of Israel. Former deputy Prime Minister Mubarak al Fadil al Mahdi of Sudan said it would be good to normalize relations with Israel.
- 11 February – The Government of Sudan agreed that former president Omar al-Bashir will face war crime charges before the International Criminal Court, where he is accused of 300,000 deaths in Darfur.
- 13 February – Sudan said it has reached a settlement in the USS Cole bombing, a first step in being removed from the designation as a state supporter of terrorism.

=== March ===
- 13 March
  - The country reports its first COVID-19 case in Khartoum, a man who died on 12 March 2020 and had visited the United Arab Emirates in the first week of March.
  - Sudan stopped issuing visas for, and flights to, eight countries, including Italy and neighbouring Egypt, over fears of the coronavirus outbreak.

=== April ===
- 22 April – Sudan reports 13 deaths and 140 confirmed cases of COVID-19, but there are fears that the actual number is much higher as people only go to the hospital when they are very sick. The government has increased its health budget by 200%, but $120 million to fight the new virus and $150 million to cover medicines until June is still needed. Importing equipment and medicine is difficult as suppliers prioritize their own countries.
- 29 April – Representatives from the United Arab Emirates (UAE) visit Sudan to rally support and recruit fighters for Libya's Khalifa Haftar.
- 30 April – Sudan criminalizes female genital mutilation.

=== May ===
- 6 May – Fighting between Arabs and non-Arabs in South Darfur, Sudan, leaves thirty dead and a dozen wounded.
- 12 May – Sudan pushes Ethiopia to resume discussion related to the $4.6 billion Grand Ethiopian Renaissance Dam on the Nile River that officials say will start filling in July.
- 13 May – In the third incident of armed violence this month, 24 people, including paratroopers are killed in Kaduqli, Sudan.
- 23 May – Sudan announces the formation of a special police force to prevent attacks on health workers. The country has reported at least 63 deaths from COVID-19 among around 3,380 confirmed cases of the coronavirus. There have been two dozen attacks on health workers over the past two months.

=== June ===
- 2 June – Sudan appoints Maj. Gen. Yassin Ibrahim Yassin as its new Defense Minister.
- 9 June – Sudanese militia leader Ali Kushayb, is arrested and charged with 50 crimes against humanity and war crimes in the War in Darfur.
- 26 June – Egypt, Sudan, and Ethiopia agree to delay filling the Grand Ethiopian Renaissance Dam (GERD).

=== July ===
- 11 July – Sudan institutes reforms allowing non-Muslims to drink alcohol in private and outlawing Female Genital Mutilation (FGM).
- 13 July – Sudanese security forces violently break up a protest camp in North Darfur, killing at least protester and wounding a dozen others, including four children, activists.
- 24 July
  - Mass graves likely tied to a 1990 coup attempt against former President Omar al-Bashir in Sudan are discovered.
  - 2020 Darfur attacks - An attack on Aboudos in South Darfur left at least 20 people dead and another 22 were injured.
- July – Gold hunters used heavy machinery to excavate the two millennia-old Jabal Maragha archaeological site in the Bayuda Desert, destroying it. The gold diggers were arrested and their equipment seized, but they were later released without charges in July 2020.

=== August ===
- 22 August – Prime Minister Abdalla Hamdok announces that Sudan is willing to turn former dictator Omar al-Bashir over to the International Criminal Court.
- 30 August – Ninety people die and hundreds of homes are destroyed in torrential rains.
- 31 August – The transitional government and the Sudan Revolutionary Front initial a peace agreement in South Sudan.

=== September ===
- 4 September – Record water levels of 17.57 metres (57.6 ft) on the Blue Nile kill 94 and destroy 60,000 homes. Rain is expected to continue throughout the month. Some experts, such as International Rivers, expect climate change to cause periodic bouts of drought and flooding in the future. Authorities declare a three-month long state of emergency.
- 8 September – Flooding threatens the Pyramids of Meroë.
- 17 September – Filmmaker Hajooj Kuka is among the five Sudanaese artists convicted on charges of public disturbance and violating public safety measures in Khartoum in a demonstration against dictator Omar al-Bashir in 2019. Six others are awaiting similar charges.

=== October ===
- 2 October – The United Nations Office for the Coordination of Humanitarian Affairs reports flooding has claimed more than 120 lives and left 860,000 people homeless.
- 3 October – The government of Sudan and ten rebel groups sign a peace agreement, ending 17 years of war.
- 23 October – Israel–Sudan normalization agreement

=== November ===
- 13 November – The government declares amnesty for those who fought in the civil war, except for individuals charged with war crimes.

=== December ===
- 8 December – Russia signs an agreement to use Port Sudan as a navy base on the Red Sea for 25 years.
- 9 December – General Abdel Fattah al-Burhan says the transitional council has failed in its mission to bring about civilian rule.
- 15 December – Sudan says that "Ethiopian forces and militias" ambushed Sudanese army forces near Jabal Abutiour, Sudan. Prime Minister Abdalla Hamdok visited Ethiopia briefly on 13 December to discuss the security situation.
- 23 December – War in Darfur: The United Nations says it will withdraw its forces from Darfur on 31 December 2020. A peace agreement was signed in October of this year, but some groups, including Amnesty International, have called for an extension of the UNAMID mission.
- 27 December – The government sends troops to South Darfur after ethnic fighting ends with 15 deaths in a dispute over water rights.

== Deaths ==
- 9 February – Abdel Aziz El Mubarak, 69, singer; pneumonia.
- 25 March – Jamal Aldin Omar, 60, Defence Minister.
- 8 September – Sitouna, 58, actress and singer.
- 26 November – Sadiq al-Mahdi, 84, politician and religious leader, Prime Minister (1966–1967, 1986–1989); COVID-19.
- 21 December – Bahaa el-Din Nouri, 45, electrician from Darfur; tortured to death.
- 27 December – Abdel-Rahman Nour-el-Daem al-Tom, Sudanese politician, Governor of Blue Nile state, traffic collision.

== See also ==
- 2020 in North Africa
- COVID-19 pandemic in Africa
- Grand Ethiopian Renaissance Dam
- 2020 Sudan floods
