= 2026 in Sudan =

- Decades: 2000s; 2010s; 2020s
- See also: Other events of 2026; History of Sudan

The following lists events during 2026 in the Republic of the Sudan.

== Incumbents ==
- Chairman of the Transitional Sovereignty Council: Abdel Fattah al-Burhan
- Deputy Chairman of the Sovereignty Council: Malik Agar
- Prime Minister: Kamil Idris

== Events ==
=== Ongoing ===
- Sudanese civil war (2023–present)
  - Timeline of the Sudanese civil war (2026)
- Famine in Sudan (2024–present)

=== January ===
- 11 January – The SAF-aligned government announces its complete return to Khartoum, having operated in Port Sudan as the temporary capital since 2022.
- 25 January – At least six people are killed in a collapse at the Umm Fakrun gold mine in Abu Jubeiha, South Kordofan.
- 26 January – The SAF breaks the RSF siege of Dalang, South Kordofan.

=== February ===
- 3 February – The SAF breaks the RSF siege of Kadugli in South Kordofan, reopening the Kadugli–Dalang road.
- 9 February – Two people are killed in a fire that ravages a IDP camp in Tawila, North Darfur.
- 11 February – A ferry capsizes along the Nile River in Shendi District, River Nile State, killing at least 21 people and leaving 12 others missing.
- 15 February – A ferry capsizes along the White Nile in Wad Alzaky, leaving 12 people missing.
- 21 February – Authorities seize 20 smuggled gold ingots weighing approximately 21 kg (46 lb) from a truck in River Nile State.
- 22 February – Sudanese Awakening Revolutionary Council leader Musa Hilal survives an RSF drone attack on his guest house in Misteriya, North Darfur.
- 23 February – Chad closes its border with Sudan after five Chadian soldiers and three civilians were killed, and 12 more people were injured, in clashes with militia groups affiliated with the Sudanese government that crossed the border into Wadi Fira region two days ago.
- 24 February – Pekka Haavisto of Finland is appointed as special envoy of the United Nations secretary general to Sudan.

=== March ===
- 1 March – A fire destroys more than 1,000 homes at the Kalma displacement camp in Nyala.
- 3 March – A fire breaks out at the Abu Dhar displacement camp in Umm Dukhun, Central Darfur, killing three people.
- 4 March – The United Kingdom suspends the issuance of student visas to Sudanese nationals as part of efforts to reduce asylum requests.
- 7 March – The health ministry announces that the country will launch a Hepatitis B vaccine campaign for newborns in 10 states.
- 9 March – The United States designates the Islamic Movement in Sudan and its armed wing, the Al-Bara' ibn Malik Battalion, as terrorist organizations.
- 19 March – Chad closes its border with Sudan in response to a cross-border drone strike in Chad that kills 16 people the previous day.
- 21 March –
  - A strike on Ed Daein Teaching Hospital in East Darfur kills at least 70 people.
  - One person is killed in a fire that destroys more than 900 homes at the El Omda refugee camp in Tawila, North Darfur.
- 25 March –
  - A drone strike on a market in Saraf Omra kills at least 22 people.
  - A drone strike on a civilian truck near El Rahad kills at least six people.
- 29 April – A nationwide strike is launched by university professors in protest over deteriorating working conditions and low salaries.

=== April ===
- 2 April – Yasser al-Atta is appointed Chief of Staff of the SAF, succeeding Othman al-Hussein.
- 3 April – At least 12 people are killed in an RSF drone strike on Al-Jabalain hospital in White Nile State.
- 15 April –
  - Five people are killed in a fire at an IDP camp in Rokoro, Central Darfur.
  - Six people are killed in a collapse at a gold mine in Keliti, Red Sea State.
- 25 April – Four people die following an outbreak of measles in Shangil Tobaya, North Darfur.
- 27 April –
  - Seven police officers are killed in clashes with armed pastoralists inside Dinder National Park in Sennar State.
  - Four people are killed in a fire at an IDP camp in Golo, Central Darfur.
- 28 April – The government orders a ban on importing more than 40 "luxurious and unnecessary" categories of goods amid a depreciation in the value of the Sudanese pound.
- 30 April – The Sudanese Journalists Syndicate is awarded the 2026 World Press Freedom Prize for its coverage of attacks on journalists during the civil war.

=== May ===
- 1 May – Commercial services along the Nile between Egypt and Sudan resume for the first time since 2020.
- 5 May – Sudan recalls its ambassador to Ethiopia after accusing the latter country of carrying out a drone attack on Khartoum International Airport the previous day.
- 11 May – The RSF-aligned government based in Nyala forms a parallel central bank known as the Transitional Currency Council.
- 13 May – At least 61 people are reported killed following clashes between the SPLM-N (al-Hilu) and members of the Atoro tribe in Kauda, South Kordofan.
- 16 May – Three people are killed in an ambush on a vehicle along the Gireida–Buram road in South Darfur.
- 17 May – Demonstrators block a section of the Dongola-Wadi Halfa highway in Abri, Northern State, in protest against daily power outages.
- 18 May – A truck and a box vehicle carrying smuggled explosives used for mining detonate in Abu Talha, Kassala State, killing five people.
- 21 May – The RSF-aligned government appoints former Central Bank of Sudan governor Hussein Yahya Jangoul as governor of its Transitional Currency Council.
- 29 May – At least 58 people are killed during RSF attacks on multiple villages near Bara, North Kordofan.
- 31 May – Tribal clashes erupt in South Darfur between the Beni Halba and Salamat tribes. killing least 50 people.

=== June ===
- 7 June – More than 11,000 teachers in Kassala State go on strike in protest over the non-payment of overdue financial entitlements and wage increases.
- 9 June – The Switzerland-based Legal Action Worldwide, representing victims of the civil war, files a complaint against the RSF in Kenya for war crimes, marking the first such legal action against the group outside Sudan.
- 10 June –
  - The value of the Sudanese pound plunges to a record-low against other foreign currencies amidst the ongoing war.
  - The transitional government approves the Darfur regional governance law as part of the Juba Peace Agreement.
- 16 June – Several people are reported killed in shelling and drone strikes targeting gold mines in River Nile State and blamed on the Egyptian Armed Forces.
- 23 June – The Government of National Stability in eastern Libya bans the entry of nationals from Sudan, Eritrea, Ethiopia, and Somalia, citing a reorganization of foreign nationals' entry procedures.
- 29 June – A cholera outbreak is declared in West Kordofan, with the Health Ministry reporting 838 suspected cases, seven confirmed cases, and 117 deaths.
- 30 June – A truck veers off a road in River Nile State and collides with a passenger vehicle, killing 18 people and wounding another.

=== July ===
- 13 July – A court in Port Sudan sentences RSF leader Hemedti to death in absentia for war crimes, crimes against humanity, and genocide over atrocities committed in West Darfur, alongside 15 other senior RSF commanders.
- 14 July – The European Union imposes a ban on the purchase, import and transfer of gold from Sudan, citing the role of the trade in financing the civil war.
- 16 July – The United Kingdom imposes sanctions on 11 individuals and entities linked to illicit gold and financial networks accused of funding both the RSF and the SAF during the Sudanese civil war.
- 23 July – The International Criminal Court terminates proceedings against former Justice and Equality Movement leader Abdallah Banda, after prosecutors withdraw war crimes charges related to a 2007 attack on African Union peacekeepers, citing burden of proof.

=== August ===
- 28 August – The SAF-led government lifts the curfew and state of emergency in Khartoum imposed in 2023.

=== September ===
- 16 September – A gold mine collapse in Al-Nuhud, West Kordofan, kills at least 82 people.
- 20 September – A gold mine collapse in Oni, Red Sea State, kills at least 11 people.

=== October ===
- 9 October – At least 31 people are killed after a drone strike on a refugee camp in an army-controlled area of Blue Nile State.
- 10 October – At least 72 artisanal gold miners are killed in an airstrike near the Egypt–Sudan border; the attack is attributed to the Egyptian Air Force.
- 12 October – Two Egyptian nationals are killed in a shooting in Khartoum.
- 19 October – At least 153 are killed when a drone strike hits a market, in the disputed Abyei region.
- 26 October – The United Kingdom sanctions 15 commanders, militia leaders and security officials from the SAF and RSF over alleged wartime sexual violence, torture and attacks on civilians linked to the Siege of El Fasher.
- 28 October – A court in the UAE sentences eight Sudanese nationals, including Yasser al-Atta, to life imprisonment for arms trafficking and money laundering to the SAF.

=== November ===
- 4 November – The government closes the Ethiopian consulate in El-Gadarif, expelling its diplomats in retaliation for Ethiopia's closure of the Sudanese consulate in Asosa.
- 5 November – Australia imposes sanctions on Abdel Fattah al-Burhan, Hemedti and several other RSF officials (Hussein Barsham and Al-Tijani Karshoum) and the Al-Bara' ibn Malik Battalion over human rights violations in the civil war.
- 8 November – The SAF detains National Congress Party chairman Ahmed Haroun, who is wanted by the International Criminal Court over his alleged role in war crimes and genocide during the War in Darfur.

== Holidays ==
- 1 January – Independence Day
- 20 March – Eid al Fitr
- 26 May – Eid al Adha
- 16 June – Islamic New Year
- 25 August – The Prophet's Birthday

== Deaths ==
- 27 October – Joseph Lagu, 94, Second Vice President (1982–1985), president of the High Executive Council of the Southern Sudan Autonomous Region (1978–1979).
- 13 November – Mohamed Osman al-Mirghani, 90, politician.
