= Abdel Karim al Kabli =

Sudanese singer-songwriter (1932–2021)

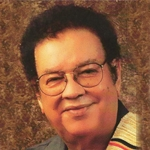

Background information
- Born: 13 April 1932; Port Sudan, Anglo-Egyptian Sudan, Egypt
- Died: 2 December 2021 (aged 89) Flint, Michigan
- Genres: Music of Sudan, Arabic music
- Occupations: Singer, songwriter, composer, poet, oud player, humanitarian
- Instruments: oud, shetern and pennywhistle
- Years active: 1960–2021
- Website: http://www.alkabli.net

Abdel Karim al Kabli (Arabic: عبد الكريم الكابلي), sometimes spelled el Kably or al Kably (13 April 1932 – 2 December 2021), was a popular Sudanese singer-songwriter, poet, composer and humanitarian, known for his songs with themes of love, passion, nationalism, Sudanese culture and folklore.

== Early life ==
Al Kabli was born in the city of Port Sudan in 1932. During childhood, he developed an interest in the Arabic language, especially old Arabic poems, and learned to play music on a penny whistle. At the age of sixteen, he moved to Khartoum to attend the Khartoum Commercial Secondary School, where he studied Sudanese folk music and Arabic poetry. Further, his musical interest evolved to the oud (Arabic lute) and shetern (small drum), which he learned by himself.

== Al Kabli's songs ==
Al Kabli's more than 150 songs contain a diversity of topics and references, including love, passion, revolution, nationalism and Sudanese folklore. Some of his songs use lyrics from classical Arabic poems by the 10th-century Iraqi poet Abu Firas al-Hamdani, the Umayyad Caliph Yazid ibn Mu’awiya, Egyptian poet Abbas Mahmoud al-Aqqad (1889–1964), as well as by prominent Sudanese poets, for example Muhammad Said el-Abbas (1880–1963), Tawfik Salih Jibril (1897–1966), Muhammad el-Mahdi el-Magzoub (1919–1983), and Muhammad al-Fayturi (1936–2015). Other lyrics are in Sudanese Arabic dialect that show his appreciation of the country's spoken language and customs.

Some of his famous songs include "Ya Bint Ashreen" (Oh that girl in her twenties), "Husenek Fa Masher" (My Love Is More Than The Sweet Perfume...), "Sukker Sukker" (Sugar, Sugar), "Asia wa Africa" (Asia and Africa), "Noama", "Cleopatra", "Limaza" (Why?), and "Merowi" (name of the ancient city Meroë in Sudan).

== Humanitarian advocacy ==
Al Kabli was active in peace and reconciliation efforts in Darfur and South Sudan and, through his music and social influence, stressed the rich ethnic diversity in the country. In 2005, he joined other well-known artists and musicians and travelled to South Darfur during the "16 Days of Activism for Violence Against Women", where he performed in camps for the internally displaced persons and in the Nyala stadium. In his later life, his music and poetry dealt with women's equality and women's health, and he was an honorary Goodwill Ambassador for the United Nations Population Fund. - In 2015, his autobiography Melodies Not Militants: An African Artist's Message of Hope was published by himself and his son Saad.

== Death ==
Al Kabli died on 2 December 2021, in the United States, where he had lived with his family in the years before his death.

== Legacy ==
Commemorating the first anniversary of al Kabli's death, Sudanese literary scholars Eiman El-Nour and Adil Babikir published an essay about his life and work, including English translations of poems he used in his songs. Referring to the strong tradition of Sufi brotherhoods in Sudan, the authors called al Kabli "a Sufi in his own right", quoting his poem “On the Love of the Divine Being”.

== Discography ==
Contributing artist

- The Rough Guide to the Music of North Africa (1997, World Music Network)

== Awards ==
- On 12 May 2002, El Kabli was awarded an honorary doctorate in literature from Nyala University, Nyala, Sudan
- He was presented with the Gold Award by Algerian President Abdelaziz Bouteflika
- On 7 October 2004, he was awarded the UNFPA Goodwill Ambassador for Obstetric Fistula in Sudan for his advocacy for women's health, gender equality and human rights.
- In January 2008, he was awarded his second honorary doctorate in music and arts from Sudan University of Science and Technology.

== See also ==
- Music of Sudan
