= Ahmed Abkar Barqo Abdel-Rahman =

Sudanese politician (died 2023)

Ahmed Abkar Barqo Abdel-Rahman (died 22 August 2023) was a Sudanese politician. A member of the Zaghawa people and a member of parliament, he was reportedly killed by the Rapid Support Forces in a raid on his house in Nyala.
