= Kalma, Sudan =

Coordinates: 13°26′N 24°47′E

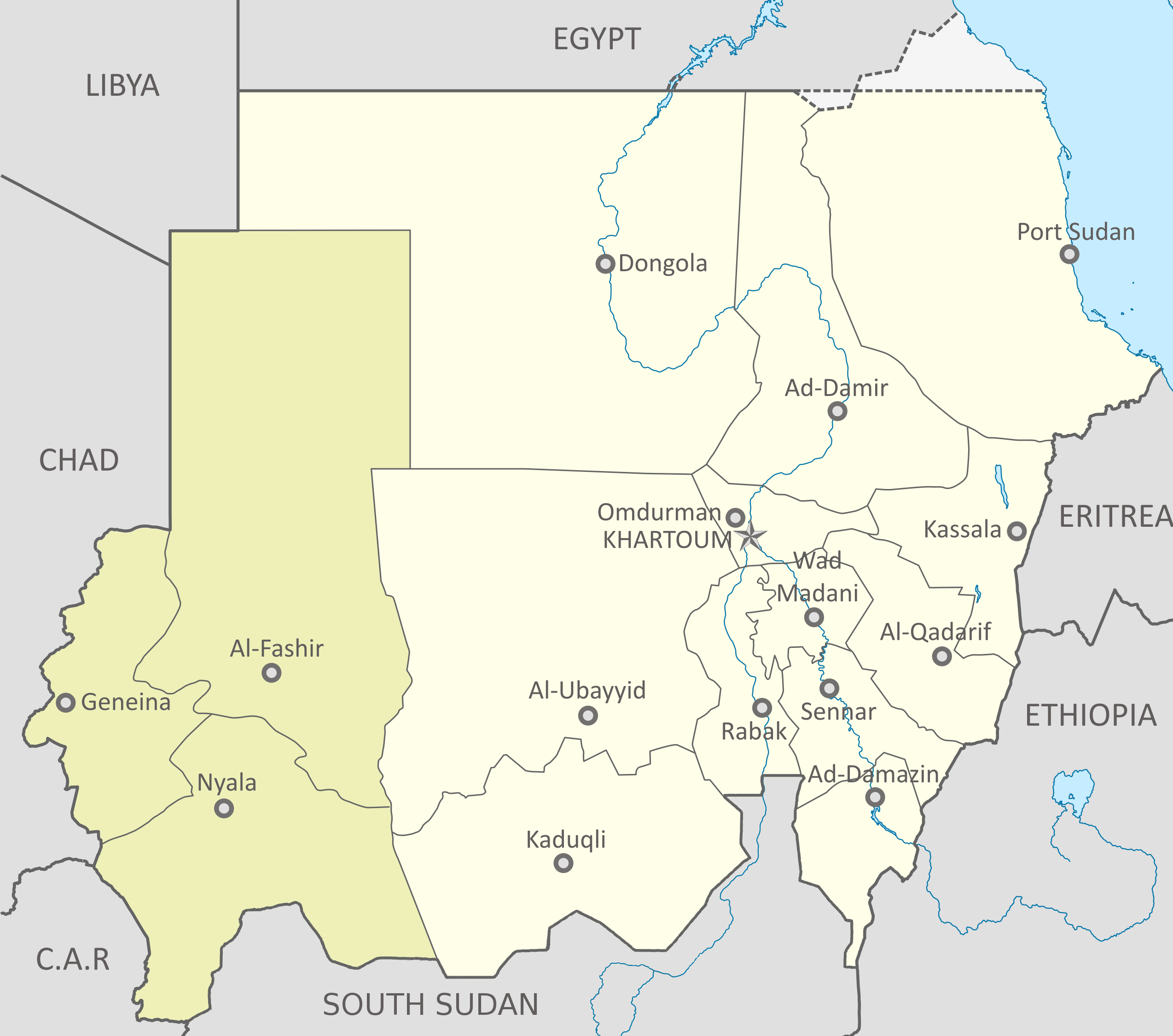
The three states comprising Darfur within Sudan

Kalma is a relocation camp in the Darfur region of Sudan. It is located 17 kilometers outside of Nyala, Sudan. It is estimated that there were over 90,000 residents in the camp in 2007. Most, if not all, of the residents are there because of the violence caused by the Darfur conflict.
