= 2021 in Sudan =

- Decades: 2000s; 2010s; 2020s
- See also: Other events of 2021; History of Sudan

Events in the year 2021 in Sudan.

== Incumbents ==
- Chairman of the Sovereignty Council: Abdel Fattah al-Burhan
- Prime Minister: Abdalla Hamdok
- Deputy Chairman of the Sovereignty Council: Mohamed Hamdan Dagalo

== Ongoing ==
- War in Darfur
- COVID-19 pandemic in Sudan

== Events ==
=== January ===
- 3 January – Sudan, Egypt, and Ethiopia agree to hold further talks this month to resolve their dispute over the Grand Ethiopian Renaissance Dam on the Blue Nile.
- 6 January – Sudan and the United States sign the Abraham Accords opening a path to normalization of Sudanese-Israeli relations and settling the debt with the World Bank.
- 16 January – Fighting between Masalit people and Arab nomads in Al Geneina District leaves 84 dead and 160 wounded, including soldiers. This is two weeks after the United Nations withdrew its peacekeepers from West Darfur.
- 17 January – The death toll in weekend fighting goes to 130 in West Darfur and dozens in South Darfur. At least 50,000 people are displaced.
- 19 January – Tensions rise along the border between Sudan and Ethiopia days after Sudan accused Ethiopia of violating its airspace. South Sudan has offered to mediate.
- 20 January – No injuries or damage reported in an attack on Governor Mohammed Abdalla al-Douma's residence in Geneina, West Darfur.
- 24 January – Police fire tear gas at dozens of people protesting about the economy in Khartoum; similar protests were held in Omdurman. Inflation reached 269% in December and Sudan has a debt of US$60 billion. The Export–Import Bank of the United States recently gave Sudan a $1 billion loan.
- 26 January – General Abdel-Fattah Burhan and Minister of Defence Yassin Ibrahim meet with Israeli Intelligence Minister Eli Cohen in Khartoum.
- January (date unknown) – Islamist Sheikh Muhammed Al-Amin Ismail condemns The Creation of Adam by Italian Renaissance artist Michelangelo, displayed in a history book, as "heresy and atheism". The book has been withdrawn from the curriculum.

=== February ===
- 8 February – Prime Minister Abdalla Hamdok announces a new Cabinet including Gibril Ibrahim as finance minister and ministers from the Sudan Revolutionary Front.
- 10 February – The new Cabinet is sworn in.
- 21 February – The central bank devalues Sudanese currency. The previous official rate was previous official rate of 55 pounds per U.S. dollar, and the new official rate is 375 pounds to the U.S. dollar.

=== March ===
- 1 March – The USS Winston S. Churchill docks in Port Sudan one day after a Russian Admiral Grigorovich-class frigate docks there.
- 3 March – Ten people are killed and 32 wounded in ethnic violence in western Darfur.
- 6 March – Egyptian president Abdel Fattah el-Sisi meets with General Al-Burhan, Prime Minister Hamdok, and General Dagal in Khartoum.
- 26 March – Sudan settles its debt with the World Bank, making it eligible for US$2 billion in grants from the International Development Association.
- 28 March – The government and Sudan People's Liberation Movement-North (SPLM-N) reach an agreement paving the way for peace negotiations between the two sides.

=== June ===
- 23 June – Sudan calls on the United Nations Security Council to meet and discuss on the Grand Ethiopian Renaissance Dam dispute.

=== August ===
- 8 August – Sudan recalls its ambassador to Ethiopia following Ethiopia's decision to reject mediation offer on the war in Tigray.
- 12 August – Sudanese Foreign Minister Mariam al-Mahdi stated that the government would hand over former Sudanese ruler Omar al-Bashir to the International Criminal Court. He was accused of war crimes for the war in Darfur.

=== December ===
- December – Mine collapse kills at least 32 in Kordofan.

== Deaths ==
- 1 January – Abdul Hakim Al-Taher, director and actor (b. 1949).
- 8 February – Malik Badri, 88, psychologist.
- 10 February – Ibrahim Othman Ibrahim Idris, 60, ex-detainee (Guantanamo Bay detention camp).

== See also ==
- COVID-19 pandemic in Africa
- Grand Ethiopian Renaissance Dam
- International Conference on the Great Lakes Region
- Israel–Sudan normalization agreement
