= The Rough Guide to Classic Jazz =

Compilation album by Various artists
- Released: 24 June 1997
- Genre: Jazz
- Length: 71:36
- Label: World Music Network

Full series chronology
The Rough Guide to the Music of North Africa (1997)	The Rough Guide to Classic Jazz (1997)	Best of Latin America (1997)

The Rough Guide to Classic Jazz is a jazz compilation album originally released in 1997. Part of the World Music Network Rough Guides series, the album covers the genre's growth from the turn of the 20th century to the 1930s, largely focusing on the "Jazz Age". The compilation was produced by Phil Stanton, co-founder of the World Music Network. Curation was performed by Robert Parker, an audio engineer specializing in the period and host of the radio show Jazz Classics in Digital Stereo.

== Critical reception ==
Professional ratings
Review scores
Source	Rating
Allmusic	4/5 stars

Keith Farley of AllMusic called it a "fine introduction". Michaelangelo Matos, writing for the Chicago Reader, claimed it "buried" the contemporaneous Swing Revival and noted his surprise at the number of "obscure white groups".

== Track listing ==
No.	Title	Artist	Length
1.	"Dr Jazz"	Jelly Roll Morton's Red Hot Peppers	3:24
2.	"Smoke-House Blues"	Jelly Roll Morton's Red Hot Peppers	3:26
3.	"Dixie Jass Band One-Step"	Original Dixieland Jazz Band	2:37
4.	"Dippermouth Blues"	King Oliver's Creole Jazz Band	2:26
5.	"Mr. Jelly Lord"	New Orleans Rhythm Kings	3:04
6.	"Sugar Foot Stomp"	Fletcher Henderson & His Orchestra	2:48
7.	"Potato Head Blues"	Louis Armstrong & His Hot Seven	2:55
8.	"West End Blues"	Louis Armstrong & His Hot Five	3:17
9.	"Hear Me Talking to You"	Ma Rainey with her Tub Jug Washboard Band	2:59
10.	"Nobody Knows You When You're Down and Out"	Bessie Smith	2:57
11.	"Shake That Jelly-Roll"	J.C. Cobb & His Grains Of Corn	2:57
12.	"Stomp Your Stuff"	State Street Ramblers	3:11
13.	"Pinetop's Boogie Woogie"	Pinetop Smith	3:09
14.	"Nobody's Sweetheart"	McKenzie and Condon's Chicagoans	3:05
15.	"Since My Girl Turned Me Down"	Bix Beiderbecke & His Gang	3:03
16.	"Beale Street Blues"	The Charleston Chasers	2:59
17.	"Imagination"	Miff Mole & His Molers	2:49
18.	"Makin' Friends"	Eddie Condon & His Footwarmers	3:00
19.	"The Minor Drag"	Fats Waller & His Buddies	2:39
20.	"Log Cabin Blues"	Clarence Williams' Washboard Five	3:11
21.	"South"	Benny Moten's Kansas City Orchestra	2:33
22.	"Creole Love Call"	Duke Ellington & His Orchestra	3:12
23.	"Hot and Anxious"	Don Redman & His Orchestra	2:49
24.	"New King Porter Stomp"	Fletcher Henderson & His Orchestra	3:06
