= 2022 in Sudan =

- Decades: 2000s; 2010s; 2020s
- See also: Other events of 2022; History of Sudan

The following lists events that happened during 2022 in Sudan.

== Incumbents ==
- Chairman of the Sovereignty Council: Abdel Fattah al-Burhan
- Prime Minister: Abdalla Hamdok (until 2 January), then Osman Hussein (from 19 January, acting)

== Events ==
- 9–10 April – Tangi and Bir Dagig massacres kill twelve people in West Darfur.
- August – 2022 Sudan floods
- 16 August – A Sudanese official reports that 66 people have been killed and 24,000 homes and buildings have been damaged since flooding began in June.
- 15 October – Five people are killed, and nine others are injured in tribal clashes in West Kordofan.
- 21 October – Over 150 people are killed in ethnic clashes in Sudan.
- 23 October – The death toll from the clashes over a land dispute between the Hausa and the Berta ethnic groups in Blue Nile, Sudan, increases to 220. It is one of the deadliest incident of ethnic violence in the country during the last years.
- 27 December – Sixteen people are killed when a bus collides with a dump truck on the outskirts of Omdurman, Khartoum.

== Sports ==
- Sudan at the 2021 Islamic Solidarity Games
- Sudan at the 2022 World Aquatics Championships
- Sudan at the 2022 World Athletics Championships
