= Muhammad al-Fayturi =

Sudanese and Libyan writer and playwright

Muhammad Al-Fayturi
- Born: Muhammed Miftah Rajab Al-Fayturi; 1936; Al Geneina, Anglo-Egyptian Sudan
- Died: 24 April 2015 (aged 78–79); Rabat, Morocco
- Education: Al-Azhar University, Cairo University
- Occupations: Journalist, poet, writer, ambassador
- Spouse(s): Rajat Armaze Al-Fayturi; Asia Abdelmajid

Muhammad al-Fayturi, also spelled Muhammad al-Fītūrī (Arabic: محمد الفيتوري), was a Sudanese–Libyan poet writer, poet, playwright, and ambassador.

== Biography ==
Al-Fayturi was born in 1936 in Al Geneina and his paternal family belonged to the Masalit people. His father was a Sufi sheikh of Libyan descent, and his mother was Egyptian.

He grew up in Alexandria, Egypt, and studied Islamic sciences, philosophy and history at Al-Azhar University until 1953, and then continued his studies in literature at Cairo University. After this, he joined the Institute of Political Science in Cairo.

Al-Fayturi started writing classical Arabic poetry at the age of 13 and became one of the major figures of contemporary Arabic poetry

== Career ==
Al-Fayturi worked as a journalist, and later, newspaper editor at the age of 17. Moreover, he was an acclaimed poet, and also was appointed as diplomat, political and cultural counsellor, and then as ambassador of Libya in several countries, including Lebanon and Morocco. From 1968–1970, he was appointed as an expert for the Arab League. He was also a member of the Arab Writers Union.

In 1953 he published his first collection of poems entitled 'Aga'nni Afriqia' (in English: 'Songs of Africa').

== Death ==
Al-Fayturi died in Rabat, Morocco, in 2015. In an obituary, the Lebanese newspaper The Daily Star wrote: "His work particularly draws upon his experience as an African living among Arabs, and thus addresses issues such as race, class and colonialism."

== Selected works ==
Poetry

- Aga'nni Afriqia, Arabic أغاني إفريقيا or The Songs of Africa, poetry collection, published 1956.
- Ashiq meen Afriqia, Arabic عاشق من إفريقيا Lover from Africa poetry collection, 1964.
- Azkor'inni Yaa Afriqia, Arabic اذكريني يا إفريقيا, or Remember Me Africa, poetry collection, 1965.
- Seqoe't Dobshliem, Arabic سقوط دبشليم, or Collapse of Doapashalim, poetry collection, 1968.
- Ma'zoffa lee Darawessh Matagool, Arabic معزوفة لدرويش متجول, or The Lyric of Roaming Dervish, poetry collection 1969.
- Al-battel w'el thorra w'el Mshnaqeh, Arabic البطل والثورة والمشنقة or Hero, Revolution and Gallows, 1972 poetry collection.
- Agawall Shahid Atheba't, Arabic أقوال شاهد إثبات, or The Saying of Witness, poetry, 1973.
- Abtasami hatta tamo'r el-khail, Arabic ابتسمي حتى تمر الخيل, or Smile Until The Horses Passes, poetry, 1975.
- Aesfoort el' daam, Arabic عصفورة الدم, or Bloody Bird, poetry, 1983.

Theatrical plays

- Solara, Arabic سولارا, drama, 1970.
- Thorrat Omer El-mokhata'r, Arabic ثورة عمر المختار, or The Revolution of Omer El-Mokhata'r, drama, 1974

Nonfiction

- Allam Al-Sahafa al-arabia wa-al Ajnabiya, Arabic عالم الصحافة العربية والأجنبية, in English: The World of Arab and Foreign Journalism, Damascus, 1981.
- Al-moojab wa-al s'alieb. Arabic الموجب والسالب في الصحافة العربية, in English: The Positive and Negative in Arabic Journalism, Damascus, 1986.

== See also ==
- Modern Arabic literature
- Sudanese literature
