= The Rough Guide to the Music of North Africa =

Compilation album by Various artists
- Released: 18 November 1997
- Genre: World, North African music
- Length: 67:43
- Label: World Music Network

Full series chronology
The Rough Guide to the Music of Zimbabwe (1996)	The Rough Guide to the Music of North Africa (1997)	The Rough Guide to Classic Jazz (1997)

The Rough Guide to the Music of North Africa is a world music compilation album originally released in 1997. Part of the World Music Network Rough Guides series, the album contains five Algerian tracks, five Egyptian, two Sudanese, and two Moroccan, focusing mainly on modern music but including some traditional works. The compilation was produced by Phil Stanton, co-founder of the World Music Network.

Adam Greenberg of AllMusic gave the album four stars, calling it a "rather comprehensive" overview of the region's genres and a "worthwhile listen." Michaelangelo Matos, writing for the Chicago Reader, called the album's tracks "effortlessly tuneful", stating "this is what college radio in the Sudan should sound like."

== Track listing ==
No.	Title	Artist (Country)	Length
1.	"M'Hainek Ya Galbi"	Cheb Kader (Algeria)	4:50
2.	"Douni el Bladi"	Cheb Mami (Algeria)	5:22
3.	"Habibi"	Ali Hassan Kuban (Egypt)	4:19
4.	"Lama Bada Yata Sama"	Hossam Shaker (Egypt)	3:44
5.	"Tahrimni Minnak"	Abdel Aziz El Mubarak (Sudan)	6:44
6.	"Dannab"	Abdel Karim el Kabli (Sudan)	5:13
7.	"Ashranda"	Hamza El Din (Egypt)	4:53
8.	"Mambo el Soudani"	Salamat (Egypt)	4:04
9.	"Maqsoum"	Mahmoud Fadl (Egypt)	2:38
10.	"Koubou Koubou"	Cheb Khaled (Algeria)	7:40
11.	"La Vérité"	Chaba Fadela & Cheb Sahraoui (Algeria)	6:20
12.	"Bechri Lina"	Adnan Sefiani (Morocco)	7:04
13.	"Vent de la Montagne/Six Sous"	Houria Aïchi (Algeria)	3:05
14.	"Nikriz"	Hassan Erraji (Morocco)	5:02

Professional ratings
Review scores
Source	Rating
Allmusic	4/5 stars
