= Bahjaa Abdelaa Abdelaa =

Sudanese human rights activist (1997–2023)

- Born: 1997; Nyala, South Darfur
- Died: 26 October 2023 (aged 25–26)
- Citizenship: Sudan
- Education: University of Khartoum
- Occupation: Activist

Bahjaa Abdelaa Abdelaa (Arabic: بهجة عبد الله عبد الله; c. 1997–2023) was a Sudanese human rights activist. Known for her monitoring of rape cases in Darfur, she was killed by an alleged member of the Rapid Support Forces after previously receiving threats for her activism.

== Biography ==
Abdelaa was born in Nyala, South Darfur. She attended the University of Khartoum, where she graduated with a degree in economics in 2020. Abdelaa later returned to Nyala in order to care for her mother.

Abdelaa was a member of the Women Revolutionary Group, based in Darfur, which advocated for women's rights, gender equality and social justice. In addition, it also offered support and advice to victims of rape and sexual violence. Abdelaa became known for her work monitoring and reporting on cases of rape against women in South Darfur, including the prevalence of wartime sexual violence during the War in Darfur and the Sudanese civil war. Abdelaa was also a member of the Darfur Collection of Women Human Rights Defenders.

In May 2023, Abdelaa reported to Front Line Defenders, an Irish charity that supports human rights activists, that she had received death threats linked to her activism, and in particular her reporting on sexual violence. Abdelaa reportedly refused to leave Nyala due to her caring commitments to her mother.

On 26 October 2023, Abdelaa was shot and killed while attending a relative's funeral at the Kalma camp for internally displaced people in Nyala. She was 26. While it was reported that the shooter's identity was unknown, they were subsequently alleged to have been a member of the Rapid Support Forces.

Front Line Defenders condemned Abdelaa's killing, which they stated was linked to her peaceful human rights work in Darfur. It called on Sudanese authorities to carry out an impartial and independent investigation into her death, and to guarantee the safety of human rights activists working across Sudan.

On 8 March 2024, during a debate in the House of Lords, the upper house of the Parliament of the United Kingdom, to commemorate International Women's Day, Ruth Anderson, Baroness Anderson of Stoke-on-Trent, named Abdelaa while discussing women who had been killed as a result of their human rights activism.
