= Nyala University =

University in Nyala, South Darfur-Sudan

- جامعة نيالا
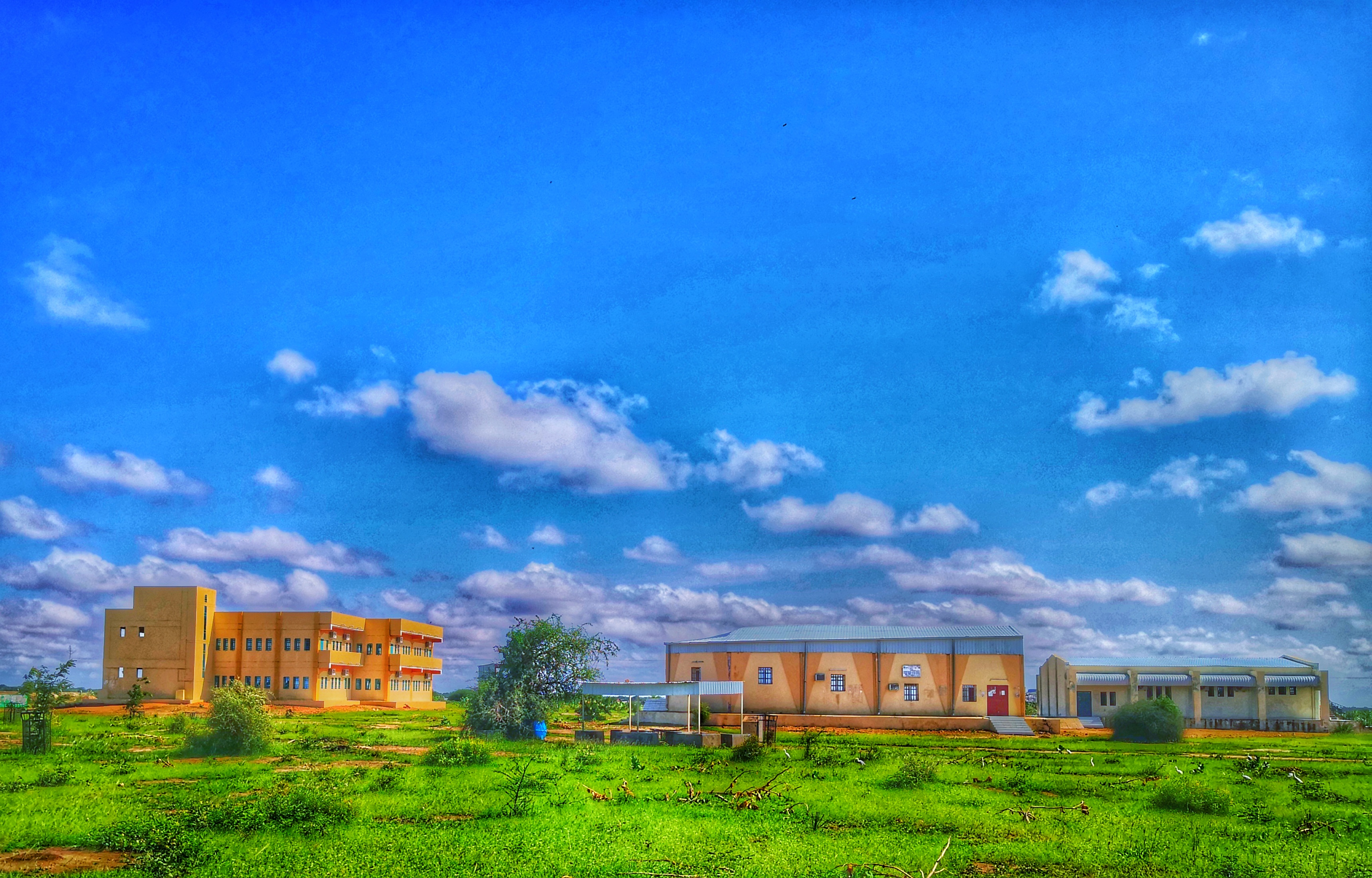
- Type: Public
- Established: 1994; 32 years ago
- Location: Nyala, South Darfur, Sudan
- Website: nyalau.edu.sd

Nyala University is a public university located in Nyala in South Darfur, Sudan. It is a member of the Federation of the Universities of the Islamic World and of the Association of African Universities.

== See also ==
- Education in Sudan
