= Abdel Aziz El Mubarak =

Sudanese popular musician (1951–2020)

- Born: 1951; Wad Madani, Sudan
- Died: 9 February 2020 (aged 69); Cairo, Egypt
- Genres: Music of Sudan, Arabic pop music
- Occupation(s): Singer and band leader
- Instrument(s): Oud, Vocals
- Years active: 1985–2020
- Labels: Globe Style, World Circuit

Abdel Aziz El Mubarak (Arabic: عبد العزيز المبارك; 1951 – 9 February 2020) was a popular Sudanese singer, born in Wad Madani. He was known for his popular love songs, pleasing tenor voice and his large band. Especially from the 1970s to the 80s, he was one of the most successful musicians during the Golden Years of Sudanese popular music.

Apart from Sudanese musical traditions, he was influenced by reggae and American rhythm and blues. In addition to releasing many cassette recordings and playing at weddings and other gigs in Sudan, he and his band also recorded several CDs for the European and American market and toured internationally. He also performed solo, accompanying his singing on the oud.

== Biography and artistic career ==
Abdel Aziz El Mubarak started singing and performing as a student, while still attending school in his hometown. After this, he studied music at the Institute for Music and Drama at Sudan University in Khartoum and worked for the Ministry of Culture in Wad Madani, before he migrated to Jeddah, Saudi Arabia, for several years where he also recorded many songs.

His first artistic tour outside of Sudan led him to Romania in 1976, and in 1988, he became the first Sudanese musician to perform at the Womad arts festival at Glastonbury, United Kingdom. He also performed on several tours in the United Kingdom, Italy, France, Germany and the Netherlands.

Every pleasure in the absence of your eyes
Is incomplete and does not touch me.
Every road that does not take me to you
Is a dark road that doesn't deserve the walk.
Darling, all through my life
I have been longing for your smile.

— "Ya A'asal" on album Straight from the Heart. Transl: Moawia Yassin

Together with a song by Abdel Karim el Kabli, he was one of two Sudanese musicians featured on the world music compilation album The Rough Guide to the Music of North Africa.

== Discography ==
Abdel Aziz El Mubarak on Discogs

Albums

- 1986: Songs From The City (World Circuit)
- 1987: Tahrimni Minnak (Globe Style Records)
- 1985: Straight From The Heart (World Circuit)
- 1995: Abdel Aziz El Mubarak (Globe Style Records)

Contributing artist

- 2008: Sounds of Sudan (World Circuit)
- 2013: The Rough Guide to the Music of North Africa (World Music Network)

== See also ==
- Music of Sudan
