= Arbaat Dam collapse =

Dam failure and resulting flooding in Sudan

- Date: 24 August 2024
- Location: Port Sudan, Red Sea State, Sudan
- Cause: Severe rainfall and floodwaters
- Deaths: 148+
- Injuries: 170+
- Missing: 150–200
- Property damage: One dam collapsed; 20 villages destroyed; Houses of 50,000 residents damaged/destroyed

The Arbaat Dam, north of Port Sudan, Sudan, collapsed on 24 August 2024, killing at least 148 people with many more missing. The collapse was triggered by severe rainfall, consequent flooding and bad maintenance of the dam.

== Background ==
The Arbaat Dam was located 38 kilometres (24 mi) to the northwest of the Red Sea city of Port Sudan, and was part of Sudan's floodwater management infrastructure. Maintenance works on the dam were last held in 2017. The Arbaat Dam also acted as the primary freshwater supply for Port Sudan, which became the acting capital of Sudan following the beginning of fighting in Khartoum between government forces and the Rapid Support Forces during the ongoing Sudanese civil war. Port Sudan contains the nation's primary Red Sea port and actively running airport, and received the majority of foreign humanitarian aid supplies to provide relief to Sudanese citizens and internally displaced persons impacted by the civil war.

In 2024, Sudan experienced flooding caused by heavy rainfall. Flooding beginning in July caused the deaths of at least twelve people, with seven more people injured and at least 12,506 people in total affected.

== Collapse ==
Sudanese officials reported that the Arbaat Dam began to crumble as a result of prolonged heavy rainfall arriving earlier relative to the onset of seasonal rainfall in prior years. In addition, the rainfall caused silt to build up on the dam.

In 2019 a study from the World Bank proposed to repair the dam. The study evaluated the impact of building a new outlet arrangement at Arbaat Dam assuming that the reservoir will not be dredged completely, and new bottom outlets will be built at a higher level, corresponding to the design of the dam in 2013. The study proposed to remove the accumulated silt in front of the dam. It proposed also to build a new dam upstream the existing dam. In this context the collapse of the dam can be seen as a result of bad maintenance of the dam.

In the evening of 24 August 2024, the Arbaat Dam collapsed as a result of damages caused by exceptional rainfall, causing the entire dam reservoir to empty and begin to flood areas downstream of it. Eyewitnesses reported that several lorries carrying civilians and elderly, children, and families were trapped and swept away by the subsequent floodwaters, and that several homes were also swept away by the resulting torrent. Dozens more were reported missing. Several residents were forced to climb up hilltops to higher ground in order to escape the rising floods. Seven vehicles at the dam were also swept away, along with a group of miners preparing to cross over it.

Precise details about the dam's collapse were difficult to retrieve due to the damages caused by the collapse and flooding to regional telecommunications networks as well as the destruction of roads leading to the site of the disaster. The flooding was worsened by rainfall in the Cooper Dolabiyai area, causing more regions near the collapsed dam to be submerged.

== Impact ==
The United Nations reported that the homes of roughly 50,000 civilians were severely damaged or destroyed by the floodwaters. Seventy villages were impacted by the flash flooding, and of these, twenty villages in the region were destroyed. Many regions east of the dam were rendered inaccessible due to damages destroying roads leading to them which also resulted in 100 families being stranded. Out of 65,000 people constituting 13,000 families living west of the dam, the homes of approximately 50,000 people constituting 10,000 families were significantly damaged or destroyed. Eighty-four boreholes collapsed; ten thousand livestock animals were reported as missing; widespread power outages were reported, and seventy schools were significantly damaged or destroyed. Floodwaters from the reservoir carried large amounts of silt that destroyed large stretches of agricultural land and resulted in greater damage to infrastructure and residences.

A first responder reported seeing deceased gold miners and mining equipment scattered by the flooding. Based on first responder testimony, 150 to 200 people were missing. Over 170 more people were injured.

Port Sudan and the area surrounding it could suffer from severe drinking water shortages due to the collapse of the dam emptying the region's water supply and damaging or destroying water infrastructure. Red Sea State head of water resources Amr Eissa Taher referred to the damage caused by the subsequent flooding as "extensive". The Red Sea State Health Ministry stated that they expected a rise in health issues due to water contamination and disease outbreaks resulting in conditions such as cholera or diarrhea.

== Response ==
Abdel Fattah al-Burhan, Sudan's military leader, visited the affected areas on 25 August. Major General Qureshi Hussein stated that recovery operations were conducted using trained divers to recover bodies in deep water near the remains of the Arbaat Dam.

== See also ==
- Derna dam collapses
- Patel Dam failure
- Gusau Dam
- 2024 South Sudan floods
