= Asia Abdelmajid =

Sudanese actress and teacher (1942–2023)

- آسيا عبد الماجد
- Born: Asia Mohammed Tom Taher Al-Katiabi; 1943; Omdurman, Anglo-Egyptian Sudan
- Died: 3 May 2023 (aged 79–80); Khartoum, Sudan
- Education: Academy of Arts (Egypt)
- Occupations: Theatrical actress and teacher
- Employer: Sudan TV
- Spouse: Muhammad al-Fayturi

Asia Mohammed Tom Taher Al-Katiabi, also known as Asia Abdelmajid (Arabic: آسيا عبد الماجد; 1943 – 3 May 2023), was a Sudanese theatrical actress and teacher. She was one of Sudan's first professional actors and received acclaim for her stage performances. She was the widow of the poet Muhammad al-Fayturi and was killed in crossfire during the war in Sudan on 3 May 2023.

== Early life and education ==
Asia Mohammed Tom Taher Al-Katiabi was born in 1943 in Omdurman, Sudan, to Batoul Mohammed Ahmed Al-Sheikh Al-Jali. The Al-Katiabi family included other notable creators such as the poet Al-Tijani Yusuf Bashir and Abdul Qadir Al-Ktiabi. She was raised by her relative, Abdul Majid, who was like a second father, and she took his name.

She studied at Abdel Moneim primary school in Khartoum, then at Karary Middle School. In 1959, she joined the Teachers College in Omdurman, and worked as a teacher in the same college after graduating in 1962. In 1968, she went to Egypt to study acting at the Academy of Arts in Cairo and graduated in 1972. She was the top of her cohort which included Ahmed Zaki, Ahmed Abdel Warth, Ahmed Maher, Samira Mohsen, Shahira and Afaf Shuaib. Further, she received her master's degree from the Khartoum International Institute for Arabic Education and Further Studies, and during her studies in Cairo, she participated in a minor role in the play Al-Bakashin in the Khiam Theater starring Farid Shawqi.

== Career ==
Asia Abdelmajid loved acting since her childhood when she acted the stories of primary-level books. At Karary School, she joined the Acting Association under her teacher Buthaina Khaled, to present Arabic and international theatrical plays such as Shajar al-Durr, Cleopatra and Cinderella. Sometimes, she even appeared in male roles in plays. She was admired by Fatima Ahmed Ibrahim, who wrote an article about her in the magazine Voice of Women.

When Sudan TV began operating in 1963, Asia was participating in the community theatre with Helmy Ibrahim and others. In addition, she was part of a Ramadan series with Al-Fadl Saeed which was presented live. The series was done free of charge for two consecutive years because there was no budget.

In 1965, in celebration of the one-year anniversary of the October Revolution, she presented the play Pamseeka, which was the first play to be shown on the stage of the new National Stage in Omdurman. She played the leading role and the press called her ”Sudan’s first actress".

== Death ==
Abdelmajid died on the evening of 3 May 2023 from wounds caused by shrapnel of a shell that fell on her house in Khartoum during early clashes in the war between the Sudanese Armed Forces and the Rapid Support Forces. She was buried within hours of shooting in the grounds of a kindergarten where she worked, because it was too dangerous to take her to a cemetery.
