= Magda Kandil =

Egyptian economist (1958–2020)

Magda ElSayed Kandil
- ماجدة السيد قنديل
- Born: 5 May 1958; Egypt
- Died: 17 June 2020 (aged 62); Abu Dhabi, United Arab Emirates

Academic background
- Education: Cairo University; University of Notre Dame; Washington State University
- Doctoral advisor: Jo Anna Gray

Magda ElSayed Kandil (Arabic: ماجدة السيد قنديل; 5 May 1958 – 17 June 2020) was an Egyptian economist, and most notably the chief economist and head of the research and statistics department at the Central Bank of the United Arab Emirates. Previously she was a senior economist at the International Monetary Fund (IMF) and a professor at University of Wisconsin–Milwaukee.

She was on the editorial board of the Journal of Economic Studies and Management Decision.

== Education and career ==
She graduated with a Bachelor of Science in economics from Cairo University in 1978. She then obtained an M.A. from the University of Notre Dame in 1982 and a Master of Business Administration from Indiana University South Bend in 1984. In 1988, she received her Doctor of Philosophy from Washington State University. From 1992 to 1999, she was professor and economics department chair at the University of Wisconsin–Milwaukee.

In 1999, she joined the International Monetary Fund as Advisor to executive director. She then obtained successive promotions and in 2013, she was nominated as Senior Economist for the Eastern II Division in the African Department. She was the Chief Economist and Head of Research and Statistics Department at the Central Bank of the United Arab Emirates.

Kandil died on 17 June 2020 in Abu Dhabi.

== Research ==
Her research focuses on Macroeconomics, International Economics and growth economics. She has published in the Journal of Macroeconomics, the Journal of Economics and Business, the Southern Economic Journal, the Journal of International Money and Finance and Applied Economics.

She is the 87th most cited woman in economics according to the ranking on IDEAS.

Her research has been featured in The Washington Post, The Wall Street Journal, Reuters, The Jerusalem Post, Aljazeera, The Saudi Gazette, The New York Times, and CNBC.

=== Selected bibliography ===
- Kandil, Magda; Woods, Jeffrey G. (1995). "A cross-industry examination of the Lucas misperceptions model". Journal of Macroeconomics. 17 (1): pages 55–76.
- Kandil, Magda (1997-02-01). "What differentiates industrial business cycles? A cross-country investigation". Applied Economics. 29 (2): pages 197–212.
- Ben Naceur, Samy; Kandil, Magda (2009-01-01). "The impact of capital requirements on banks' cost of intermediation and performance: The case of Egypt". Journal of Economics and Business. 61 (1): pages 70–89.
- Kandil, Magda (2001). "Variation in the Effects of Aggregate Demand Shocks: Evidence and Implications across Industrial Countries". Southern Economic Journal. 67 (3): page 552.
