= 2019 in Sudan =

- Decades: 1990s; 2000s; 2010s; 2020s
- See also: Other events of 2019; History of Sudan

The following events occurred in Sudan in 2019.

== Incumbents ==
- President: Omar al-Bashir
- Prime Minister: Motazz Moussa
- Vice President:
  - Bakri Hassan Saleh (First)
  - Osman Kebir (Second)

== Ongoing ==
- 2018–2019 Sudanese protests.
- War in Darfur continues.

== Events ==
11 April – President Omar al-Bashir was overthrown in a coup d'état by the Sudanese Armed Forces.

== Deaths ==
- 17 January – Babiker Awadalla, politician, 7th Prime Minister of Sudan (b. 1917).
