= Al Geneina District =

Al Geneina
- District
- Country: Sudan
- State: West Darfur

Population (2008)
  - Total: 252,744

Al Geneina is a district of West Darfur state, Sudan.

Fighting between Masalit people and Arab nomads in Al Geneina District leaves 84 dead and 160 wounded, including soldiers on 16 January 2021. This is two weeks after the United Nations withdrew its peacekeepers from the region after 13 years.
