= Mubarak al Fadil al Mahdi =

Sudanese politician

Mubarak Abdullahi El-Fadil El-Mahdi (born Khartoum, Sudan, 1950, commonly known as Mubarak El-Fadil) is an economist and prominent Sudanese politician. He was appointed to several political and executive positions as part of the National Umma Party Sudan in the democratic Government of Sudan during the period 1986-1989.

== Politics ==
In 2017, Al-Mahdi indicated he would not object to normal diplomatic relations between Sudan and Israel. He was also critical of Palestine's role in the Israeli–Palestinian conflict.
