= Mellit District =

Mellit
- District
- Mellit district (1.) in North Darfur
- Country: Sudan
- State: North Darfur
- Control: Rapid Support Forces

Population (2008)
  - Total: 135,831

Mellit is a district of North Darfur state, Sudan. Its population was 135,831 in 2008.

The Rapid Support Forces captured the town in April 2024, as part of the War in Sudan.
