= Nyala, Sudan =

Nyala نيالا
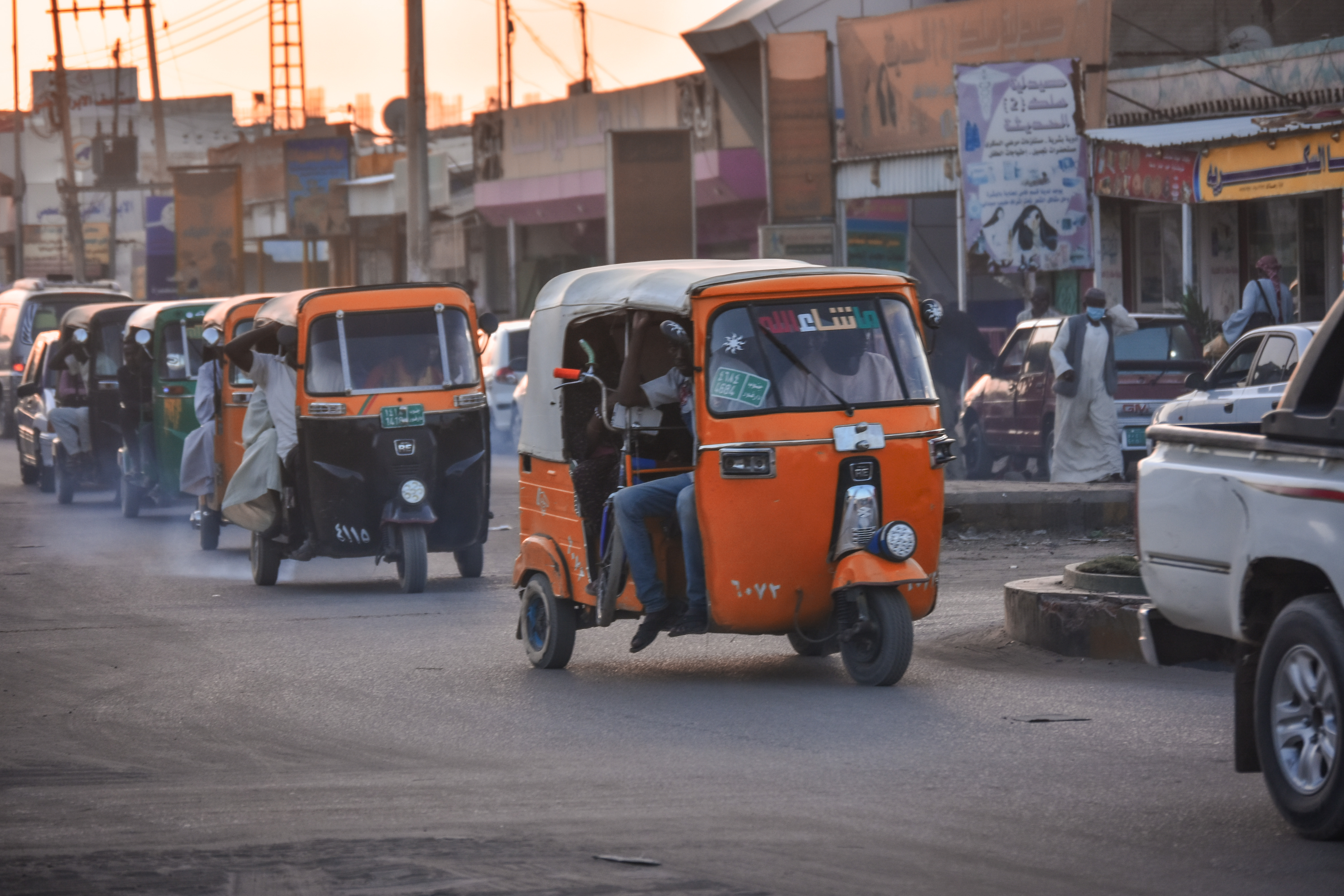
- Cinema street, Nyala

- Location in Sudan
- Coordinates: 12°2′11″N 24°52′37″E
- Country: Sudan
- State: South Darfur
- Control: Rapid Support Forces
- Elevation: 2,208 ft (673 m)

Population (2025)
  - Metro: 1,145,590

Nyala (Daju: "the place of chatting"; Arabic: نيالا) is a city and the capital of the state of South Darfur in the south-west of Sudan, with an estimated population of 1,100,000 in 2024.

== History ==
Nyala was the capital of the Daju Empire, which was established around Jebel Um-Kurdós. However, many sites of ancient antiquities, pottery, engraved pictures of battles, horses, animals and hunting are still awaiting further scientific archaeological work at Jebel Daju. The most important archaeological sites discovered yet are Nari, Kedingnyir, Dobo, Simiat Hills, Jebel Keima, Kalokitting, Jebel Wara, and Jebel Marra itself.

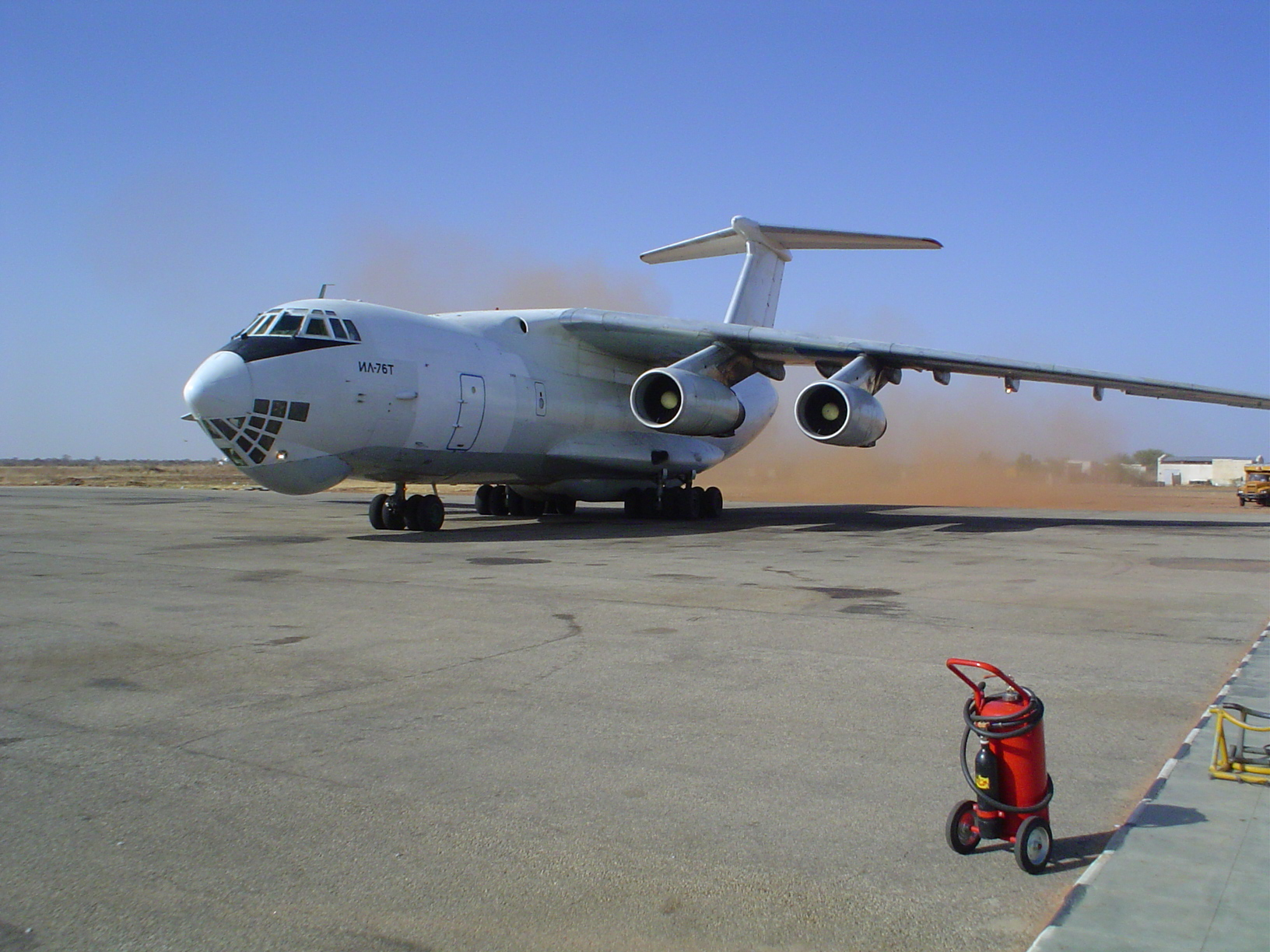
Nyala Airport

When the United Kingdom conquered present-day Sudan, the British commander-in-chief met Sultan Adam Suleiman in 1932, seeking his advice for his knowledge of the best places in terms of availability of water sources and land topography in order to establish the British Administration Headquarters in Darfur. Sultan Adam Suleiman had chosen Nyala for that purpose.

=== Darfur conflict ===
During the Darfur conflict, thousands of internally displaced persons have gathered near the city in the hopes of protection. The refugee camp in the southern portion of Nyala is Kalma. Around 90,000 people resided in the camp.

=== Sudan war ===
In April 2023, the east of the city and the airport were captured by the RSF during the Sudanese civil war. Afterwards, satellite images captured neighbouring villages destroyed by the militias, as well as parts of Nyala. According to local activists, over 600,000 people have been displaced from the region and are unable to receive humanitarian aid due to the fighting. While a ceasefire was declared, fighting occasionally broke out in the city throughout May. On 26 October, reports stated that RSF took control of Nyala, as the conflict forced more than 670,000 people to flee their homes.

== Economy ==
Local industries produce textiles, as well as processed food and leather goods. Nyala has terminus ends for both road and railway, and also has a domestic airport, Nyala Airport. Nyala serves as a trading place for gum arabic and has branches of the Agricultural Bank of Sudan and the People's Cooperative Bank. Nyala is home to Nyala University, a public university.

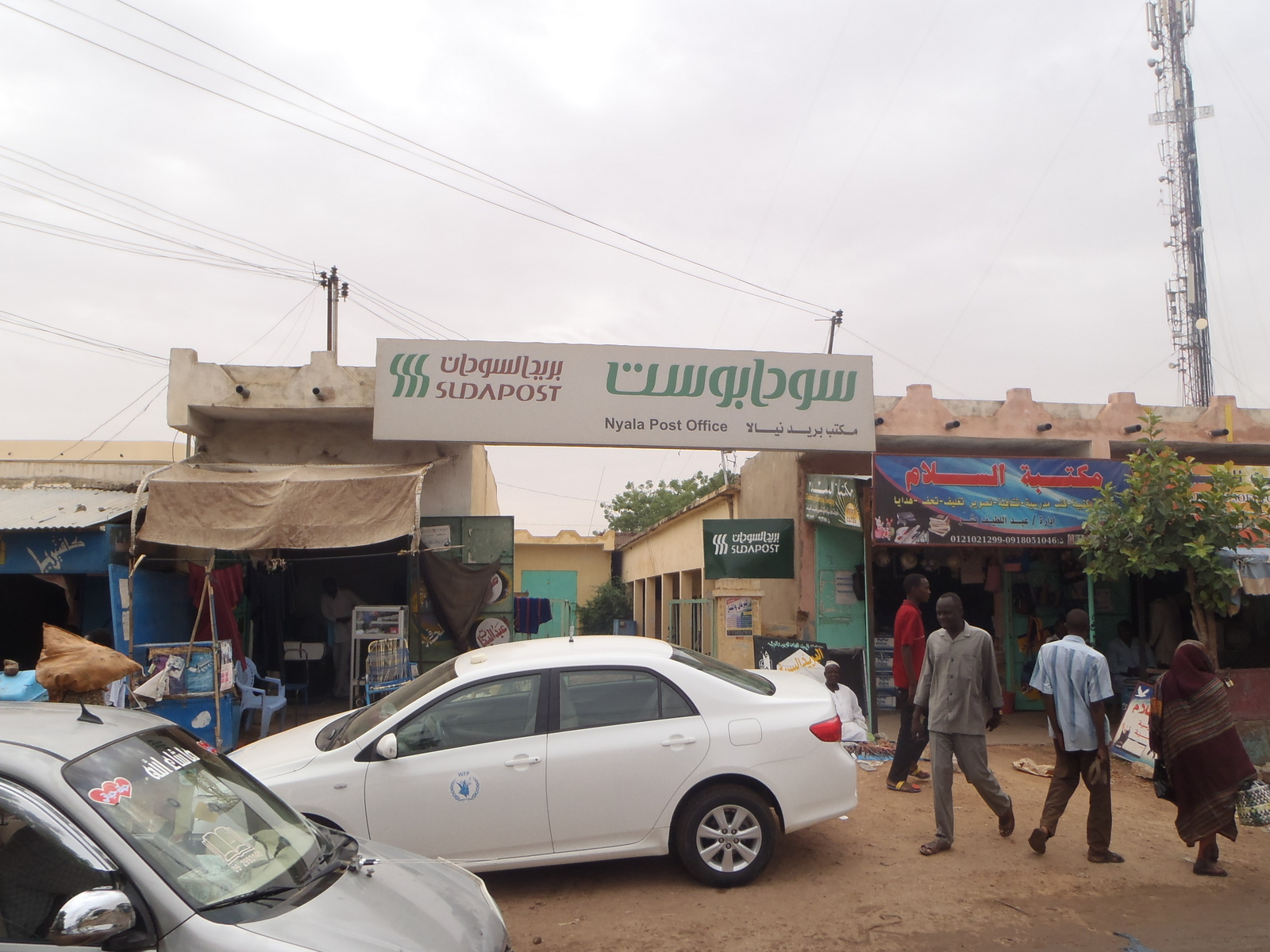
Market street with post office in Nyala, South Darfur, Sudan

== Water infrastructure ==
Nyala suffers from severe water infrastructure problems caused by droughts and poor water management, including poor source treatment and delivery methods. Most of the water used in and around Nyala is ground water; this is heavily contaminated due to human activity, bearing the consequences of inadequate waste management and lack of proper sanitation. Water resources in the city have tested to contain bacteria levels higher than permissible amounts, which in turn creates health issues. In many cases the water collected for distribution is not properly chlorinated, allowing further increase in bacteria levels.

== Education ==
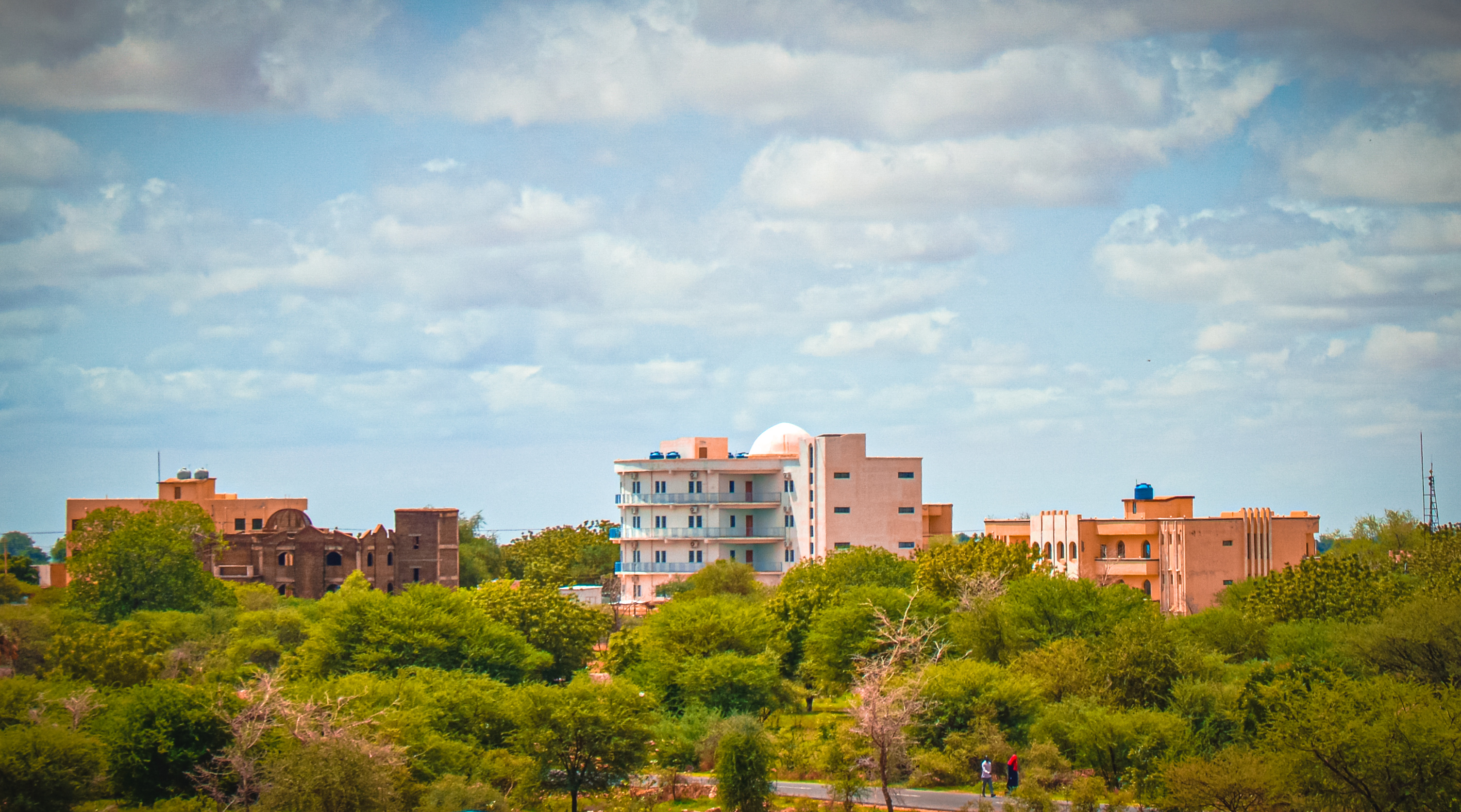
Building of the College of Engineering Sciences, the Central Library and the Mosque, Nyala

The educational institutions in the country nearly doubled between the years of 2000 and 2010. In the year 2000 there were 135 primary schools and 58 secondary schools; in 2010 there were 308 primary schools and 106 secondary schools. The main concern with the educational system in the city is the quality of the education. The schools’ staff is underpaid and unqualified for adequate teaching in these institutions. The government often does not commit to their financial responsibility with the schools. This affects the schools’ operations and burdens the schools to invest from their resources. Also, many children do not attend school so they can work and add to their family’s income.

== Climate ==
Despite receiving almost 430 millimetres or 17 inches of rainfall annually, owing to the extremely high potential evapotranspiration Nyala has only a very marginal hot semi-arid climate (Köppen BSh), just above a hot arid climate (BWh).

Climate data for Nyala (1991–2020 normals, extremes 1920–2020
Month	Jan	Feb	Mar	Apr	May	Jun	Jul	Aug	Sep	Oct	Nov	Dec	Year
Record high °C (°F)	40.4 (104.7)	41.9 (107.4)	45.6 (114.1)	43.5 (110.3)	45.5 (113.9)	42.8 (109.0)	43.3 (109.9)	39.6 (103.3)	40 (104)	39.6 (103.3)	40.2 (104.4)	40.2 (104.4)	45.6 (114.1)
Mean daily maximum °C (°F)	30.4 (86.7)	33.4 (92.1)	36.5 (97.7)	39.0 (102.2)	39.1 (102.4)	37.1 (98.8)	33.8 (92.8)	32.2 (90.0)	34.0 (93.2)	35.8 (96.4)	34.1 (93.4)	31.2 (88.2)	34.7 (94.5)
Daily mean °C (°F)	23.1 (73.6)	25.8 (78.4)	29.0 (84.2)	31.6 (88.9)	32.1 (89.8)	30.8 (87.4)	28.5 (83.3)	27.3 (81.1)	28.2 (82.8)	29.1 (84.4)	27.2 (81.0)	23.9 (75.0)	28.0 (82.4)
Mean daily minimum °C (°F)	15.7 (60.3)	18.2 (64.8)	21.5 (70.7)	24.2 (75.6)	25.0 (77.0)	24.6 (76.3)	23.1 (73.6)	22.4 (72.3)	22.4 (72.3)	22.5 (72.5)	20.2 (68.4)	16.6 (61.9)	21.4 (70.5)
Record low °C (°F)	6 (43)	9 (48)	10.5 (50.9)	14.9 (58.8)	15.5 (59.9)	14.2 (57.6)	14 (57)	15.9 (60.6)	15.2 (59.4)	12.7 (54.9)	10 (50)	7 (45)	6 (43)
Average rainfall mm (inches)	0.0 (0.0)	0.0 (0.0)	0.0 (0.0)	1.0 (0.04)	17.5 (0.69)	50.7 (2.00)	116.7 (4.59)	141.6 (5.57)	80.8 (3.18)	19.3 (0.76)	0.0 (0.0)	0.0 (0.0)	427.6 (16.83)
Average rainy days (≥ 1.0 mm)	0.0	0.0	0.0	0.2	2.0	4.3	8.9	10.4	6.2	2.0	0.0	0.0	33.9
Average relative humidity (%)	18	14	12	15	28	45	62	70	62	36	20	19	33
Mean monthly sunshine hours	285.2	260.4	263.5	246.0	244.9	216.0	201.5	182.9	213.0	291.4	297.0	300.7	3,002.5
Source 1: NOAA
Source 2: Meteo Climat (record highs and lows)

== Governmental Capitol ==
From 25 July 2025 Nyala has served as the administrative seat of the Sudanese Transitional Peace Government (Government of Peace and Unity). Local authorities say policing has resumed under the banner of the "Federal Police". RSF graduated a military police cohort tasked with public security and crime control. Traders report the main market has now reopened following a nearly 2 year shut down. Engineering teams have converted the ministry of agriculture, personal status court, and land registry into offices for the prime minister and presidential council.

== Notable residents ==
- Bahjaa Abdelaa Abdelaa, human rights activist.

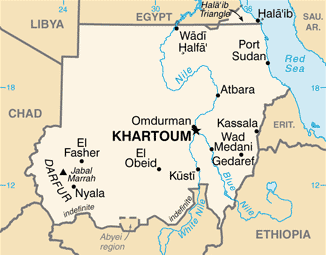
Nyala in western Sudan (bottom left)

- Ala Kheir, photographer, cinematographer, and mechanical engineer
- Hafiz Abdelrahman, flutist
- Omer Ihsas
