= 2016 in Sudan =

- Decades: 1990s; 2000s; 2010s; 2020s
- See also: Other events of 2016; History of Sudan

The following lists events that happened during 2016 in Sudan.

== Incumbents ==
- President: Omar al-Bashir
- Vice President:
  - Bakri Hassan Saleh (First)
  - Hassabu Mohamed Abdalrahman (Second)

== Ongoing ==
- War in Darfur
- 2016 Sudanese protests

== Sports ==
- 5–21 August – Sudan at the 2016 Summer Olympics: 6 competitors in 3 sports

== Deaths ==
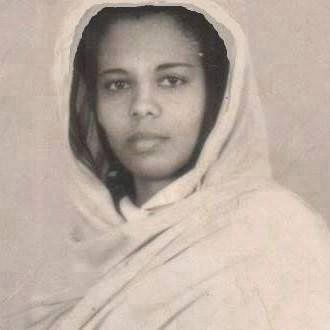
Zeinab Elobeid Yousif

- 5 March – Hassan Al-Turabi, religious and political leader (b. 1932).
- 19 March – Zeinab Elobeid Yousif, aircraft engineer (b. 1952).
- 4 August – Saeed Madibo, Sudanese politician (b. 1928).
