= 2013 in Sudan =

- Decades: 1990s; 2000s; 2010s; 2020s
- See also: Other events of 2013; History of Sudan

The following lists events during 2013 in the Republic of the Sudan.

== Incumbents ==
- President: Omar al-Bashir
- Vice President:
  - Ali Osman Taha (First, until December 6); then Bakri Hassan Saleh (from December 7)
  - Al-Haj Adam Youssef (Second, until December 7); then Hassabu Mohamed Abdalrahman

== Events ==
- 2011–2013 Sudanese protests
- August – 2013 Sudan floods
- October 27–29 – Abyei status referendum

== Sports ==
- 2013 Kagame Interclub Cup
- 2013 Sudan Premier League
- Sudan at the 2013 World Aquatics Championships
- Sudan at the 2013 World Championships in Athletics

== Art and entertainment ==
- List of Sudanese submissions for the Academy Award for Best International Feature Film
