= 2012 in Sudan =

- Decades: 1990s; 2000s; 2010s; 2020s
- See also: Other events of 2012; History of Sudan

The following lists events during 2012 in the Republic of the Sudan.

== Incumbents ==
- President: Omar al-Bashir
- Vice President: Ali Osman Taha

== Events ==
- Ongoing: 2011–2013 Sudanese protests
- 15 January: South Sudan accuses neighboring Sudan of "stealing" its oil exports.
- 30 January: Sudanese officials claim that the army has freed 14 of 29 Chinese workers held by Sudan People's Liberation Movement - North rebels in the South Kordofan region since last 28 January.
- 2 February: The People's Republic of China asks for assistance from South Sudan to obtain the release of 29 Chinese workers held captive in Sudan for five days.
- 11 February: Sudan and South Sudan sign a non-aggression treaty.
- 14 February: A Sudanese air strike hits the South Sudanese state of Unity, injuring four soldiers in a contested area.
- 17 February: Security forces in Sudan raid student dormitories at the University of Khartoum, arresting and beating students after they demanded the right to form a union.
- 20 February: Justice and Equality Movement rebels in Darfur release 49 UNAMID peacekeepers but retain three other people they accuse of being Sudanese security agents.
- 1 March: The International Criminal Court issues an arrest warrant for the Sudanese defence minister Abdelrahim Mohamed Hussein.
- 22 March: South Sudan invites Sudan to discuss outstanding issues next month between the two countries that nearly resulted in a war.
- 27 March: President Omar Hassan al-Bashir cancels planned meetings with the government of South Sudan following border clashes the day prior.
- 4 April: The Sudan People's Liberation Army says it shot down a Sudanese MiG-29 jet fighter in South Sudan's Unity state.
- 17 April: Sudan continues to bombard a disputed border town seized by South Sudan and claims to have seized territory as clashes spread along the border between the two states.
- 22 April: Sudan launches a fresh incursion into South Sudan.
- 24 April: Security officials in Sudan arrest three Catholic aid workers and close down the office of Caritas in South Darfur as the three were traveling to South Sudan.
- 1 May: Tensions rise between the two nations as South Sudan accuses Sudan of attacking locations in its territory.
- 2 May: The United Nations Security Council passes a resolution threatening sanctions if hostilities do not end within 48 hours.
- 22 June: Anti-austerity protests spread through Khartoum, with security forces breaking them up.
- 26 June: The police chief announces a violent crackdown on anti-government protests in Khartoum.
- 4 August: Sudan confirms an oil agreement with neighbouring South Sudan.
- 5 August: Two gunmen kill a Sudanese employee of the UN World Food Programme (WFP) in the southern border state of South Kordofan.
- 17 August: Médecins Sans Frontières state that Sudanese refugees are in 'humanitarian disaster' in South Sudan.
- 19 August: 32 people, among which Sudanese government officials, including Ghazi al-Sadiq, the head of the ministry of guidance and endowments, and two state ministers, are killed in a plane crash in Talodi.
- 14 September: Protesters angered by an anti-Islamic film denigrating the Prophet Muhammad attack the German and British embassies in Khartoum. In Khartoum, Tunis and Cairo, at least seven people die. An Egyptian fruit seller dies by rubber bullets.
- 7 October: An Antonov An-12 aircraft belonging to the Sudanese military crashes southwest of Khartoum, killing at least 13 of the 22 people on board.
- 17 October: One UNAMID peacekeeper is killed and three are wounded during an ambush in Hashaba.
- 1 November: Yellow fever kills 32 people and sickens at least 50 more in the Darfur region of Sudan.

== Sports ==
- 2012 Kagame Interclub Cup
- 2012 Sudan Premier League

== Art and entertainment ==
- List of Sudanese submissions for the Academy Award for Best International Feature Film
