= 2011 in Sudan =

- Decades: 1990s; 2000s; 2010s; 2020s
- See also: Other events of 2011; History of Sudan

The following lists events that happened during 2011 in Sudan.

== Incumbents ==
- President: Omar al-Bashir
- Vice President:
  - Salva Kiir (First, until 9 July); then Ali Osman Taha (from 13 September)
  - Ali Osman Taha (Second, until 13 September 2011); then Al-Haj Adam Youssef

== Events ==
=== January ===
- 4 January – President Omar al-Bashir has reassured that should South Sudan secede, his country will still help them in a visit to Juba.
- 5 January – A Hungarian UN peacekeeper who was abducted 90 days ago is released.
- 7 January – Thousands enter Southern Sudan from Sudan in preparation for the referendum for independence.
- 8 January – Several people are killed in clashes with security police in southern Sudan before tomorrow's independence referendum in the south.
- 9 January – People in southern Sudan vote in an independence referendum for the south.
- 10 January – Three people are killed in clashes between government forces and the Sudan Liberation Movement in northern Darfur.
- 12 January – Estimates put the turnout of the referendum for the south's independence at over 60%, passing the threshold for the result to be declared valid.
- 16 January – Southern Sudanese leader Salva Kiir calls on the people of the south to forgive the north for the civil war.
- 18 January – Three Sudanese military officers are killed in clashes with rebels in western Darfur.
- 21–21 January people are killed in clashes between government forces and rebels in Darfur. In the south, almost 99% of voters support splitting from the north.
- 25 January – The government and the Sudan Liberation Army clash for the second time in a week with claims by insurgents of shooting down helicopters killing 3. The government denies this claiming that 25 rebels were killed.
- 30 January – Hundreds of protesters take to the streets inspired by the protests in Tunisia and Egypt in Khartoum against the government, demanding resignation of President al-Bashir. The protests are met with brutal force from riot police including tear gassing and beating.
- 31 January – A student protester is killed by riot police in Khartoum. The south also declares it will secede from Sudan on 9 July 2011, after a result of 99% in favour of independence.

=== February ===
- 2 February – The Sudanese government accepts the results of the independence referendum in the south.
- 4 February – Protesters in Sennar are beaten and tear gassed by riot police.
- 5–20 February people are killed in a military shootout in Malakal in the south of the country.
- 6 February – A mutiny in the Sudanese army in the south kills 30 people.
- 9 February – Southern Sudanese minister Jimmy Lemi Milla and his bodyguard are shot dead as a result of a personal dispute.
- 10 February – The truce in the south is broken as 16 people die in clashes in the state of Jonglei.
- 11 February – The death toll from clashes between rebels loyal to George Athor and the military in southern Sudan rises to 100.
- 27 February – A demonstration against electoral fraud in Khartoum is broken up by riot police.

=== March ===
- 8 March – Rebels begin to protest after Sudan divides Darfur up into smaller states.
- 10 March – Clashes between the government and rebels in Darfur kill 17 people.
- 12 March – Southern Sudanese leaders accuse President al-Bashir of attempting overthrow their government.
- 18 March – Clashes between rebels loyal to Athor and southern Sudan's government result in 70 deaths.

=== April ===
- 24 April – 57 people are killed in clashes between the army and militia in the south.
- 28 April – President al-Bashir threatens to not recognise South Sudan if they claim the Abyei region.

=== May ===
- 5 May – The government passes a bill to approve the creation of two new states in Darfur's existing three, outraging rebels who see it as a way of the government to increase power.
- 10 May – Over 80 people are killed in an attack by insurgents on a cattle camp in southern Sudan. In the Abyei region, 4 UN peacekeepers are shot.
- 18 May – Sudanese jets bomb a village in Darfur according to the UN.
- 21 May – Southern Sudan claims that Sudan has begun invading the Abyei region. The government takes control of it with the UN confirming the events.
- 22 May – The United Nations Security Council demands that Sudan withdraw troops from Abyei.
- 24 May – The UN reveals that over 20,000 people have fled Abyei to southern Sudan after the takeover of the region 3 days ago. In response to this, a southern minister resigns.
- 26 May – Salva Kiir demands Sudan withdraw from Abyei and declares there will be no war.
- 31 May – Kiir and al-Bashir agree to demilitarise the border at Abyei.

=== June ===
- 2 June – Officials say nearly 100 people were killed in clashes between the north and south in Abyei.
- 3 June – Two rebels are killed in clashes with the government in Darfur.
- 4 June – Sudan dismisses UN calls to withdraw from Abyei.
- 5 June – Fighting breaks out in South Kordofan between the north and south governments.
- 6 June – Shooting is reported in the city of Kaduqli in South Kordofan.
- 7 June – Fighting in South Kordofan kills 6 people.
- 10 June – The south accuses the north of bombing a village in Unity State, killing 3.
- 19 June – Monitors say the north is massing in South Kordofan amid tensions with the south.
- 20 June – The north and south sign a ceasefire over Abyei with Ethiopian peacekeepers permitted in the region.
- 22 June – President al-Bashir threatens to cut off pipelines of South Sudanese petroleum if a deal for oil is not agreed upon by 1 July.
- 27 June – A train carrying a southern Sudanese returnee in South Kordofan is attacked by northern Arab groups killing said returnee.
- 28 June – President al-Bashir visits Beijing, China to discuss the south's independence that will soon be granted.

=== July ===
- 9 July – The Republic of South Sudan secedes from Sudan becoming a sovereign state.
- 19 July – A leaked UN report says there may have been war crimes committed in the conflict in South Kordofan.
