= 2017 in Sudan =

- Decades: 1990s; 2000s; 2010s; 2020s
- See also: Other events of 2017; History of Sudan

The following lists events that happened during 2017 in Sudan.

== Incumbents ==
- President: Omar al-Bashir
- Prime Minister: Bakri Hassan Saleh
- Vice President:
  - Bakri Hassan Saleh (Frst)
  - Hassabu Mohamed Abdalrahman (Second)

== Ongoing ==
- War in Darfur

== Events ==
- 30 July – establishment of the Province of the Episcopal Church of Sudan

== Sports ==
- 24 January – ? – 2017 Sudan Premier League season
- 4–13 August – Sudan at the 2017 World Championships in Athletics

== Deaths ==
- 16 February – Ali Osman, Sudanese expatriate composer and conductor in Egypt (b. 1958)
- 12 August – Fatima Ahmed Ibrahim, Sudanese Communist Party member (b. 1933)
