= 1998 in Sudan =

- Decades: 1970s; 1980s; 1990s; 2000s; 2010s
- See also: Other events of 1998; History of Sudan

The following lists events that happened during 1998 in Sudan.

== Incumbents ==
- President: Omar al-Bashir
- Vice President:
  - Ali Osman Taha (First)
  - George Kongor Arop (Second)

== Events ==
=== September ===
- September 18 – The United Nations condemns Libya, Sudan and the Democratic Republic of the Congo for breaches against the UN's air embargo against Libya.

=== October ===
- October 15 – Sudanese refugees flee DRC, bringing themselves to a famine in southern Sudan.
