= 1999 in Sudan =

- Decades: 1970s; 1980s; 1990s; 2000s; 2010s
- See also: Other events of 1999; History of Sudan

The following lists events that happened during 1999 in Sudan.

== Incumbents ==
- President: Omar al-Bashir
- Vice President:
  - Ali Osman Taha (First)
  - George Kongor Arop (Second)

== Events ==
=== March ===
- March 1 – Sudan enters the Second Congo War.
