= Bishara Juma Aror =

Former Minister of Information, Interior and Animal Resources

Bishara Juma Arour

Minister of Ministry of Information (Sudan)

Minister Ministry of Interior

Minister of Ministry of Animal Resources

Personal details
- Born: 1966 (age 59–60)
- Education: Sudan Open University; Silti Institute in Khartoum

Bushara Juma Aror (born 1966) is a Sudanese politician and the former Minister of Information, Minister of Animal Resources and Minister of Interior.

== Early life and education ==
Bushara Juma Aror was born in 1966 in the Kasha area, located within the Sunut locality of West Kordofan State. He completed his early education in his hometown. He later earned a bachelor's degree in education, specializing in English, from the Sudan Open University. Following this, he pursued further studies at the Silti Institute in Khartoum, where he obtained a diploma in English language instruction.

== Political career ==
Bushara began to gain political prominence when he took part in the national dialogue launched by President al-Bashir. He joined the process as a representative of the National Coalition for Change, an alliance that brought together several opposition parties, including his own. This move positioned him closer to the ruling National Congress Party, which later selected him to join the government delegation in direct talks with the SPLM–North. His inclusion was considered symbolic, highlighting both his affiliation with a different political group and his roots in the Nuba Mountains, a region where not all residents supported the SPLM. Bushara continued to serve actively in the negotiation delegation. Eventually, he was appointed as the Minister of Animal Resources Ministry.

In 2019, he was appointed as the Minister of Interior under the Sudanese president Omar al-Bashir. Also, in the previous government under the leadership of Mutaz Musa, he was appointed as the minister of information .
