= 2018 in Sudan =

- Decades: 1990s; 2000s; 2010s; 2020s
- See also: Other events of 2018; History of Sudan

The following lists events that happened during 2018 in Sudan.

== Incumbents ==
- President: Omar al-Bashir
- Prime Minister: Bakri Hassan Saleh
- Vice President:
  - Bakri Hassan Saleh (First)
  - Hassabu Mohamed Abdalrahman (Second)

== Ongoing ==
- War in Darfur

== Sports ==
- 3 February – Football: season start of the 2018 Sudan Premier League

== Deaths ==
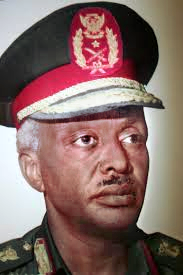
Abdel Rahman Swar al-Dahab

- 5 January – Vincent Mojwok Nyiker, Roman Catholic prelate, Bishop of Malakal (b. 1933).
- July – Fatima Abdel Mahmoud, politician (b. 1945).
- 18 October – Abdel Rahman Swar al-Dahab, military officer and politician, President 1985–1986 (born 1934).
