= 2003 in Sudan =

- Decades: 1980s; 1990s; 2000s; 2010s; 2020s
- See also: Other events of 2003; History of Sudan

The following lists events that happened during 2003 in Sudan.

== Incumbents ==
- President: Omar al-Bashir
- Vice President:
  - Ali Osman Taha (First)
  - Moses Kacoul Machar (Second)

== Events ==
=== February ===
- February 9 – The War in Darfur starts.

=== July ===
- July 8 – Sudan Airways Flight 139, with 117 people on board, crashes in Sudan.
