= 2015 in Sudan =

- Decades: 1990s; 2000s; 2010s; 2020s
- See also: Other events of 2015; History of Sudan

The following lists events that happened during 2015 in Sudan.

== Incumbents ==
- President: Omar al-Bashir
- Vice President:
  - Bakri Hassan Saleh (First)
  - Hassabu Mohamed Abdalrahman (Second)

== Events ==
=== April ===
- 2 April – The Sudanese general election, 2015 was won by Omar al-Bashir although the credibility of the election was marred by an opposition boycott.

=== May ===
- 25 May – Sudan denied allegations that it is supporting rebels in South Sudan threatening oil fields.
