= 2007 in Sudan =

- Decades: 1980s; 1990s; 2000s; 2010s; 2020s
- See also: Other events of 2007; History of Sudan

Danny Garcia walking and praying with Christians in Sudan (2007)

The following lists events that happened during 2007 in Sudan.

== Incumbents ==
- President: Omar al-Bashir
- Vice President:
  - Salva Kiir (First)
  - Ali Osman Taha (Second)

== Events ==
=== January ===
- 24 January – A Sudanese airliner, Air West Flight 612, carrying 103 people, is hijacked by a lone gunman and diverted to N'Djamena, Chad. The Air West flight lands at the airport in N'Djamena and the hijacker is arrested.

=== May ===
- 2 May – The International Criminal Court issues arrest warrants for Sudanese humanitarian affairs minister Ahmed Haroun and Janjaweed leader Ali Kushayb on charges of war crimes committed during the Darfur conflict.

=== June ===
- 15 June – Sudan and a breakaway faction of the Justice and Equality Movement of Darfur sign a peace treaty.

=== August ===
- 1 August – Sudan pledges support for UNAMID, a joint United Nations and African Union peacekeeping force in Darfur.
- 3 August – Rebel groups in Darfur hold meetings in Tanzania jointly mediated by the United Nations and the African Union to resolve disputes.
- 28 August – The Sudanese government and the United Nations launch a flood appeal to help victims of recent flooding which has killed 89 people and destroyed 73,000 homes.
- 29 August – John Holmes, the United Nations' emergency relief coordinator, warns that refugees of the Darfur conflict are arming themselves and may soon be able to defend themselves if the Sudanese government renews its attacks.

=== September ===
- 2 September – Sudan postpones a census that is a crucial for the success of two national elections.
- 3 September – The Secretary-General of the United Nations Ban Ki-Moon arrives in Sudan to press for an end to violence in Darfur.
