= 2014 in Sudan =

- Decades: 1990s; 2000s; 2010s; 2020s
- See also: Other events of 2014; History of Sudan

The following lists events that happened during 2014 in Sudan.

== Incumbents ==
- President: Omar al-Bashir
- Vice President:
  - Bakri Hassan Saleh (First)
  - Hassabu Mohamed Abdalrahman (Second)

== Events ==
=== February ===
- In February, an 18-year-old pregnant Ethiopian divorcee who said she had been gang-raped was charged with adultery and faced possible execution by stoning. Her attempt to file a rape complaint was rejected on the grounds that she was already under investigation and had not reported the assault at the time, although she said she had immediately informed a police officer. The woman was later sentenced to one month in prison, suspended, and fined 5,000 Sudanese pounds. The adultery charge, which carried a possible sentence of death by stoning, was dropped after the court accepted that she was divorced. Activists condemned the ruling, warning that it could discourage rape victims from reporting assaults and reinforce impunity for perpetrators. The court also warned that she could face further punishment for entering Sudan illegally.

=== May ===
- 15 May – An eight-month pregnant Christian woman, Mariam Yahia Ibrahim Ishag, was sentenced to death by hanging for apostasy in Sudan in a case that drew widespread international condemnation. The court declared her Christian marriage invalid and also sentenced her to 100 lashes for adultery. Later that month, she gave birth to a daughter in prison, where her 20-month-old son was also being held. The court said she could nurse the baby for two years before the death sentence was carried out. Her lawyers appealed the ruling on 22 May, arguing that it violated the constitutional right to freedom of religion. On 31 May, a foreign ministry official said that she would be released within days.

=== November ===
- 27 November – At least 133 people were killed and 100 wounded, in the aftermath of clashes between Awlad Omran and Al-Ziyoud groups of the Mesiria tribe. The clashes occurred in the Kwak area of the West Kurdufan state.
