= 2010 El Fasher protests =

The 2010 El Fasher protests or the Mawasir Market scam began in North Darfur, Sudan, in May 2010 due to a Ponzi scheme collapse. Protest were violently repressed by the Sudanese police which killed 9 protesters and injured 40.

== Protests ==
Protests started in El Fasher in May, 2010 after a large pyramid scheme collapsed which led to citizens losing significant amounts of money. The pyramid scheme had started in the central marketplace of El Fasher. An unnamed business had been promising returns up to 50 percent in a month. The business closed down a month before the Sudan 2010 general elections leading to investors losing all of their investments. Losses were reported to be around 240-350 million Sudanese pounds.

== Government response ==
Sudanese police repressed the protests heavily leading to the death of at least 9 civilians and arrests of 104 protesters. On 2 May police began firing at protestors as they were approaching the house of Osman Kebir the then governor of North Darfur. According to local residents, Kebir had promised compensation for the victims of the Ponzi scheme, but failed to do so. According to the secretary general of North Darfur's government, multiple men were arrested in connection to the Ponzi scheme.

Due to the government harsh repression of the protests, Justice and Equality Movement (JEM) suspended their negotiantions with the government momentarily. SLA/MM leader Minni Minnawi condemned the governments actions and called for actions to protect people's money.
