= Walking Man (disambiguation) =

Walking Man is a 1974 album by James Taylor.

Walking Man may also refer to:

- The Walking Man (French: L'homme qui marche), a famous sculpture by the world-renowned French sculptor Auguste Rodin ca. 1877
- L'Homme qui marche I (English: Walking Man I), a bronze sculpture created by Swiss sculptor Alberto Giacometti in 1961.
- Walking Man (Borofsky), a 17m-tall sculpture by Jonathan Borofsky in Munich's Leopoldstraße
- A planned five-book cycle of novels by Mo Hayder, started in 2008.
- The Walking Man (manga), a manga by Jiro Taniguchi.
- Eddie Yost, a professional baseball player nicknamed the "Walking Man" for the numerous bases on balls he drew.
- The Walking Man (Adrian Saint), a character in Simon R. Green's Nightside (book series)
- Joseph Kromelis, a Chicago street vendor.
- Danny Garcia (activist), an activist that is notable for his walking.

== See also ==
- Dead Man Walking (disambiguation)
- Randall Flagg, nicknamed "The Walkin' Dude", a character in several of Stephen King's works
