= Mudawi Ibrahim Adam =

Sudanese human rights activist (born 1956)

- مضاوي إبراهيم آدم
- Born: 1956 (age 69–70); Sudan
- Occupations: Mechanical Engineer, Assistant Professor at the University of Khartoum, Faculty of Engineering, Department of Mechanical Engineering
- Known for: Human rights activist
- Awards: Front Line Award for Human Rights Defenders at Risk (2005); Human Rights First Award (2005)

Mudawi Ibrahim Adam (born 1956) is a Sudanese human rights activist and engineer known for his role in exposing human rights violations in Darfur. He is the founder and former director of the Sudan Social Development Organization (SUDO) and has been repeatedly jailed for charges related to his human rights work.

== Work with SUDO and early arrests ==
Under Mudawi's leadership, SUDO began work in bringing the War in Darfur to the world's attention in 2003. Along with their human rights reporting, SUDO also initiated water, sanitation and health projects in the area, along with local workshops on human rights and assistance for internally displaced persons. For this work, Mudawi was awarded the 2005 Human Rights First Award and the 2005 Front Line Award for Human Rights Defenders at Risk.

Mudawi Ibrahim Adam was arrested at his home in December 2003 after a visit to Darfur. He was charged with "crimes against the state", with the evidence against him including possession of documents from Amnesty International. This charge carried the possibility of being sentenced to death, but the government dropped its case in August 2004.

At 2 a.m. on 24 January 2005, Mudawi was re-arrested at his home in Kondua, North Kurdufan, along with a friend, Salah Mohamed Abdelrahman. Mudawi was then held for two months without a formal charge, during which time he began a hunger strike in protest. His arrests were widely protested by groups including Human Rights Watch, Front Line Defenders, Amnesty International, and the Irish government. He was eventually released without being brought to trial. By 2006, Mudawi's role had become prominent enough that New York Times reporter Nicholas Kristof described him as "one of the leading human rights advocates in Sudan". In 2007, he attended a conference in Prague organized by Natan Sharansky, Václav Havel, and José María Aznar, where he met with dissident figures from around the world as well as US President George W. Bush.

== Closing of SUDO and 2010 arrests ==
On 5 March 2009, the same day that President Omar al-Bashir was indicted by the ICC for crimes against humanity, the Sudanese government ordered the closure of SUDO, and its offices were taken over by state security forces. The New York Times reported that the letter closing the offices "came from the Humanitarian Affairs Commission, which is run by Ahmed Haroun, one of the people facing an arrest warrant from the International Criminal Court for mass slaughter in Darfur." Mudawi and the organization appealed their closure in court, winning the appeal in April 2010. However, according to a 2011 SUDO press release, the organization remained effectively closed: "in Sudan you can win a case but nothing changes. SUDO’s offices remained locked, its assets remained frozen, and the organization in Sudan was not allowed to resume operations."

At the same time, Mudawi faced repeated trials for "financial mismanagement" of SUDO's resources. He was initially acquitted of these charges on 5 March 2010, but the case's judge, Abdel Monim Mohammed Saleim, reversed the acquittal on 22 December, re-imprisoning Mudawi. He was sentenced to "one year imprisonment and a fine of £S.3,000 (USD 1,250) for financial mismanagement." Mudawi was released on 25 January with notice that the time he had served had been sufficient; however, as of January 2011, the charges against him remained, and Amnesty International continued to consider him a prisoner of conscience. He was detained for over two months at Kobar Prison. Mudawi was released on 29 August 2017.
