= Osman Kebir =

Sudanese politician

Osman Mohamed Yousif Kibir

Second Vice President of Sudan
- In office 10 September 2018 – 11 April 2019
- President: Omar al-Bashir
- Preceded by: Hassabu Mohamed Abdalrahman

Governor of North Darfur
- In office May 2003 – June 2015
- Succeeded by: Abdel-Wahid Youssef

Personal details
- Party: National Congress Party (Sudan)

Osman Kebir, also known as Osman Mohamed Yousif Kibir, is a Sudanese politician. He served as the governor of the state of North Darfur in Sudan between May 2003 and June 2015. In September 2018, Kebir was appointed as the Second Vice President of Sudan.

== Governor of North Darfur ==
In May 2003 Kebir was appointed governor of North Darfur. He is member of the National Congress Party. He has publicly denied that the Janjaweed had any link to the government. In October 2004, he accused numerous international organizations and observers of the Darfur conflict of bias against the Sudanese government. Kofi Annan met him in provincial capital El Fasher in 2004, to call on protection of Darfur villagers.

During at least part the Darfur genocide (2003–2005) Kebir was governor of North Darfur and lifted some restrictions on aid organisations in October 2004. In October 2005 the head of the Islamic Bank of Faisal in El Fasher was shot and killed, Kebir blamed the Justice and Equality Movement and Sudan Liberation Army. In October 2008, while still in this position, he met Alain Le Roy, the United Nations undersecretary for peacekeeping.

In April 2010 Kebir expelled several National Congress Party members of the North Darfur state legislature after they had sided with the independent candidate for the position of North Darfur, Ibrahim Mohamed Suleiman. During the May 2010 El Fasher protests, Kebir at first promised the affected individuals compensation, but later backtracked on his decision. There were subsequently protests at his governor's house and police fired on the crowd, killing several individuals.

At the beginning of December 2010, Kebir began an offensive against the towns in which the SLA-MM had a presence. The initial goal of crushing the rebels became an excuse to brutalize the Zaghawa population. Kebir armed and encouraged non-Zaghawa populations to fight and expel Zaghawas. Between March–June 2011, a large number of Zaghawas were displaced as a result of their indiscriminate aerial bombardments on Jabal Marra. During these events, tribal militiamen, mainly Tunjur and some Birgid, organized a massacre against the Zaghawas in Abu Zerega with the approval of the authorities.

In 2012 Kebir denied having a private militia, while a militia called Kebir's Militia consisting mainly of Berti people emerged, which Kebir also is.

On 15 March 2014, while in his position as governor, Kebir survived an assassination attempt near Kuma. His driver and a police officer were killed. In August of the same year Kebir reshuffled his government.

In June 2015 Kebir was succeeded as governor by Abdel-Wahid Youssef.

== Vice President ==
On 10 September 2018 Kebir was named vice president of Sudan, succeeding Hassabu Mohamed Abdalrahman. While in this position, in December 2018, he ordered the governors of the states of Darfur to return land to people who had been displaced, if necessary by force. In the wake of the Sudanese revolution in 2019 Kebir lost his position and was imprisoned.
