= Alzaiem Alazhari University =

University in Khartoum North, Sudan

Coordinates: 15.6378°N 32.5267°E

- جامعة الزعيم الأزهري
- Type: Public
- Established: 1993; 33 years ago
- Rector: Professor Mohamed Saeed AlKhalifa
- Location: Bahri, Khartoum, Sudan
- Website: www.aau.edu.sd/index.php
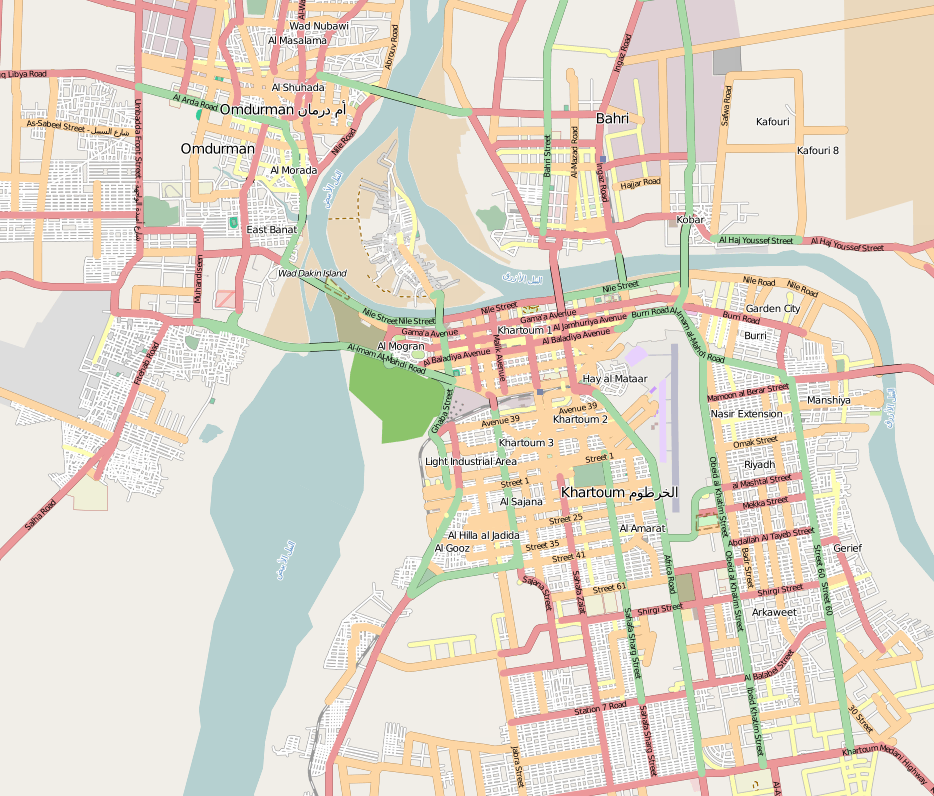
- Location in Khartoum Alzaiem Alazhari University (Sudan)

The Alzaiem Alazhari University (Arabic: جامعة الزعيم الأزهري) located in Khartoum North, Sudan. It was established in 1993 in memory of Ismail al-Azhari.

== Faculties ==
- Engineering
- Medicine
- Agriculture
- Medical Laboratory Sciences
- Medical Sciences
- Medical Radiologic Sciences
- Computer Science and Information Technology
- Economics and Administrative Sciences
- Education
- Political Sciences
- Urban sciences
- Law
- Technical Studies

== Faculty of Medical Sciences and Technology ==
The faculty, established by decree of the university council on 28 February 2001, has five departments: Nursing, Anesthesia, Physiotherapy, Midwifery (female students only), and the Department of Nutrition and Therapeutic Nutrition.

== Campuses ==
There are four campuses:

- Central campus in Khartoum Bahri
- Al-Abasia campus
- Wd-Nubawi campus
- Al-Tijani Hilal campus
- Kafori campus

== Affiliations ==
Alzaiem Alazhari University is one of 22 universities in Sudan with membership of the Federation of the Universities of the Islamic World.

== See also ==
- List of Islamic educational institutions
