= Law enforcement in Sudan =

Sudanese Police Force Emblem.

Law enforcement in Sudan is the law enforcement of the country of Sudan.

== History ==
The British army assigned a captain to the central administration for police duties in 1898. He commanded 30 British army officers and helped to organize provincial police forces. In 1901 the authorities decentralized the police to improve efficiency. The government assumed responsibility for administrative control of the police in 1908, but provincial governors retained operational control of the forces. In 1928 the British established the Sudan Police Force (SPF) under the Ministry of Interior. Throughout the colonial period, the police lacked the resources and manpower to deploy officers throughout Sudan. Instead, the government gave tribal leaders authority to maintain order among their people and to enlist a limited number of “retainers” to help them in law-enforcement duties. This communal security system remained in effect until the early 1970s.

The Sudan Police College opened in Khartoum in 1937 to train all policemen and administrators in a one- or two-year course. Graduates could transfer between the two services initially, but by 1948 training had become too specialized to allow this practice. In 1969 the authorities built a police laboratory to enhance criminal-investigation capabilities.

The SPF faced several challenges during the colonial and early postcolonial periods. On June 4, 1951, a group of police officers met to discuss recent labor unrest in Khartoum, North Khartoum, and Omdurman. The British commandant broke up the meeting. The police officers then staged a demonstration that resulted in the dismissal of the ringleaders, who refused an order to return to barracks. On June 8–9, companies from the Camel Corps and the Eastern Arab Corps arrived in Khartoum from Al-Obeid and Kassala to prevent further unrest while the SDF disarmed the police. A few days later, the authorities allowed 670 police officers to return to duty but sacked 222 others. The British released a report in July that blamed the unrest on incompetent British officers who commanded the police and on wretched housing conditions. In the aftermath of this report, workmen built new housing and renovated old barracks.

The SPF and army worked together from 1965 to 1969 to quell the unrest caused by the rebellion in the Southern provinces. By 1970, SPF headquarters included administration, immigration, nationality, public affairs, training, and security administration. These divisions also existed at provincial levels. Each provincial police force had about 2,000 officers. Khartoum frequently modified the command and administration of the SPF.

Prior to 1977, women served in the police after learning basic administrative duties and working on criminal cases involving women as witnesses or defendants. In 1977 four women completed the two year course at the Sudan Police College and became the first females to join the ranks. A limited number of women served in the SPF and generally worked in administrative sections, on juvenile delinquency matters, or criminal cases that involved female Sudanese witnesses or defendants.

The police reported to the minister of interior until 1979, when that post was abolished, and various ministers became responsible for different areas of police work. This arrangement proved unwieldy, however, and the Police Act of 1979 instituted a unified command in which the head of the force reported to the president. After the overthrow of President Jaafar Nimeiry in 1985, the cabinet position of minister of interior was restored, and the director general of police was made responsible to the minister.

Central police headquarters in Khartoum was organized into several divisions—such as administration, training, and security affairs—each commanded by a police major general. The main operational elements included the traffic police and the riot police. The 1979 legislation brought specialized police units, such as one for the Sudan Railways, under the SPF's authority. Khartoum headquarters maintained liaison and cooperated with the International Criminal Police Organization (Interpol) and agencies involved in combating international drug trafficking.

The government's new administrative system delegated many powers to the regional level, but law enforcement outside major urban areas was organized at the state level. Thus, the SPF was subdivided into state commands, which were organized according to the same divisions found in the national headquarters. Local police directors reported to state police commissioners, who in turn were responsible to the SPF director general in Khartoum. Each provincial command had its own budget.

The SPF expanded from roughly 7,500 officers and men in 1956 to about 18,000 in 1970 and 30,000 by 2005.

== Police organizations ==
As of 2010, internal security was divided up among an array of organizations, including the United Police Forces (UPF), Popular Police Forces (PPF), Popular Defense Forces, and Border Intelligence Guard.

=== United Police Forces ===
The United Police Forces had an estimated 30,000 personnel who were responsible for civil defense, criminal investigations, immigration and customs, passport control, traffic control, and wildlife protection. Police divisions normally operated within state commands. State police commissioners reported to the director general of police in Khartoum, who answered to the minister of interior. The UPF inventory included 40 Fahd armored fighting vehicles, 20 Panhard M3 armored fighting vehicles, and 30 armored personnel carriers. The serviceability of these vehicles was unknown. Generally, the UPF had not deployed significant numbers of officers to South Sudan. After 2004, an unknown number of UPF personnel deployed to Darfur. Human-rights advocates accused the UPF of committing an array of human-rights atrocities.

=== Popular Police Forces ===
The Popular Police Forces, created in 1989, were estimated to have at least 35,000 members who technically were under the supervision of the director general of police, but it operated as a politicized militia that sought to enforce “moral standards” among the country's Islamic population. The PPF had a poor human-rights record. It was dissolved by the transitional government after the Sudanese Revolution.

== Border control ==
Sudan lacked a true border guard. The UPF was responsible for passport control, immigration, and customs at border-crossing points, although the SAF and the PDF might also undertake border-control duties. However, there was a Border Intelligence Guard that operated outside the SAF chain of command; it reported directly to SAF military intelligence officers in the area of operations. The Border Intelligence Guard was active during the Southern civil war. In 2002–3, the guard recruited sources in Darfur to gather information about political and military conditions. Some observers accused the guard of recruiting for the janjaweed.

== Training ==
One researcher found no available information about training in the al-Bashir era, but formerly police officer cadets usually received two years of training at the Sudan Police College near Khartoum. The institution provided theoretical and practical instruction and served as a training school for military personnel who required police skills in their assignments. In addition to recruit training, the college offered courses in criminal law, general police duties, fingerprinting, clerical work, photography, and the use of small arms. Enlisted recruits usually underwent four months of training at state headquarters.

== Community relations and human rights ==
State police traditionally enjoyed good relations with the local communities, but in Khartoum if not elsewhere, police treatment of arrested persons could be harsh. During the 1990s and early 2000s, public-order campaigns in Khartoum often resulted in roundups of thousands of people, who were then charged with illegal street vending or loitering. In urban areas, police abused refugees, particularly Southerners, by stealing from them or beating them for minor infractions. The police also administered floggings for drinking alcohol or for curfew violations. Refugees seldom had recourse to the legal system when attacked by the police. Partly as a result of such actions, the al-Bashir government earned a reputation for poor treatment of prisoners.

== See also ==
- Prisons in Sudan
