= Mohamed Tahir Ayala =

Prime Minister of Sudan in 2019 (1951–2025)

- محمد طاهر أيلا
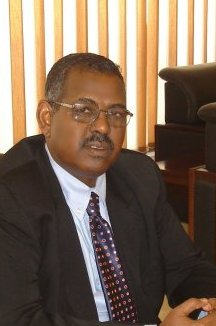
- Ayala in 2011

14th Prime Minister of Sudan
- In office 24 February 2019 – 11 April 2019; Caretaker: 24 February 2019 – 14 March 2019
- President: Omar al-Bashir
- Preceded by: Motazz Moussa
- Succeeded by: Abdalla Hamdok

Governor of Gezira State
- In office 2015 – 23 February 2019

Governor of Red Sea State
- In office 2005–2015

Personal details
- Born: 1951 Jubayt, Anglo-Egyptian Sudan (modern-day Sudan)
- Died: 6 October 2025 (aged 73–74) Cairo, Egypt
- Education: University of Khartoum; Cardiff University

Mohamed Tahir Ayala (Arabic: محمد طاهر أيلا, romanized: Muḥammad Ṭāhir Aylā; 1951 – 6 October 2025) was a Sudanese politician who served as Prime Minister of Sudan from February to April 2019, making him the final Prime Minister to serve under President Omar al-Bashir. On 11 April 2019, he was deposed along with the other members of the government in the 2019 Sudanese coup d'état. He had previously served as Minister of Roads and Bridges and later as the governor of Red Sea State (2005–2015) and Gezira State (2015–2019).

== Life and career ==
Ayala was born in 1951 in Jubayt, and graduated in economics from the University of Khartoum and Cardiff University, with a Bachelor and master's degree respectively.

Soon after the 1989 Sudanese coup d'état he was appointed director of the Sudan Seaports Corporation and later became federal minister for roads and bridges. In 2005 he was appointed governor of Red Sea state. He served in this position until 2015 and then became governor of Gezira State. In November 2017, while still governor of Gezira, Sudanese President Omar al-Bashir offered Ayala his support for the 2020 presidential election if he were to stand. In response, Ayala said, "The demand of the Gezira people and my demand is for 2020 to be the year where al-Bashir is elected for a third term in office. That’s the demand of all of the Sudanese people."

On 24 February 2019, he was sworn in as Prime Minister of Sudan by Omar al-Bashir. During his short time as prime minister, Ayala dissolved the Sudanese Petroleum Corporation and accused the Sudanese Professionals Association of harassing security personnel during protests. On 11 April 2019 he was deposed and arrested in the 2019 Sudanese coup d'état.

Ayala died in Cairo after a long illness on 6 October 2025 at the age of 74.

Political offices
Preceded by Motazz Moussa	Prime Minister of Sudan; 2019	Succeeded by Abdalla Hamdok
