= 2006 in Sudan =

- Decades: 1980s; 1990s; 2000s; 2010s; 2020s
- See also: Other events of 2006; History of Sudan

The following lists events that happened during 2006 in Sudan.

== Incumbents ==
- President: Omar al-Bashir
- Vice President:
  - Salva Kiir (First)
  - Ali Osman Taha (Second)

== Events ==
=== March ===
- 3 March – Kenya and Sudan, completing trade talks that have gone on since 2001, announce plans to sign a landmark trade agreement.

=== April ===
- 9 April – Nigerian President Olusegun Obasanjo and the Republic of the Congo president Denis Sassou-Nguesso host talks in Abuja between the rival groups in Darfur hoping to accelerate the peace process. Sudanese attendees include Vice President Ali Osman Mohamed Taha, Minni Arcua Minnawi head of the most powerful faction of the divided Sudan Liberation Army, and Khalil Ibrahim, leader of the smaller Justice and Equality Movement.

=== May ===
- 16 May – The United Nations Security Council votes unanimously to initiate the process which would lead to a UN peacekeeping force relieving the beleaguered African Union peacekeepers in the war-torn Darfur region. The government of Sudan opposes the move.

=== June ===
- 3 June – Human Rights Watch releases a video showing South Sudanese Vice President Dr. Riek Machar Teny Dhurgon bribing cult and rebel leader Joseph Kony and his second-in-command Vincent Otti of the Lord's Resistance Army to not attack southern Sudanese citizens.
- 8 June – A delegation from the rebel Lord's Resistance Army arrives in Juba for peace talks with the Ugandan government to be mediated by Riek Machar, Vice President of Southern Sudan.
- 25 June – The Sudanese government announces the lifting of a partial ban on United Nations operations in the conflict-hit Darfur region. The ban was made after the government accused the UN of transporting a rebel leader who opposes a recent peace deal.

=== July ===
- 14 July – Talks begin in Juba between delegations from the Lord's Resistance Army and the Ugandan Government with a view to ending the conflict centred in Acholiland. The leader of the Ugandan delegation, Internal Affairs Minister Dr Ruhakana Rugunda had stated that obtaining a quick ceasefire is his priority.

=== August ===
- 8 August – As Chadian President Idriss Déby is sworn into his third term in office; he hugs Sudanese President Omar al-Bashir, who only a few days ago was overseeing a campaign to overthrow the second Déby administration.
