= Julie van der Veen =

Dutch painter

Julie Henriëtte Eugénie van der Veen (Kudus, Dutch East Indies, 8 February 1903 – The Hague, 10 January 1997) was a Dutch visual artist.

== Life ==
Julie van der Veen was born in Java as daughter of Peter Jan van der Veen (1864-1923), director of the sugar refinery Sukowidi in Java and of Julie Frédérique Louise von Boddien (1863-1961), descendant of a German noble family.

Julie van der Veen was educated at the Royal Academy of Visual Arts in The Hague and took lessons at Sierk Schröder. She later stayed in France regularly. In Paris she took lessons with André Lhote and had contacts with Russian exiles. In addition, she took lessons in Paris with Marcel Gromaire and with Fernand Léger and visited the Académie de la Grande Chaumière. At André Lhote she met the Argentine Nina Negri who suggested to follow lessons with Bill Hayter in his Atelier 17 in Paris. In 1937 she traveled at the invitation of her then Turkish friend Cemal Tollu, who later became a well-known painter in Turkey, via Italy to Istanbul. On the Côte d'Azur she met the Iraqi Younis Bahri with whom she became fiancé in 1930 and married in Berlin in 1939. This marriage lasted less than four months. On 9 May 1940, one day before the German invasion, she returned to the Netherlands. After the Second World War she regularly stayed in Paris for a longer period of time and resumed painting at André Lhote. Later she lived in The Hague and was friends with the painter Hannie Bal from Voorschoten and the photographer Hester Carsten. Both women have been the wife of the artist Willem Schrofer. Later in her life, Julie van der Veen lived under harsh circumstances in the Moerwijk district of The Hague and died in a nursing home in Scheveningen. She was a member of both the Haagse Kunstkring and the Voorschotense Kunstkring.

== Work ==
Her work consists mainly of oil paintings, watercolors, engravings and drawings. She mainly painted objects from her immediate surroundings. In France she came into contact with Fauvism through contact with André Lhote. Because of her stay in Paris between the two world wars, she can be counted as part of the School of Paris. Her work is also counted among the New Hague School. She regularly exhibited in France (Salon des Indépendants 1936 and 1937) and in the Netherlands. Her work is included in the collection of Museum Arnhem.

== Works of art ==
- La Vie (abt. 1930), oil paint, 38 x 46 cm
- Lonely boats in the port of Brindisi, oil paint, 37 x 45 cm
- Composition (1939), oil paint, 72 x 99 cm
- Eva (nude in classical landscape with columns), oil paint, 58 x 71 cm
- Solitude (mannequin in green and blue with fantastic shells, ca. 1939), oil paint
- Colorful abstract, oil paint, 45 x 55 cm, Museum Arnhem
- The wooden bridge (1956), oil paint, 73 x 92 cm
- Three bathers (1958), oil paint, 60 x 72 cm
- The Neher laboratory in Leidschendam – Voorburg (1968), oil paint, 72 x 89 cm.
