= 2009 in Sudan =

- Decades: 1980s; 1990s; 2000s; 2010s; 2020s
- See also: Other events of 2009; History of Sudan

Events from the year 2009 in Sudan.

== Incumbents ==
- President: Omar al-Bashir
- Vice President:
  - Salva Kiir (First)
  - Ali Osman Taha (Second)

== Events ==
- May 15 – Sudan accused Chad of two air bombardments in its territory done by the Chadian government to attack Chadian rebel groups' bases in Sudan.
