= Motazz Moussa =

Prime Minister of Sudan (2018–2019)

- معتز موسى
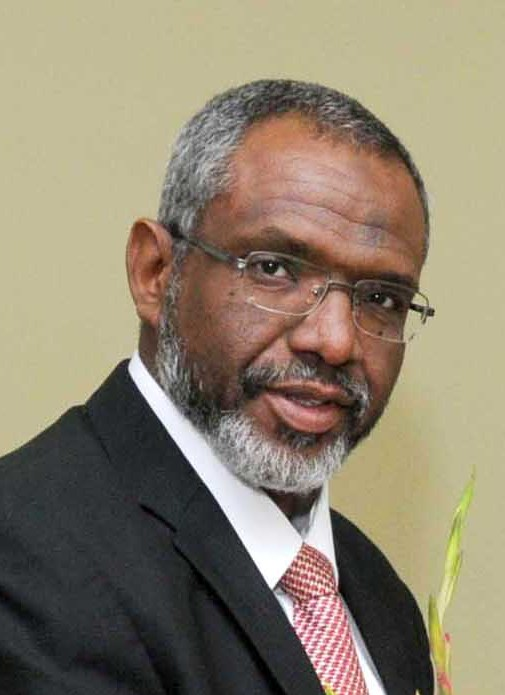
- Moussa in 2015

12th Prime Minister of Sudan
- In office 9 September 2018 – 22 February 2019
- President: Omar al-Bashir
- Preceded by: Bakri Hassan Saleh
- Succeeded by: Mohamed Tahir Ayala

Personal details
- Born: 1967 (age 57–58)
- Education: University of Khartoum; Alzaiem Alazhari University

Motazz Moussa Abdullah Salim (Arabic: معتز موسى; born 1967) is a Sudanese politician who served as Prime Minister of Sudan from 2018 to 2019. Prior to his tenure as prime minister he was Minister of Electricity and Water Resources from 2013 to 2018. Appointed by President Omar al-Bashir, the Sudanese Revolution broke out during his tenure and a state of emergency was declared one day before his dismissal.

== Early life and education ==
Motazz Moussa Abdullah Salim was born in 1967. He graduated with master's degrees from the University of Khartoum and Alzaiem Alazhari University. He was a cousin of President Omar al-Bashir.

== Career ==
In the 1990s Moussa worked in Sudan's embassy in Germany and later became an ambassador. He worked on dam construction projects in Sudan, Saudi Arabia, and Kuwait. In 2013, Moussa was appointed Minister of Electricity and Water Resources and held the position until he was appointed as prime minister.

al-Bashir dismissed Prime Minister Bakri Hassan Saleh and replaced him with Moussa on 9 September 2018. The number of ministerial appointments was reduced from 31 to 21 as a way to reduce government spending. He floated the Sudanese pound, which saw its value cut in half by October 2018. He announced a 15-month emergency economic reform plan in October 2018, which featured austerity On 23 February 2019, al-Bashir dismissed Moussa and replaced him with Mohamed Tahir Ayala. Moussa's dismissal came in the midst of the Sudanese revolution and one day after a state of emergency was declared by al-Bashir.

== Works cited ==
=== News ===
- "Sudan's prime minister announces 15-month emergency economic reform plan". Reuters. 24 October 2018. Archived from the original on 24 October 2018.
- Abdelaziz, Khalid; Knecht, Eric (9 September 2018). "Sudanese President Bashir dissolves government, appoints new PM". Reuters. Archived from the original on 10 September 2018.
- Adam, Ahmed (20 September 2018). "What is behind Sudan's cabinet reshuffle?". Al Jazeera English. Archived from the original on 25 June 2025.
- Amin, Mohammed (23 February 2019). "Major shake up in Sudan's government on first day of emergency rule". Middle East Eye. Archived from the original on 24 February 2019.
- Yeranian, Edward (10 October 2018). "Sudan Economy Facing Crisis After Sharp Currency Dip". Voice of America. Archived from the original on 25 June 2025.

=== Web ===
- "Mutaz Musa ABDULLAH SALIM". International Hydropower Association. Archived from the original on 10 September 2018.

Political offices
Preceded by Bakri Hassan Saleh	Prime Minister of Sudan; 2018–2019	Succeeded by Mohamed Tahir Ayala
