= Usamah Mohamad =

Usamah Mohamad (Arabic: أسامة محمد; born c. 1980) is a Sudanese web developer, blogger, and citizen journalist from Omdurman arrested during the protests of June 2012. A graduate of the University of Khartoum, he writes on Twitter under the name "simsimt".

On 22 June 2012, he and a friend used smartphones to document the heavy police presence in the neighborhood of Burri in Khartoum before a planned protest. They were then arrested by plainclothes officers. Though the friend was released seven hours later, Mohamad continued to be detained, and his relatives were informed that he was being held at Kober Prison. Before his arrest, Mohamad made a video for Al Jazeera explaining why he participated in the protests. In it, he stated his belief that "after twenty-three years of oppression and injustice, poverty, crimes that are all committed in the current regime, change now is inevitable."

Amnesty International designated Mohamad a prisoner of conscience, "held solely for exercising his right to freedom of expression". The organization also stated its concern that Mohamad was at risk of torture. Al Jazeera reported that Sudanese Twitter users were calling for his release under the hashtag #FreeUsamah.

Mohamed was released from incarceration in August 2012.
