= Kobar Prison =

Prison in Sudan

Coordinates: 15.623°N 32.553°E

Kobar Prison سجن كوبر
- Interactive map of Kobar Prison سجن كوبر
- Location: Khartoum North, Sudan
- Status: Operational
- Security class: Supermax, maximum security, general
- Opened: 1903
- Managed by: Ministry of Interior

Kobar Prison (Arabic: سجن كوبر), formerly known as Cooper prison, is one of the oldest prisons in Sudan, dating back to 1903. It was built by the administration of the former Anglo-Egyptian Sudan (1899–1956) and was named 'Kobar' in Arabic after the British official Cooper, who was in charge of the prison’s early administration.

Since its establishment, it has been Sudan's most notorious prison. It consists of six sections, and it was infamous for being the detention center for thousands of prisoners of conscience and politicians. In 2019, former President Omar al-Bashir was taken to this prison after having been overthrown in a coup d'etat. In April 2023, at the beginning stages of the civil war, a series of mass escapes occurred at many Sudanese prisons, including Kobar prison.

== Description ==
The prison was built with bricks and is guarded by high concrete walls and can hold hundreds of prisoners in its small and overcrowded cells. Its surface area is about five thousand square meters and was designed like prisons in the United Kingdom of the early 20th century. There is a special wing for political prisoners that has been used for the imprisonment or execution of former politicians or other well-known Sudanese personalities. During the government of Omar al-Bashir, the National Intelligence and Security Service (NISS) was in charge of the prison's administration.

It is located in the city of Khartoum North in the Kobar neighborhood, near the Blue Nile and next to the Signal Corps.

== 2023 prison break ==
In April 2023, several prominent Islamists escaped from Kobar Prison, including Ahmed Haroun, a senior official in the Omar al-Bashir regime who held multiple ministerial and gubernatorial positions. The International Criminal Court wants Haroun for crimes against humanity. Following his escape, Haroun sided with the Sudanese Armed Forces (SAF) in the Sudanese Civil War.

Other figures freed at the same time included Ali Osman Taha, a senior Islamist in the Bashir administration, and Osama Abdallah, who played a role in coordinating the Al-Bara' ibn Malik Battalion, an Islamist umbrella organization sanctioned by the U.S. for terrorism. Following their release, these former operatives exerted significant influence over General Abdel Fattah al-Burhan and the SAF. The escape fueled fears that the SAF facilitated their release in order to strengthen a de facto alliance between army chief General Abdel Fattah Burhan and Islamists from the ousted al-Bashir regime.

== Notable inmates ==
- Omar al-Bashir (2019–2023), deposed President of Sudan
- Amin Mekki Medani, politician and human rights activist (2014–2015)
- Farouk Abu Issa, former chairman of the National Consensus Forces (2014)
- Usamah Mohamad, blogger, and citizen journalist (2012)
- Hassan al-Turabi, former religious and political leader (2004–2005, 2009)
- Ibrahim el-Salahi, painter and former government official (1976)
- Abdel Khaliq Mahjub, former Secretary General of the Sudanese Communist Party, executed by hanging (1971)
- Sadiq al-Mahdi, former prime minister and politician (1970)
- Mahmoud Mohammed Taha, religious thinker, leader, and trained engineer (1985)
- Mudawi Ibrahim Adam, human rights activist and engineer (2016–2017)
