= 2016 Sudanese protests =

Anti austerity protests in Sudan

2016 Sudanese protests (2016 احتجاجات السودان)
- Date: April 22, 2016 – December 20, 2016
- Location: Sudan
- Caused by: Economic hardships and fresh round of austerity measures; Killing of Abubakr Hassan
- Goals: End to chaos and justice over killings; Resignation of President Omar al-Bashir; New general elections
- Methods: Demonstrations, Riots
- Result: Protests suppressed by force

The 2016 Sudanese protests (Arabic: 2016 احتجاجات السودان) was a widespread protest movement and violent demonstrations between April–December in Sudan in 2016 against new austerity measures and the killing of a student, Abubakr Hassan, that was met with violent police repression. After the killing of the student participating in a demonstration, a wave of popular student-led anti-government demonstrations against the government of longtime ruler Omar al-Bashir, who took power in 1989 and has faced the third biggest political challenge yet. The prices of diesel and the non-affordability of basic goods has also provoked widespread protests. Violent clashes erupted after police charged on demonstrators with batons demanding justice, end to Police brutality and centred on other demands and the response by protesters was pelting stones.

Student protests continued in other towns and cities in May. After new austerity measures were announced, protesters rallied in the streets of Khartoum on 30 November and 1 December and were met with tear gas. Public anger over the government and conditions in the country led to further demonstrations in several cities. On 19 December, a nationwide civil disobedience campaign and strikes marked the final day of the protest movement. Lawyers, activists and others took part.

== See also ==
- 2011-2013 protests in Sudan
