= Zeinab Elobeid Yousif =

Sudanese aircraft engineer (1952–2016)

- زينب العبيد يوسف
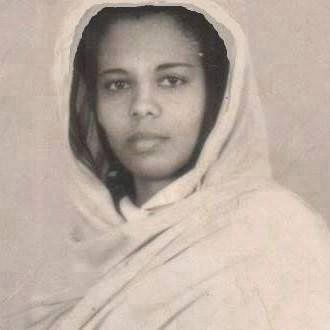
- 1st Arab, African and Sudanese Female Aircraft Engineer
- Born: Zeinab Elobeid Yousif; 1952; Khartoum, Sudan
- Died: 19 March 2016, 63; London UK
- Occupation: Aircraft Engineer
- Years active: 1978 to 2002
- Known for: 1st Arab, African and Sudanese female Aircraft Engineer
- Notable work: Avionic communication / navigation / & radar

Zeinab Elobeid Yousif (1952 – 19 March 2016) (Arabic: زينب العبيد يوسف), was a Sudanese aircraft engineer. She was the first Sudanese woman to be licensed by the Civil Aviation Authority in the United Kingdom. From July 1973 until May 1992, she worked with Sudan Airways, after which she relocated to the United Kingdom.

Yousif studied and worked in the fields of electronics, avionic communication, navigation and radar. She worked as ground engineer on diverse aircraft such as the Boeing 707 / Boeing 737 / 347 / Fokker 50 and Fokker F27 at Sudan Airways and later also on Cessna 402 / 404 / 208 & Beach craft 1900 at London Southend Airport.

== Early life ==
Yousif was born in Khartoum on 13 June 1952. She was the oldest daughter of Elobeid Yousif Ahmed Shidwan, a well-known and respected businessman and Asma Elobeid Ahmed Shidwan. Both her parents came from religious backgrounds.

Yousif grew up in the village of Oum Dawwaban (Arabic: أم ضوّاً بان) known for its religious school for boys where people from across Sudan and sub-Saharan Africa send their children to learn classical Arabic and study the Quran.

During her youth in the 1960s, Sudanese culture was considered patriarchal and hostile towards women wanting to study and work in technical fields such as engineering. Yousif graduated from highschool thanks to her father's encouragement. Yousif studied electronic engineering at Khartoum Polytechnic, now the University of Science and Technology, from 1970 to 1973.

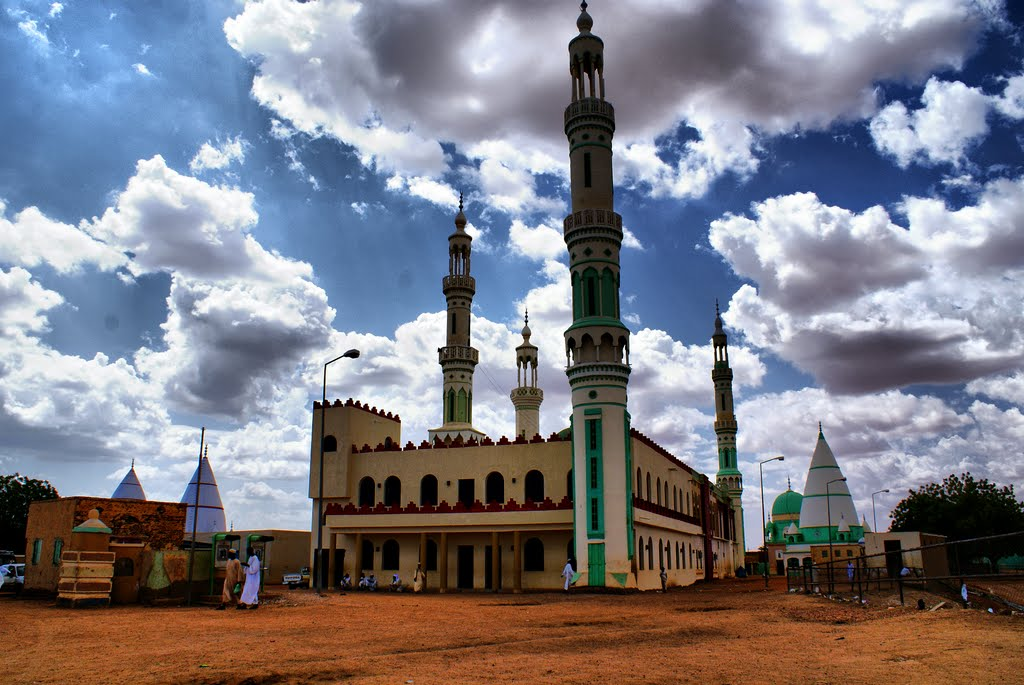

== Career ==
She first worked as an aircraft engineer in the radio workshop in maintenance and repair for Sudan Airways. From 1983 to 1986, she studied Avionics and Aerospace Engineering at Brunel Technical College in Bristol, UK, where she received her license from the Civil Aviation Authority. In the 1990s, she earned a Master of Science degree in Advanced Manufacturing Systems from Kingston University, London.
