= Moses Kacoul Machar =

Sudanese politician (born 1945)

Second Vice President of Sudan
- In office February 2001 – January 2005
- President: Omar al-Bashir
- Preceded by: George Kongor Arop
- Succeeded by: Ali Osman Taha

Personal details
- Born: 1945 (age 80–81) Pan Apaak of Yirol West, Bahr el Ghazal, Sudan (now South Sudan)

Moses Kacoul Machar (born 1945) was the Second Vice President of Sudan from February 2001 to January 2005. In 2004, he was sent abroad for medical treatment for an unspecified illness. Machar was also involved with talks with the Foreign Minister of Yemen, Abu Bakr al-Qerbi to forge a stronger relationship between the two countries.

Before appointment as Vice President of Sudan, he was a professor in Juba University.

In 2017 he was appointed to the South Sudanese National Dialogue steering committee.
