= Bahri =

Bahri (Arabic: بحري) is a masculine Arabic given name.

== Given name ==
People with given name are include:

- Hüseyin Bahri Alptekin (1957–2007), Turkish artist
- Bahri Tanrıkulu (born 1980), Turkish taekwondo athlete
- Bahri Fazliu, Kosovo Albanian poet, publicist, and nationalist

== Surname ==
- Ahmed Al-Bahri (born 1980), Saudi Arabian footballer
- Hardev Bahri (1907–2000), Indian linguist
- Malik Hasan Bahri (died 1486), Bahmani noble and general
- Mamdouh Bahri (born 1957), Tunisian musician
- Nasser al-Bahri (1972–2015), Yemeni al-Qaeda member
- Ritu Bahri (born 1962), Indian judge
- Younis Bahri (1903–1979), Arab pro-Nazi radio broadcaster

== See also ==
- Bahri dynasty
- Bahri (company)
- Bahri (horse), thoroughbred racehorse
- Khartoum North
