= Sudan Change Now =

Political party in Sudan

- Founded: 2010
- Headquarters: Sudan
- Ideology: Democratic reform Non-violence

Website
- sudanchangenow.org

Sudan Change Now (Arabic: حركة التغيير الآن, romanized: Ḥarakat al-Taghyīr al-Ān, lit. 'Change Now Movement') is a Sudanese social and political movement aiming to achieve democratic, social, and economic, reform within Sudan. As stipulated in its charter, the focus of the group is on non-violent protest.

The Change Now Movement is a political and social change movement working to implement and achieve democratic transformation in Sudan in a peaceful manner, adopting a non-violent approach as stipulated in its charter as a step towards the desired progress of the Sudanese state. The movement works to overthrow the totalitarian regime that has ruled since its coup against the democratic system in Sudan in June 1989, at all its political, social, economic and cultural levels. It seeks to achieve the social, political, economic and cultural rights stipulated in its charter.

The Change Now Movement was founded by activists in late 2010 as a result of networking and gathering a number of resistance groups with the aim of calling for the overthrow of the regime. The first draft of the Change Now Charter was drawn up in May 2011. This was after months of resistance work and the conviction of the necessity of having a new body and working mechanisms in the Sudanese resistance milieu. It went through several stages, absorbing within it a greater number of activists and social and political actors.

The movement seeks to adopt issues that are directly related to people's lives and daily livelihoods, and has designed various campaigns to inform people of their social and political rights, and has also been active in anti-war campaigns (This War Is Not in Our Name campaign).

Your Right is Your Right Campaign, the campaign to reform health services in Sudan and oppose the sale of public facilities...etc. The movement also participated effectively in the events of June-July 2011.

She led the protest movement against the killing of Gezira University students after their arrest by security forces in November 2012.
