= Younis Bahri =

Iraqi traveler, journalist and author

- يونس بحري
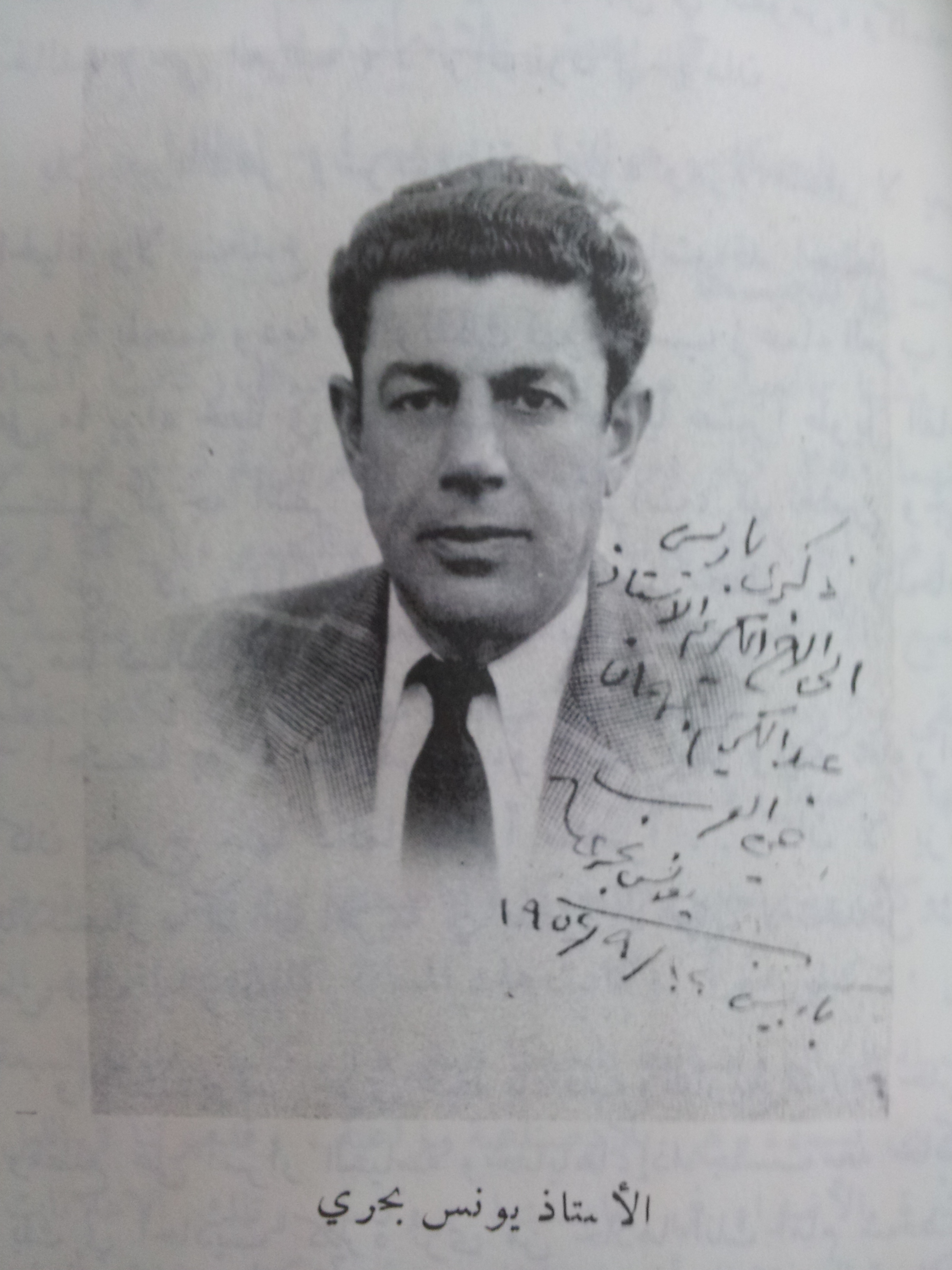
- Bahri in Paris, 1952
- Born: c. 1903 or January 1904; Mosul, Ottoman Empire (now Iraq)
- Died: 30 May 1979 (aged 76); Baghdad, Iraq
- Resting place: Al-Ghazali cemetery, Baghdad
- Occupations: Traveler; journalist; broadcaster; writer
- Years active: 1920s–1970s
- Notable work: This is Berlin, Long Live the Arabs

"Hunâ Berlin! Hayiya al-'Arab!" book cover in Arabic

Younis Saleh Bahri al-Juburi (c. 1903 – 30 May 1979; Arabic: يونس بحري) was an Iraqi traveler, journalist, broadcaster, and writer. He was born in 1903 or January 1904 in Mosul, Iraq, and was nicknamed "the sailor" for having graduated as a naval officer from a military school in Istanbul. In 1921, he continued his education in the Cavalry Military School in Munich, where he met Adolf Hitler. He is known for writing many books, and has traveled to several countries, and is said to have mastered over 17 languages, including English, French, German, Italian, Spanish, and Turkish. At the height of his career, Bahri founded multiple radio stations, including the first Arab radio station, Arab Radio of Berlin, on the European continent in 1939, broadcasting his famous catchphrase "This is Berlin, the neighborhood of Arabs" from Germany to the Arab world. On air, he would make speeches in which he would insult political leaders at the time. Bahri also met some of the most influential and famous people of his time, and was sentenced to death four times. The nature of his work and the multitude of professions he maintained made him a highly controversial figure. He took up numerous lines of work, most notably during his time in India, where he was a monk by day and a dancer by night. While there, he still managed to find time to work as a reporter for an Indian newspaper. He was also a Mufti in Indonesia, an editor-in-chief for a newspaper in Java, an Imam in Paris, and an advisor to king Idris of Libya, and was therefore known as "the Legend of the Earth".

== Birth and youth ==
Bahri was born in c. 1903 in Mosul, Iraq into a poor working-class family. His father, Saleh Agha Al-Juburi, was an officer in the Ottoman army, and worked within a unit in charge of delivering mail between Istanbul and Mosul. Bahri attended schools in Mosul, and in 1921, he joined a teaching academy in Baghdad, but he was expelled after three months, so he took a clerk position in the Ministry of Finance, which he left in 1923. He later traveled outside Iraq, reached Istanbul and decided to study marine science. However, the difficult economic situation in Turkey after World War I and the Independence War forced him to go back to Iraq.

== World travel ==
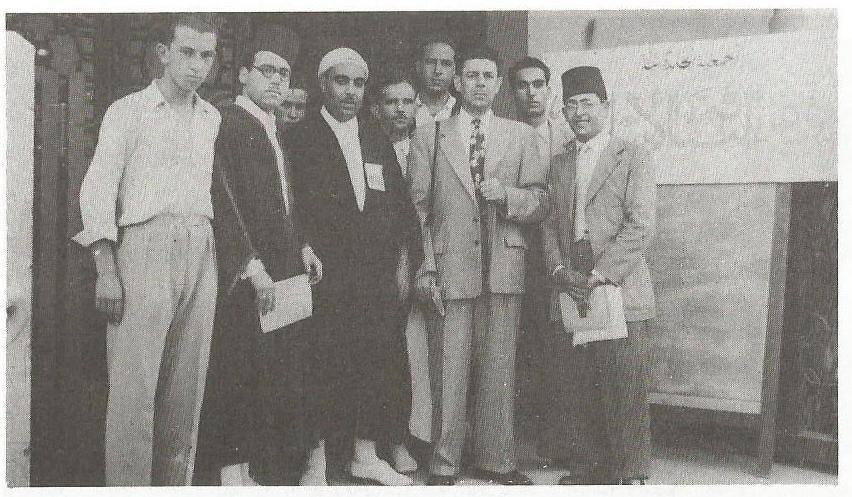
Younis Bahri, a participant in the Islamic Culture Conference in 1949, whose sessions were held at the Lycée Carnot (Lycée pilote Bourguiba) in Tunis

At the end of 1923, al-Juburi traveled around the world: he headed east through Iran, then to Afghanistan and India, reaching the Far East and Indonesia. He then passed through China and Japan, crossed the Pacific for the United States and Canada, then crossed the Atlantic and reached Europe. He went from Great Britain to Belgium, the Netherlands, France and Germany, then reached Egypt where he formed strong bonds with authors and intellectuals, and wrote in newspapers. He went back to Iraq in 1925 with the nickname "the Iraqi Traveler", and then left again for Kuwait, then Saudi Arabia. He crossed most of Saudi Arabia's desert alone and on foot, until he reached Yemen, where he met the Imam Yahi Bin Hamid El Din, the Chief of Yemen. He then crossed the Red Sea towards Africa, crossing Eritrea, Ethiopia and Sudan. He crossed the Sahara, visited Algeria again and met the Algerian intellectual Malek Bennabi in Constantine. Al-Juburi mentioned in his journals that he was deeply touched by Bennabi. 48 days later, he reached the Atlas mountains, and found himself in Morocco, so he visited the cities of Fes, Meknes, Marakech, Rabat and Tanja. He then crossed to Europe, reached Spain, then visited France, Germany and Belgium, sailing to Great Britain afterwards. He entered a competition to cross the Manche; he raised the Iraqi flag and signed up for the competition just a few hours before it began, without any preparation or training. He crossed the sea and won first place, the only Iraqi to do so. He was thus named "Yunis the Sailor" (Yunis Bahri, in Arabic) and given a diplomatic German passport. He went back to Iraq, where the media wrote about his adventures, and how he came back speaking several languages and showing vast knowledge. Throughout his travels, he gained 15 nationalities and worked in multiple jobs, until he gained the nickname "the Iraqi Tourist" among Arab journalists. He met kings and chiefs, and was honored in multiple countries that he visited. He went back to Iraq in 1933 and wrote about his adventures.

== Kuwait and the Iraqi ==
Younis left Iraq again in 1929 to meet the founder of the Kingdom of Saudi Arabia, King Abdul Aziz Al Saud, who was a big fan of him and his Kuwaiti friend Abdul Aziz Al Rachid. The King put them in charge of publishing the invitation to pilgrimage in the East Indies. The two of them left for southeast Asia and traveled towards the Far East. They reached the Indonesian islands and published together in 1931 a magazine under the name "Kuwait and the Iraqi" in the city of Java. Younis published another magazine "Al-Haq Wal Salam", got married in Indonesia and settled there for a short while before leaving again.

He faced several challenges with al-Rachid in Indonesia, as told by a Mosul newspaper on February 19, 1932: "The Iraqi tourist Younis Bahri reached Baghdad from Indonesia through Egypt, Palestine and Syria, where he stayed around seven months after he and his friend Al Rachid fought the ideas of colonizers. They also supported a truce between the two main parties in the country, the Alawites (conservatives) and the Irchadiines (rebels), noting that Indonesia had an organization to fight colonizers which is the "Irchad" organization, which is all Arab, as well as the "Islam and Mohamadia" organization, whose members are all natives." The magazine was continuously issued until the death of Abdul Aziz al-Rachid in Jakarta in 1938. He was buried in the Arab cemetery, noting that Younis had gone back to Iraq one year after the founding of the magazine.

== Radio Qasr al-Zuhur and the killing of King Ghazi ==
In 1933, he returned to Iraq and issued a newspaper called the Al-Aqab Newspaper, and in that period he worked as a broadcaster on Radio Qasr al-Zuhoor, which was founded by King Ghazi and was an Arabic radio station. He was the first to introduce King Ghazi to Radio Qasr al-Zuhur, and his voice was one which expressed opinions and ideas towards King Ghazi. Between 1935 and 1939, Bahri did not travel outside of Iraq much except for his visit to the 'Asir' Region in southern Saudi Arabia, and his attendance of a conference in Tunisia in 1937. He also participated in a swimming race, representing Iraq, and it is said that he participated in the race without training and still emerged victorious, taking first place and the golden medal. Bahri centered his publications in Al-Sahafa Square (Journalist’s Square) in Iraq when he issued the Al-Aqab newspaper. In April 1939, the day King Ghazi’s car collided with an electrical pole which led to his death, the Al-Aqab newspaper was published with its first page blacked out, and its title was in bold at the top of the page: "The Killing of King Ghazi". The published article caused demonstrations throughout Iraq. As a result, the demonstrators attacked the British consulate in Mosul, and when the British consul George Evelyn Arthur Cheyne Monck-Mason came out, he was killed by a number of the attackers. When police officers went to Bahri to arrest him and bring him to trial, he had already flown to Berlin on a Lufthansa flight, carrying a passport issued to him by the German embassy in Baghdad, as the German consul in Baghdad had helped him escape to Germany.

The reason for his arrest was attributed to the article published in his newspaper, reporting that there was hidden English influence behind the accident to get rid of the king, who was calling for the elimination of colonialism. It was King Ghazi who founded a radio in the Royal Palace of al-Zuhoor calling for national unity while issuing anti-English rhetoric, and Bahri was the first broadcaster on this radio.

== Berlin Arab Radio ==
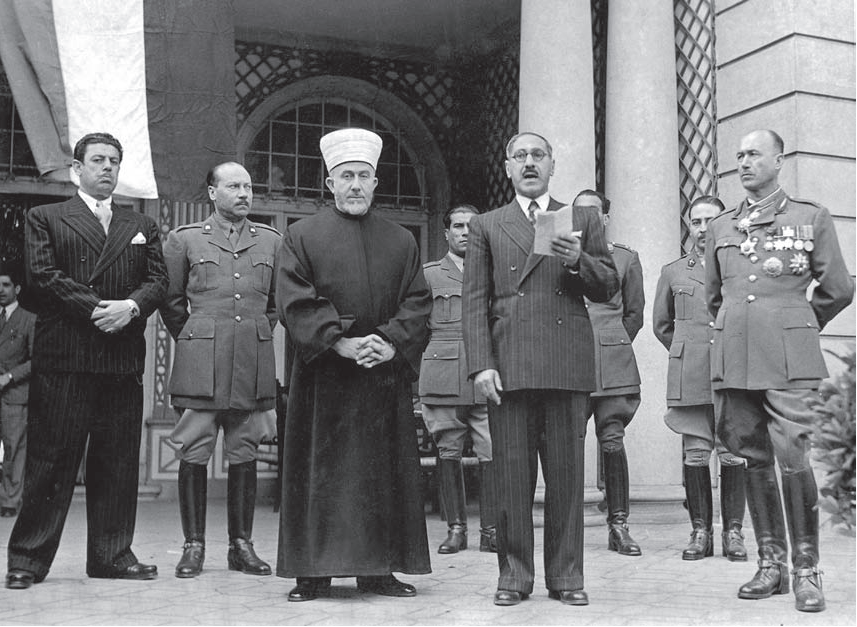
Younis Bahri, Amin al-Husseini, and Rashid Ali al-Gaylani speaking at the one year anniversary of the 1941 Iraqi Coup

Prior to the Second World War, he traveled to Berlin and met with the Nazi Propaganda Minister Joseph Goebbels and Dr. Alfred Rosenberg. Bahri reported on the Nazi Party's view, and did some anchor work that read comments and analyzed them on the Berlin Arab Radio Station (إذاعة برلين العربية) on the Kaiserdamm in Charlottenburg, with the Moroccan scholar Muhammad Taqi-ud-Din al-Hilali and the rebel Fawzi al-Qutb. In 1956 a book called ("Huna Berlin", meaning "Here Is Berlin") was printed in Beirut, which Bahri reported on and broadcast several parts. During his work on the radio, he was promoting Nazi propaganda and hostile rhetoric to Britain and its allies. He became one of the people close to the German leadership, attending official ceremonies in the Nazi German military uniform, wearing the swastika on his forearm, which allowed him to meet many of the Nazi elites, including the leader Adolf Hitler and the Italian fascist leader Benito Mussolini.

In order to attract Arab listeners to the Berlin Radio Station, Younis Bahri asked Goebbels to agree to broadcast verses from the Qur’an at the beginning of the radio broadcast. Goebbels hesitated but conveyed the proposal to Hitler, who agreed to it after Younis explained to him that broadcasting the verses of the Qur’an at the opening would attract the attention of Arab listeners to Berlin Radio, who would cease listening to the British Radio (BBC), which was not broadcasting the Qur’an. Radio Berlin gained the attention of some Muslim audiences, and became a favorite among the Arabs. After a while Britain realized this, so Radio BBC started broadcasting verses from the Qur’an also.

Despite the collapse of the Third Reich and the defeat of Germany, the Arab community was tuned in to the voice of Younis Bahri through the Arab radio station that he founded in Berlin. Bahri famously said in broadcast: "Here is Berlin, ‘Hay Al-Arab’(a greeting of welcome to Arabs)”. With this resounding phrase, Bahri founded his Arabic Radio from the German Radio Station in Berlin.

During his residence in Europe, he worked as an imam and preacher in a number of mosques of European countries. Professor Samir Abdullah Al-Sayegh commented on Younis Bahri’s work on German radios says: "We know that he worked on Berlin Radio and left it by a decision from Haj Amin Al-Husseini, even after he was the main factor in its success, and acquired the ears of Arab listeners everywhere. Al-Husseini decided to take him out because he did not adhere to the texts of the statements and comments that were prepared by the Arab Buro in Berlin as he was agitated and added harsh, unwritten phrases in the text that were primarily related to 'Abd al-Ilah, as well as Nuri al-Said and Abdullah I of Jordan".

== Post WWII ==
Younis worked in the Berlin Arab Radio Station that invited free Arab countries from English and French occupations. He had special bonds with Amin Al Husseini, Palestine's Mufti, and the Iraqi minister Rashid Ali al-Gaylani, who were allies of the Germans against the British. He attacked the British in his speeches on the radio, which the British responded to by saying that he was without principles. After the Nazi defeat in WWII, he went to France, then to Morocco, then Jordan. He came back to Baghdad, and traveled soon after to Lebanon in 1955, where he was well-known and loved. He stayed in Beirut for a while, where he was best friends with the famous journalist Gebran Toueini (owner of An-Nahr newspaper). He then left Beirut to visit Syria and Jordan, then Egypt at the request of the new Egyptian leadership after the revolution of 1956. President Gamal Abdel Nasser and Anwar Sadat celebrated him. When news of his visit to Egypt reached Iraq, the Hashemites in Iraq and Jordan feared that he would have a media role against the regimes in Iraq and Jordan. The two leaders asked for him, informing him that they would forgive him if he apologized to them, and that they would recruit him. He indeed came back to Iraq where he apologized and was forgiven for all the insults he uttered against them on his radio station. He was also recruited to work in a radio station preaching against the Egyptian media. Two days after his arrival in Baghdad, the July 14 revolution began. He was imprisoned because he was thought to be supporting colonization. He was arrested for seven months and sentenced to death, which later turned into a life sentence for insufficient evidence against him. He was then released in 1959, and worked as a cook in a restaurant in Baghdad. He aimed to gather politicians in his restaurant. He fled the country again as he still opposed the regime, and came back after the Ramadan Revolution. He then published a book about the revolution under the name "Agarid Rabih", and was called after by the president Abdul Salam Arif to be honored. About his time in and out of prison, he wrote: "I was once looking at a communist library, when an officer approached me and asked if I was Younis the Sailor. I answered 'Yes', and he pointed to a military vehicle. I got in, and we drove off to the Ministry of Defense. There, I was asked by the lead investigator who showed me a letter: ’Do you know whose handwriting this is?'. I said: 'This is my second son's handwriting, Saad'. He told me to sit down and showed me the letter. I read: 'Dear Military Leader, in the name of the national resistance, I oppose the release of my father Yunis the Sailor. This man was a British spy in Berlin, who then moved to Paris and became a spy to the French. My father is a double spy, a gambler and a sinner, and he deserves to be put in jail for life... or to die. Signed by Saad Yunis the Sailor."

He then traveled again and came back to Baghdad in the 1970s, where he got old and was forgotten.

== Bibliography ==
- This is Baghdad, printed in Baghdad in 1938.
- The Secrets of March 2, 1941 or the Iraqi English War, printed in Baghdad in 1968.
- The History of Sudan, printed in Baghdad in 1937.
- Tunisia, printed in Beirut in 1955.
- The Ramadan 14 Revolution, by Aghadir Rabih, printed in Beirut in 1963.
- The Islamic University, printed in Paris in 1948.
- Algeria, printed in Beirut in 1956.
- The War with Israel and its Allies, printed in Beirut in 1956.
- Blood in the Arabian Maghreb, printed in Beirut in 1955.
- Seven Months in the Prisons of Baghdad, printed in Beirut in 1960.
- The Voice of the Youth for Palestine and the Affected Arab Countries, printed in 1933.
- Iraq Today, printed in Beirut in 1936.
- Arabs in Africa, printed in Beirut.
- Arabs Abroad, printed in Beirut in 1964.
- Paris Nights, printed in Paris in 1965.
- Libya, printed in Beirut in 1956.
- The Mahdaoui Trial, printed in Beirut in 1961.
- Morocco, printed in Beirut in 1956.
- Islamic Mauritania, printed in Beirut in 1961.
- This is Berlin, Long Live the Arabs, هنا برلين حيَّ العرب, Beirut, 1956.
- Unity or Solidarity? Three Years Create New Destinies (Syria, Iraq, Yemen, Algiers, The United Arab Republic), printed in Beirut in 1963.

== Personal life ==
Yunis Bahri is said to have married more than 100 women and divorced often because of his many travels. He first married Madiha from Mosul, from whom he had 2 sons, Louai and Saadi, and one daughter, Mona, psychologist in the University of Baghdad. Louai has a PhD in Chemistry from the US, and Saadi became a famous lawyer and activist, and father of famous Iraqi artist Hani Hani and of Iraqi naval forces leader Raad Youhnis in the Philippines.

In 1929, he met Julie van der Veen, a Dutch painter, in a casino in the French city of Nice. He wanted to marry her, but she did not want to travel much and wanted to settle. He left to continue his travels, keeping in touch with Julie for more than 10 years through love letters written in German. He met Julie again in 1939, marrying her later that year in Berlin. Their marriage ended after less than four months and Julie returned to the Netherlands.

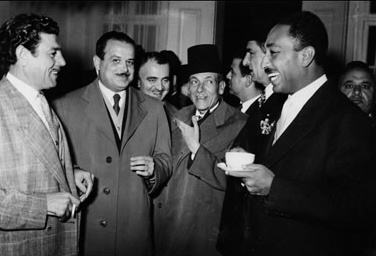
From right to left: Anwar Sadat, Secretary General of the Islamic World Conference and future President of Egypt; Lebanese parliamentarian Salah El-Bezri; Mohamed Ali Eltaher; Medhat Fatfat, Ambassador of Lebanon to Egypt; Farid Chéhab, Director of Lebanese General Security; Younis Bahri, Iraqi journalist and founder of the Arabic program at Radio Berlin during World War II – Beirut 1955

He had more than one hundred children, and this was mentioned by one of his companions in the Council attended by King Faisal I when the king congratulated him on the birth of his sixtieth son. The number of marriages exceeded anyone else's, and one of the journalists asked Bahri at the end of his life: "How did you marry so many women? You are a Muslim, and Islam does not allow more than four wives." Bahri said: "I divorced my wives after every marriage after a month, a year or more...".

== Death ==
He spent the end of his life in Baghdad, where he died in 1979, at the age of 76 in the home of his relative and colleague Nizar Mohammed Zaki (director of the office of the News Agency in Beirut). He was buried by the municipality in al-Ghazali cemetery.

The French Press Agency and Reuters reported the news of his death, published by the Lebanese daily An-Nahar on its front page.
