= Prisons in Sudan =

General supervision of the Sudan Prison Service is carried out by the director general of prisons, who is responsible for the country’s central prisons and reformatories. State authorities manage detention centers and jails in their administrative jurisdictions. As of the early 2000s, Sudan had four federal prisons, Kobar in Khartoum North, Shallah in Al-Fashir, Al-Junaynah in West Darfur, and Port Sudan on the Red Sea; 26 government prisons; and three open prisons. The total prison staff was estimated at 7,500, all of whom were attached to the police force. Correction officers underwent training at the police college and the police academy; prison wardens received little or no training. Additionally, there were four juvenile centers, and a female prison in Omdurman. As of 2011, prisons and other detention facilities were dilapidated and in need of expansion and replacement, no new major prisons having been built since the 1950s.

According to government officials, the estimated prison population was 14,000 as of 2011, but the country’s prison capacity was only 4,300. Crowding results from a judiciary that provides for no alternative to incarceration except flogging in some cases. Men and women are held in separate quarters, and political prisoners are segregated from criminal offenders. Prisoners are not registered; nor are they separated by age or according to the severity of offense. Consequently, minor offenders, including juveniles, are often housed with hardened criminals and might be subject to abuse. Access to legal aid is generally unavailable except for those individuals able to afford the legal fees; however, some nongovernmental organizations, a Bar Association committee, and the Ministry of Justice Legal Aid Department provide some legal assistance to prisoners.

According to UN and other sources, prison conditions are harsh, overcrowded, and lacking in health care, sanitary facilities, or even food for inmates apart from that provided by relatives. There are reports that abuse, such as beatings and deprivation of food, water, and other necessities, is routine. Some prisoners allegedly have died from lack of health care or from generally poor prison conditions. Women and vagrant children are detained, often for minor offenses; they are also subject to abuse within the penal system. The Child Law of 2004 represented an attempt by the state to adhere to international standards with regard to treatment of incarcerated children, but the extent of its implementation remained unclear as of 2011. In any case, few if any staff in prisons and correctional institutions are qualified to deal with juvenile offenders.
