= Saeed Madibo =

Sudanese politician (1928–2016)

Saeed Madibo (Arabic: سعيد ماديبو; 1928 – 4 August 2016) was the Nazir (paramount chief) of the Baggara Rizeigat of South Darfur. His family has held this position since the 1870s and were recognized as paramount chiefs by the British following the conquest of Darfur in 1916.

Since succeeding his brother as Nazir, Saeed has steadfastly followed a policy of neutrality in the Darfur conflict. He is head of tribal commission that governs Ed Daen, a region in Sudan.

Madibo died on 4 August 2016, at the age of 87–88
