= George Kongor Arop =

Sudanese politician (born 1951)

Second Vice President of Sudan
- In office 12 February 1994 – 14 October 2000
- President: Omar al-Bashir
- Preceded by: Joseph Lagu
- Succeeded by: Moses Kacoul Machar

Personal details
- Born: 1951 (age 74–75)
- Party: National Congress Party (until 2000)

Rtd. Gen. George Kongor Arop (born 1951) was the Second Vice President of Sudan from February 1994 to October 2000. He was a police officer, the governor of Bahr el Ghazal from 1992 to 1993, the president of the African National Congress and was granted an honorary doctorate from the University of Juba in political science. His period as Governor of Bahr el Ghazal saw the acceleration of efforts at Islamization of the region. He founded the African National Congress party (ANC), which opposed both the National Congress party under president Omar al-Bashir and later the Sudan Peoples' Liberation Movement under president Salva Kiir. After a political falling-out with president Kiir's camp, he left Juba politics and returned to his ancestral home of Konggor Arop Akol where he built a farm along the Amou River named Lara Village and became a major community Benefactor, establishing Ayak Girls and boys primary schools in Amokou, Jing hospital, Amokou police station, Acier-Cok primary school and Acier-cok police station while supporting orphans, widows and the wider community on his farm. He built boreholes across Konggor community most impoverished areas and trained community police to curb internal crimes. He is regarded as one of the community's most important figures.

Kongor Arop was appointed by President Omar al-Bashir as Second Vice President in February 1994 and was dismissed in October 2000 following his attempt to contest against President Omar al-Bashir in the 2006 Sudan general elections. He was a member of the ruling Islamist National Congress Party until dismissed. He planned to contest for the presidency of Sudan in 2006.

In 2017 he was appointed to the South Sudanese National Dialogue steering committee.

== Legacy ==
Following his services and responsive leadership in the Western Bahr el ghazal state, the indigenous people of Wau renamed a bridge connecting Jou market to lologo township Kupri Konggor( konggor bridge) and other areas such as Majak Konggor(Konggor estate) on the outskirts of Wau town near Agok Leper Colony or Agok Leprosy centre.

=== Local peacekeeping in Bahr-el-ghazal (1991-1994) ===
During his tenure as the governor of Bahr-el-ghazal, George Konggor addressed intercommunal violence and tribal tensions;

Women conference

He organised cross community women's conference to encourage dialogue and voice grievances

Grassroot mediations

He actively travelled to meet tribal chiefs and community leaders bringing conflicts parties to a single table

Youth engagement

He established weekly meetings to de-escalate tensions and unify localised youths factions

High-level national representation(1994-2000)

As the second vice president of Sudan under President Omar al-Bashir, George Konggor served as the head of the Southern desk, his primary responsibility was navigating the political governance of Southern Sudan amidst the devastating second sudanese civil war. while position put him at the centre of national governance, he was demised from the vice presidency in October 2000 three years before the outbreak of the armed rebellion in Darfur in 2003.

Later political advocacy (2005-present)

Following his exit from the ruling party, Konggor transitioned to institutional peace building.

African National Congress (ANC), in April, 3, 2006 he founded the ANC party, explicitly positioning it to protecting the comprehensive peace agreement (CPA)

National Dialogue Steering Committee. In 2017 he was appointed by President Salva Kiir to South Sudan's national dialogue steering committee to facilitate internal national reconciliation and unity.
