= Danny Garcia (activist) =

Danny Garcia is an American Christian peace activist, former military chaplain, and founder of Global Walk, who walked around the planet from 1996-2020. His efforts earned him the nickname "Walking Man."

In 1998, San Diego mayor Susan Golding named January 25, 1998 "Danny Garcia Day" in his honor.
