= Al-Haj Adam Youssef =

Sudanese politician (born 1955)

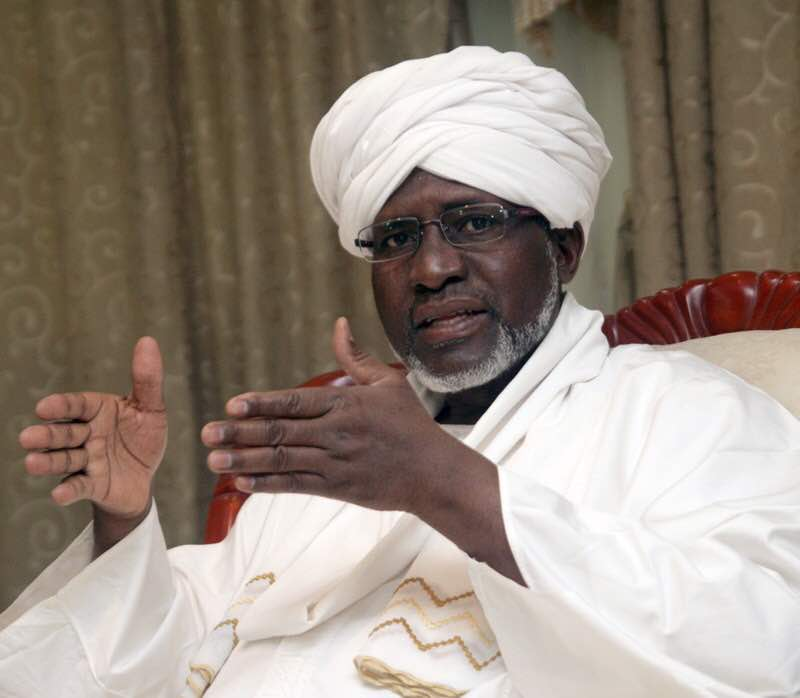

Second Vice President of Sudan
- In office September 13, 2011 – December 7, 2013
- President: Omar al-Bashir
- Preceded by: Ali Osman Taha
- Succeeded by: Hassabu Mohamed Abdalrahman

Personal details
- Born: 1955 (age 70–71) Id al-Firsasn, South Darfur, Sudan
- Party: National Congress Party
- Education: University of Khartoum, Newcastle University

Al-Haj Adam Youssef was the Second Vice President of Sudan from September 13, 2011 to December 7, 2013.

Political offices
Preceded by Ali Osman Taha	Second Vice President of Sudan; 2011–2013	Succeeded by Hassabu Mohamed Abdalrahman
