= 2011–2013 Sudanese protests =

Part of the Arab Spring

Sudanese protests (2011–2013)
- Part of the Arab Spring
- Sudan
- Date: 30 January 2011 – 26 October 2013 (2 years, 8 months, 3 weeks and 6 days); Small protests ongoing.
- Location: Sudan
- Caused by: Corruption; Unemployment; Austerity measures; Inspiration from concurrent regional protests
- Goals: Resignation of Omar al-Bashir; Removal of austerity plan; Democracy
- Methods: Demonstrations; Strike action; Riots; Sit-ins; Self-immolation; Online activism
- Result: President Omar al-Bashir announced he would not seek re-election in 2015 (announcement later withdrawn); Independence of South Sudan

Parties
| (Sudan) Various opposition groups: Sudanese Communist Party; Sudan Change Now | Government of Sudan: National Intelligence and Security Service; National Congress Party |

Lead figures
| Non-centralized leadership | Omar al-Bashir; President of Sudan |

Casualties
- Deaths: 200+
- Arrested: 2,000

The 2011–2013 protests in Sudan began in January 2011 as part of the Arab Spring regional protest movement. Unlike in other Arab countries, popular uprisings in Sudan had succeeded in toppling the government prior to the Arab Spring in 1964 and 1985. Demonstrations in Sudan however were less common throughout the summer of 2011, during which South Sudan seceded from Sudan, but resumed in force later that year and again in June 2012, shortly after the government passed its much criticized austerity plan.

== Background ==
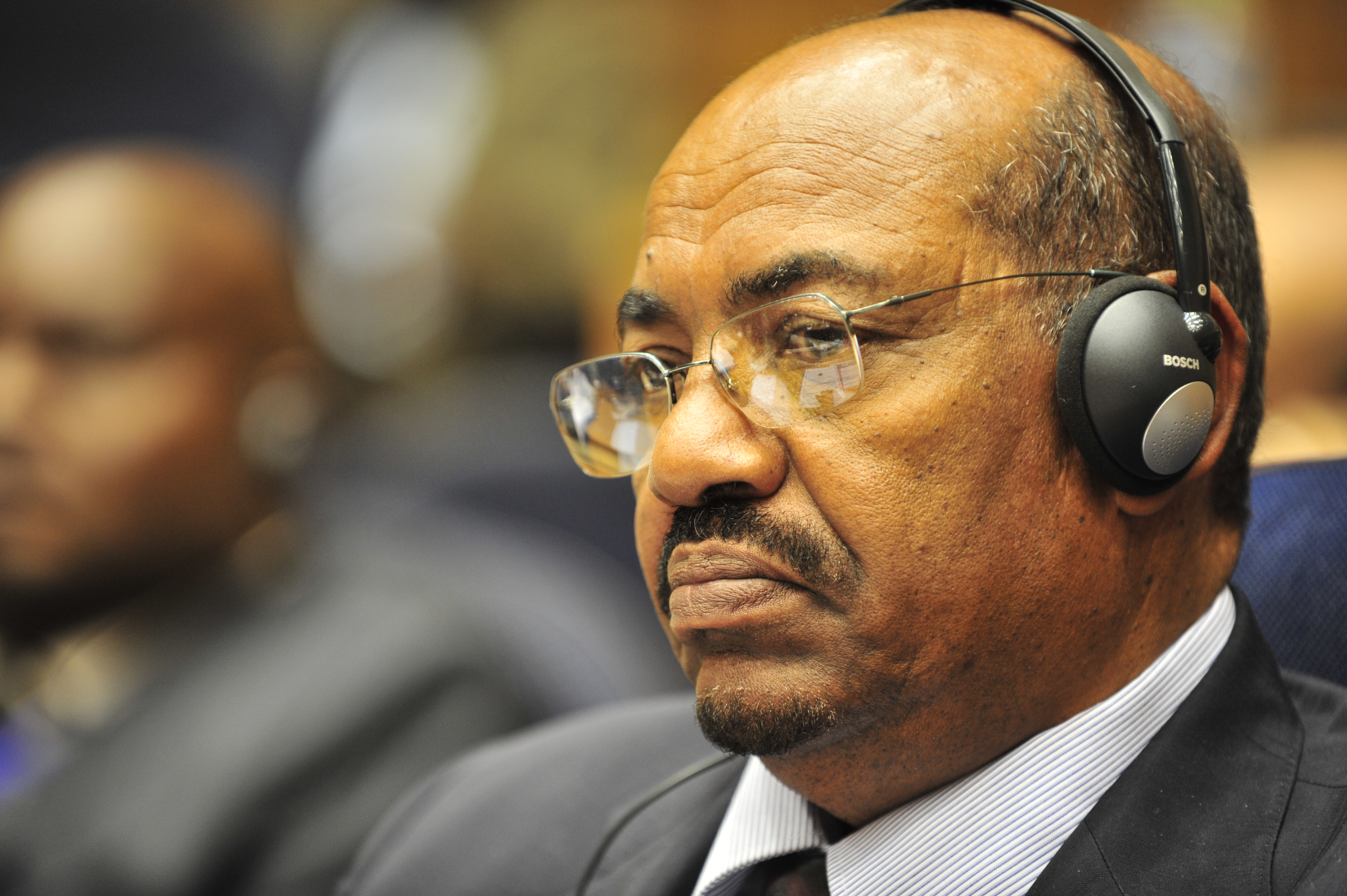
Omar al-Bashir had been in power since he led a bloodless coup in 1989.

President Omar al-Bashir had been the Sudanese president since he led a bloodless coup in 1989. Bashir began instituting Sharia and abolished political parties in 1990. He appointed himself president in 1993 and won a presidential election in 1996 as the only candidate. In 2008, the International Criminal Court called for his arrest for alleged genocide, crimes against humanity and war crimes in Darfur. Sudan rejected the indictment, saying the decision was an affront to Sudan's sovereignty. The political system of Sudan under his rule was widely regarded by both the domestic and the international community as a totalitarian system, due to the National Congress Party's control of all three branches of government and use of the National Intelligence and Security Service as a secret police force responsible for the repression of political opponents.

Sudan has lost billions of dollars in oil revenues since South Sudan gained independence in July 2011, about three-quarters of Sudan's oil fields falling within the territory of the new country. The north has been left struggling for revenue, plagued by inflation, and with a severe shortage of dollars to pay for imports. The landlocked South depended on the north's pipeline and port to export its crude, but Khartoum and Juba could not agree on how much South Sudan should pay to use the infrastructure. Sudan's already depleted oil revenues shrank by a further 20 per cent after its main Heglig oil field was damaged and shut down in fighting with invading South Sudanese troops in April 2012.

In an attempt to address the economic meltdown, the Sudanese government has announced a new austerity plan on 18 June 2012, which includes raising taxes on consumer goods, cutting the number of civil servants on its payroll, raising the price of a gallon of petrol by 5 Sudanese pounds, pushing it up to 13.5 pounds from 8.5 pounds, and lifting the fuel subsidies. The plan did not gain much acceptance among common Sudanese as it is believed that the prices of every commodity will get hikes in effect from transport to domestically produced food and other goods.

The protests in Sudan were influenced by the revolutionary wave that started in Tunisia and later spread to other Middle Eastern and North African nations. The protests followed shortly after a successful independence referendum in January 2011, on whether South Sudan should secede from Sudan and become an independent nation.

Following the self-immolation of Mohamed Bouazizi in Tunisia on 17 December 2010, Al-Amin Moussa Al-Amin set himself ablaze on 23 January 2011 in Omdurman.

== Protests ==
=== Start of protests ===
On 30 January 2011, protests took place in Khartoum and El Obeid. In Khartoum, police clashed with demonstrators in the town centre and at least two universities. Demonstrators had organized on online social networking sites since the Tunisian protests the month before. Hussein Khogali, editor in chief of the Al-Watan newspaper stated that his daughter had been arrested for organizing the protest via Facebook and opposition leader Mubarak al-Fadil's two sons were arrested while on their way to the main protest. Pro-government newspapers had warned that protests would cause chaos. Some protesters called for President Omar al-Bashir to step down. Activists said that dozens of people had been arrested. The protests came on the same day the preliminary results for the referendum indicated some 99% of South Sudanese voted to secede. One student died in hospital the same night from injuries received in the clashes. Students threw rocks at police officers while chanting "No to high prices, no to corruption" and "Tunisia, Egypt, Sudan together as one." Police officers arrested five and put down the protest.

In the El Obeid 30 January demonstration, about 500 people protested "against the government and demanding change" in the market. Police broke up the demonstration using tear gas.

On 1 February 2011, about 200 students demonstrated in front of Al-Neelain University in Khartoum. Police stopped the demonstration.

Further protests, scheduled for 21 March were violently suppressed as they were beginning.

On 1 November, hundreds of protesters took to the streets in the eastern town of Kassala.

=== Student protests in December 2011 ===
Students protested at the Red Sea University in Port Sudan after the arrest of several Darfuri student leaders on the night of 21 December, with many Darfuri student activists calling for a revolution and declaring their open support for the Sudan Revolutionary Front fighting the government in the south. On 26 December 42 Darfuri students left the Red Sea University in protest over their treatment, Radio Dabanga reported.

Students also clashed with riot police wielding batons after security forces stormed the University of Khartoum on 22 December to break up a rally by about 700 student demonstrators protesting the displacement of the Manasir community caused by the construction of the Merowe Dam. Twenty were injured and at least four were arrested, activists told media. On 24 December, approximately 16,000 students attempted to launch a sit-in at the university to protest the police, the university administration, and the federal government, but they were dispersed by riot police who deployed tear gas, dealt out beatings, and arrested at least 73. Leaders of the student movement warned that they would continue to organize and demand the overthrow of the government despite security officers' violent tactics. On 30 December, thousands of students successfully launched a sit-in protest, the Associated Press reported.

At Sudan University of Science and Technology in Khartoum, fighting between student supporters of Khalil Ibrahim and the ruling National Congress Party broke out on 28 December, days after the Sudanese government announced Ibrahim's death in a battle between his Darfuri rebel group JEM and the Sudan People's Armed Forces. Twelve were injured in the brawl, which police used tear gas to disperse.

The student protests, in particular those at the University of Khartoum, have been blamed by police on the influence of unnamed Sudanese opposition parties.

=== Anti-austerity protests in June–July 2012 ===
The former Sudanese independence flag has been used by some protestors as an opposition flag, along with the current flag

Hundreds of female students in the University of Khartoum protested peacefully in the surroundings of their hostels at the central campus on the evening of 16 June. The protesters voice opposition against the escalation of prices and economic hardship in Sudan. The next day, students took to the streets, denouncing the austerity measures one day ahead of plans announced by the Sudanese government.

As Omar Al-Bashir has formally announced a series of deep budget cuts while addressing the National Assembly in Khartoum, about 250 students held anti-austerity protest in the Khartoum University. Riot police used tear gas and batons against the protesters who in turn threw stones at police. The clashes took place in front of the main campus of the University of Khartoum and in the suburb Omdurman against more than 300 student protesters. On 20 June, hundreds of students held anti-austerity protest for another day, escalating their demands and started to chant slogans like "No, no to high prices" and "The people want to overthrow the regime".

Shortly after the Friday prayers on 22 June, hundreds of Sudanese assembled to protest. Unlike the previous protest held during the past few days, this protest was not mainly a student-led one due to the protest spreading into many neighborhoods that had been quiet. Protests took place in Omdurman, Khartoum, Burri, Al-Daim, El Obeid, Sennar, and Bahri after noon prayers. The police escalated the use of force during their clashes with the protesters and the smell of tear gas and broken rocks covered streets. Men in civilian clothes also attacked the demonstrators. Students in Kassala protested on 27 June outside the local university against the austerity measures and called for regime change.

On 29 June, around 2,000 protesters gathered in the capital and chanted anti-government slogans. Hundreds of police and security forces attacked the demonstration with tear gas. Other protests in the area of north Kordofan were reported. Activists said that a man named Amir Bayoumi, from Omdurman, has reportedly died from the effects of inhaling tear gas. The largest protest so far erupted in Sudan on 6 July in which between 3,000 and 4,000 people protested at Al Ansar mosque in Wad Nubawi, Omdurman. Security forces and police blocked the roads leading to the Al Ansar mosque and surrounded the courtyard before the end of Friday prayers.

Sudanese university students armed with sticks and stones on Wednesday staged one of their largest protest on 11 July since unrest sparked by inflation began nearly a month ago. Security forces fired tear gas while students at the University of Khartoum were shouting and throwing stones after the protest began mid-afternoon. Two days later, Sudanese police surrounded the Imam Abdel Rahman Mosque in Omdurman and fired teargas when some 300 worshippers started a protest after noon prayers. Officers used batons to drive worshippers back inside the mosque where they continued their protest for more than an hour. On 16 July, a group of over 300 Sudanese lawyers protested outside Khartoum's main courtroom on Monday against the government's use of violence and arbitrary detention during last Friday's peaceful demonstrations.

On 31 July, more than 1,000 protesters, mostly students, threw rocks at police, burned tires and blocked roads in the market area of Nyala, on Tuesday. Activists said police forces fired heavy teargas and live bullets, leading to the death of 12 protesters and injury of more than 50 and added that 9 of the victims' bodies have been received at Nyala Hospital. However, the authorities issued conflicting statements with the police, saying eight were killed and South Darfur governor saying only six protesters were killed. The weeks of protests later ended with a huge security crackdown, with almost more than 2,000 people arrested.

=== Sporadic protests ===
On 5 December 2012, four students at Gezira University, Darfur, were killed during a crackdown on anti-tuition fee protests. Demanding an investigation into the deaths, protests flared up once again, with students from Khartoum engaging in running battles with the police.

On 26 April 2013, protestors blocked a major road out of Khartoum in protest of a sell-off of farmland to Arabian investors. The crowds were dispersed by the authorities, wielding batons and tear gas. An alliance of four rebel groups called the Sudanese Revolutionary Front attacked the provincial town of Umm Ruwaba on 27 April. The government was eventually able to repel the attack, but ignited a local protest over lack of security in the region. Protestors stoned a government convoy the following day.

On the Bashir's 24th coup anniversary of 29 June, as many as 10,000 led by Sadiq al-Mahdi rallied in a square in Khartoum's twin city of Omdurman. Protesters held up signs saying: "The people demand the fall of the regime" and "Go Bashir". Hundreds of police officers were at the scene but they did not stop the rally.

More than 2,000 people took to the streets in Nyala on 18 September to demonstrate against the killing of a prominent businessman. They set several government buildings and cars on fire and burned tires, blocking roads and prompting police to fire teargas. Protesters shouted slogans before officers dispersed the crowd. Authorities later issued a nightly curfew in the, blaming the Darfuri rebels for trying to exploit the situation and enter the city.

=== Protests against fuel price in September–October 2013 ===
23 September 2013: Riots broke out after the government lifted its fuel and cooking gas subsidies to bring its budget under control. Within hours of petrol stations adjusting their price displays, some 800 protesters gathered in the center of Wad Medani, shouting "No, No to price hikes," while others called on Bashir to resign, yelling "Go, go." Three petrol stations and the branch of the French-Sudanese bank on the Soug El Kabir went up in flames, as also happened with a government administration unit at Soug El Malaja. The police reacted by shooting with rubber bullets and making heavy use of tear gas. Dozens of demonstrators were arrested. According to Sudan News Agency, police said a 23-year-old man was killed during a protest in Wad Madani but blamed unidentified gunmen opening fire from a passing vehicle that demonstrators had stoned. Activists however dismissed the government version and blamed government forces.

In Khartoum, the capital of Sudan, where there were protests in El Deim, Soug El Arabi and El Nilein University, the police used tear gas and sticks to disperse the crowd. A number of activists of the Sudanese Party and of Girifna were arrested in Khartoum North. An activist informed Radio Dabanga that "thunderous demonstrations" started from El Deim popular neighbourhood, led by women shouting "down with the regime". They were surrounded by the security men after Amarat Street was closed. A number of women were arrested. At the Nilein University in Khartoum students went out to demonstrate but were quickly cordoned by a huge police force. The demonstrators then tried to restart their protests at the Soug El Arabi, which was also surrounded by police.

Mohayed Siddig, a founding member of the youth movement "Sudan Change Now," was arrested following a raid on his home by six armed agents from the NISS. NISS agents searched his home for more than two hours, and also confiscated CDs, documents and Siddig's wife's laptop. By 2 October Siddig was still being held incommunicado and without charge, with Amnesty International claiming him to be at risk of torture and ill-treatment. Other members of "Sudan Change Now," including its spokesperson Amjed Farid, among others: Dahlia Elroubi, Omar Ushari and Khalid Omar, were also arrested.

24 September 2013: Widespread protests continued for the second day in a row, with hundreds of students and citizens took to the streets in Sudan's largest city, Omdurman, across the Nile from Khartoum. Protests were to be seen in Souk El Shaabi and in the districts of El Thawrat (the main streets Shingeeti and El Nuss, and the El Rumi neighbourhood) and Umbadda (El Sabil, El Gimiaab and El Rashidin), to protest against the rise of prices of basic commodities and public transport. At least four Khartoum state buses, two petrol stations at Shingeeti and Sabrin and the traffic police office of Omdurman were reportedly set on fire. Also three floors of the main office of the ruling National Congress Party in Umbadda burned out. The protests, calling for the "overthrow of the regime", led to the closure of schools, shops, Souk Omdurman, the Souk El Shaabi, and the suspension of public transport. Most of the protesters were ordinary citizens and students from secondary schools. They took control of the main streets and neighbourhoods of Omdurman, burning tires, and shouting slogans 'down with the regime'. He added that after that the police closed the streets and started arresting dozens of protesters.

In Khartoum, as listeners told Radio Dabanga, students of the University of Khartoum began to go out to demonstrate, despite the cordon of riot police cars around the university buildings. The main streets of the city witnessed violent clashes between demonstrators and the police and security men, which resulted in a number of injuries and deaths. The demonstrators set fire to a bus of Khartoum state and a number of petrol stations.

27 September 2013: Two non-government groups in Sudan, Amnesty International and the African Center for Justice and Peace Studies, claim that police killed more than 50 protesters, by aiming gunfire at people's heads and chests. Government officials, however, have said that there were fewer than 29 deaths.

Dr Sidgi Kaballo, a member of the Central Committee of Sudanese Communist Party, was arrested shortly after arriving in Sudan from the UK. Family members attempting to visit him on 30 September were turned away and told to return in 15 days. The NISS would not disclose the detained doctor's whereabouts to his family.

30 September 2013: 200 protesters marched in the Burri district of Khartoum for a third day in order to show support for the "martyr" Salah Sanhouri. Sanhouri, 28, was a pharmacist who had been shot dead days earlier on Friday 27 September during a protest. 300 people also demonstrated at the main bus station in Omdurman, although were dispersed by police with tear gas. Police also reportedly fired tear gas at an anti-government rally of between 150 and 200 students on the campus of Ahfad University for Women.

Dahlia Al Roubi and Rayan Zein Abideen, members of "Sudan Change Now," were taken to the NISS building in Emarat area where they were held without charge, access to lawyers or their families. By 2 October Amnesty International claimed to have received information that they had been moved to an unknown location

1 October 2013: Amnesty International claimed that in a new wave of arrests, security forces arrested at least 800 activists members of opposition parties, journalists, and others, in raids that took place on the night of Monday 30 September and the early hours of the morning on Tuesday 1 October.

At a government press conference, the Sudanese Government responded to claims of photographic and video evidence of the crackdown against protesters by claiming that most of the photos were actually taken in Egypt, which has also been experiencing unrest. Bahram Abdelmoneim, a journalist with the Al Youm Al Taly newspaper, accused the government officials of lying when getting up to ask a question, and claimed that the deaths were caused by National Congress militias. Abdelmoneim was later unreachable after going to meet with government security agents.

2 October 2013: The Ministry of the Interior announced that the government had arrested 700 "criminals" in Khartoum and elsewhere since the beginning of the new wave of protests on 23 September, however reports from journalists, opposition groups, and others maintain that a far greater number have been arrested. Arrests are often carried out under Sudan's 2010 National Security Act, which granted the National Intelligence and Security Service powers to detain suspects for up to four and a half months without any form of judicial review.

Amnesty International also claimed that at least 17 members of the Sudanese Communist Party had been in and around Khartoum since the beginning of protests, alongside members of other parties, including 15 from the Sudanese Congress Party.

The Sudanese Doctor's Union also claimed that at least 210 protesters had been killed in Khartoum alone by 2 October, with most dying from gunshot wounds to the head and chest.

4 October 2013: In a press statement, Interior Minister Ibrahim Mahmoud Hami blamed the deaths of protesters on "armed groups and individuals." By 5 October, the Sudanese government had still not claimed responsibility for any of the deaths, which the government claimed to number only 34.

Several hundred protesters gathered in Khartoum on Friday 4 October calling for the resignation of Omar al-Bashir, although the protests were far smaller than those in the week before.

9 October 2013: In a live speech on national radio, President Omar al-Bashir claimed that the protests were part of an attempt to overthrow the government. Bashir however claimed that the government could not be overthrown as it was "guarded by God." Bashir also stated that the government was planning a major economic conference for November in order to gather experts in order to find solutions to help stabilize the economy.

Bashir had previously claimed that demonstrators were linked to anti-government conspiracies, and Interior Minister Ibrahim Mahmoud Hamed had claimed that demonstrators were backed by foreign groups.

By 9 October the Sudanese government had also upgraded its estimate for the number of deaths from the protests, giving a figure of 60–70. The Sudanese government also claimed that security forces had been forced to intervene when crowds turned violent and began attacking petrol stations and police.

10 October 2013: Four children and four adults were convicted of vandalism during the protests.

11 October 2013: Following Friday prayers, around 150 Sudanese pro-democracy activists and Islamists protested outside Khartoum's Grand Mosque. Demonstrators held banners reading "our revolution is peaceful". Security forces surrounded the area but stayed away from the protesters.

21 October 2013: In an interview released on 21 October, President Omar al-Bashir claimed in an interview with Saudi newspaper Okaz that the unrest was mainly the work of rebel groups in Darfur, South Kordofan and Blue Nile states. Bashir claimed that the groups had waited for the lifting of subsidies, which had provided them an opportunity to attempt to overthrow the government. Bashir claimed that even Sudanese citizens were surprised by the scale of the unrest.

24 October 2013:

26 October 2013: Speaking to the AFP, Fadlallah Ahmed Abdallah, an MP with the National Congress Party, announced plans to secede from the NCP and form a new party following the government response to the protests. Abdallah claimed that the name and structure of the new party would be announced within a week.

== Arrests and repression ==
On 17 January 2011, security forces in Sudan arrested the head of the Popular Congress Party, Hassan al-Turabi, as well as five other members of the party, after he called for a similar protest to oust the ruling government over electoral fraud, stoking inflation and abrogating civil liberties at a time when Sudan was facing a secessionist referendum.

The Committee to Protect Journalists said journalists are facing increasing harassment. On 30 January 2011, journalists were beaten by security forces and at least eight were detained. The following day, the distribution of several opposition newspapers was blocked by authorities.

During the anti-austerity protests in June 2012, the Egyptian journalist Salma El-Wardany was detained on 21 June 2012 and later released after five hours in detention. A Sudanese citizen journalist Usamah Mohamad was arrested the following day. An Agence France-Presse reporter was also detained.

As of July 2012, over 2,000 activists have been detained since protests began in Khartoum on 16 June, the activist group Girifna reported. The majority of detainees are being held in NSS detention centres, which are known for the use of ill treatment and torture—including beatings, sleep and food deprivation, racism and sexual abuse. Authorities have reportedly beaten detainees with their fists, hoses, plastic pipes, sticks and metal bars.

== Responses ==
=== Domestic ===
On 21 February 2011, President Omar al-Bashir announced that he would not seek to run in the presidential election in 2015.

On 11 July 2012, President Omar al-Bashir dismissed opposition calls for an Arab Spring-style uprising in the African country, threatening that "a burning hot summer" awaits his enemies. Bashir also warned that Sudan's enemies would also be skewered.

=== International ===
USA – The U.S. State Department spokeswoman Victoria Nuland condemned the assault and detention of anti-austerity protestors, saying a crackdown on protestors will not solve Sudan's political and economic crises. "There have been reports of protestors being beaten, imprisoned and severely mistreated while in government custody. We call for the immediate release of those detained for peaceful protest."

The Arabic Network for Human Rights Information slammed the crackdown on protests, says Khartoum "must show respect for the human rights" of its citizens after Khartoum uses violence to disperse peaceful demonstrations: "There should be dialogue with the opposition and respect for the human rights of its citizens to express themselves and protest without harassment."

The Organisation for Defence of Rights and Freedoms said that police in Sudan have attacked demonstrators with tear gas and rubber bullets and accused security forces of surrounding mosques where protests take place.

Human Rights Watch stated that the Sudanese security forces have arrested scores of protesters, opposition members, and journalists, beat people in detention, and used rubber bullets and even live ammunition to break up the anti-austerity protests. It further called on Sudan to end the crackdown on peaceful protesters, release people who have been detained, and allow journalists to report freely on the events.

The United Nations High Commissioner for Human Rights urged the Sudanese authorities to ensure that the demonstration proceeds peacefully, without mass arrests and violent measures by security forces.

On 30 June 2012, Sudanese living outside Sudan stage protests in London, Dublin, Washington, D.C., Toronto, Paris, Cairo, New Delhi, Kuala Lumpur, Edinburgh, Sacramento, Canberra and other various locations to show solidarity with the ongoing anti-government protests in Sudan.

== See also ==
- 1989 Sudanese coup d'état
- Sudanese conflict in South Kordofan and Blue Nile
- Sudanese nomadic conflicts
- War in Darfur
- 2016 Sudanese protests
- 2018–2019 Sudanese protests
