= Bakri Hassan Saleh =

Vice President of Sudan (2013–2019)

- بكري حسن صالح

11th Prime Minister of Sudan
- In office 2 March 2017 – 9 September 2018
- President: Omar al-Bashir
- Preceded by: Sadiq al-Mahdi (1989)
- Succeeded by: Motazz Moussa

First Vice President of Sudan
- In office 8 December 2013 – 23 February 2019
- President: Omar al-Bashir
- Preceded by: Ali Osman Taha
- Succeeded by: Ahmed Awad Ibn Auf

Minister of National Defence
- In office 11 July 2000 – 21 September 2005
- President: Omar al-Bashir
- Preceded by: Abdel Rahman
- Succeeded by: Abdel Rahim Mohammed Hussein

Personal details
- Born: 1949 (age 76–77) Dongola, Anglo-Egyptian Sudan (now Sudan)
- Party: National Congress Party

Military service
- Allegiance: Sudan
- Rank: Lieutenant General

Bakri Hassan Saleh (Arabic: بكري حسن صالح; born 1949) is a Sudanese politician who served as Prime Minister of Sudan from March 2017 until September 2018 (the first in almost 28 years) and as First Vice President of Sudan from December 2013 until February 2019, when he was dismissed.

== Life and career ==
Saleh was born in the village of Hafir Meshou, north of Dongola. He attended Al-Hafir primary school, and later moved to Al-Barqeeq Central School to receive his Mediterranean education. He studied at Dongola secondary school from 1964 to 1968. He graduated from the Sudanese Military Academy with the rank of Lieutenant in 1973. He served as the commander of the Special Forces from 1985 to 1987 and again from 1988 to 1989.

As an army officer, Saleh took part in the June 1989 military coup that brought Omar al-Bashir to power, and he served as a member on the Revolutionary Command Council for National Salvation, which governed Sudan following the coup. Saleh held prominent positions in the Sudanese security agencies. He was Director of the National Security Service from 1990 to 1995, Minister of the Interior from 1995 to 1998, Minister of Presidential Affairs from 1998 to 2000, Minister of Defense from 2000 to 2005, and Minister of Presidential Affairs again from 2005 to 2013.

In 2012 he was appointed as Deputy Secretary-General of the Islamic Movement.

Saleh was appointed to the position of First Vice President on 8 December 2013 as part of a shakeup in the leadership following the 2013 protests. Saleh has been rumoured as a possible successor to Omar al-Bashir.

On 1 March 2017, he was appointed by President Omar al-Bashir as Sudan's first Prime Minister since the post was abolished in 1989. The post of Prime Minister was re-established with limited powers, while most power remained in the hands of the President. As Prime Minister, Saleh retained his post as First Vice President. He was sworn in as Prime Minister on 2 March. Two months later, on 11 May, Saleh announced the composition of the new government, which had 31 ministers and 44 secretaries of state.

After Bashir was overthrown in 2019, Saleh was imprisoned and tried over his role in the 1989 coup. However, this was halted following the outbreak of the Sudanese civil war (2023–present). In 2024, he was transferred from Wadi Seidna Air Base to Merowe, where he was hospitalised due to poor health. He was ordered released on the same grounds by Sudanese authorities in April 2025.

Political offices
Vacant Title last held by Sadiq al-Mahdi	Prime Minister of Sudan; 2017–2018	Succeeded by Motazz Moussa
