= Hassabu Mohamed Abdalrahman =

Sudanese politician

Second Vice President of Sudan
- In office 7 December 2013 – 10 September 2018
- President: Omar al-Bashir
- Preceded by: Al-Haj Adam Youssef
- Succeeded by: Osman Mohamed Yousif Kibir

Personal details
- Party: National Congress Party (Sudan)

Hassabu Mohamed Abdalrahman (also known as Hassabu Mohamed Abdul-Rahman) served as the Second Vice President of Sudan from 7 December 2013 to 10 September 2018. In the wake of the Sudanese revolution in 2019 Abdalrahman was imprisoned, together with his successor, Osman Kebir. He was arrested again in February 2021 in Darfur.

Abdalrahman is from South Darfur. He was previously the chief of Sudan's Humanitarian Aid Commission.
