= Ali Osman Taha =

Sudanese politician (born 1944)

Ali Osman Mohammed Taha
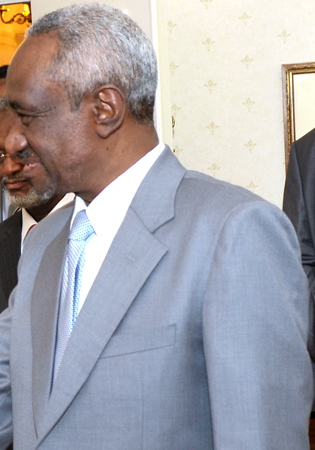
- Taha in 2010

First Vice President of Sudan
- In office July 9, 2011 – December 6, 2013
- President: Omar al-Bashir
- Preceded by: Salva Kiir
- Succeeded by: Bakri Hassan Saleh
- In office August 1995 – January 2005
- President: Omar al-Bashir
- Preceded by: Zubair Mohamed Salih
- Succeeded by: John Garang

Second Vice President of Sudan
- In office January 9, 2005 – July 9, 2011
- President: Omar al-Bashir
- Preceded by: Moses Kacoul Machar
- Succeeded by: Al-Haj Adam Youssef

Foreign Minister of Sudan
- In office 1995–1998
- Preceded by: Hussein Suleiman Abu Saleh
- Succeeded by: Mustafa Osman Ismail

Personal details
- Born: January 1, 1944 (age 82)
- Party: National Congress

Ali Osman Mohammed Taha (Arabic: علي عثمان محمد طه, also transliterated "Othman" or "Uthman"; born 1 January 1944) is a Sudanese politician who was first vice president of Sudan from July 2011 to December 2013. Previously he was minister of foreign affairs from 1993 to 1995, first vice president from 1995 to January 2005, and second vice president from August 2005 to July 2011. He is a member of the National Congress Party.

He was considered an Islamist hardliner in the former regime of Omar al-Bashir.

Taha is a graduate of the Faculty of Law at the University of Khartoum. He then set up a private law practice before being appointed as a judge and then entering politics as a member of Sudan's parliament in the 1980s.

Taha, along with John Garang, is credited as being the co-architect of Sudan's Comprehensive Peace Agreement which brought Africa's longest civil war to an end on 9 January 2005. The agreement capped an eight-year process to stop the civil war, which since 1983 had taken 2 million lives. Starting in December 2003 Taha and Garang met numerous times to finalize the peace agreement.

Taha heads the Sudanese side of the Sudanese-Egyptian High Committee, which was headed on the Egyptian side by Prime Minister Ahmed Nazif and includes Ministers from both countries and aims to foster cooperation between the two countries.

al-Bashir reappointed Taha as Second Vice President in May 2010 in spite of speculations that he would be replaced by a more hard-line NCP member or a Darfurian. Taha was viewed as a moderate figure in the NCP regime and a possible successor to Bashir, although some have suggested that Bashir might have preferred that his successor be a hard-liner.

Taha was arrested on April 11, 2019 following the 2019 Sudanese coup d'état.

On May 27, 2020, Sudan’s public prosecution service announced that Taha had tested positive for COVID-19 and was subsequently placed in quarantine.

On April 26, 2023, Taha reportedly escaped from Kobar Prison amid the breakout of the civil war.

== Involvement in the Darfur Crisis ==
Taha was responsible for handling the Darfur crisis from 2003 to 2004. Community leaders in Darfur have reported that Taha holds personal ties with Musa Hilal and was instrumental in releasing Hilal from prison in 2003. Taha apparently assigned Hilal the authority to recruit and command a militia group, which became known as "Quick, Light and Horrible Forces of Misteriha." Government help for Hilal was reported to be very open and was coordinated through Taha. Taha was quoted as saying to commanders of the Janjaweed militia, "I don't want one single village of Zurgas in Darfur. All the Zurga lands are yours." After an attack by the Janjaweed militia and the Armed Forces in the town of Kyla, a survivor from the Fur tribe reported that the attackers sang, "Hail the name of Allah, our orders came from Ali Usman Taha."

In 2005 Taha opposed holding trials outside Sudan after 51 individuals were accused, by a United Nations commission of inquiry, of war crimes and crimes against humanity. Taha argued that doing so would "push things to degenerate rather than help people to reconcile or maintain peace." In 2008, Taha also opposed the ICC indictment of President Omar al-Bashir by arguing that, "We can't go along with implementing the CPA or other agreements with a president that is subject to international trial." In the same year, the Associated Press quoted reliable sources saying Taha would be charged with crimes similar to those that President Omar al-Bashir had been charged with. In February 2009, Taha reportedly traveled to Turkey seeking the nation's support to save Sudan's president, al-Bashir, from trial.

Taha is mentioned several times in the application of arrest for President Omar al-Bashir, submitted by Luis Moreno Ocampo, prosecutor of the ICC. For example, Commissioner Rabeh told Janjaweed militia commanders that the General Commander in Khartoum and Taha ordered the provision of armament for the elimination of zurgas. Zurga is a derogatory term for people from African tribes.
